= 1934 in Australian literature =

This article presents a list of the historical events and publications of Australian literature during 1934.

== Books ==
- Martin Boyd – Scandal of Spring
- Eleanor Dark – Prelude to Christopher
- Velia Ercole – Dark Windows
- Arthur Gask
  - The Hidden Door
  - The Judgement of Larose
- G. B. Lancaster – The World is Yours
- Vance Palmer – The Swayne Family
- Alice Grant Rosman – Somebody Must
- Steele Rudd – Grey Green Homestead
- Christina Stead – Seven Poor Men of Sydney
- F. J. Thwaites
  - Broken Wings
  - Where Gods Are Vain
- E. V. Timms – Conflict

== Short stories ==
- Ion Idriess – The Yellow Joss
- Vance Palmer – Sea and Spinifex
- Henry Handel Richardson – The End of Childhood and Other Stories
- Christina Stead – The Salzburg Tales

== Children's ==
- Ruth Bedford – Hundreds and Thousands
- P. L. Travers – Mary Poppins
- Alan J. Villiers – Whalers of the Midnight Sun
- Dorothy Wall
  - Blinky Bill Grows Up
  - The Tale of Bridget and the Bees

== Poetry ==
- Emily Coungeau – Fern Leaves: Poems and Verse
- Rudyard Kipling – "Ode : Melbourne Shrine of Remembrance, 1934"
- Will Lawson – "The Bunyip"
- Furnley Maurice – Melbourne Odes
- John Shaw Neilson – Collected Poems of John Shaw Neilson (edited by R. H. Croll)
- Patrick White – "The Ploughman"

== Drama ==
- Varney Monk – The Cedar Tree

== Awards and honours ==
=== Literary ===
Award	Author	Title	Publisher
ALS Gold Medal	Eleanor Dark	Prelude to Christopher	P.R. Stephensen

== Births ==
A list, ordered by date of birth (and, if the date is either unspecified or repeated, ordered alphabetically by surname) of births in 1934 of Australian literary figures, authors of written works or literature-related individuals follows, including year of death.

- 17 February – Barry Humphries, comedian, author, actor and satirist (died 2023)
- 20 March – David Malouf, novelist and poet (died 2026)
- 6 May – Chris Wallace-Crabbe, poet (died 2025)
- 20 June – Margaret Scott, poet and novelist (born in Bristol, England)(died 2005)
- 30 June – Rod Milgate, playwright and painter (died 2014)
- 5 August – James McQueen, novelist (died 1998)
- 17 August – Inga Clendinnen, academic and author (died 2016)

== Deaths ==
A list, ordered by date of death (and, if the date is either unspecified or repeated, ordered alphabetically by surname) of deaths in 1934 of Australian literary figures, authors of written works or literature-related individuals follows, including year of birth.

- 22 December – Grace Ethel Martyr, poet (born 1888)

== See also ==
- 1934 in Australia
- 1934 in literature
- 1934 in poetry
- List of years in Australian literature
- List of years in literature
