= 1941 in Australian literature =

This article presents a list of the historical events and publications of Australian literature during 1941.

== Books ==
- Eleanor Dark – The Timeless Land
- Arthur Gask – The Beachy Head Murder
- Ernestine Hill – My Love Must Wait : The Story of Matthew Flinders
- Michael Innes – Appleby on Ararat
- Jack Lindsay
  - Hannibal Takes a Hand
  - The Stormy Violence
- Jack McLaren – Their Isle of Desire
- Katharine Susannah Prichard – Moon of Desire
- Kylie Tennant – The Battlers
- F. J. Thwaites
  - Shadows Over Rangoon
  - Wind in the Bracken
- Patrick White – The Living and the Dead

== Children's ==
- Mary Durack and Elizabeth Durack – The Way of the Whirlwind
- May Gibbs – Scotty in Gumnut Land
- P. L. Travers – I Go By Sea, I Go By Land

== Short stories ==
- Marjorie Barnard – "Dry Spell"
- Xavier Herbert – "Kaijek the Songman"
- Lennie Lower – The Bachelors' Guide to the Care of the Young and Other Stories
- Vance Palmer – "Josie"

== Poetry ==
- Kathleen Dalziel – Known and Not Held : Verses
- James Devaney – "Bamba"
- Mary Gilmore – The Disinherited
- Lesbia Harford – The Poems of Lesbia Harford
- Furnley Maurice – "Apples in the Moon"
- David McNicoll – "Air Mail—Palestine"
- Ian Mudie – This is Australia
- John Shaw Neilson – "Say This For Love"
- Bernard O'Dowd – The Poems of Bernard O'Dowd
- Douglas Stewart – Sonnets to the Unknown Soldier

== Drama ==
- Douglas Stewart – The Fire on the Snow

== Awards and honours ==
=== Literary ===
Award	Author	Title	Publisher
ALS Gold Medal	Patrick White	Happy Valley	Harrap

== Births ==
A list, ordered by date of birth (and, if the date is either unspecified or repeated, ordered alphabetically by surname) of births in 1941 of Australian literary figures, authors of written works or literature-related individuals follows, including year of death.

- 7 February – Beverley Farmer, novelist and short story writer (died 2018)
- 23 March – Bruce Bennett, literary academic (died 2012)
- 31 May – Julian Croft, poet
- 23 June
  - Margaret Hamilton, children's literature publisher and author (died 2022)
  - Roger McDonald, novelist
- 11 August – Rae Desmond Jones, poet, novelist, short story writer and politician (died 2017)
- 15 August – Hilary McPhee, publisher and editor (died 2026)
- 22 September – Murray Bail, novelist
- 28 November – Jennifer Rankin, poet and playwright (died 1979)
- 15 December – Richard Neville, author and editor (died 2016)
- 21 December – Mungo MacCallum, political journalist and commentator (died 2020)

Unknown date

- Elaine Forrestal, novelist
- Barry Maitland, novelist (b. in Scotland)

== Deaths ==
A list, ordered by date of death (and, if the date is either unspecified or repeated, ordered alphabetically by surname) of deaths in 1941 of Australian literary figures, authors of written works or literature-related individuals follows, including year of birth.

- 3 February – Thomas Welsby, businessman, politician and historian (born 1858)
- 5 February – A. B. Paterson, author and poet (born 1864)
- 27 April – Winifred Lewellin James, author (born 1876)
- 13 June — Alice Guerin Crist, poet, author and journalist (born 1876)
- 7 July – Randolph Bedford, poet and novelist (born 1868)
- 17 October – Alfred Thomas Chandler, journalist, editor and newspaper proprietor (born 1852)
- 13 November — Enid Derham, poet and academic (born 1882)

== See also ==
- 1941 in Australia
- 1941 in literature
- 1941 in poetry
- List of years in Australian literature
- List of years in literature
