= 1936 in Australian literature =

This article presents a list of the historical events and publications of Australian literature during 1936.

== Books ==
- Dymphna Cusack – Jungfrau
- Eleanor Dark – Return to Coolami
- Jean Devanny – Sugar Heaven
- M. Barnard Eldershaw – The Glasshouse
- Miles Franklin – All That Swagger
- Arthur Gask
  - The Hangman's Knot
  - The Master Spy
- William Hatfield – Big Timber
- Henry George Lamond – Amathea: The Story of a Horse
- Will Lawson – When Cobb and Co. was King
- Jack Lindsay – The Triumphant Beast
- Jack McLaren – The Crystal Skull
- A. B. Paterson — The Shearer's Colt
- Brian Penton – Inheritors
- Alice Grant Rosman – Mother of the Bride
- Christina Stead – The Beauties and Furies
- F. J. Thwaites
  - The Defender
  - The Redemption
- E. V. Timms – Uncivilised (attributed to Charles Chauvel, but written by Timms)
- Arthur Upfield – Wings Above the Diamantina

== Short stories ==
- Jack Lindsay – Come Home at Last
- Dal Stivens – The Tramp, and Other Stories

== Children's ==
- Martin Boyd – The Painted Princess
- Mary Grant Bruce – Circus Ring
- Dorothy Cottrell – Wilderness Orphan
- Mary Durack & Elizabeth Durack – Chunuma
- Norman Lindsay – The Flyaway Highway

== Poetry ==
- Rex Ingamells – "Garrakeen"
- Will Lawson – "Old River Days"
- Douglas Stewart – Green Lions: Poems

== Drama ==
- E. V. Timms – The Shadow Man

== Biography ==
- Ion Idriess – The Cattle King

== Awards and honours ==
=== Literary ===
Award	Author	Title	Publisher
ALS Gold Medal	Eleanor Dark	Return to Coolami	Collins

== Births ==
A list, ordered by date of birth (and, if the date is either unspecified or repeated, ordered alphabetically by surname) of births in 1936 of Australian literary figures, authors of written works or literature-related individuals follows, including year of death.

- 15 January – Kate Llewellyn, poet
- 1 February – Marian Eldridge, short story writer, poet and book reviewer (died 1997)
- 13 February – Judith Rodriguez, poet (died 2018)
- 28 February – Robin Klein, writer for children
- 13 October – Robert Ingpen, artist and writer for children
- 27 December –
  - Brian Matthews, biographer and academic (died 2022)
  - Alex Miller, novelist (born in London, England)

Unknown date:

- Mal Morgan, poet (died 1999)

== Deaths ==
A list, ordered by date of death (and, if the date is either unspecified or repeated, ordered alphabetically by surname) of deaths in 1936 of Australian literary figures, authors of written works or literature-related individuals follows, including year of birth.

- 4 March – Arthur H. Adams, poet and editor (born 1872)
- 23 March – Oscar Asche, playwright and novelist (born 1871)
- 26 July – Emily Coungeau, poet (born 1860)
- 20 August – Agnes L. Storrie, poet and writer (born 1864)
- 29 December — Alfred Arthur Greenwood Hales, novelist (born 1860)

== See also ==
- 1936 in Australia
- 1936 in literature
- 1936 in poetry
- List of years in Australian literature
- List of years in literature
