= 1876 in Australian literature =

This article presents a list of the historical events and publications of Australian literature during 1876.

== Books ==
- Rolf Boldrewood — A Colonial Reformer
- James Brunton Stephens — A Hundred Pounds

== Children's fiction ==
- Robert Richardson — Our Junior Mathematical Master; and, A Perilous Errand

== Poetry ==
- Robert Dudley Adams — "Trucanini's Dirge"
- Ernest Favenc — "Dead in the Queensland Bush"
- Henry Kendall
  - "Bill the Bullock Driver"
  - "Kingsborough"
- James Brunton Stephens — "Mute Discourse : A Poem"

== Births ==
- 6 February — Alice Guerin Crist, poet, author and journalist (died 1941)
- 20 March — Winifred Lewellin James, novelist (died 1941)
- 13 April — Ambrose Dyson, poet and artist (died 1913)
- 6 June — Amy Mack, writer, journalist and editor (died 1939)
- 2 September — Will Lawson, poet and novelist (died 1957)
- 7 September — C. J. Dennis, poet (died 1938)
- 4 October — Hugh McCrae, poet (died 1958)
- 5 October — John Bede Dalley, journalist and novelist (died 1935)
- 30 December — Archibald Strong, poet (died 1930)

== Deaths ==
- 24 May — Henry Kingsley, novelist (born 1830)

== See also ==
- 1876 in Australia
- 1876 in literature
- 1876 in poetry
- List of years in Australian literature
- List of years in literature
