= The Russell Affair =

1928 film

- Directed by: P. J. Ramster
- Written by: Juliette De La Ruze
- Produced by: Juliette De La Ruze
- Starring: Jessica Harcourt; Gaston Mervale
- Cinematography: William Trerise
- Release date: 4 October 1928
- Country: Australia
- Languages: Silent film; English intertitles
- Budget: £1,000

The Russell Affair is a 1928 Australian silent film directed by P. J. Ramster. It was Ramster's last film.

== Synopsis ==
An artist, Stephen Patrick, falls in love with his model, Juliette (Adrienne Stewart). Juliette is in love with Dr Lonsdale, who is engaged to a wealthy widow, Ruby Russell (Jessica Harcourt). Ruby destroys Patrick's paintings of Juliette in a jealous rage, but manages to get Juliette blamed. A blackmailer, Arthur White (Gaston Mervale), complicates things.

== Production ==
The movie was financed partly by Juliette De La Ruze, a woman anxious to get involved in film production. Filming took place in Sydney, partly at the studios of Australasian Films, Hyde Park and "in the homes of prominent society people and wound up in August 1928.

The star, Jessica Harcourt, previously appeared in the expensive silent productions, For the Term of His Natural Life (1927) and The Adorable Outcast (1928) and was also well known as a fashion model. She made no further films.

No copy exists today and it is considered a lost film.

== Cast ==
- Jessica Harcourt as Ruby Russell
- Gaston Mervale as Arthur White
- Adrienne Stewart as Juliette Hope
- Arthur McLaglen
- Fred Twitcham
- Arthur Clarke
- Robert Purdie
- Roy Paine
