= 1860 in Australian literature =

This article presents a list of the historical events and publications of Australian literature during 1860.

== Books ==
- Mary Theresa Vidal – Bengala, or, Some Time Ago
- Eliza Winstanley – Margaret Falconer

== Short stories ==
- Ellen Liston – "Cousin Lucy's Story"

== Poetry ==
- C. J. Carleton – South Australian Lyrics
- Charles Harpur – "Wellington"
- Basil E. Kendall – "Joys that Are No More"
- Henry Kendall
  - "Christmas Morning in the Bush"
  - "The Curlew Song"
- John Anthony Moore – Tasmanian Rhymings

== Births ==
A list, ordered by date of birth (and, if the date is either unspecified or repeated, ordered alphabetically by surname) of births in 1860 of Australian literary figures, authors of written works or literature-related individuals follows, including year of death.

- 14 April — George Robertson, bookseller and publisher (died 1933)
- 22 April — C. Haddon Chambers, dramatist (died 1921)
- 3 May – Emily Coungeau, poet (died 1936)
- 21 July — Alfred Arthur Greenwood Hales, novelist (died 1936)

== See also ==
- 1860 in Australia
- 1860 in literature
- 1860 in poetry
- List of years in literature
- List of years in Australian literature
