= Georg Stage =

Sailor training organization

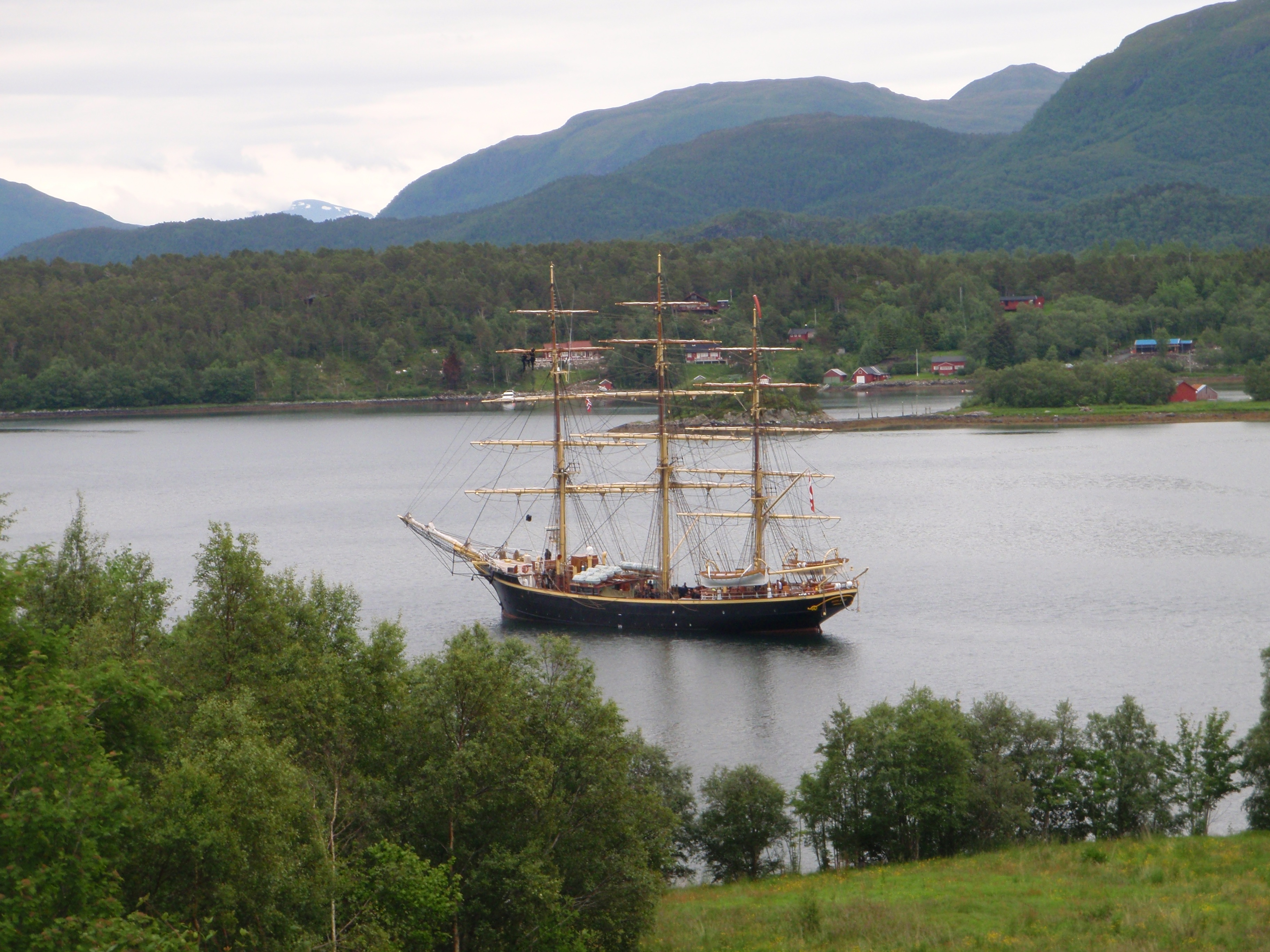
- Georg Stage in a Norwegian fjord

History

Denmark
- Name: Georg Stage
- Builder: Frederikshavn Værft og Flydedok
- Launched: 1934
- Acquired: 1934
- Commissioned: 1934
- Home port: Copenhagen, Denmark
- Identification: Call sign: OYKL; IMO number: 5128417; MMSI number: 219417000
- Status: Training ship

General characteristics
- Type: Sailing ship
- Displacement: 213 long tons (216 t)
- Length: 54 m (177 ft)
- Beam: 8.4 m (28 ft)
- Draft: 4.2 m (14 ft)
- Propulsion: Volvo Penta 368 kilowatts (493 hp) engine
- Sail plan: Full-rigged ship

Georg Stage is a name used by the independent foundation Georg Stages Minde that was established in 1882 by the shipowner Frederik Stage and his wife Thea. They recognized the need for better skills assessment and training of Denmark's sailors so the ship serves as a training-platform for sailors in Denmark. The ship memorialized their son, who died from tuberculosis in 1880, age 22.

== The ship #2 ==
The current Georg Stage is the second to be launched under that name. It was built during five months in 1934 at Frederikshavn Værft og Flydedok and was launched in 1934. It is a Danish iron-hulled, fully rigged, three-masted sailing ship. Its first tour started on 24 April 1935. It has since been refitted several times, most recently with the installation of a Volvo Penta main propulsion engine on 368 kilowatts (493 hp) in 2007. Over a length of 54 m (177 ft), a width of 8.4 m (28 ft) and draft of 4.2 m (14 ft) the ship spawns 20 sails with a total area of 860 m^{2} (9,300 sq ft), with the tallest mast extending 31 m (102 ft) above deck height. The original figurehead that remains in use from the "old" Georg Stage built in 1882 and depicts its namesake.

The ship has one tour per year, starting in April and ending in September, and has done so except during World War II; the mine danger was thought too significant so the ship was moored in Isefjorden. Following the war and until 1950, the ship each year took on two tours to recoup the war years.

In 1956 the Georg Stage participated in its first regatta, the predecessor to The Tall Ships' Races. The Georg Stage has continued to compete against the largest of the sailing ships such as Kruzenshtern, STS Mir, STS Sedov, Alexander von Humboldt and Christian Radich.

In 1989 Georg Stage made its first cross Atlantic Ocean voyage and paired up with its predecessor that was renamed the Joseph Conrad.

== Training aboard Georg Stage ==
Originally, training on the George Stage was restricted to the sailors in training aboard program so they could be trained in basic sailor and seamanship skills then muster with commercial vessels. The last year that there were 80 sailors aboard in training was in 1973. Since 1974 the ship serves 63 total program members each tour that also includes a chefs in training program, and a 10-person regular crew. The sailors and chefs in training participants must be between 17.5 and 22 years of age. Since 1981, females may also apply for the program. Since 2004 the Royal Danish Naval Academy aspirants have been trained aboard in basic seamanship; following the program completion the aspirants become cadets.

== The "original" Georg Stage ==
The first Georg Stage was built by the shipyard Burmeister & Wain on Refshaleøen in Copenhagen, Denmark. It was a fully rigged ship with a length of 36 m (118 ft), compared to 54 m (177 ft) of the "new" Georg Stage. The ship had a 50 metric horsepower (49 hp) auxiliary engine and a crew of 80 sailors in training and 10 officers.

On 25 June 1905 Georg Stage was in a collision with the English steamship Ancona in Hollænderdybet. The collision resulted in Georg Stage sinking, causing the deaths of 22 sailors in the program. Following the collision an eyewitness noted the following:

It was a great help for us, when the Swedish steam ship Irene, put light on the collision site, using her fine lights, which eased the rescue operation a lot. Our own great boat was put into the water, but rolled over and some of the sailors in training had to hold onto the great boat, until the boat from Ancona reached us.

The Georg Stage was raised, refitted and continued as a training ship until 1934, when it was put into retirement. It was bought and saved by an Australian, Alan Villiers, who renamed the ship Joseph Conrad after the Polish novelist. It went on a two-year-long tour starting in Ipswich (England) on 22 October 1934 and visit cities such as New York City (United States), Rio de Janeiro (Brazil), Cape Town (South Africa) and Sydney (Australia) as well as islands such as New Zealand and Tahiti. The ship ended its tour in New York on 16 October 1936 and Villiers then published two books about the tour: The Cruise of the "Conrad" and Stormalong.

Villiers went into bankruptcy following the tour and the ship was sold to the American millionaire George Huntington Hartford. Hartford updated the engine and for three years used the ship as yacht and participating in a race between the USA and Bermuda and bavc. In 1939 the ship was sold off to the Maritime Commission of USA for US$1.01. The ship once again went into service as a training ship until 1945, when it went into dock for two years and then transferred to Mystic Seaport Museum.

== Georg Stage in the Faroe Islands ==
The Georg Stage, has frequently visited the Faroe Islands as part of its annual sailing program. These visits are typically included in the ship's summer voyages, which take cadets to various North Atlantic and Northern European ports. The Faroe Islands, particularly the capital Tórshavn, are regular destinations due to their maritime significance and historical connections with Denmark.

During these visits, Georg Stage often opens to the public, allowing local residents and visitors to tour the vessel and learn about maritime training and life at sea. The ship's presence in the Faroe Islands contributes to the cultural exchange between the islands and Denmark and supports the preservation and promotion of traditional seafaring heritage.

== Sources ==
- Skoleskibet Georg Stage ..rigtige søfolk starter på Georg Stage, brief from the foundation Georg Stages Minde.
- www.georgstage.dk
- Mystic Seaport - The museum of America and the Sea
- Fire slideshows fra Tall Ships' Races 2007 i Århus, 5-8. juli 2007 hvor Georg Stage deltog sammen med 93 andre sejlskibe
