= Husky Be My Guide =

Book by F.J. Thwaites

- Author: F. J. Thwaites
- Language: English
- Publication date: 1957
- Publication place: Australia
- Followed by: Press on Regardless

Husky Be My Guide is a 1957 travel book by F. J. Thwaites. It was the first in a series of travel books written by Thwaites based on his real-life adventures.

== Plot ==
In 1955, author F. J. Thwaites, his wife Jessica Harcourt and their sons Gary and Roger, drive from London to Sydney via the Middle East. They arrived back in Sydney Australia in January 1956.

The trip was made in a Hillman Husky, hence the title of the book.

== Reception ==
According to one critic, the book was "a departure from Thwaites usual style of novel. At times he appears to lack color in his descriptions. His dialogue often lacks character, but this can be attributed to a desire to retain authenticity, It is only natural in a trip that took months of continuous travelling he would not be able remember or accurately record everything that occurred."

== Press on Regardless ==
Press on Regardless
- Author: F. J. Thwaites
- Language: English
- Genre: travel
- Publication date: 1960
- Publication place: Australia
- Preceded by: Husky Be My Guide
- Followed by: Destination Spain

Press on Regardless is a travel book by F. J. Thwaites. It was a sequel to Husky Be My Guide which had been successful enough to prompt the Thwaites family to take another long international trip by car.

The second book involved Thwaites, his wife and son Roger (Gary had work commitments), taking a car trip through Canada and South America and then to Europe.

The Thwaites took their car on a ferry from Australia in March 1958 and travelled to Canada. They arrived in Vancouver, drove down to Panama, then up to Texas and back to Canada. They crossed to Ireland and England, then to Scandinavia. They then travelled to Spain. By late December 1958 the Thwaites were back in Sydney.

A working title for the book was Your World Through Our Windshield.

== Destination Spain ==
Destination Spain
- Author: F. J. Thwaites
- Language: English
- Publisher: Harcourt Press
- Publication date: 1962
- Publication place: Australia
- Preceded by: Press on Regardless
- Followed by: Tracks I Knew Not

Destination Spain is the third travel book by F. J. Thwaites.

It covered the Thwaites family driving in a Hillman Estate car from Newcastle in England through Norway, Sweden, Denmark, Germany, Italy, France and Spain. They stay in Spain a number of months.

== Tracks I Knew Not ==
Tracks I Knew Not
- Author: F. J. Thwaites
- Language: English
- Publication date: 1973
- Publication place: Australia
- Preceded by: Destination Spain

Tracks I Knew Not is a 1973 travel book by F. J. Thwaites. It was the last work of Thwaites' published in his lifetime.

The book covered Thwaites travelling a Holden through twelve countries.
