= The Broken Melody =

The Broken Melody may refer to:

- The Broken Melody (1916 film), a silent British film directed by Cavendish Morton
- The Broken Melody (1919 film), a silent American film directed by William P.S. Earle
- The Broken Melody (1929 film), a silent British film directed by Fred Paul
- The Broken Melody (1934 film), a British musical drama film directed by Bernard Vorhaus
- The Broken Melody (1938 film), an Australian drama film directed by Ken G. Hall
- The Broken Melody (novel), a 1930 novel by F. J. Thwaites, basis of the 1938 film
- The Broken Melody, an 1896 Broadway play by Herbert Keen and James T. Tanner
- The Broken Melody, a composition by Auguste van Biene for the play
