= The Mad Doctor =

The Mad Doctor may refer to:

- The Mad Doctor (1933 film), a Mickey Mouse film
- The Mad Doctor (1941 film), a film starring Basil Rathbone
- The Mad Doctor (novel), a 1935 novel by F. J. Thwaites
- The Mad Doctor (also known as Dr. XXX) is fiction character Disney a human mad scientist who serves as an infrequent antagonist of Mickey's Mouse.
