= Joseph Conrad (ship) =

Danish-built museum ship in Connecticut

Coordinates: 41°21′45″N 71°57′55″W

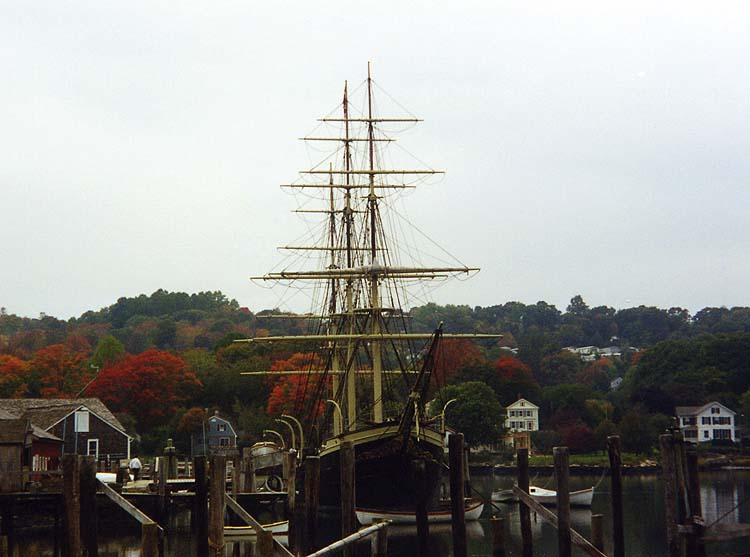

History

Denmark
- Name: Georg Stage (1882–c.1930)
- Namesake: Georg Stage
- Builder: Burmeister & Wain, Copenhagen, Denmark
- Launched: 1882
- Fate: Sold 1934

United Kingdom
- Name: Joseph Conrad
- Namesake: Joseph Conrad
- Owner: Alan Villiers
- Acquired: 1934
- Fate: Sold 1936

United States
- Name: Joseph Conrad
- Namesake: Joseph Conrad
- Owner: G.H. Hartford (1936–1939); Maritime Commission (1939–1947); Mystic Seaport (1947–Present)
- Out of service: 1945
- Home port: Mystic Seaport, Mystic, Connecticut
- Honors and awards: American Defense Service Medal; American Campaign Medal; Merchant Marine Atlantic War Zone Medal; World War II Victory Medal; Merchant Marine World War II Victory Medal
- Status: Museum and training ship

General characteristics
- Type: Sailing ship
- Length: 118 ft (36 m) sparred; 100 ft 8 in (30.68 m) on deck
- Beam: 25 ft 3 in (7.70 m)
- Draft: 12 ft (3.7 m)
- Sail plan: Full-rigged ship

Joseph Conrad is an iron-hulled sailing ship, originally launched as Georg Stage in 1882 and used to train sailors in Denmark. After sailing around the world as a private yacht in 1934 she served as a training ship in the United States, and is now a museum ship at Mystic Seaport in Connecticut.

== Service history ==
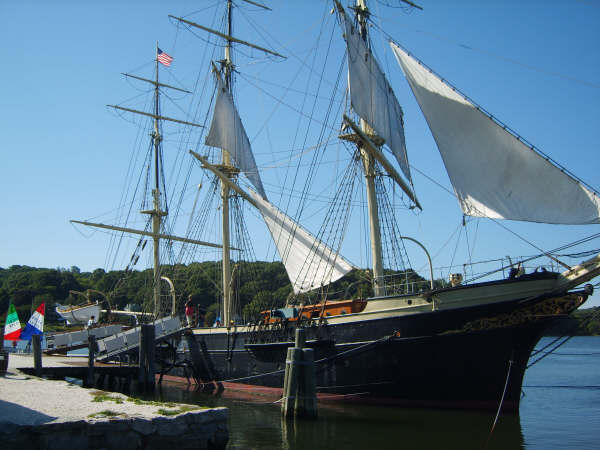
Joseph Conrad in 2008

Early in the morning on June 26th 1905, the ship sunk outside Copenhagen, after it was rammed by English merchant steamer Ancona. 22 boys aged 14-17 were killed. The tragedy could have cost many more lives, had it not been for part of the ship's crew being on deck watching fireworks from Tivoli Gardens. Most of the surviving boys clung to the ship's mizzenmast, which still stuck out of the water. In the subsequent sea trial, it was established that the steamer had misjudged the ships' trajectories. The ship was raised afterwards. It was on guard during WWI but was more of a merchant ship and not even moved from the harbor.

Australian sailor and author Alan Villiers saved Georg Stage from the scrappers and renamed the ship in honor of famed sea author Joseph Conrad. Villiers planned a circumnavigation with a crew of mostly boys. Joseph Conrad sailed from Ipswich on 22 October 1934, crossed the Atlantic Ocean to New York City, then down to Rio de Janeiro, Cape Town, and across the Indian Ocean and through the East Indies. After stops in Sydney, New Zealand, and Tahiti, Joseph Conrad rounded Cape Horn and returned to New York on 16 October 1936, having traveled a total of some 57,000 miles (92,000 km).

Villiers was bankrupted as a result of the expedition (although he did get three books out of the episode - Cruise of the Conrad, Stormalong, and Joey Goes to Sea), and sold the ship to Huntington Hartford, heir to the A&P supermarket fortune, who added an engine and used her as a yacht.

In 1939 Hartford donated Joseph Conrad to the United States Coast Guard for use as a training ship for the merchant marine based in Jacksonville, Florida. She participated in a training cruise through the Caribbean beginning in December, 1939 and sailed in the St. Petersburg to Havana Yacht Race in early 1941, a few months before the United States entered World War II. The Coast Guard turned the vessel over to the Maritime Administration when the merchant marine training functions of the Coast Guard were transferred to the newly created War Shipping Administration on September 1, 1942. Joseph Conrad continued to serve as a training ship until the war's end in 1945.

After being laid up for two years, the ship was transferred to Mystic Seaport in Stonington, Connecticut on July 9, 1947, for "museum and youth training purposes", where she has remained ever since as an exhibit. In addition to her role as a museum, she is also a static training vessel and is employed by Mystic Seaport to house campers attending the Joseph Conrad Sailing Camp.

== Awards ==
- American Defense Service Medal
- American Campaign Medal
- Merchant Marine Atlantic War Zone Medal
- World War II Victory Medal
- Merchant Marine World War II Victory Medal
