= The Night Closed Down =

Book by F.J. Thwaites

- 1949 edition
- Author: F. J. Thwaites
- Language: English
- Publisher: F. J. Thwaites
- Publication date: 1948
- Publication place: Australia

The Night Closed Down is a novel by F. J. Thwaites.
