= A Man of Destiny =

Book by F.J. Thwaites

- Author: F. J. Thwaites
- Language: English
- Publisher: F. J. Thwaites
- Publication date: 1938
- Publication place: Australia

A Man of Destiny is a 1938 novel by F. J. Thwaites. It was Thwaites' 12th novel.

== Plot ==
Peter Ashton kills the man responsible for his mother's death. He is sent to jail but escapes.
