= Whalers of the Midnight Sun =

1934 novel by Alan Villiers

Whalers of the Midnight Sun: A Story of Modern Whaling in the Antarctic
- Title page for Whalers of the Midnight Sun: A Story of Modern Whaling in the Antarctic (1934)
- Author: Alan J. Villiers
- Language: English
- Genre: children's fiction
- Publisher: Geoffrey Bles, London
- Publication date: 1934
- Publication place: Australia
- Media type: Print
- Pages: 285pp
- Preceded by: The Sea in Ships
- Followed by: Cruise of the Conrad

Whalers of the Midnight Sun: A Story of Modern Whaling in the Antarctic (1934) is an adventure novel for children by Australian author Alan J. Villiers and illustrated by Charles Pont. It won the Children's Book of the Year Award: Older Readers in 1950 after it had been published in Australia for the first time by Angus and Robertson.

== Plot outline ==
The novel follows the adventures of a fleet of seven ships in a Norwegian whaling expedition near the South Pole. The main characters of the book are a group of young boys who sign on for the expedition in Hobart, Tasmania.

== Critical reception ==
Len Barker in The Argus noted: "Mr. Villiers interweaves a fascinating documentary account of modem whaling with the story of a group of Australian ragamuffins, signed on in Hobart by the whaling fleet as extra hands. I have never read a better description of the bitter Antarctic winter or the operations of a whaling fleet."

A reviewer in The Age agreed with Barker's opinion: "Tragedy and ill-luck dog the expedition, but Mr. Villiers tells a wonderfully interesting and exciting story. His book will be one of the best you have read."

== See also ==
- 1934 in Australian literature
- 1950 in Australian literature
