= The Melody Lingers =

1935 novel by F. J. Thwaites

- Author: F. J. Thwaites
- Language: English
- Genre: Novel
- Publisher: Jackson and O'Sullivan
- Publication date: 1935
- Publication place: Australia
- Preceded by: The Broken Melody

The Melody Lingers is a 1935 Australian novel by F. J. Thwaites. It is a sequel to the author's debut novel The Broken Melody (1930).

== Plot ==
Dale Jenkins, heir to a rich property in the Riverina area of New South Wales, tries to become a writer.

== Dedication ==
The book was dedicated to Thwaites' great-grandfather "The King of the Riverina" who establishing Buckingbong Station in 1827.

== Publication history ==
After the novel's initial publication in Australian in 1935 it was reprinted as follows:

- 1935 New Century Press, Australia
- 1938 Quality Press, UK
- 1947 Peter Huston, Australia
- 1950s H. John Edwards, Australia (as part of the publisher's Red-Back Paperback series)

== Adaptation ==
The novel was adapted for radio in 1936.

== Reception ==
The Sydney Morning Herald said "from a purely literary standpoint, the book scarcely calls for criticism, but for renders of a certain type it will doubtless have its own sentimental appeal."

The Labor Daily said it "must enhance the reputation of the popular author."

The Sydney Mail said "The reader will meet some old friends from The Broken Melody in the new novel, and may very well enjoy this renewal of acquaintanceship. The Melody Lingers is quite up to the standard of this author's earlier novels."
