= They Lived That Spring =

Book by F.J. Thwaites

- First edition cover
- Author: F. J. Thwaites
- Language: English
- Publisher: F. J. Thwaites
- Publication date: 1946
- Publication place: Australia

They Lived That Spring is a novel by F. J. Thwaites.

It was adapted for radio in 1947.
