= White Moonlight =

Book by F.J. Thwaites

- Author: F. J. Thwaites
- Language: English
- Publication date: 1957
- Publication place: Australia

White Moonlight is a 1957 Australian novel by F. J. Thwaites.

It was adapted for radio in 1960.
