= Oasis of Shalimar =

Book by F.J. Thwaites

- First edition
- Author: F. J. Thwaites
- Language: English
- Publisher: H John Edwards
- Publication date: 1950
- Publication place: Australia

Oasis of Shalimar is a novel by F. J. Thwaites which was "set in New Zealand and India".

It was adapted for radio in the 1960s.
