= Sea and Spinifex =

1934 short story collection by Australian writer Vance Palmer

- Author: Vance Palmer
- Language: English
- Genre: Short story collection
- Publisher: Shakespeare Head Press
- Publication date: 1934
- Publication place: Australia
- Media type: Print
- Pages: 288 pp.

Sea and Spinifex (1934) is a short story collection by Australian writer Vance Palmer.

It was originally published in Australia by Shakespeare Head Press in 1934.

== Contents ==
The collection consists of 18 short stories from a variety of sources, with some published here for the first time.

- "The Seahawk"
- "Magic of It : The Branscombe Sisters"
- "Johnny"
- "The Trap"
- "The Little Duck"
- "The Rainbow-Bird"
- "Mameluke : The Last Laugh"
- "The Dingo"
- "Holiday"
- "The Mob"
- "Young Girl's Fancy"
- "The Dark Bird"
- "Stowaways"
- "The Present"
- "Travelling"
- "Monday Morning"
- "Ambergris"
- "Home"

== Critical reception ==
A reviewer in The Bulletin was impressed with the originality of the collection: "This is an Australian book in the true sense. Its 18 sketches range over a vast field of characteristic matter scarcely yet prospected by Australian genius." They concluded that Palmer is "in the front rank of short-story writers."

In The Adelaide Chronicle the reviewer found that "Palmer has a style all his own. His stories do not depend so much on their plots for their effect, but rather on their brilliant characterisations and the conciseness of their telling." They went on to note that reader should persist: "The stories in this book are all well told. Some of them may sound bitter to the reader, but their real worth will be seen on a second reading."

== See also ==
- 1934 in Australian literature
