= That Was the Hour =

1956 novel by F.J. Thwaites

That was the Hour
- Author: F. J. Thwaites
- Language: English
- Publisher: H. John Edwards
- Publication date: 1956
- Publication place: Australia
- Pages: 288

That Was the Hour is a 1956 romantic adventure novel by F. J. Thwaites, originally published in Australia by H. John Edwards.

== Synopsis ==
The novel is set in New Zealand and involves a "romantic saga about a handsome doctor and a beautiful French widow, it is set mainly in a Wairoa village." It also features the 1886 eruption of Mount Tarawera.

== Publication history ==
After the novel's initial publication by H. John Edwards in Australia in 1956 it was reprinted as follows:

- 1967 Harcourt Press, Australia
- 1969 Harcourt Press, UK
- 1977 Angus and Robertson, Australia

== Adaptation ==
In 1964 the novel was adapted into a play for radio. It was broadcast on 2CH in Sydney from 29 June 1964.
