= Roof Over Heaven =

Book by F.J. Thwaites

- Author: F. J. Thwaites
- Language: English
- Publisher: H. John Edwards
- Publication date: 1953
- Publication place: Australia

Roof Over Heaven is the 22nd novel by F. J. Thwaites.

The Daily Telegraph said "Thwaites has packed plenty of drama and an almost unlimited amount of melodrama into his new novel."

The book was a best seller in Australia.

== Premise ==
John Summerless, an Australian engineer, moves to Hong Kong and becomes a POW of the Japanese in World War Two. His wife runs off with a gangster. John's child dies. He winds up in Broome.
