= No Love to Give =

Book by F.J. Thwaites

- Author: F. J. Thwaites
- Language: English
- Publisher: Harcourt Press
- Publication date: 1969
- Publication place: Australia

No Love to Give is a novel by F. J. Thwaites. It was his 34th novel and like many of them incorporated current events in the plot.

== Plot ==
A woman, Janna, flees Czechoslovakia in 1968 and makes her way to Australia. She meets an Australian Vietnam War veteran.
