= A Mountain for Monique =

Book by F.J. Thwaites

- Author: F. J. Thwaites
- Language: English
- Publisher: Harcourts
- Publication date: 1964
- Publication place: Australia

A Mountain for Monique is a novel by F. J. Thwaites.

It was adapted for radio in 1965.
