= The Mad Doctor (novel) =

Book by F.J. Thwaites

- Author: F. J. Thwaites
- Language: English
- Publisher: Jackson & O'Sullivan
- Publication date: 1935
- Publication place: Australia

The Mad Doctor is a 1935 novel by Australian author F. J. Thwaites, a melodramatic medical romance set in Africa.

Thwaites based the novel on a story he heard from an old man while crossing the Atlantic in 1933. However, he changed the tragic ending to a more optimistic one.

The novel was adapted for the radio.

== Plot ==
A Sydney surgeon is sent to jail. When he gets out, finding himself a social outcast, he goes to work in the African jungle. Although he only works among the native Africans, his reputation as a miracle worker in cases of paralysis spreads far and wide.

== Adaptation ==
The novel was adapted for radio in Adelaide in 1936. During the production of this, Thwaites met the actress Jessica Harcourt, who he later married.

== The Mad Doctor in Harley Street ==
The Mad Doctor in Harley Street
- Author: F. J. Thwaites
- Language: English
- Publication date: 1938
- Publication place: Australia

The Mad Doctor in Harley Street is a 1938 novel by F. J. Thwaites. A sequel to The Mad Doctor, it describes the doctor's efforts to get his cure recognised by the medical establishment in London. A contemporary review says that the novel "bubbles over with sentimentalism."

The novel was adapted for radio in 1938.
