= Fever (Thwaites novel) =

Book by F.J. Thwaites

- Author: F. J. Thwaites
- Language: English
- Publisher: F. J. Thwaites
- Publication date: 1939
- Publication place: Australia

Fever is a 1939 novel by F. J. Thwaites.

Thwaites researched it on a trip to the Pacific Islands with his wife.

== Plot ==
Two young men become medical researchers and go to work in Africa.

== Radio ==
The novel was serialised for Australian radio in 1940. Announcer Si Meredith read out extracts from the novel over a number of episodes.
