= The Defender (Thwaites novel) =

Book by F.J. Thwaites

- Author: F. J. Thwaites
- Language: English
- Publisher: Jackson & O'Sullivan
- Publication date: 1936
- Publication place: Australia

The Defender is a 1936 novel by F. J. Thwaites. It was his eighth novel.

In 1937 the novel was reprinted in the United Kingdom.

In 1937, it was announced a film version of the novel would be made at National Studios, following production of The Flying Doctor, but the movie did not eventuate.

There were allegations Thwaites plagiarised from a story in Master Detective magazine, "The Startling Mystery Aboard the SS Chinese Prince". This was in addition to plagiarism accusations made by Thwaites about his earlier novel Flames of Convention. Smith's Weekly commented "It must be very discouraging to Mr. Thwaites that whether he lifts slabs from a best seller by an author who was murdered over 25 years ago before he finished his book, or carves slices out of one of thousands of American crime magazine publications, the theft is still detected by someone. "Smith's" almost feels like apologising to him about it."

The novel was adapted for the radio in 1936. Sections of the novel were read out over a number of episodes four days a week.

== Premise ==
A Sydney barrister defends downtrodden women.
