= Whispers in Tahiti =

Book by F.J. Thwaites

- Author: F. J. Thwaites
- Language: English
- Genre: adventure
- Publication date: 1940
- Publication place: Australia

Whispers in Tahiti is an Australian 1940 novel by F. J. Thwaites. It was translated into French.

== Plot ==
A young man who is told he only has a short time to live decides to leave England.

== Background ==
Thwaites researched the novel on a boat trip from Australia to England with his wife.

== Adaptations ==
A song inspired by the book was issued in 1947.

The novel was adapted for radio in 1948 and in 1953.
