= The Dark Abyss =

Book by F.J. Thwaites

- Author: F. J. Thwaites
- Language: English
- Publisher: H. John Edwards
- Publication date: 1951
- Publication place: Australia
- English publication date: 1955

The Dark Abyss is a 1951 novel. It is about Captain Saunders who is injured in the Korean War then falls in love with Dr Balant.

The book was the first published by a company Thwaites set up for English readers, Harcourts.

The novel was adapted for Australia radio in 1955. This was a 30-minute radio serial that broadcast until 1956.

The Liverpool Post called it a "hotch potch" which "has to be read to be believed."
