= Rock End =

Book by F.J. Thwaites

- Author: F. J. Thwaites
- Language: English
- Publisher: F. J. Thwaites
- Publication date: 1937
- Publication place: Australia

Rock End is a 1937 novel by F. J. Thwaites. It was his tenth novel and was published by his own company.

Australian Woman's Mirror said the novel "has nothing new in plot or development, but it makes easy reading—a simple tale with nothing unpleasant about it and set against a recognisable city and country background."
