= No Rainbow in the Sky =

Book by F.J. Thwaites

- Author: F. J. Thwaites
- Language: English
- Publisher: H. John Edwards
- Publication date: 1959
- Publication place: Australia
- Followed by: Beyond the Rainbow

No Rainbow in the Sky is a 1959 Australian novel by F. J. Thwaites.

Storm Hannaford is injured during the Korean War. He is flown to Sydney and operated on by a plastic surgeon.

== Adaptation ==
It was adapted into radio in 1965.

== Beyond the Rainbow ==
Beyond the Rainbow
- Author: F. J. Thwaites
- Language: English
- Publisher: Leisure Productions
- Publication date: 1961
- Publication place: Australia
- Preceded by: No Rainbow in the Sky

Beyond the Rainbow is a 1961 novel by F. J. Thwaites. It was a sequel to No Rainbow in the Sky.

It was adapted for radio in 1966.
