= Out of the Dawn =

Book by F.J. Thwaites

- Author: F. J. Thwaites
- Language: English
- Publisher: F. J. Thwaites
- Publication date: 1944
- Publication place: Australia

Out of the Dawn is a 1944 Australian novel by F. J. Thwaites.

== Premise ==
A veteran of World War One watches his son become involved in a tragedy.
