= Hell's Doorway =

1932 novel by F.J. Thwaites

- Author: F. J. Thwaites
- Language: English
- Genre: Adventure novel
- Publisher: Jackson & O'Sullivan
- Publication date: 1932
- Publication place: Australia

Hell's Doorway is a 1932 adventure novel by Australian author F. J. Thwaites.

== Plot ==
Vallance Hunter is a Sydney medical student whose mother is dying of cancer. Vallance euthanizes her and is sent to prison. After two years, he escapes from Goulburn Gaol and goes to live on a cattle station in the Wolgan Valley run by a grazier and his daughter. He falls in love with the daughter and goes blind.

== Background ==
Sales of the novel boomed after it was read out on 2UE radio. This led to Thwaites' novels being routinely adapted for radio.

The novel sold over 27,000 copies within its first year. Sales of The Broken Melody and this were described as "remarkable".

== Reception ==
The book critic in the Sydney Morning Herald said that "Mr Thwaites writes vigorously and extracts the last ounce of excitement from the sensational elements of his plot. His characters, however, appear to be somewhat unreal, probably because Mr Thwaites has not mastered the art of writing good dialogue, and because he is regrettably prone to sentimentality."
