= Sky Full of Thunder =

Book by F.J. Thwaites

- Author: F. J. Thwaites
- Language: English
- Publisher: Harcourt Press
- Publication date: 1968
- Publication place: Australia

Sky Full of Thunder is a 1968 novel by F. J. Thwaites.

== Premise ==
Austin Herrington, at home on the Murray River during his school holidays, encounters an escapee from a prison farm. The parents of his friend Felicity Ainsworth have to sell their adjourning property and live abroad. Ten years later, Austin is conscripted to serve in the Vietnam War and is injured in action.
