= Shall Come a Time =

Book by F. J. Thwaites

- Author: F. J. Thwaites
- Language: English
- Publisher: Harcourt Press
- Publication date: 1967
- Publication place: Australia

Shall Come a Time is a 1967 novel by F. J. Thwaites.
