= For the Term of His Natural Life (1927 film) =

1927 film

- Directed by: Norman Dawn
- Written by: Norman Dawn; Gayne Dexter (titles)
- Based on: novel by Marcus Clarke
- Produced by: Norman Dawn
- Starring: George Fisher; Eva Novak; Dunstan Webb
- Cinematography: Bert Cross; Len Roos; John William Trerise
- Edited by: Katherine Dawn; Norman Dawn; Mona Donaldson
- Production companies: Australasian Films; A Union Master Picture
- Distributed by: Union Theatres (Australia); Standard Film (USA)
- Release dates: 20 June 1927 (Australia); 1 October 1927 (UK); 4 June 1929 (U.S.)
- Running time: 102 minutes
- Country: Australia
- Language: English
- Budget: £50,000 or £60,000
- Box office: £40,000 (by 1928) or £50,000 (by Dec 1928)

For the Term of His Natural Life is a 1927 Australian film based on the 1874 novel by Marcus Clarke, directed, produced and co-written by Norman Dawn. It was the most expensive Australian silent film made and remains one of the most famous Australian films of the silent era.

== Plot ==
After an argument, Lady Elinor Devine reveals to her husband, Sir Richard, that he is not actually the father of their son, also named Richard, but that he was fathered by her cousin, Lord Bellasis. Sir Richard throws his son out and storms off in a rage. Shortly afterwards, Richard Junior finds his biological father dead in the forest. Only the viewer and an unidentified witness know that Lord Bellasis has actually been killed by his own son, known as John Rex. However, it is Richard Devine who is found next to the body and arrested. Thinking that his father killed Bellasis, Richard wants to protect his mother's reputation and gives his name as Rufus Dawes.

The convict ship that brings Dawes to Van Diemen's Land also carries the new governor Vickers and his wife and his daughter Sylvia. The commander of the ship is the brutal Maurice Frere. With the Vickers is a young girl, Sarah Purfoy, as a nurse to the child. However, she really is the fiancée of John Rex, convicted for forgery, and tries to help the convicts take the ship. The rebellion is led by a murderer named Gabbett. They fail when Dawes overhears their plans and manages to warn an officer, while being brought to a quarantine room for the sick. Gabbett decides to claim that Dawes was the actual ringleader.

A few years later, Frere comes to visit Vickers and shows interest in Sylvia, who has grown to be a beautiful young woman. Gabbett has come back after an escape and hints that he cannibalized his comrades to survive. Dawes, who is kept in solitary confinement on an island before the coast, attempts to drown himself. Frere has brought Vickers the order to give up the settlement and move to Port Arthur. Vickers embarks the convicts and sails with them. A smaller boat is supposed to carry Frere, Mrs Vickers and Sylvia, but is taken by John Rex, who maroons the three on the abandoned shore. Dawes finds them there a few days later and manages to inspire in them a new will to live. Sylvia especially takes to him very much and convinces him to make a boat, but Mrs Vickers dies before they can leave and makes Dawes promise to look after her daughter. The three survivors are found later by Vickers who has started to search for them. Frere takes the credit for saving Sylvia, who is herself unable to remember a thing after waking. Dawes is put back into prison.

Later again, it is shortly before the wedding of Sylvia and Frere. John Rex has been captured and Sarah Purfoy begs Frere to save his life by saying that he left them food and weapons. She threatens to reveal his past with some of the women in the settlement to Sylvia, and Frere complies. Dawes, who also testifies, is shocked to find that Sylvia cannot remember him. He escapes on the night of the wedding to speak to Sylvia but is apprehended. The next day, Cranky Brown, a young convict, is sentenced to a flogging, despite the protests of the reverend North. Dawes is ordered to carry out the punishment. He refuses to do so after Brown faints and is flogged himself. Upon finding that Brown is dead, Dawes curses Frere.

John Rex has planned another escape with the help of Gabbett. Dawes refuses to leave with them but asks Rex to post a letter for him. John Rex manages to escape with Sarah's help, while Gabbett and five other men get lost in the wilderness. Gabbett again starts killing and eating his comrades to survive. When he arrives at the shore, he is found by a group of sailors, who kill him. Rex reads Dawes letter in Sydney and understands his striking resemblance to Dawes, since they have the same father. He returns to England, where Lady Devine first accepts him as her son, but begins to become suspicious when he starts spending the family fortune. She confronts him with the fact that Richard was illegitimate, and Rex confesses to what happened.

Some years later again, Dawes is on Norfolk Island. Frere is on his way there to restore order. He quickly finds out that Dawes is the core of a rebellious "ring" whose members avenge every punishment through violence. The heavy punishments to which he sentences Dawes break him after some days. Reverend North becomes a close friend of Sylvia and when he visits Dawes in the hospital, the latter begs him to talk to Sylvia. Frere quickly learns about their friendship and after North infuriates him, he punishes Dawes. One evening, he finds North and Sylvia in an embrace and suspects his wife is unfaithful. After he strikes her, Sylvia takes the next boat to the mainland; to her father. North goes to visit Dawes and confesses to him that he witnessed the murder of Lord Bellasis, but did not tell anyone because Lord Bellasis held banknotes that North had forged. He gives Dawes his coat and tells him to go and see Sylvia. A storm breaks loose. The ship is about to sink as North frees the Norfolk Island convicts, who go after Frere. Sylvia recognises Dawes shortly before the ship sinks; and at the same time, the convicts kill Frere. The next morning finds Dawes and Sylvia on a plank in calm waters.

== Cast ==
- George Fisher as Rufus Dawes / John Rex
- Eva Novak as Sylvia Vickers
- Dunstan Webb as Maurice Frere
- Jessica Harcourt as Sarah Purfoy
- Arthur McLaglen as Gabbett
- Katherine Dawn as Mrs. Vickers
- Gerald Kay Souper as Major Vickers
- Marion Marcus Clarke as Lady Devine
- Arthur Tauchert as Warden Troke
- Beryl Gow as Sylvia Vickers as child
- Compton Coutts as Reverend Meekin
- Mayne Lynton as Reverend North
- Carlton Stuart as Commandant Burgess
- William O'Hanlon as The Crow
- Arthur Greenaway as Lord Bellasis
- Edward Howell as Kirkpatrick
- Fred Twitcham as Surgeon Pine
- Charles Weatherby as Captain Blunt
- Steve Murphy as Jeremy Vetch
- Jimmy McMahon as convict boy 1
- Hartney Arthur as convict boy 2

== Production ==
=== Pre-production ===
The novel had previously been filmed in 1908 and 1911. Australasian Films had made five films since reactivating production in the mid 1920s but none of them had made much international impact. They thought a big budget version of the classic novel might prove popular with overseas as well as Australian audiences.

The project was originally budgeted at £15,000 to be directed by Raymond Longford and starring Frank Harvey. Australasian, however, wanted an American release, and accordingly hired an American director, Norman Dawn, and imported American stars. Australasian promised Longford work on other films, but soon allowed his contract to lapse.

Norman Dawn was in Australia to make a series of scenic shorts and was offered the job by William Gibson of Australasian. The budget was raised to £40,000.

During pre-production, questions were asked in the Commonwealth Parliament whether the film should be exported because it depicted Australia's convict past. Hollywood was making an increasing number of films on location around this time such as Chang, The Trail of '98 and The Covered Wagon, and For the Term of His Natural Life was grouped with these.

=== Differences from novel ===
- The end was changed to a slightly more optimistic one. In the book, Dawes and Sylvia are already dead the next morning.
- In the book, Maurice Frere is Richard Devine's cousin.
- In the movie, North gives Dawes his coat and tells him to see Sylvia. In the book, he simply drops his coat and hat in Dawes' cell, who manages to escape because the guard is drunk.
- Frere is not killed in the book.
- "The Crow" is James "Jemmy" (not Jeremy) Vetch's nickname. In the movie, they are two different persons.
- Sylvia is still a child (eleven years old) at the time of the mutiny, whereas in the movie, she is already a young lady.
- In the book, Peter "Cranky" Brown is a twelve-year-old child, who suicides himself. The person named Cranky Brown in the movie is called Kirkland in the book.
- John Rex's death after a stroke is left out in the book.

=== Casting ===
Gibson claimed he tested Australian actors to play the leads but was unable to find people of sufficient quality. Accordingly, four main roles were given to Americans, Eva Novak, George Fisher, Steve Murphy and Katherine Dawn, who arrived in Australia in August 1926. The cast also included:

- Arthur McLaglen, a boxer and vaudeville performer who was touring Australia; brother of Victor McLaglen
- Marion Marcus Clarke, daughter of Marcus Clarke
- Jessica Harcourt, female model
- Dunstan Webb, actor and director for Australasian Films

=== Shooting ===
Filming began on 10 August 1926. Great attempts were made to ensure the authenticity of sets and costumes with period costumes being borrowed from Hobart museum and duplicated. After some studio scenes shot at Australasian's Bondi studio, the unit shifted to Port Arthur. Dawn had originally planned to film the Hells Gates and Grummet Island scenes at their original locations in Macquarie Harbour, but his plans changed during the shoot. According to the Hobart Mercury, "he said the cliffs at the Gate, and the general appearance, were not such as he had visualised for his picture...In regard to the scene where Rufus Dawes is chained to Grummett Rock, this could be got close to his base of operations." Instead, several establishing shots were taken of Macquarie Harbour and the town of Strahan.

In October, the unit returned to Sydney to film prison interiors at the studio. An old sailing ship, the Inca, had been reconditioned and was used for scenes in Sydney Harbour. The prison escape scene was shot on the banks of the Parramatta River near Ryde at a cost of £1,200 for one day's shooting. Other scenes were shot at the convict-built gaol at Berrima and Wombeyan Caves. Throughout production, a trio of musicians played mood music on the set to help the cast with their performances.

The budget eventually blew out to a reported £60,000. Some have even claimed it went as high as £70,000 although Stuart F. Doyle of Australasian put the official figure at £50,000.

== Release ==
The movie was an enormous success at the Australian box office but did poorly overseas, in part due to the emergence of talking films in 1928.

=== US release ===
The presence of American stars and directors meant the film was publicized in the US but was not released there until 1929. It was estimated the combined losses of this film and Norman Dawn's follow-up, The Adorable Outcast (1928), came to £30,000. Cinesound Productions announced plans to remake it with sound in 1932 but this never seems have been seriously pursued.

== Restoration ==
The movie was restored by Graham Shirley and screened at the 1981 Sydney Film Festival.

It was based primarily on an incomplete Australian release, comprising less than half of the original film; an American release, provided by the American Film Institute, consisting "almost entirely of variant takes and out-takes" which were usually of lesser quality; images reused in the 1933 Cinesound Productions travelogue Ghosts of Port Arthur; outtakes and stills from the National Film and Sound Archive; and new intertitles for the remaining gaps.

The film underwent a complete digital restoration by Australia's National Film and Sound Archive in 2024–25, and was screened in Canberra, Sydney and Melbourne in 2025.

== See also ==
- Cinema of Australia
