= Return to Coolami =

1936 novel by Eleanor Dark

- Author: Eleanor Dark
- Language: English
- Genre: Novel
- Publisher: Collins, England
- Publication date: 1936
- Publication place: Australia
- Media type: Print
- Pages: 319
- Preceded by: Prelude to Christopher
- Followed by: Sun Across the Sky

Return to Coolami (1936) is a novel by Australian author Eleanor Dark. It won the ALS Gold Medal in 1936.

== Plot summary ==
The novel relates the story of Bret Maclean who has travelled to Sydney to bring his young wife, Susan, to his station home in central New South Wales. On the two-day journey the young couple are accompanied by her parents, Tom and Millicent Drew. The novel is set during this journey and lays out the life story of each of the four travellers.

== Reviews ==
A reviewer in The Courier-Mail stated: "The author has a delicacy of touch that such a situation requires, and her method of explaining the whole lives of the four travellers reminds one somewhat of Dorothy Richardson's 'stream of consciousness' in the Miriam Henderson books, or of Norah James (in Jealousy). But there is nothing of imitation in Eleanor Dark, she is superbly herself and most definitely an author to watch."

A reviewer in The Truth found that the novel owed a little too much to cinematic technique: "The screen came into its own when it discovered its power thus to mingle the past and present; but in a story closer attention is demanded to follow the changes than the average reader will give."

== Awards and nominations ==
- 1936 winner ALS Gold Medal
