= The Timeless Land =

Novel by Eleanor Dark

- First US edition (publ. Macmillan)
- Author: Eleanor Dark
- Language: English
- Series: The Timeless Land
- Genre: Historical fiction
- Publisher: Macmillan
- Publication date: 1941
- Publication place: Australia
- Media type: Print
- Pages: 499 pp
- Preceded by: The Little Company
- Followed by: Storm of Time

The Timeless Land (1941) is a work of historical fiction by Eleanor Dark (1901–1985). The novel The Timeless Land is the first of The Timeless Land trilogy of novels about European settlement and exploration of Australia.

== Story and characters ==
The narrative is told from European and Aboriginal points of view. The novel begins with two Aboriginal men watching the arrival of the First Fleet at Sydney Harbour on 26 January 1788. The novel describes the first years of the colony and the diplomacy of captain Arthur Phillip, famine and the effects of outside diseases on the previously unexposed Aboriginal population. The novel ends in a dramatic climax when troops encounter an escaped convict. Dark conducted her historical research at the Mitchell Library in Sydney. Watkin Tench, author of The Complete Account of the Settlement at Port Jackson, is a key character in The Timeless Land. The book was reprinted in 2002 and the novel was on the curriculum for high school students in Australia in the mid-twentieth century.

The subsequent books in The Timeless Land trilogy are Storm of Time (1948) and No Barrier (1953).

== Reception ==
It sold more than 50,000 copies in Australia.

== Television production ==
The Timeless Land
- Genre: mini-series
- Based on: The Timeless Land trilogy by Eleanor Dark
- Written by: Peter Yeldham
- Directed by: Rob Stewart; Michael Carson
- Starring: Nicola Pagett; Ray Barrett; Heather Christie; Michael Craig
- Country of origin: Australia
- Original language: English
- No. of episodes: 8

Production
- Producer: Ray Alchin
- Running time: 8 × 1 hour

Original release
- Network: ABC Television
- Release: 4 September – 23 October 1980

A television series was produced and broadcast by the Australian Broadcasting Commission, premiering on 4 September 1980. It was written by Peter Yeldham, based on the Eleanor Dark novels, and starred Charles Yunupingu as Bennelong and English actress Nicola Pagett (star of the British series Upstairs, Downstairs) as Mrs. Mannion. Other actors included Ray Barrett and John Frawley. The music was by Bruce Smeaton.

Production of the series had first been announced in 1976 but was postponed due to the large budget required. International rights to the series were sold to Paramount for $1 million. Shooting took place in Kellyville, an outer suburb of Sydney.

The 8 episodes of The Timeless Land commenced with a movie-length premiere:

1. A Ship with White Wings (1788)
2. Unsuitable Company (1790)
3. The Fabric of Liberty (1799)
4. Double Standards (1800)
5. Smell of Rebellion (1804)
6. A Declaration of War (1806)
7. A Prisoner at the Bar (1807)
8. A New Order (1809)

In 2006, the Australian Broadcasting Commission released the television series on 3 DVDs, the episodes totalling 424 minutes.

=== Cast ===
Major characters

- Michael Craig as Stephen Mannion (ep. 1–6)
- Peter Collingwood as Governor Phillip (ep. 1–2)
- Angela Punch McGregor as Ellen Prentice (ep. 1–7)
- Charles Yunupingu as Bennelong (ep. 1–2)
- Adam Garnett (ep. 1–2) and Chris Haywood (ep. 3–8) as Johnny Prentice
- Brian Hinzlewood as Captain George Johnston (ep. 1–2, guest ep. 3–7)
- Anna Volska as Sarah (ep. 1, guest ep. 2)
- Noel Trevarthen as Collins (ep. 1–2)
- Robin Stewart as John MacArthur (ep. 2–8)
- Nicola Pagett as Conor Mannion (ep. 3–8)
- John Frawley as Governor King (ep. 3–5, guest ep. 6)
- Patrick Dickson as Mark Harvey (ep. 3–8)
- Don Markham as Merrett (ep. 3–4)
- Max Cullen as Byrne (ep. 5, 8, guest ep. 7)
- Ray Barrett as Governor Bligh (ep. 6–8)
- Geneviève Picot as Emily (ep. 7–8, guest ep. 5–6)
- Peter Cousens as Patrick Mannion (ep. 7–8, guest ep. 3–4, 6)

Secondary cast

- David Gulpilil as Colbee (ep. 1–2)
- Russell Keifel as Wilson (ep. 1–2)
- Tim Hughes as Marine Sergeant (ep. 1–2)
- Brian Moll as Reverend Johnson (ep. 1–3)
- Brian Blain as Balmain (ep. 1–2)
- John Fitzgerald as Captain Tench (ep. 1–2)
- Brian Anderson as Miller (ep. 1–2)
- Trevor Kent as Major Ross (ep. 1–2)
- Matthew Larkum as Patrick (ep. 1–2)
- Ric Hutton as Lord Sydney (ep. 1)
- Liddy Holloway as Mrs. Johnson (ep. 1–2)
- Louise Lenay as Esther (ep. 2)
- Jennifer De Greenlaw as Mrs. MacArthur (ep. 2)
- Johnny Johnstone as Evans (ep. 3–7)
- Heather Christie as Anne King (ep. 3–5)
- Clive Marshall as Lynch (ep. 3–5, 7–8)
- Leo Taylor as Tom Towns (ep. 3)
- Basil Clarke as Governor Hunter (ep. 3)
- Les Foxcroft as Sailor (ep. 3)
- Desmond Tester as Palmer (ep. 3)
- Don Mamouney as Doolan (ep. 3–5)
- Athol Compton as Billalong (ep. 3–4, 7–8)
- Alex Kovacs as Sergeant N.S.W. Corps (ep. 3)
- Gareth Wilding-Forbes as Officer (ep. 3)
- Graham Keating as Auctioneer (ep. 3)
- Olive Bodill as Mrs. Blair (ep. 3)
- Charlie Strachan as Driver (ep. 4)
- Ralph Cotterill as Finn (ep. 4–6)
- Kate Parker as Mrs. Blake (ep. 4)
- Michael K. Ross as Governor's Aide (ep. 4)
- John Cousins as Reverend Marsden (ep. 5)
- Vic Hunter as Captain Abbott (ep. 5)
- Vincent Gil as Cunningham (ep. 5)
- Robert Hughes as Captain Kemp (ep. 5, 7–8)
- Bill McCluskey as Winden (ep. 5)
- Kirrily Nolan as Mary Putland (ep. 6–8)
- Phillip de Carle as Farmer Thorne (ep. 6)
- Paul Mayberry as Settler in Street (ep. 6)
- Norman Grant as Pig Farmer (ep. 6)
- John Faasen as George Crossley (ep. 7)
- John Hamblin as Robert Campbell (ep. 7–8)
- Peter Kowitz as Gregory Blaxland (ep. 7–8)
- Gary Duggan as Chaplain (ep. 7)
- Rev Jones as Constable Oakes (ep. 7)
- Ray Marshall as Sergeant Major Whittle (ep. 7)
- John Armstrong as Judge Atkins (ep. 7)
- Paul Hunt as Courtroom Settler (ep. 7)
- Tony Wager as Governor Macquarie (ep. 8)
- Elizabeth Coulter as Elizabeth Macquarie (ep. 8)
- Rodney Kay as Williams (ep. 8)
- Fiona Paul as Flora (ep. 8)
- Lois Cook as Moola (ep. 8)

== Editions ==
- The Timeless Land, Eleanor Dark. Introduction by Barbara Brooks and Humphrey McQueen. Pymble, NSW. HarperCollins Publishers Australia. 2002. ISBN 0-207-19877-2

== See also ==
- Marcus Clarke, For the Term of His Natural Life (1870–1872)
- Robert Hughes, The Fatal Shore (1987)
