= Jessica Harcourt =

Australian actress (1905–1988)

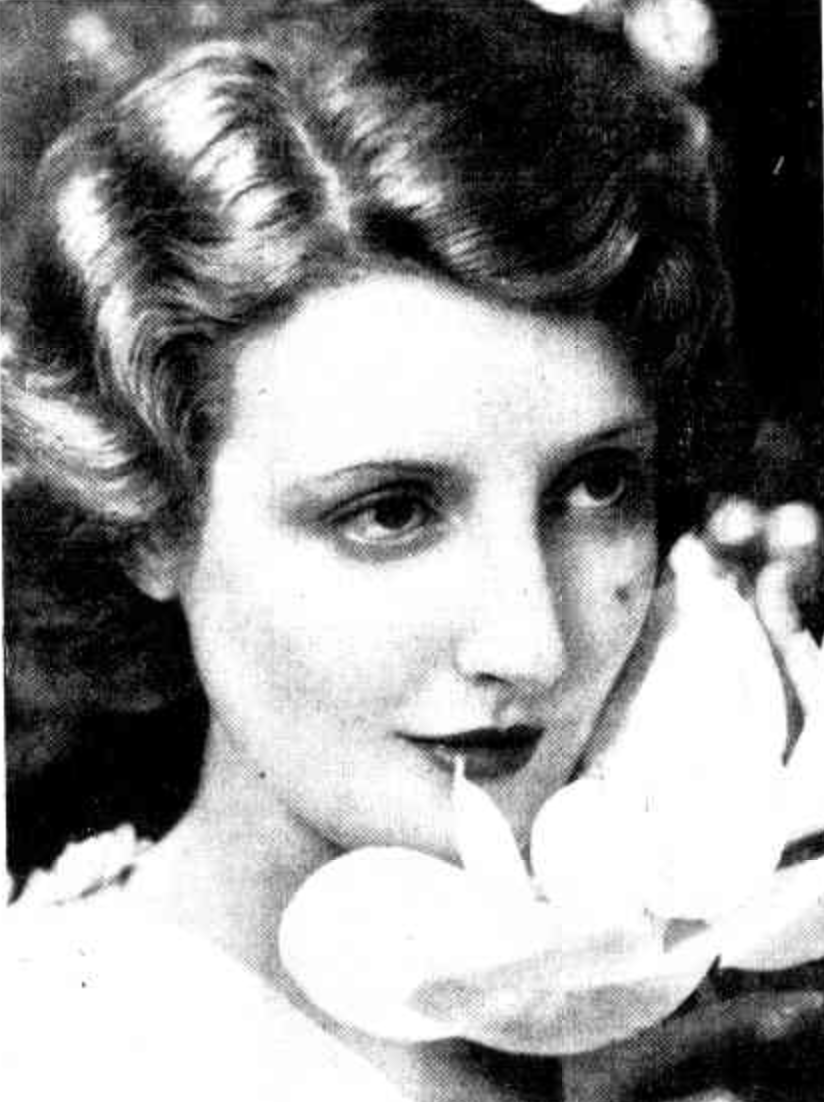
- "The Maid and the Magnolia", Harcourt in 1937
- Born: Jessica Edna Harcourt; 7 April 1905; Woollahra, Sydney, Australia.
- Died: 23 August 1988 (aged 83); Ipswich, Queensland, Australia
- Occupations: Mannequin, author, actress
- Spouse: F. J. Thwaites (m. 1938; died 1979)

Jessica Harcourt (1905–1988) was an Australian mannequin, author and actress, best known for playing a leading role in For the Term of His Natural Life (1927).

== Biography ==
Jessica Edna Harcourt was born on 7 April 1905 in Woollahra, Sydney. She was the daughter of Aubrey William Harcourt, a mercer, and Ada Hobson. Harcourt believed her family were direct descendants of Ivo d'Harcourt, a companion of William the Conqueror. As a young woman working as a programme seller at Her Majesty's Theatre, Sydney, she first caught the eye of Sir John Longstaff, and then her beauty attracted the attention of George Highland, a producer of J. C. Williamson Ltd. She became a chorus girl, appearing in Whirled into Happiness in 1924. She was quickly dubbed "Australia's loveliest girl". Longstaff described her as “more English than Australian, her lovely coloring and features, combined with character and high intelligence, give her very high rank among the many beautiful women I have seen.” Harcourt recognised the opportunity of advancing her career and undertook to do intensive elocution lessons, saying "I don't care how hard I have to work so long as I amount to something in the end." Harcourt received requests for her photo from international newspapers so they could place her face alongside their own beauties. Harcourt started modelling and not long after arriving in Melbourne, was already working as a mannequin for Buckley and Nunn.

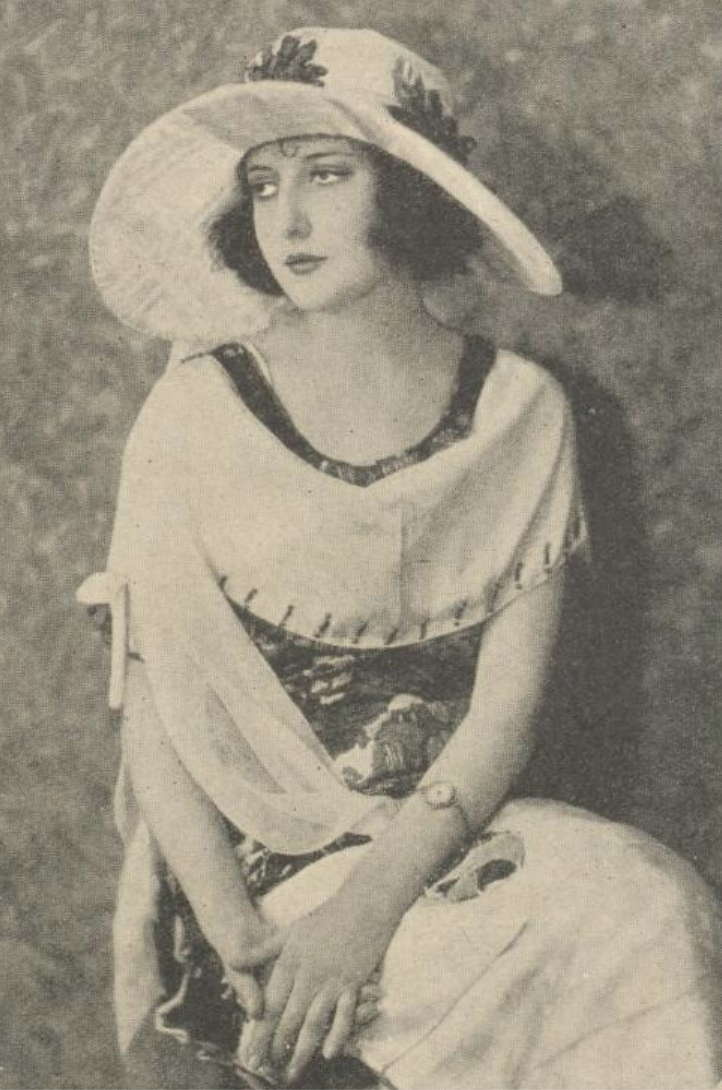
Jessica Harcourt in 1924

Harcourt made her cinema debut as Sara Purfoy in For the Term of His Natural Life. Filming commenced in 1926 and locations included Port Arthur and Launceston, Tasmania and Master Pictures' studio in Bondi, NSW. Of her performance, the director Norman Dawn said Harcourt had "acted capitally" in an emotional scene and "her film prospects were good".

In an interview with the Australian Women's Weekly, Harcourt recalled her surprise at being cast as Sarah Purfoy. She said "...when it was offered to me, I was astounded. I still am! Most of the actresses in Sydney wanted it and there I was, 19, with no acting experience, and I got it!"

Not long after completing filming, Harcourt was off with Norman Dawn to Suva, Fiji to film an adaption of Beatrice Grimshaw's novel Conn of the Coral Seas, a tropical comedy/drama. The filming on location was to include "500 war canoes and outriggers and 2000 native warriors dancing in full war dress with clubs and spears". Filming was to take six weeks and Harcourt made it back to Australia in time for the premiere of her first movie For the Term of His Natural Life. The film was released as The Adorable Outcast and had limited box office success.

In 1928 Harcourt was cast as widow Ruby Russell in the movie The Russell Affair which was filmed in and around Sydney, including Hyde Park and the private homes of socially prominent Sydney families.

== Portraits of Harcourt ==
Longstaff painted several portraits of her, one of which hung in the National Gallery in London. A second portrait was exhibited at the Twenty Melbourne Artists' Exhibition at the Athenaeum Hall in 1925 and purchased by the Felton Bequest for the National Gallery of Victoria for 250 guineas. A miniature portrait of Harcourt, painted in watercolour on ivory by Melbourne miniaturist Ada Whiting, was selected as a finalist in the 1925 Archibald Prize. The miniature hung alongside a similar Whiting miniature of her younger sister, Rene Harcourt, who was regarded as one of the it girls of the day and who had also appeared with her sister in the stage production of Wildflower. Whiting's portrait of Harcourt subsequently hung in the Paris Salon in 1934 and is now in the collection of the National Gallery of Victoria. Another portrait of Harcourt by Mrs E.M. Robb was exhibited at the 1932 Paris Salon and Ernest Buckmaster's portrait of Harcourt was a finalist in the 1936 Archibald Prize. Monte Luke, a well-known photographer of the Strand Arcade, Sydney won a silver plaque at a photographic competition in London in 1925 with one of his many photographic portraits of Harcourt.

== Later years ==
During the 1930s, Harcourt was under contract to J. C. Williamson's, and touring Australia as a mannequin. She produced a number of fashion shows, wrote newspaper articles, and had a short story entitled "The Mystery Submarine" published in The Home magazine. Harcourt created a range of beauty products called "Jessica Harcourt Beauty Preparations" scented with orange blossom and presented in Wedgewood blue and white containers. In 1938 she married the Australian author F. J. "Fred" Thwaites at St John's Church, Toorak and retired from acting. She said that Thwaites did not approve of her acting, "so she devoted the rest of her time to typing manuscripts". They had two children and remained married until his death in 1979.

In 1981 she appeared at the Sydney Film Festival for the premiere of the restoration of For the Term of His Natural Life.

== Theatre credits ==
- Whirled into Happiness, 1924, His Majesty's Theatre, Melbourne
- A Night Out, 1924
- Wildflower, 1925. His Majesty's Theatre, Melbourne
- The Vagabond King, 1928
- Hello Paris, 1930
- Rio Rita, 1930

== Film credits ==
Harcourt was regarded as a "silent screen star" as she only ever appeared in silent movies.

- For the Term of His Natural Life (1927)
- The Adorable Outcast (1928)
- The Russell Affair (1929)
