= Robert Dudley Adams =

Australian businessman and author

Robert Dudley Sidney Powys Adams, born Robert Dudley Sidney Powys Herbert (9 July 1829 – 5 April 1912), was a businessman, journalist author and littérateur in colonial Australia.

== Early life and family ==
Adams was born aboard the Rotterdam packet, in which his mother was travelling to England. He was for a time private secretary to the Hon. Sidney Herbert, the popular War Minister. He had a short career in the Royal Navy, and studied law for a time.

== Career in Australia ==
Adams arrived in New South Wales on 21 September 1851, changing his surname from Herbert to Adams on arrival. He engaged in commercial and pastoral pursuits. In the interval, between 1860 and 1880, he wrote a series of articles on "Australian Finance and Resource" for the English press and magazines, also for the colonial press, numerous political sketches, reviews, and essays, also two poems, the "Psalm of Time" and "Song of the Stars" (the latter subject suggested to him by the late Prince Albert). He also worked as a journalist for the Empire and The Sydney Morning Herald. He was a member of all the New South Wales Exhibition Commissions (except one), including that for Chicago.

== Death ==
His death notice reads:

ADAMS.-Robert Dudley Sidney Powys Adams, beloved husband of the late Comtesse de Vilme-Hautemont, at his residence, "Fernlee," Balmain, on April 5, in his 83rd year
