= The Redemption (novel) =

Book by F.J. Thwaites

- Early Australian edition
- Author: F. J. Thwaites
- Language: English
- Genre: romance
- Publisher: F. J. Thwaites
- Publication date: 1936
- Publication place: Australia

The Redemption is a 1936 novel by F. J. Thwaites. It was his ninth novel.

== Plot ==
Terry Gordon, second officer on a mail steamer, loses his job due to the influence of a beautiful girl. He hits rock bottom but finds redemption through the help of another woman.

== Reception ==
According to one critic:

Speed is not impairing the work of this young Australian author, neither is he skimping words in order to get each book finished. This one has more than 300 pages, and in spite of a rather obvious ending holds the interest all the way. 'The Redemption' has many passages reminiscent of 'Broken Wings' and 'The Mad Doctor,' and the general theme, too, is not original. But the setting is different and the treatment more mature, showing a keener understanding of human beings.

In 1937 the novel was reprinted in the United Kingdom.
