= Beatrice Grimshaw =

Irish writer (1870–1953)

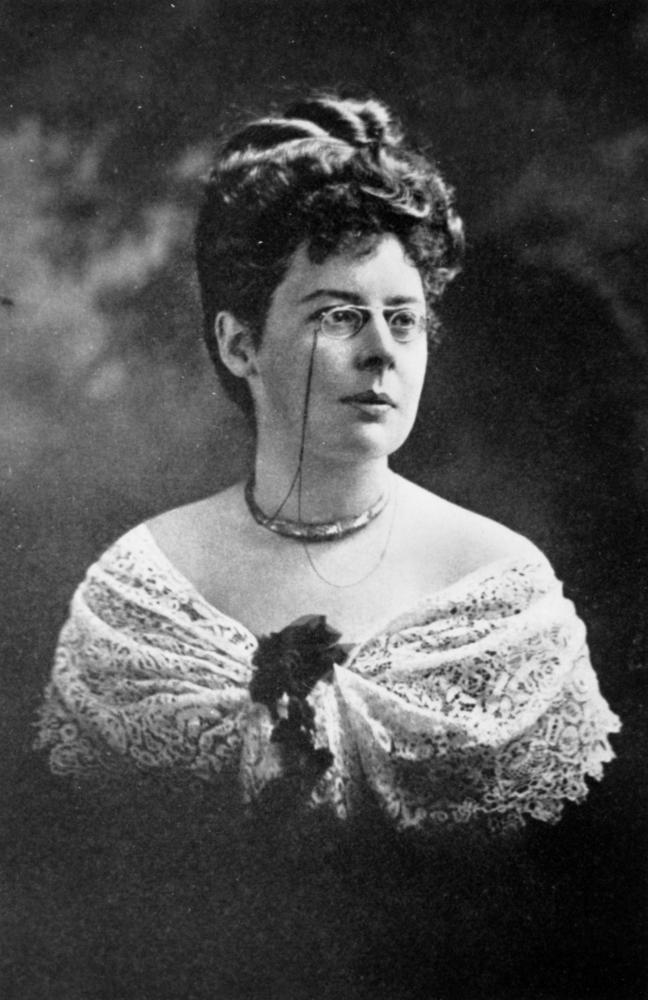
- Grimshaw in 1907
- Born: 3 February 1870; Dunmurry, County Antrim, Ireland
- Died: 30 June 1953 (aged 83); Kelso, New South Wales, Australia
- Occupations: Travel writer; novelist; journalist
- Writing career
- Period: 1897–1945

Beatrice Ethel Grimshaw (3 February 1870 – 30 June 1953) was an Irish writer and traveller. Beginning in 1903, she worked as a travel writer for the Daily Graphic and The Times, leading her to move to the Territory of Papua, where she served as the informal publicist of Lieutenant Governor Hubert Murray. Prior to her travels, she was the editor of the Social Review, publishing many of her own works under a pen name, and she had worked as a sports journalist for the Irish Cyclist. Over the course of her life, she wrote several novels, travel books, and short stories.

== Life ==
Grimshaw was born in Cloona House in Dunmurry, County Antrim, Ireland into a well-to-do family. Her parents were Nicholas William Grimshaw of Belfast, a wine-and-oil merchant, and Eleanor Grimshaw (née Newsam) of Cork. She was the fourth of six children.

Grimshaw was educated privately, first at Victoria College, Belfast, at the Pension Rétaillaud in Caen, France, then Bedford College, London and Queen's College, Belfast but never took a degree. though it was later claimed she had been a lecturer in Classics at Bedford Women's College. Her family were members of the Church of Ireland, but she converted to Catholicism after leaving home.

Grimshaw defied her parents' expectations to marry or become a teacher, instead working for various shipping companies including as a publicist for the Cunard Line. She was an outdoor enthusiast and had a keen interest in bicycling, undertaking long cycle rides culminating in a record 338 km ride in a 24-hour marathon. In 1891, Grimshaw began her writing career when she became a sports journalist for Richard J. Mecredy's Irish Cyclist magazine, later becoming a sub-editor. She then took over the magazine's sister publication, the Social Review, which she edited until 1903, publishing a range of content including poems, dialogues, short stories, and two serialised novels under a pen name.

Grimshaw had long harboured a desire to travel the world, especially the largely unexplored - for Europeans - Pacific Ocean, and in 1903 she was engaged by the Daily Graphic to report on the Pacific. She was commissioned to write travelogues for shipping companies to promote the Cook Islands, Fiji, Niue, Samoa, and Tonga. After a brief trip to Ireland and England, Grimshaw sailed to Papua on a commission from The Times and the Sydney Morning Herald, intending to stay a few months but remained for twenty-seven years, much of the time at Rona Falls. She became a close friend of Lieutenant-Governor Sir Hubert Murray and his unofficial publicist. The Australian government commissioned her to write a pamphlet, The New New Guinea to promote the country to new settlers. Grimshaw had a keen sense for adventure and joined exploration parties into the jungle and up the Sepik and Fly Rivers, and, in 1933, she established a tobacco plantation with her brother Ramsay. After a period of illness, she moved to Kelso, New South Wales in 1936 with her brothers Ramsay and Osborne.

Grimshaw was a prolific writer and her works were published in various newspapers and magazines. Her books often ran in multiple editions and become bestsellers in Australia, the United States, and England. Her first novel, Broken Away, published in 1897, was described as a 'New Women' novel, a feminist ideal Grimshaw identified with. In 1907, she published two non-fiction books detailing her experiences, From Fiji to the Cannibal Islands and In the Strange South Seas, illustrated with her own photographs. In the same year, she also published Vaiti of the islands, a fictionalised account of a young adventurous travelling woman. This adventure and romance novel is typical for Grimshaw's later writing featuring the unique landscape of the South Pacific islands. Grimshaw also explored other genres such as crime fiction with works including Murder in Paradise and The Missing Blondes, and supernatural themes such as witch doctors The Sorcerer's Stone and ghosts in several of her short stories.

Grimshaw's writing has been the subject of some academic study, mostly about the exotic view of her life and topics. Well received at the time of publication, her works have been criticised for their paternalistic and racist overtones. There has also been a study of her writing technique, particularly with proverbs, focusing on The Sorcerer's Stone.

== Filmography ==
- The Adorable Outcast (1928) was based on her 1922 novel Conn of the Coral Seas

== Publications ==
=== Fiction ===
- Broken Away (1897)
- Vaiti of the Islands (1907)
- When the Red Gods Call (Mills & Boon, 1911)
- Guinea Gold (1912)
- The Sorcerer's Stone (Hodder & Stoughton, London, 1914) Online access
- Coral Queen (1919)
- White Savage Simon (1919)
- Queen Vaiti (New South Wales Bookstall Co. Ltd., 1920)
- The Terrible Island (1920)
- The Little Red Speck and Other South Sea Short Stories (Hurst and Blackett, London, 1921)
- The Land of Never-Come-Back and Other Stories (Hurst and Blackett, London, 1923)
- The Sands of Oro (1923)
- Nobody's Island (1923)
- Conn of the Coral Seas (Hurst and Blackett, Ltd., Melbourne, 1922)
- The Candles of Katara (1925)
- Eyes in the Corner and Other Stories (Hurst and Blackett, London, 1927)
- The Paradise Poachers (1928)
- The Beach of Terror and Other Stories (Cassell & Co, London, 1931)
- Pieces of Gold and Other South Sea Stories (Cassell & Co, London, 1935)
- South Sea Sarah; Murder in Paradise: Two Complete Novels (New Century Press, Sydney, 1940)
- Murder In Paradise (1941)
- The Missing Blondes (1945)

=== Non-fiction ===
- From Fiji to the Cannibal Islands (1907)
- In the Strange South Seas (1907)
- The New New Guinea (1910) Online access
- Isles of Adventure (1930)
