= Wind in the Bracken =

Book by F.J. Thwaites

- Author: F. J. Thwaites
- Language: English
- Publication date: 1941
- Publication place: Australia

Wind in the Bracken is a novel by F. J. Thwaites.

The story was adapted for radio in 1945 and 1954.
