= Broken Wings (Thwaites novel) =

Book by F.J. Thwaites

- Author: F. J. Thwaites
- Language: English
- Publisher: Jackson & O'Sullivan
- Publication date: 1934
- Publication place: Australia

Broken Wings is a 1934 novel by F. J. Thwaites.

The novel was adapted for the radio.

== Plot ==
The novel is set in Australia's sheep country. Ron Burrell, the last son of a respected pioneer family, falls foul of a powerful financier and suffers many vicissitudes before regaining his place in society.
