= Shadows Over Rangoon =

Book by F.J. Thwaites

- Author: F. J. Thwaites
- Language: English
- Publisher: F. J. Thwaites
- Publication date: 1941
- Publication place: Australia

Shadows Over Rangoon is a 1941 Australian novel by F. J. Thwaites.

The novel was serialised on Australian radio starting late 1941 and going into 1942.

== Premise ==
"It tells of a strange meeting during an air-raid, and of the few chance words responsible for sending Doctor John Courtney from all he once cherished to the oblivion of sun-drenched Rangoon. We read of a terrible misunderstanding that makes of a once proud woman an out- cast, and of the richly merited fate that overtakes Cedrick Gleeson, blackmailer and cheat; we meet eccentric but glamorous Delysia Rayner, rich and powerful, yet standing in the shadow of death; we see a great romance blossom amid the tropical loveliness of a Burmese valley."
