= The Broken Melody (novel) =

Australian novel by F. J. Thwaites

- Title page for The Broken Melody (1946 edition)
- Author: F. J. Thwaites
- Language: English
- Genre: Novel
- Publisher: Publicity Press
- Publication date: 1930
- Publication place: Australia
- Followed by: The Melody Lingers

The Broken Melody is a 1930 melodramatic Australian novel by F. J. Thwaites. It was Thwaites' debut novel and became a best seller, launching his career. It was turned into a 1938 Australian film and led to a sequel The Melody Lingers.

== Plot ==
The novel was about Ted Jenkins, a farmer's son, is kicked out of boarding school for addiction to dope; when his father finds out, he kicks Ted off their property as well. Ted moves to Sydney and becomes homeless; he thinks about killing himself when he sees a young woman, Carmol, thinking of killing herself, too. They decide not to do it and Carmol nurses Ted back to health. The two form a strong bond (though not a romantic one – Ted's love is for Nibs, the daughter of Ted's father's best friend).

Ted changes his name to "Digby Judd" and gets a job playing cello in Kings Cross, then moves to Thursday Island to improve his health, eventually running a pearling business for three years.

While on Thursday Island, Ted/Digby runs into Fay le Bretton, a world class pianist on holiday, who discovers his talent for the cello and persuades him to come to London. The night before Ted's London debut he finds out that Carmol has been killed in a hit and run accident, but he still performs and is a big success.

Four years later, Ted returns to Australia a rich man; he buys his family property (on the market due to a drought) and is reunited with his dying father and Nibs.

== Background ==
Thwaites started writing the novel when he was seventeen, without having even written a short story beforehand.

He later claimed his motivation was to perpetuate the memory of his grandfather, Francis Jenkins, who settled on "Buckingbong" Station in 1827. Thwaites' grandmother, Mrs. Lydia Jenkins, was born in 1839, and was claimed to have been the first white child born in the south-western portion of New South Wales. "It was my object to write a book around the Jenkins' family so that the name of Jenkins would live again", said Thwaites.

However Thwaites could not get anyone to publish it, so he decided to do it himself. "Then the problems started", he later recalled. "I travelled from Sydney to Townsville interviewing every librarian, bookseller and newsagent on the way and returned without selling one copy. I was about to give the game away but decided to try the Riverina first."

He arrived in Wagga Wagga and introduced himself to the editor as the great-grandson of a local property owner. The paper ran a story of him and the publicity enabled him to sell his book.

== Reception ==
Critical reception was not strong. One critic wrote that the book "betrays the prentice hand, for Mr. Thwaites does not yet know men and women, nor does he understand life. Neither fortunes nor girls are won as easily as he Imagines. But be has enterprise, and his novel has Interest."

The book became a best seller. By 1935 it was estimated to have sold 55,000 copies in Australia and 25,000 in England. Thwaites wrote a sequel, The Melody Lingers (1935). By 1968 it had been reprinted 54 times and was estimated to have sold over a million copies.

== Film version ==
In 1933 it was announced that Thwaites was travelling to Hollywood to sell the book to the movies. He was no fan of the Australian film industry at this time; according to a 1933 interview:

He deplored the presentation abroad of such films as On Our Selection, Harmony Row, The Sentimental Bloke and The Squatter's Daughter, in all of which there was at least one imbecile or half-wit. People abroad viewing these pictures could not be blamed for coming to the conclusion that about one person in every four or five in Australia was sub normal. The Efftee Studios in Australia were deserving of praise for their pioneering work, but surely it was possible to portray humour on the screen without associating it with lunacy.

Ironically, The Broken Melody was later turned into a film by Ken G. Hall, who also directed On Our Selection and The Squatter's Daughter.
