= Where Gods Are Vain =

Book by F.J. Thwaites

- Author: F. J. Thwaites
- Language: English
- Publisher: Jackson & O'Sullivan
- Publication date: 1934
- Publication place: Australia

Where Gods Are Vain is a novel by F. J. Thwaites.

The novel was adapted for the radio.

== Plot ==
Derry Dexter, an Australian originally engaged in the copra trade on the Cocos Islands, becomes a world-famous sculptor.
