= Flames of Convention =

Book by F.J. Thwaites

- Author: F. J. Thwaites
- Language: English
- Publisher: Jackson & O'Sullivan
- Publication date: 1933
- Publication place: Australia

Flames of Convention was the third novel by F. J. Thwaites.

The novel was adapted for the radio.

== Plot ==
An artist, Brett Hardy, and his beloved, a squatter's daughter, defy convention to live their lives their own way and suffer for it. The novel is set in Sydney and rural New South Wales.

== Plagiarism accusations ==
Eighteen months after publication, it was alleged that a section of Chapter Fifteen the book closely resembled the opening chapter of Susan Lennox: Her Fall and Rise (1912) by David Phillips.

== Adaptation ==
In 1935 it was announced the book would be filmed in England but this did not happen.
