= The Adorable Outcast =

1928 film directed by Norman Dawn

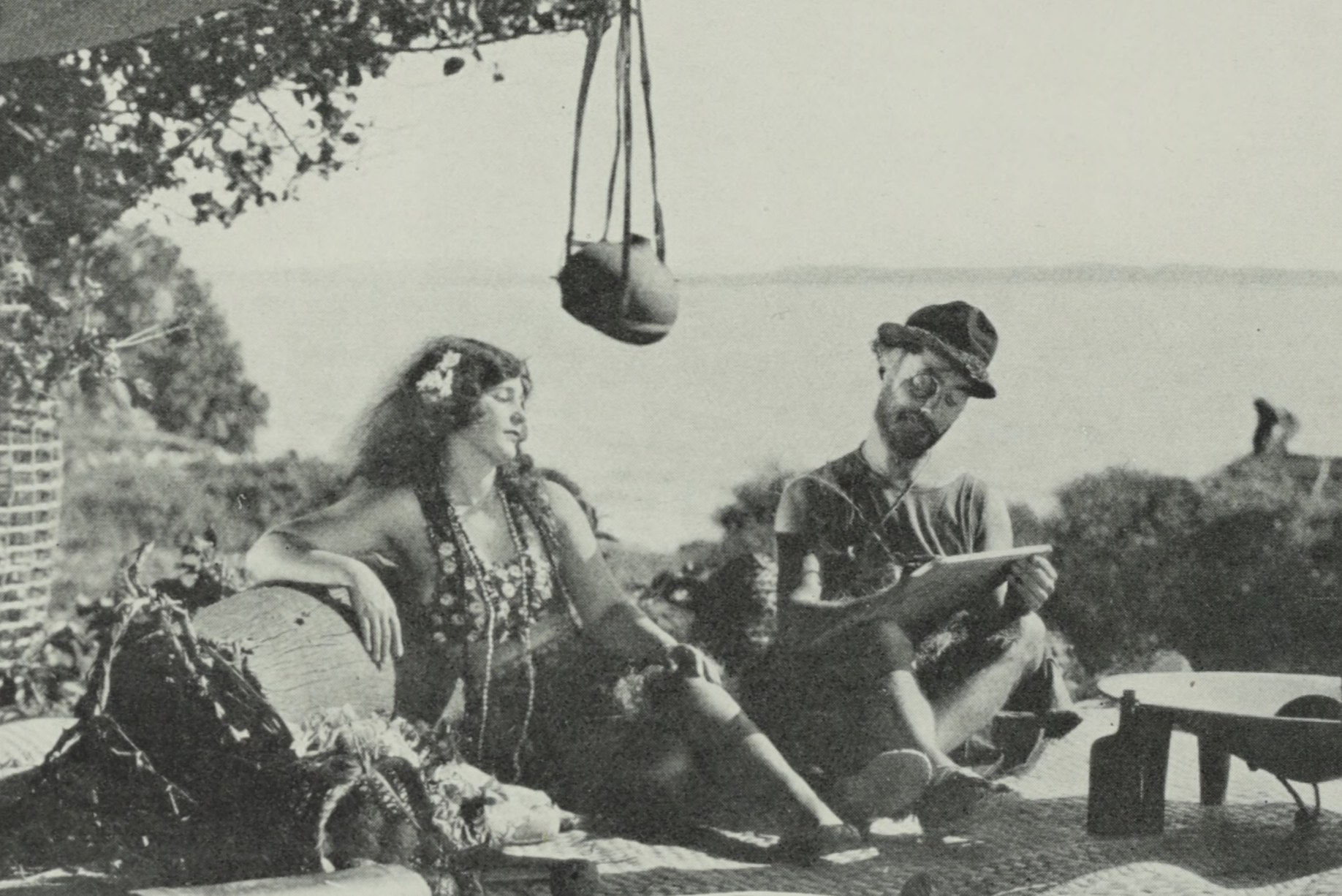
- Edith Roberts and Compton Coutts in a scene
- Directed by: Norman Dawn
- Written by: Norman Dawn
- Based on: Conn of the Coral Seas by Beatrice Grimshaw
- Produced by: Norman Dawn
- Starring: Edith Roberts; Edmund Burns; Walter Long
- Cinematography: Arthur Higgins; William Trerise
- Edited by: Mona Donaldson
- Production companies: Australasian Films; A Union Master World Picture
- Release date: 25 June 1928
- Running time: 7,300 feet
- Country: Australia
- Language: Silent (English intertitles)
- Budget: £40,000

The Adorable Outcast is a 1928 Australian silent film directed by Norman Dawn about an adventurer who romances an island girl. The script was based on Beatrice Grimshaw's novel Conn of the Coral Seas. It was one of the most expensive films made in Australia until that time, and was Dawn's follow up to For the Term of His Natural Life (1927). It did not perform as well at the box office and helped cause Australasian Films to abandon feature film production.

For the American market and with sound added, the film was retitled Black Cargoes of the South Seas.

== Synopsis ==
A young adventurer, Stephen Conn (Edmund Burns) is in love with an island girl, Luya (Edith Roberts). An evil blackbirder Fursey (Walter Long) kidnaps Luya to get hands on some gold, but Stephen rescues her with the help of Luya's tribe.

When it is revealed that Luya's parents were white, she and Stephen are married.

== Cast ==
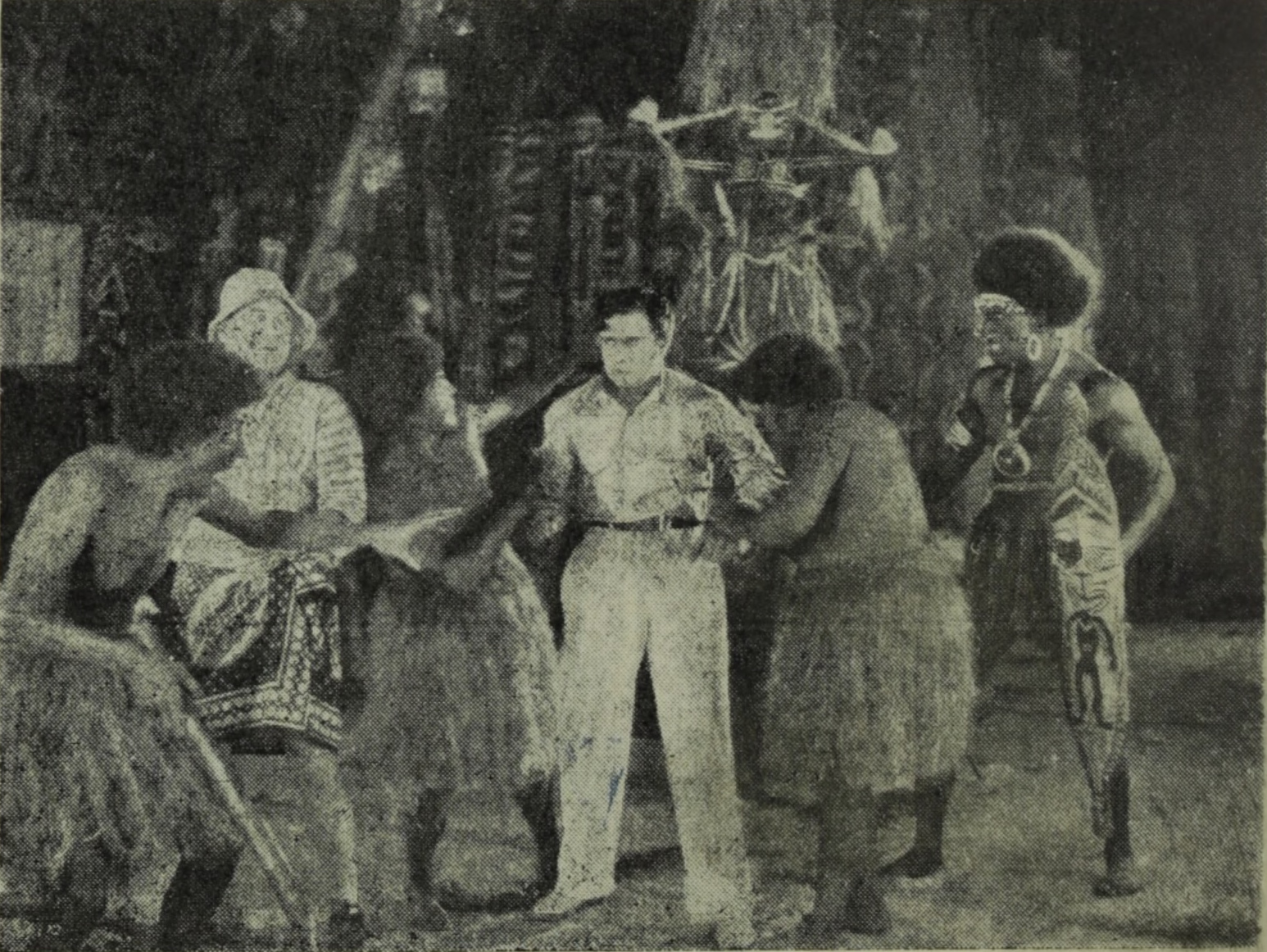
Production still featuring Walter Long, Edmund Burns, and Arthur McLaglen

- Edith Roberts as Luya
- Edmund Burns as Stephen Conn
- Walter Long as Fursey
- Jessica Harcourt as Diedre Rose
- John Gavin as Carberry
- Katherine Dawn as Elizabeth
- Arthur McLaglen as Iron Devil
- Arthur Tauchert as Mack
- Fred Twitcham as Sir John Blackberry
- Compton Coutts as Pooch
- William O'Hanlon as pearler
- Claude Turton as pearler

== Production ==
The big-budget film was shot mostly on location in Fiji from April to June 1927, with some studio work done at Bondi Junction in Sydney. The three leads, Edith Roberts, Edmund Burns and Walter Long, were all established Hollywood actors. The ambitious filming schedule involved "500 war canoes and outriggers, and 2000 native warriors dancing in full war dress with clubs and spears".

== Reception ==
The film initially performed strongly at the box office but soon tailed off, and expected overseas success did not eventuate. It was estimated the combined losses of this and Norman Dawn's earlier film, For the Term of His Natural Life (1927) came to £30,000.

It was released in the US as Black Cargoes of the South Seas, with sound added.

Fifteen minutes of the film are in the possession of the National Film & Sound Archive.
