= Prelude to Christopher =

1934 novel by Eleanor Dark

- Author: Eleanor Dark
- Language: English
- Genre: novel
- Publisher: P. R. Stephensen, Australia
- Publication date: 1934
- Publication place: Australia
- Media type: Print
- Pages: 317
- Preceded by: Slow Dawning
- Followed by: Return to Coolami

Prelude to Christopher is a 1934 novel by Eleanor Dark (1901–1985). It was awarded the ALS Gold Medal in 1934.

== Plot summary ==
The storyline is nonlinear and of interest to those interested in the establishment of modernism in the arts in Australia. The story centers on a Eugenicist experiment gone awry on a remote island. The repercussions of the incident play out in a young woman's decision whether to have a child. A recurring symbol in the book is a painting of the island with the doomed eugenicist's experiment.

== Reviews and analysis ==
A reviewer in The Sydney Morning Herald noted that "It stands apart from the ordinary run of Australian fiction because of the author's mastery over her material, and her capacity for making every phrase tell...Not many Australian writers have exhibited such technical efficiency in a first novel."

After the book's re-issue by Halstead Press in 2011, Anne Maxwell, of the University of Melbourne, found that "Arguably, part of the emotive power of Prelude to Christopher stems from the fact that it contains autobiographical elements; indeed, some critics maintain that it was based on a dark family secret." Maxwell notes that Dark's mother committed suicide and that her father was a sexual predator and tyrant. She continued: "Underlining the extent of Dark’s investment in the finer emotions, especially the human capacity for compassion and empathy and the ability to hit back at the ideal of rational efficiency, is the novel’s non-realist style."

Diana Wyndham, the author of a history of the eugenics movement in Australia, has suggested that the portion of Prelude to Christopher in which "the central characters agonised about eugenics and hereditary madness" may have been influenced by the views of Dark's aunt Marion Louisa Piddington, a prominent eugenicist.
