= Mal Morgan =

Australian poet

Mal Morgan (3 September 1935 – 16 November 1999) was an Australian poet, prominent in the Melbourne poetry scene from the 1970s through to his death.

Of Polish/Jewish heritage, Morgan was born in London, England. He emigrated to Australia in 1948 at the age of twelve and graduated in pharmacy in 1959.

Morgan began writing poetry in the late 1960s. He convened the La Mama poetry readings at La Mama Theatre in Carlton from 1985 to 1991 and directed the Montsalvat National Poetry and Song Festival from 1991 to 1993. An enthusiastic advocate of other poets, Morgan reviewed poetry and was a prominent and well-loved figure in the Melbourne poetry scene. Morgan died of cancer in Melbourne in 1999.

== Publications ==
- Poemsstones (1976)
- Statues Don't Bleed (1984)
- A Handshake with the Moon (1987)
- Once Father and God (1992)
- Throwaway Moon (New and Selected Poems) (1995)
- Beautiful Veins (1999)
