= Winifred Lewellin James =

Australian writer (1876–1941)

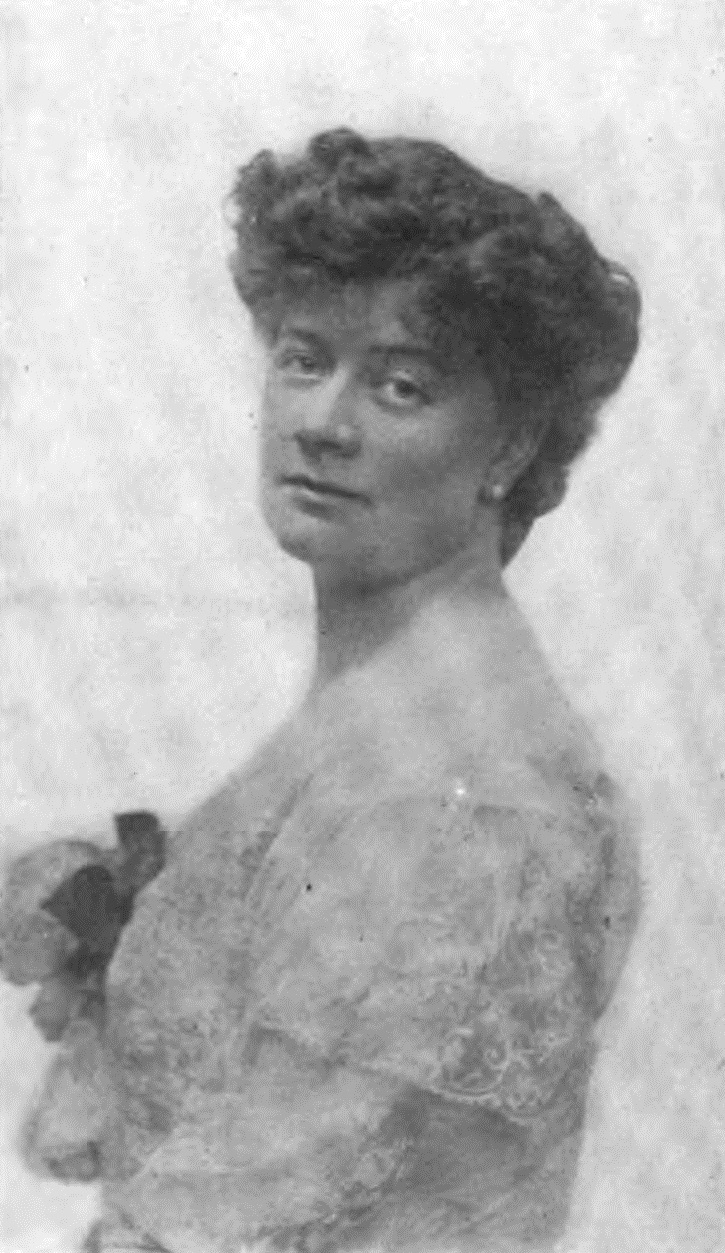
- Born: 20 March 1876; Prahran, Victoria, Australia
- Died: 27 April 1941 (aged 65); Sydney, New South Wales, Australia
- Occupations: Novelist, travel writer and journalist

Winifred Lewellin James (20 March 1876 – 27 April 1941) was an Australian writer. Born in Melbourne in 1876, she became a journalist and writer of short stories for The Australasian in her twenties. She moved to London in 1905 and established herself as a travel writer and novelist. After she divorced her American husband in 1927, authorities realised that she had ceased to be a British subject on her marriage, and she was required to register as an alien. She became an activist for the legal protection of women who married non-British husbands, and was eventually naturalised in 1935. James returned to Australia in 1939, where she published her final novel, and died in Sydney in 1941.

== Biography ==
Winifred Llewellyn James was born in the Melbourne suburb of Prahran on 20 March 1876. Her parents were the Methodist clergyman Thomas James and his wife Gertrude (née Peterson). She attended an independent school in St Kilda. In 1901 James moved to Adelaide and began operating a teashop. She returned to Melbourne two years later, where she became a journalist and a writer of short stories for the local newspaper The Australasian.

After establishing herself as a writer, James moved to London in 1905. She published a series of popular works over the following years, including the novels Bachelor Betty (1907), Patricia Baring (1908), and Saturday's Children (1909). In 1910 she published her most successful work, Letters to my Son. By 1920 Letters to my Son had reached its eighteenth edition and had been followed by a sequel titled More Letters to My Son. In 1911 and 1912 she published an additional novel, a travel book about her visit to the West Indies and Panama, and two collections of letters.

On 30 April 1913, James married the American merchant Henry de Jan in London. She moved to Panama where her husband was based and published a book about her relocation. After returning to London in the early 1920s, she began to manage an antique shop and became a contributor to newspapers. She also published additional novels and travel books.

After a legal dispute, James and her husband divorced in Panama in 1927. Under UK law at the time, she lost her British nationality on marrying de Jan in 1913. As her divorce did not restore her British nationality, she was required to register as an alien. Each time she travelled more than 5 miles (8.0 km) from her home, she was also required to visit a police station to report her movements. She eventually refused to do so, risking a fine and up to six months' imprisonment, and became an activist for changing the law to protect the citizenship of women who had married non-British husbands. After a court battle and public demonstrations in support of her case, she was naturalised in 1935. According to an obituary published in The Sydney Morning Herald, she achieved "worldwide notoriety" for her activism.

James returned to Australia in 1939. She published her final novel, The Gods Arrive, in 1941, and continued working on her unfinished autobiography. She died in Newington Hospital, Sydney of cerebral thrombosis on 27 April 1941, and was cremated.

== Writing ==
James wrote both fiction and non-fiction works, including travel books and essays. Many of her works were written in the first person in the form of diaries, letters, and travel narratives. Her writing is described in The Oxford Companion to Edwardian Fiction as being characterised by a "chatty, discursive tone", while Sally O'Neill describes her writing in the Australian Dictionary of Biography as "chatty, familiar, yet never carelessly crafted".

== Selected works ==
=== Novels ===
- Bachelor Betty (1907)
- Patricia Baring (1908)
- Saturday's Children (1910)
- The Gods Arrive (1941)

=== Travel books ===
- The Mulberry Tree (1913)
- A Woman in the Wilderness (1915)
- Out of the Shadows (1924)
- Gangways and Corridors (1936)

== See also ==
- History of British nationality law
