= Alice Guerin Crist =

Australian author and journalist

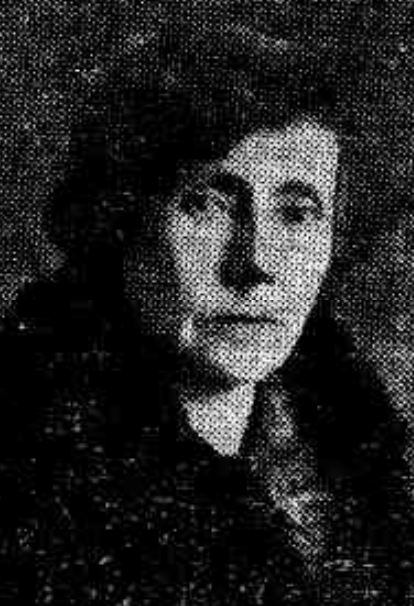
- Alice Guerin Crist c.1927
- Born: Alice Guerin; 6 February 1876; Clare Castle, Ireland
- Died: 13 June 1941 (aged 65); Toowoomba, Queensland
- Occupations: Writer; poet; journalist
- Spouse: Joseph Crist (m. 1902)

Alice Guerin Crist (1876–1941) was an Australian poet, author and journalist.

== Early life ==
Crist was born in Clare Castle, Ireland on 6 February 1876 to Patrick and Winifred (née Rohan or Rouhan) Guerin. When she was two years old, the family migrated to Queensland, where her father taught in rural schools, including as head teacher of Tent Hill Upper school in May 1880.

== Career ==
Crist's writing career began before she reached her teens. Her first short story was published in Brisbane newspaper, The Queenslander, in December 1887, two months before her 12th birthday. She wrote "Elsie In Fairyland" 12 months later for the "Christmas Supplement" of The Queenslander, published on 22 December 1888. In November the following year, she wrote "The Three Sisters", which was serialised across two issues of the same paper.

From 1927 Crist received payment for her contributions to the Brisbane-based Catholic Advocate.

In 1929, a journalist wrote in the Adelaide Southern Cross that "Mrs Crist has already gained a reputation in Queensland akin to that of "John O'Brien", for her poems depicting Irish-Australian life in the bush".

Crist was awarded the King George V's jubilee medal in 1935 and King George VI's coronation medal in 1937. A wing of the Holy Spirit Hospital in Brisbane was named in her honour in 1953.

== Works ==
=== Poetry ===
- When Rody Came to Ironbark: And other verses, Cornstalk, Sydney, 1927
- Eucharist Lilies: And other verses, Pellegrini, 1928

=== Children's fiction ===
- Children: Go it! Brothers!, Pellegrini & Co., 1929

== Personal ==
Crist married Joseph Christ in Queensland on 4 October 1902. He changed his surname to Crist by deed poll in 1913.

Crist died of tuberculosis on 13 June 1941 in hospital in Toowoomba, Queensland. Her husband, three daughters and two sons all survived her.
