= Alan Villiers =

Australian author, adventurer, photographer & mariner (1903–1982)

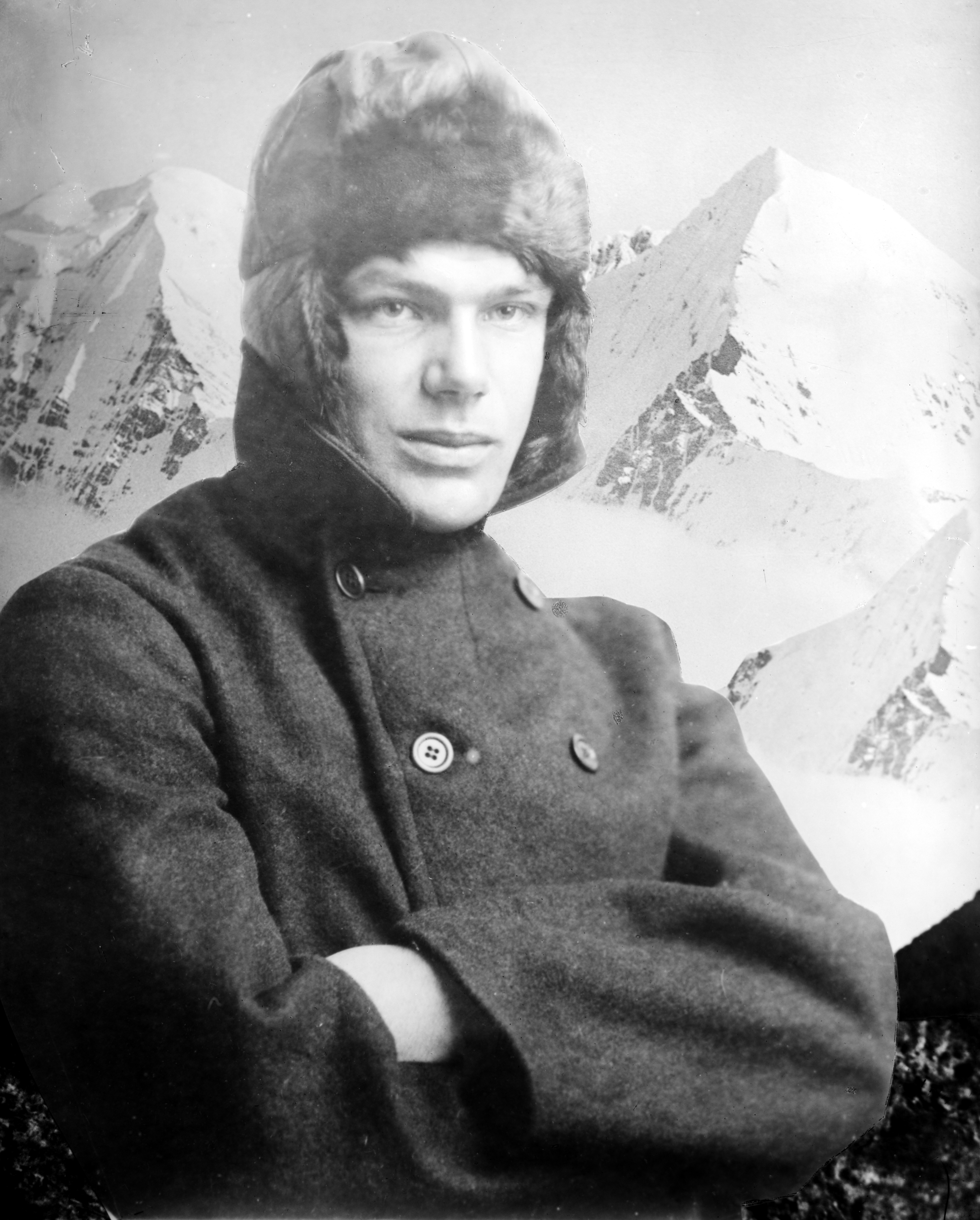
- Portrait of Alan Villiers in 1925
- Born: Alan John Villiers; 23 September 1903; Melbourne, Victoria, Australia
- Died: 3 March 1982 (aged 78); Oxford, Oxfordshire, England
- Citizenship: Australian / British
- Occupations: sailor, journalist, author
- Writing career
- Language: English
- Years active: 1928-1965
- Notable work: Whalers of the Midnight Sun
- Notable awards: Children's Book of the Year Award: Older Readers 1950

Alan John Villiers, DSC (23 September 1903 – 3 March 1982) was a writer, adventurer, photographer and mariner.

Born in Melbourne, Australia, Villiers first went to sea at age 15 and sailed on board traditionally rigged vessels, including the full-rigged ship Joseph Conrad. He commanded square-rigged ships for films, including Moby Dick and Billy Budd. He also commanded the Mayflower II on its voyage from the United Kingdom to the United States.

Villiers wrote 44 books, and served as the Chairman (1960–70) and President (1970-74) of the Society for Nautical Research, a Trustee of the National Maritime Museum, and Governor of the Cutty Sark Preservation Society. He was awarded the British Distinguished Service Cross as a Commander in the Royal Naval Reserve during the Second World War.

== Early history ==
Alan John Villiers was the second son of Australian poet and union leader Leon Joseph Villiers. The young Villiers grew up on the docks watching the merchant ships come in and out of the Port of Melbourne. Leaving home at the age of 15, he joined the barque Rothesay Bay as an apprentice. The Rothesay Bay operated in the Tasman Sea, trading between Australia and New Zealand.

An accident on board the barque Lawhill beached Villiers in 1922, by then a seasoned Able seaman. He sought employment as a journalist at the Hobart Mercury newspaper in Tasmania while he recovered from his wounds.

== Writer and adventurer ==
Soon Villiers was back at sea when the great explorer and whaler Carl Anton Larsen and his whaling factory ship, the Sir James Clark Ross came to port with five whale chasers in tow in late 1923. His accounts of the trip were published as Whaling in the Frozen South. Named for the Antarctica explorer James Clark Ross, the Ross was the largest whale factory ship in the world, weighing in at 12,000 tons. She was headed for the southern Ross Sea, the last whale stronghold left. Villiers writes: "We had caught 228, most of them blues, the biggest over 100 feet long. These yielded 17,000 barrels of oil; we had hoped for at least 40,000, with luck 60,000."

Villiers' passage on board the Herzogin Cecilie in 1927 would result in his publication of Falmouth for Orders. Through it he met Captain Ruben de Cloux, who later became his partner in the barque Parma.

He wrote By Way of Cape Horn after his experiences crewing the full-rigged Grace Harwar from Australia to Ireland in 1929. Villiers had a desire to document the great sailing ships before it was too late, and Grace Harwar was one of the last working full-riggers. With a small ill-paid crew and no need for coal, such vessels undercut steam ships, and maybe 20 ships were still involved in the trade. As Villiers first stood on the dock looking at Grace Harwar, a wharf laborer warned "Don't ship out in her! She's a killer." Villiers' friend Ronald Walker was lost on the journey. More than 40 years old at the time, the ship had barnacles and algae growing along her waterline. The voyage took 138 days and was filmed as The Cape Horn Road; Villiers took photographs, serving as a record of that period in full-rigged working ships.

== Ship owner and circumnavigator ==
Villiers reunited with Ruben de Cloux in 1931, becoming a partner with him in the four-masted barque Parma. With de Cloux as captain, Parma won the unofficial "grain race" between the ships of the trade in 1932, arriving in 103 days despite broaching in a gale. In 1933, the ship won in 83 days. Villiers sailed as a passenger on both voyages.

After selling his shares back to de Cloux, Villiers purchased the Georg Stage in 1934. A full-rigged sailing ship of 400 tons, originally built in 1882 by Burmeister & Wain in Copenhagen, Denmark, she was employed as a sailing school ship by Stiftelsen Georg Stages Minde. Saving her from the scrapyard, Villiers renamed her the Joseph Conrad, after the writer and seaman Joseph Conrad.

A sail training pioneer, Villiers circumnavigated the globe with an amateur crew. He used the environment of the sea to build character and discipline in his young crew and, with his contemporaries Irving and Exy Johnson, he helped form the modern concept of sail training.

Returning almost two years later, Villiers sold the Joseph Conrad to George Huntington Hartford. He published two books of his adventures, Cruise of the "Conrad" and Stormalong. The Joseph Conrad is maintained and operated as a museum ship at Mystic Seaport in Connecticut, USA.

In 1938, Alan Villiers embarked as a passenger on an Arab dhow for a round trip from Oman to the Rufiji Delta, and depicted the way of life of Arab sailors and their navigation techniques in a book called Sons of Sindbad, illustrated with his own photographs.

== World War II ==
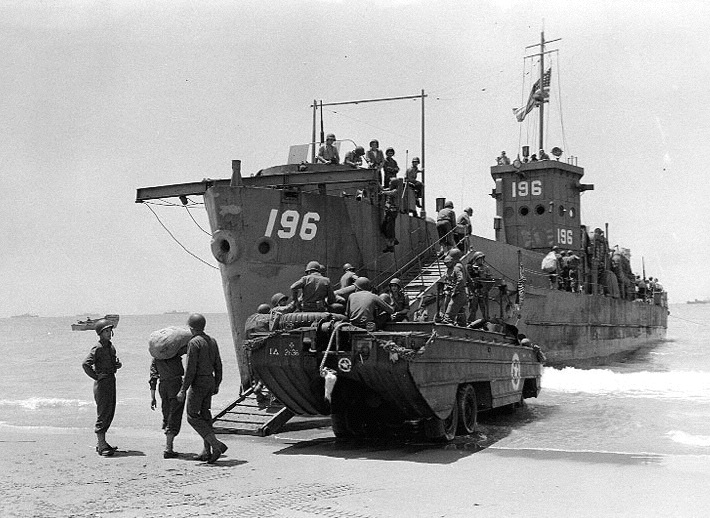
A LCI(L) during the invasion of Sicily - 1943

With the outbreak of World War II, Villiers was commissioned as a lieutenant in the Royal Naval Volunteer Reserve in 1940. He was assigned to a convoy of 24 LCI(L)s, or Landing craft, Infantry (Large). Ordered to deliver them across the Atlantic, with a 40 percent loss rate expected, Villiers got all but one safely across. He commanded "flights" of LCI(L)s on D-Day in the Invasion of Sicily, invasion of Normandy, and the Burma Campaign in the Far East. By the end of the War, Villiers had been promoted temporary acting commander and awarded the British Distinguished Service Cross.

== Later years ==
Married in 1940 to his second wife Nancie, Villiers settled in Oxford, England, and continued to be active in sailing and writing. He was the Captain of the Mayflower II in her 1957 maiden voyage across the Atlantic, 337 years after the original Mayflower, and beating her predecessor's time of 67 days by 13 days. From 1963 to 1967 he was involved in an unsuccessful attempt to build a replica of HM Bark Endeavour. He advised on the 1962 MGM movie Mutiny on the Bounty. Villiers was a regular contributor to the National Geographic Magazine throughout the 1950s and 1960s.

Villiers produced a travel lecture film, Last of the Great Sea Dogs, which ran at the Dorothy Chandler pavilion in 1976. The film contains 16mm colour, filmography of his adventures. There is a digital restored master of the performance with an audio track, narrated by Villiers.

In 1951, the Portuguese Ambassador to the United States, Pedro Teotónio Pereira, a sailing enthusiast and later a friend of Villiers, invited him to sail on the schooner Argus, a cod fishing four-masted schooner, and to record the last commercial activity ever to make use of sails in ocean-crossings. Villiers wrote The Quest Of The Schooner Argus: A voyage to the Grand Banks and Greenland on a modern four masted fishing schooner. The book was a success in North America and Europe and was later published in sixteen languages. The voyage made news on the BBC, in the main London newspapers, the National Geographic Magazine, and the New York Times, and the Portuguese government made Villiers a Commander of the Portuguese Order of St. James of the Sword for outstanding services to literature in March 1951.

In 1978, Villiers weighed in that Francis Drake landed at New Albion at Point Reyes in Marin County, California.

In 2010, the Society for Nautical Research, the Naval Review, and the Britannia Naval Research Association jointly established the annual Alan Villiers Memorial Lecture at St Edmund Hall, Oxford.

== In popular culture ==
Civilization VI includes a quote from Villiers: "There is little man has made that approaches anything in nature, but a sailing ship does."

== Bibliography ==
=== Books ===
- Whaling In The Frozen South (1925 The Bobbs-Merrill co.)
- The Wind Ship (1928 Hurst & Blackett, Ltd.)
- Falmouth for Orders (1929 Henry Holt and Company)
- By way of Cape Horn (1930 Henry Holt and Co); illustrated with photographs taken by Ronald Gregory Walker and the author
- Sea Dogs of Today (1931 Henry Holt & Company)
- Vanished Fleets (1931 Charles Scribner's Sons, ISBN 0-684-14112-4)
- The Sea in Ships (1932 G. Routledge and Sons Ltd.)
- Voyage of the "Parma"; The Great Grain Race of 1932 (1933 G. Bles)
- Grain Race (1933 Charles Scribner's Sons)
- Last of the Wind Ships, with over 200 photographs by the author (1934 William Morrow and Co)
- The Sea in Ships (1932 Routledge)
- Whalers of the Midnight Sun, illustrated by Charles Pont (1935 Charles Schribners Son's)
- Cruise of the Conrad (1937 Charles Scribner's Sons)
- Stormalong (1937 Charles Scribner's Sons)
- Modern Mariners (1937 Garden City)
- The Making of a Sailor (1938 William Morrow and Co)
- Joey Goes To Sea, Illustrated by Victor J. Dowling (1939 Charles Scribner's Sons)
- Sons of Sinbad (1940 Charles Scribner's Sons)
- Whalers of the Midnight Sun, Illustrated with woodcuts by Charles Pont (1947 Charles Scribner's Sons)
- The Set of the Sails; The Story of a Cape Horn Seaman (1949 Hodder and Stoughton)
- The Coral Sea (1949 Museum Press)
- The Quest of the Schooner Argus (1951 Charles Scribner's Sons)
- The Indian Ocean (1952 Museum Press)
- Monsoon Seas (1952 McGraw Hill)
- And Not To Yield; A Story of the Outward Bound School of Adventure, Illustrated by Jean Main and David Cobb (1953 Scribner)
- The Cutty Sark; Last of A Glorious Era, Introduction by the Duke of Edinburgh (1953 Hodder and Stoughton)
- The Way of a Ship (1953 Charles Scribner's Sons)
- Sailing Eagle (1955 Charles Scribner's Sons)
- Pioneers of the Seven Seas (1956 Routledge & Paul)
- Posted Missing (1956 Charles Scribner's Sons, ISBN 0-684-13871-9)
- Wild Ocean (1957 McGraw Hill)
- The New Mayflower (1958 Scribner)
- The Windjammer Story (1958 TAB)
- Give Me a Ship to Sail (1959 Charles Scribner's Sons)
- Of Ships and Men, a Personal Anthology (1962 Newnes)
- The Ocean; Man's Conquest of the Sea (1963 Dutton)
- Oceans of the World; Man's Conquest of the Sea (1963 Museum Press Ltd.)
- Pilot Pete (1963 Angus)
- The Battle of Trafalgar (1965 Macmillan)
- Captain James Cook (1967 Scribner)
- The Deep Sea Fishermen (1970 Hodder and Stoughton)
- The War with Cape Horn (1971 Pan Books Ltd., ISBN 0-330-23697-0)
- My Favourite Sea Stories, Drawings by Mark Myers (1972 Lutterworth Press)
- The Bounty Ships of France, Alan Villiers and Henri Picard (1972 Charles Scribner's Sons, ISBN 0-684-13184-6)
- Men Ships and the Sea, Foreword by Melville Bell Grosvenor (1973 National Geographic Society, ISBN 0-87044-018-7)
- Voyaging With The Wind: An Introduction to Sailing Large Square Rigged Ships (1975 H.M. Stationery Office)

== Articles ==
- Villiers, Alan (October 1955). "The Drive For Speed At Sea". American Heritage. 6 (6).
- Villiers, Alan (Summer 1956–57). "James Cook, Seaman". Quadrant. 1 (1): 7–16.
- Villiers, Alan (August 1962). "Aboard the N.S. Savannah - Worlds First Nuclear Merchantman". National Geographic. 122 (2): 281–298.
