= Emily Coungeau =

Australian poet

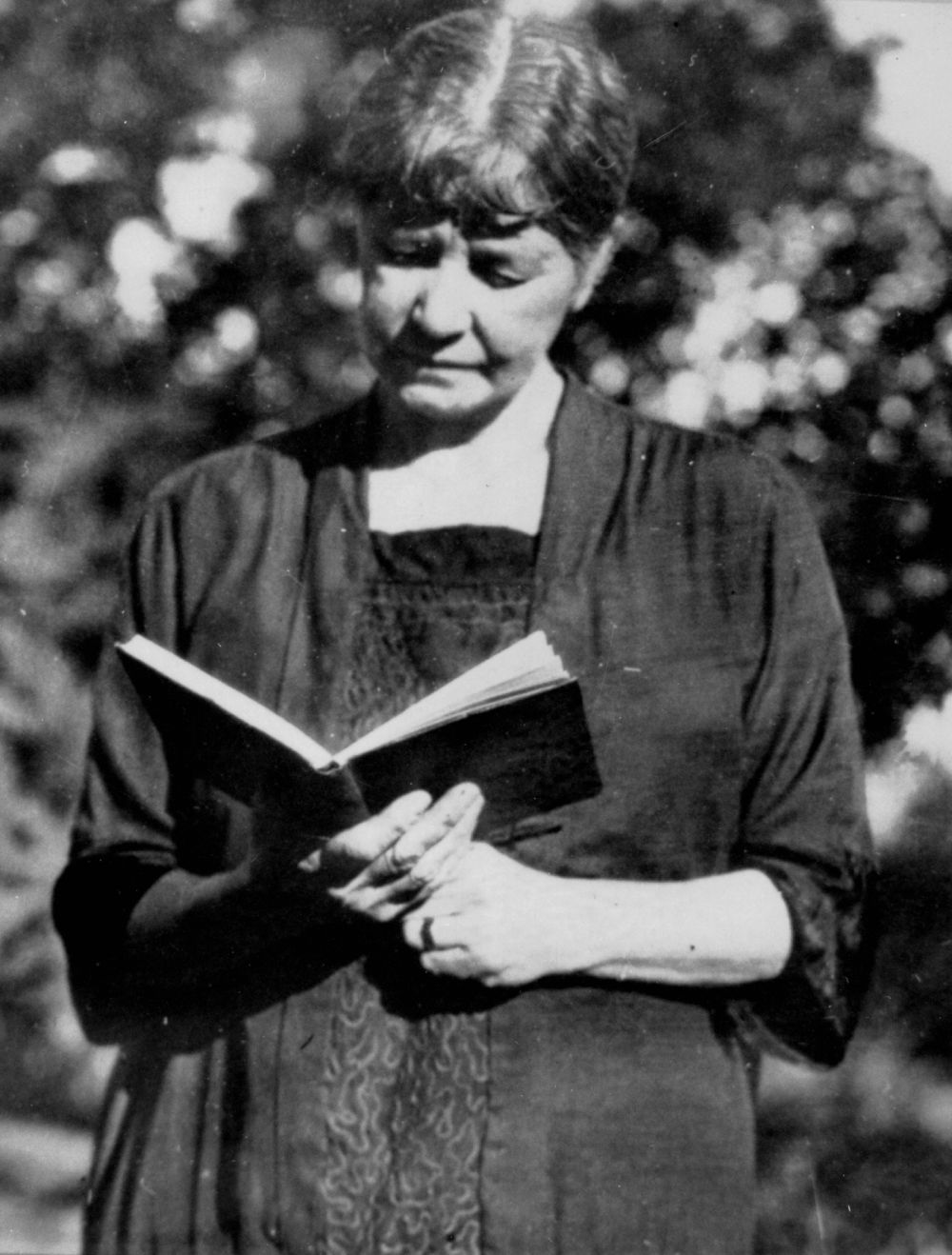
- Emily Coungeau in 1930
- Born: Emily Howard; 3 May 1860; Essex, England
- Died: 26 July 1936 (aged 76); Brisbane, Queensland
- Occupation: poet

Emily Coungeau (3 May 1860 – 26 July 1936) was an English-born Australian poet.

== Biography ==
Although only starting to write poetry after the age of 50, Coungeau was a prolific writer whose work was widely published in Australian newspapers, and in four volumes of poetry published between 1914 and 1934.

Her poems were published in the Brisbane Courier from early 1913.

Coungeau's poem, "Love's Reverie", became a song, set to music by Percy Brier in 1913. In 1922 she wrote the libretto for Alfred Hill's romantic opera, Auster!.

In 1935 Coungeau was awarded life membership of Society of British Authors, Playwrights and Composers. She was a foundation member of the Lyceum Club in Brisbane.

== Personal ==
Coungeau married Naoum (Norman) Cougeau at the registry office in Richmond, Victoria on 21 February 1889. They settled in Brisbane and ran a restaurant and wine bar together. Years later they retired to Bribie Island. Coungeau died in Brisbane on 26 July 1936. Her funeral was held at St. John's Cathedral. Her husband died only weeks later on 6 September. There were no children.

== Works ==
- Stella Australis: Poems, Verses and Prose Fragments (1914)
- Princess Mona: A Romantic Poetical Drama, illustrated by D. H. Souter (1916)
- Rustling Leaves: Selected Poems (1920)
- Palm Fronds: Poems and Verse (1927)
- Fern Leaves: Poems and Verse (1934)
