= F. J. Thwaites =

Australian novelist (1908–1979)

- Born: Frederick Joseph Thwaites; 23 May 1908; Balmain, New South Wales, Australia
- Died: 13 August 1979 (aged 71)
- Occupation: Novelist
- Spouse: Jessica Harcourt (m. 1938)
- Children: 2

Frederick Joseph Thwaites (23 May 1908 – 13 August 1979) was an Australian novelist whose books sold over four million copies. He was best known for his first work The Broken Melody, which was adapted into a 1938 film.

== Biography ==
Born in the inner Sydney suburb of Balmain, Thwaites left school at the age of 13 and originally worked in the clothing industry. He wrote The Broken Melody when he was 19; it was originally self-published but eventually became a best seller, selling 55,000 copies in Australia and 25,000 in England.

In February 1933, Thwaites left for England to write screen scenarios for Elstree Studios. He spent several months there, and several months in Hollywood, attempting to sell his work to movie producers. Thwaites said on his return:

I spent four months in Hollywood but had bad luck with my novels because of copyright laws. It is absolutely essential that after publication of a book in Australia and before three months has passed it has been copyrighted in Washington. I failed to do that, and I have no doubt it cost me the loss of the three pictures, for the picture folk only make pictures of stories that have been out twelve months on the American market and are protected, whereas my stories were open for any American publisher to copy without paying a cent.

He later estimated this cost him £15,000.

On his return to Australia in late 1933, Thwaites then toured the country looking for manuscripts to publish. In 1936, he founded his own publishing firm, The F. J. Thwaites Publishing Co.

In May 1937, Thwaites joined Adelaide radio station 5KA as production manager. During this time he met Jessica Harcourt, who became his wife. She later recalled:

he wouldn't hear of my being an actress any more, so with great regret I left the career I really loved... we travelled all over the world. I was his secretary and note-taker and diary keeper and so on. That was all excitng, but it didn't do for me what I wanted. I wanted a career in movies... He was a marvellous husband and a marvellous writer.

In 1938, Thwaites and his wife left for England via the Pacific Islands and Panama Canal, researching material for novels. They intended to stay in England for three years but World War II saw them return to Australia by the end of 1939.

Thwaites was one of the most popular Australian authors of the 1940s and 1950s, with many of his works being adapted for radio.

In late 1954, Thwaites set up a company in England, Harcourt Press, to publish his books there.

Thwaites was married to actor Jessica Harcourt from 1938 until his death and together they had two sons.

Much of his work was set in the Riverina region. His great-grandfather was Frederick Jenkins, who started Buckinbong Station.

In the late 1960s, Thwaites was financing and managing housing projects.

== Adaptations ==
Thwaites was no fan of the Australian film industry. According to a 1933 interview:

He deplored the presentation abroad of such films as On Our Selection, Harmony Row, The Sentimental Bloke, and The Squatter's Daughter, in all of which there was at least one imbecile or half-wit. People abroad viewing these pictures could not be blamed for coming to the conclusion that about one person in every four or five in Australia was sub normal. The Efftee Studios in Australia were deserving of praise for their pioneering work, but surely it was possible to portray humour on the screen without associating it with lunacy.

The Broken Melody was turned into an Australian film in 1938, directed by Ken G. Hall, who had made On Our Selection and The Squatter's Daughter.

In 1935, it was announced that Broken Wings and Flames of Convention were to be filmed in England but that did not happen. In 1937, The Defender was going to be adapted by National Studios, but that was not done either.

== Reception ==
According to Ron Blaber (in the Australian Dictionary of Biography) although Thwaites was: "seen by critics as romantic and sentimental, his thirty-one adventure novels—characterized by themes of struggle and redemption—were immensely popular, particularly with lending libraries, and sold more than four million copies. Written in 'tempestuous prose', they were crammed with incident and swung between Australian and exotic settings".

== Writings ==
- The Broken Melody (1930)
- Hell's Doorway (1932)
- Flames of Convention (1933)
- Where Gods Are Vain (1934)
- Broken Wings (1934)
- The Melody Lingers (1935) – sequel to The Broken Melody
- The Mad Doctor (1935) – a doctor works in Africa and invents a cure for paralysis
- The Defender (1936)
- The Redemption (1936)
- Rock End (1937)
- A Man of Destiny (1938)
- The Mad Doctor in Harley Street (1938)
- Fever (1939)
- Whispers in Tahiti (1940)
- Wind in the Bracken (1941)
- Shadows Over Rangoon (1941)
- Out of the Dawn (1945)
- They Lived That Spring (1946)
- The Night Closed Down (1948)
- Oasis of Shalimar (1950)
- The Dark Abyss (1951)
- Roof Over Heaven (1953)
- That Was the Hour (1956)
- White Moonlight (1957)
- Husky Be My Guide (1957) – travel book
- No Rainbow in the Sky (1959)
- Press on Regardless (1960) – travel book
- Beyond the Rainbow (1961)
- Destination Spain (1962) – travel book
- A Mountain for Monique (1964)
- Shall Come a Time (1967)
- Sky Full of Thunder (1968)
- No Love to Give (1969)
- Tracks I Knew Not (1973)
