= Eleanor Dark =

Australian novelist

Eleanor Dark AO
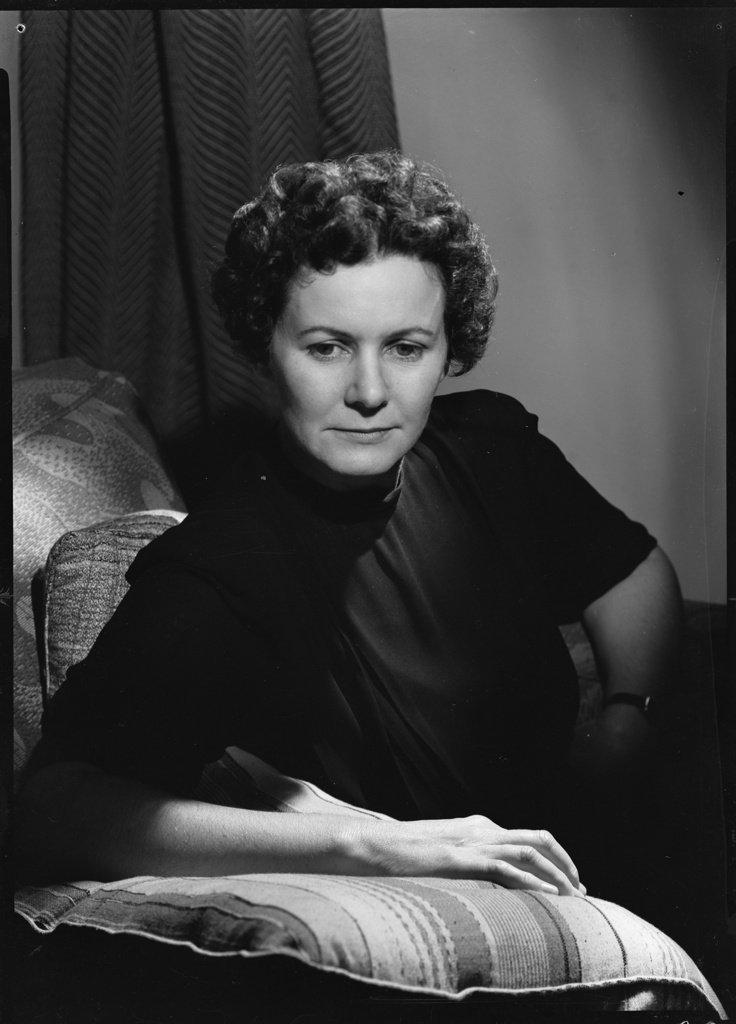
- Dark, about 1945, photographed by Max Dupain
- Born: 26 August 1901; Croydon, New South Wales, Australia
- Died: 11 September 1985 (aged 84); Katoomba, New South Wales, Australia
- Education: Redlands College for Girls; Stott & Hoare’s Business College
- Occupation: Author
- Notable work: Prelude to Christopher; Return to Coolami; The Timeless Land
- Spouse: Eric Payten Dark
- Awards: Australian Literature Society Gold Medal; Alice Award (1978)

Eleanor Dark AO (26 August 1901 – 11 September 1985) was an Australian writer whose novels included Prelude to Christopher (1934) and Return to Coolami (1936), both winners of the Australian Literature Society Gold Medal for literature, and her best known work The Timeless Land (1941).

== Early life and education ==
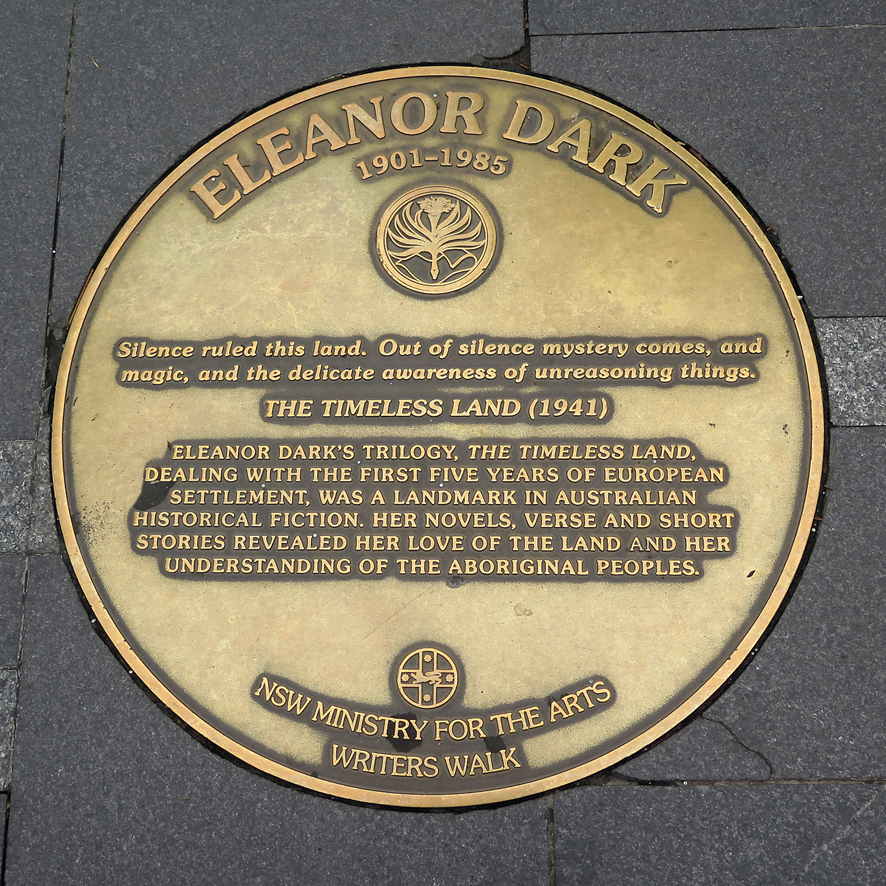
Eleanor Dark memorial plaque in Sydney Writers Walk at Circular Quay

Born Eleanor O'Reilly in Sydney, she was the second of three children of the poet, writer, and parliamentarian Dowell O'Reilly and his wife, Eleanor McCulloch O'Reilly. She studied at the Redlands College for Girls at Cremorne, and was known as Pixie O'Reilly.

== Career ==
Unable to enter university, having failed mathematics, she learnt typing and took a secretarial job. In February 1922 she married Dr Eric Payten Dark (1889–1987), a widower and general practitioner who wrote books, articles and pamphlets on politics and medicine. She became step-mother to his two-year-old son.

Before the Great Depression, Eric Dark was an advocate of the free market and a Liberal voter, then gradually turned, becoming an active member of the Labor left in New South Wales, was involved in contemporary political debate and was a committed socialist and one-time Communist. His books include The World Against Russia and Who are the Reds. They lived in Katoomba, New South Wales, where Eleanor bore their son Michael and wrote eight of her ten novels, as well as short stories and articles.

She was a frequent contributor to Walkabout magazine where she expressed a love of Australian flora. This love is evident in her 1955 article on 'The Blackall Range Country'Iin a 1951 article about the beauty of Central Australia she wrote:

This is luminous country. The naked hills […] are incandescent, and such other colours as exist to afford contrast – the bonewhite trunks of the graceful ghost-gums, the pale yellow tufts of spinifex, and the blue of the sky – seem only to emphasise their furnace glow.

She also wrote under the pseudonym "Patricia O'Rane".

She and her husband were, in September 1949, charter members of the Australian Peace Council.

In the 1950s they bought a farm in Montville, Queensland, where they spent part of the year for seven years. Eleanor wrote her last published work, Lantana Lane at the farm. Their son Michael had also moved to Queensland, where he eventually married and had two daughters. Dr Dark's political writing and involvement in left-wing circles attracted attention from anti-communist elements within the Menzies Government and the Australian Security Intelligence Organisation (ASIO). Like many writers and social commentators of the time who were critical of Menzies or were left-wing, the Darks were under surveillance. This surveillance extended to Eric Dark's first son from his first marriage, John Dark, and possibly to his second son with Eleanor, Michael Dark.

Eleanor Dark's best known work is The Timeless Land (1941), the first part of a trilogy, with Storm of Time (1948) and No Barrier (1953).

She was appointed an Officer of the Order of Australia in the Australia Day Honours of 1977. In her later years she suffered writer's block, osteoarthritis and depression, and lived upstairs as a virtual recluse, rarely seeing friends or relatives. She died in 1985, aged 84.

Michael Dark inherited the family home 'Varuna' in Katoomba, which in 1988 was turned into a writers' centre known as Varuna, The Writers' House. It is managed by the Eleanor Dark Foundation, of which Michael Dark remained President until his death in July 2015.

== Novels ==
- Slow Dawning (1932)
- Prelude to Christopher (1934)
- Return to Coolami (1936)
- Sun Across the Sky (1937)
- Waterway (1938)
- The Little Company (1945)
- The Timeless Land (1941)
- Storm of Time (1948)
- No Barrier (1953)
- Lantana Lane (1959)
