= Diggers in Blighty =

1933 Australian film

- Directed by: Pat Hanna; Raymond Longford (associate director)
- Written by: Pat Hanna additional material Wilfred King; Edmund Warrington; Bert Reid
- Based on: stage material by Pat Hanna
- Produced by: Pat Hanna
- Starring: Pat Hanna; Joe Valli
- Cinematography: Arthur Higgins
- Production company: Pat Hanna Productions
- Distributed by: Universal
- Release date: 11 February 1933
- Running time: 72 mins
- Country: Australia
- Language: English
- Budget: £7,000
- Box office: £18,000

Diggers in Blighty is a 1933 Australian film starring and directed by Pat Hanna. Hanna decided to direct this film himself after being unhappy with how F. W. Thring had handled Diggers (1931).

== Plot ==
While serving in the Australian Army in France in 1918, soldiers Chic and Joe steal some rum from the quartermaster's store. They later help British intelligence pass on some false battle plans to a German spy and are rewarded with ten days' leave in England. They go to a country house in Essex and have trouble with their uncouth manners but help some upper class friends have a romance.

== Cast ==
- Pat Hanna as Chic Williams
- Joe Valli as Joe McTavish
- George Moon as Joe Mulga
- Norman French as Sir Guy Gough
- John D'Arcy as Captain Jack Fisher
- Prudence Irving as Alison Dennett
- Thelma Scott as Judy Fisher
- Edwin Brett as the Colonel
- Nellie Mortyne as Aunt Martha
- Isa Crossley as the sister
- Raymond Longford as Von Schieling
- Guy Hastings as quartermaster sergeant
- Field Fisher as Muddles
- George Randall as Colonel Mason
- Alfred Frith as a Tommie
- Reg Wykeham as WO Pay Corps
- Sylvia Stirling as French adventuress
- Mary Maguire (her film debut)

== Production ==
Pat Hanna was a stage comic whose stage show Diggers was turned into a popular 1931 film by Efftee Productions. Hanna decided to make a sequel. However since he clashed with F.W. Thring of Efftee during the making of Diggers, Hanna formed his own company to make Diggers in Blighty. According to Everyones "In forming his own company, Pat encountered little trouble in obtaining the required capital for its flotation; in fact, remarkable confidence was displayed by well-known Melbourne investors and the capital was over-subscribed in 24 hours." Subscribers included W. R. Kemball, managing director of the Fuller-Kemball-Hayward circuit, the leading- exhibiting combine in New Zealand. In November 1932 Hanna registered Diggers in Blighty Ltd worth £8,000 with £1 shares. Subscribers were George Patrick Hanna, Govan Woolston Cox, and Stanley George Savige.

The script was based on material Hanna had performed on stage for years. Among the writers who contributed material was Edmund Warrington, a British actor who toured in a "digger" company.

Although Hanna did not make the film under the Efftee umbrella, he hired Efftee Studios facilities and technical staff. The film was announced in September 1932 with Raymond Longford to be "associate director".

The film was shot over six weeks commencing in October 1932. Many of the cast had appeared on stage, including Hanna, Valli and Moon. They were joined by comedian Alfred Firth in his film debut. Old Melbourne Gaol stood in for a medieval castle. Filming ended 15 November 1932.

The cast included two Aboriginal Australians and Cass Mahomet, a Hindu soldier in the Australian army.

== Shorts ==
Hanna announced he would make a series of shorts to be released with the film. In December 1933 he finished his first short, "The Long Lost Son," an original comedy sketch by Joe Valli who starred alongside Charlie Albert.

== Reception ==
=== Box office ===
The movie was released on a double bill with an Effee film, Harmony Row (1932) and was a success at the box office. In December 1934 Everyones estimated it and Harmony Row earned £18,000.

However Hanna struggled to get a decent rate of return. The movie was popular in urban centres and also the country.

In March 1934 Hanna stated Diggers in Blighty had been successful but made a net return of £6,500 for a cost of £7,000. There was the problem of competing with American imports when most picture theatres were owned by one organisation. He told the Victorian Talking Pictures Producers Association that "without some security [of screening venues] his company could not seriously consider continuing."

Hanna made one more film, Waltzing Matilda (1933).

=== Reviews ===
Contemporary reviews were poor, the critic from the Sydney Morning Herald claiming that:

Everyone in the play seems to be talking at the top of his or her voice; and talking so fast that the listener often grows quite desperate trying to keep up with them. Any microscopic respites from speech are zealously filled up with bursts of lively music... The directors must realise that actors need directing when they are before the camera. Merely to turn the players (however clever) loose in a drove across the studio floor is fatal... The acting... is often much too violent for the screen; and, in the case of the women, the energetic "registering" of emotion recalls the early days of the silent screen... Mr. Hanna would be wise to consult well-informed opinion concerning his story and his continuity. Both are exceedingly weak.

The Bulletin wrote "It belongs to the Bruce Bairnsfather school of humor, with a dash of Steele Rudd and a spice of romantic melodrama thrown in for makeweight... On its unsophisticated plane the film is replete with matter for hilarity, and leaves the spectator in the comfortable assurance that the art of the film is in no immediate danger of growing up under the management of its present entrepreneurs. Hanna has a sense of the ridiculous and a good feeling for local color. The photography is fine, and the fact that the film was made in Melbourne, though it deals with France and England, is concealed with remarkable ingenuity."

Variety described it as "useless for anywhere else but Australia," adding that it "commences along splendid dramatic lines, but finally becomes poor slapstick" in which "acting in the early scenes is very good, but with the introduction of the comedy element picture fades." However, the reviewer was able to comment that "the photography is a bright spot in otherwise drab production."

Everyones called it " an entertaining mixture of comedy and romantic drama... Technically, the picture is first-rate, and the comedy of Pat Hanna, George Moon, Alfred Frith and Joe Valli kept the crowded audience in roars of laughter, the dialogue often being completely drowned. There is some good character acting... The film proved a worthy successor to the original "Diggers," and was much to the audience’s liking." Another review in the same paper called it, "rowdy but laughable. The rum-in-the-water-trough gag, which was used in "Diggers," bobs up again, but it scores through sheer familiarity. The big punch comes in the final scene, wherein Pat Hanna and Joe Valli, Digger guests at an English house, are forced to drink milk and barley water, while their pal, George Moon, revels in beer. On the serious side Norman French, as the Chief Intelligence Officer, runs away with the honors. His poise and diction are perfect."

The film was released in New Zealand and England.

Filmink later argued the film:

Rried to be more of a proper movie than Diggers – it was less episodic, had more scenes set outside, and tried to give an overall plot... However, the result is a bit of a grab bag – the storylines come and go rather than build, and there’s a lot of talk of events off stage... The photography and sets are first rate. Culturally, it’s invaluable, notably in its depiction of the diggers: dealing with petty tyrants, on the make, singing songs, farewelling ladies; there’s even an appearance from an Aboriginal soldier, Jacky.

== Re-issues ==
Diggers in Blighty proved to have a long life and Hanna re-released it regularly over the next 20 years. It was re-released in Melbourne in 1944 and in 1946 Hanna claimed it and Waltzing Matilda were regularly playing in suburbs.

In 1950 Hanna said he was still making money out of his films and in 1952 Diggers in Blighty and Harmony Row broke box office records in Warrnambool. This prompted Hoyts to pick up the films for a season in Melbourne. The Age film reviewer wrote, "we applaud its simple-minded humor as we would the prize-winning recitation of an only child — self consciously, for this is part of our past, but with a certain pride, for it is a past, we need not be ashamed of." The same critic wrote another review of the film which stated, "you probably need a bond of sympathy to see it through. It was made in seven weeks and shows it in the episodic structure. Pat Hanna, as director, gives evidence of an understanding of film beyond that of many modern directors, but his script is uneven. The appeal of the film with its self-conscious Australianism and its portrait of the Australian soldier as a good-hearted half-wit, is dated."

In 1953 the film was screened at the Victorian Film Festival. It was screening in cinemas as late as 1956.
