= Out of the Shadows (unfinished film) =

- Directed by: A. R. Harwood
- Written by: J. Summers
- Produced by: A. R. Harwood
- Starring: William Greene
- Cinematography: Leslie McCallum
- Production company: Independent Films (A/sia) Pty Ltd
- Release date: 1931
- Running time: 5 reels
- Country: Australia

Out of the Shadows was an unfinished 1931 feature film from A. R. Harwood. He made it after a number of years of working in distribution with the intention of producing Australia's first talking motion picture. The script was by J. Summers, "a Victorian who has had experience in Hollywood".

== Production ==
The movie was a "society romance" shot in Melbourne using a sound-on-disc recording system. During filming, Senator John Barnes, then leader of the Senate, paid a visit to the St Kilda Studio where it was being shot. Independent Films announced plans to make four more movies. However the only set of wax discs buckled in a heat wave before the film was completed and it was never released. The honour of making the first Australian "talkie" went to F.W. Thring's Diggers (1931).

Harwood recovered and used the same cast and crew to make two low-budget films, Spur of the Moment (1931) and Isle of Intrigue (1931).

== Cast ==
- William Greene
- Paul Plunkett
- Edna Lyall
- Syd HolIister
