= Pat Hanna =

New Zealand soldier and entertainer

- Born: George Patrick Hanna; 18 March 1888; Whitianga, New Zealand
- Died: 24 October 1973 (aged 85); Ampthill, Bedfordshire, England
- Occupation: Film producer

George Patrick "Pat" Hanna (born 18 March 1888 – 24 October 1973) was a New Zealand-born film producer. A soldier of the First World War, he entertained post-war audiences with the stage show Diggers, which was adapted for a film of the same title in 1931.

== Biography ==
Hanna was born to Patrick Hanna, a hotelkeeper from Downpatrick, Northern Ireland and an Australian born mother Mary Jane, Hanna's talent for art led him to a signwriting apprenticeship and cartooning for a Wellington, New Zealand newspaper. He enlisted at the start of the First World War as a private in the New Zealand Expeditionary Force where he participated in the Occupation of German Samoa.

In 1916 he joined the Otago Infantry Regiment where he was sent to Egypt, then France and Belgium. He was commissioned a second lieutenant in December 1916 and was promoted to lieutenant in December 1917. His expertise with hand grenades led him to be appointed a Bombing Officer.

Lt Hanna remained in the Army of Occupation following the Armistice becoming Entertainment Officer forming No 1 Entertainment Unit. His orders were to "organise entertainment, lay on laughter unlimited and rollicking relaxation". Hanna set up a concert party called "The Diggers" where he was the director, chief writer and performer. The Diggers toured in Germany, France and England. During this time he invented a scaled down version of badminton called "Batinton" that was played with bats on a smaller court.

Hanna posed for Jack Cato's photograph The Spirit of Anzac.

== Pat Hanna's Diggers ==
Pat Hanna (right) with cast members, George Moon and Cecil Scott, in the talkie film "Diggers".

After leaving the Army, Hanna reformed The Diggers as Pat Hanna's Diggers where they toured New Zealand, then Australia with several former Australian Diggers now in the group; numbering 25. The Diggers featured a musical sister act of Jessie and Hilda Meadows. Hanna married Jessie the pianist in 1922, the couple having two children Ian and Pattie.

Hanna became renowned for creating a caricature of the Digger stereotype and another of an Army Chaplain. One of the Chaplain's monologues The Gospel According to Cricket and Hanna singing Mademoiselle from Armentières became big sellers.

The Digger shows' popularity led to Hanna making his first film Diggers (1931) as actor and writer for Efftee Studios led by Frank W. Thring, the father of Frank Thring. Diggers was Australia's second talking feature. Hanna argued with Thring over the position of his musical numbers in the film leading him to form his own film production company where he produced, directed and starred in Diggers in Blighty and Waltzing Matilda (both 1933) however the films were poorly distributed and not successful.

== Later life ==
Hanna toured America billed as the "Down Under Will Rogers" and returned to Australia where he broadcast on 3LO.

Too old for active service in World War II, Hanna invented a detonation device for a petrol grenade and trained troops and civilians planning to be guerrillas against the Japanese in the use of hand grenades. Hanna encouraged having fun with grenades and combined his knowledge of grenades and entertaining. He published a book in 1941 Grenade Training by Recreational Methods. Hanna's son Ian served with the 2/24 Battalion posing for a drawing of Sybil Craig's called Soldier in a Digger Hat.

Charles Chauvel considered casting Hanna as the lead in his Forty Thousand Horsemen film but was impressed by the younger Chips Rafferty who Chauvel cast in Hanna's place. One of Hanna's Diggers troupe, Joe Valli, reprised his Scottish caricature he played in the Diggers show in the film and Chauvel's The Rats of Tobruk.

Hanna got the rights to some old films from Efftee Studios such as His Royal Highness (1932) and had success re-releasing them along with his old movies.

Hanna and his family moved to England in 1961 where he researched the Clan Hannay's ownership of Sorbie Tower in Wigtownshire Scotland. Jessie Hanna and his daughter Pattie returned to Australia after Pat's death.
