= The Streets of London (1934 film) =

Australian film

- Poster for original stage production
- Directed by: F. W. Thring
- Written by: Frank Harvey
- Based on: play by Dion Boucicault
- Produced by: F. W. Thring
- Starring: Frank Harvey; Campbell Copelin
- Cinematography: Arthur Higgins
- Production company: Efftee Film Productions
- Release date: 1934
- Running time: 85 minutes
- Country: Australia
- Language: English

The Streets of London is a 1934 Australian film directed by F. W. Thring. It was a filmed version of a play by Dion Boucicault which Thring had produced on stage the previous year. It was the last film made by Efftee Film Productions – Thring ceased production afterwards with the aim of resuming it later but died in 1936 before he had the chance.

== Plot ==
Captain Fairweather deposits money with the banker Gideon Bloodgood. After learning that Bloodgood's bank is shaky, Fairweather tries to retrieve the money and dies in an argument with the banker. Bloodgood keeps the money but his clerk, Badger, finds out about it. Years later he blackmails his old boss with proof of the murder.

== Cast ==
- Frank Harvey as Badger
- Ethel Newman as Mrs Fairweather
- Leonard Stephens as Paul Fairweather
- Phyllis Baker as Lucy
- Guy Hastings as Gideon Bloodgood
- Campbell Copelin as Hon. Mark Levingstone
- Noel Boyd as Aleda
- Ashton Jarry as Edwards
- Frank Bradley as Captain Fairweather
- George Blunt as Puffy
- Beatrice Esmonde as Mrs Puffy
- Darcy Kelway as Don Puffy

== Original play ==
The Poor of New York/The Streets of London
- Original language: English
- Written by: Dion Boucicault
- Genre: Melodrama

Premiere
- Date: 1857
- Place: New York

The play was a melodrama originally presented in the US in 1857 as The Poor of New York then adapted to a London setting in 1864 as The Streets of London. This version reached Australia in 1887.

It was revived in London in 1933, with the production sending up the material as a farce. This proved popular, as did Thring's Australian production at the Garrick Theatre in Melbourne in 1933.

== Production ==
Thring decided to film the production as part of a number of theatre adaptations – the other one being Clara Gibbings. He used the same cast as the stage production.

Frank Harvey was reported as working on a script in January 1934. The play had been mounted as a farce but Harvey set it back in its own period and to emphasise that it catered for 19th century tastes. It was done as a play within a play, so the audience would see theatre curtains and glimpses to the audience. At one stage it was announced that the running time would only be 40 minutes but in the end it went for over an hour.

The film appears to have been made immediately after Clara Gibbings in February 1934. Vision of theatre audiences was taken at the Tivoli in Melbourne on 17 February 1934.

== Release ==
The film was rejected for registration under the quality clause of the New South Wales Film Quota Act. It appears never to have had a public screening in Australia.

The film was released in England in 1936 but received poor reviews, Picturegoer's critic calling it:

A burlesque of transpontine melodrama which fails to come off and only succeeds in being tiresomely boring. The actors also fail to enter into the right spirit of burlesque and the production, generally, is of a poor standard.

Peter Fitzpatrick, Thring's biographer, later wrote that seeing the film today "it is still hard to avoid, let alone answer, the question that must surely have struck Frank Thring as he watched its rushes: why was it made?"

The play was re-staged at the Minerva Theatre and featured in the 1952 documentary Theatre in Australia.
