= A Co-respondent's Course =

- Directed by: E.A. Dietrich-Derrick
- Written by: Montague Grover
- Produced by: F.W. Thring
- Starring: Donalda Warne; John D'Arcy
- Cinematography: Arthur Higgins
- Production company: Efftee Film Productions
- Release date: 6 November 1931
- Country: Australia
- Language: English

A Co-respondent's Course is a short 1931 Australian film. The screenplay was written by Montague Grover (1870–1943), an experienced journalist. The film was the first film made by Efftee Studios, a production company owned by F.W. Thring, the first Australian narrative film to be completed with an optical soundtrack and part of the first all-Australian full-length unit programme to be screened in Australia.

== Plot ==
The film is a matrimonial comedy, that featured the dramatic reunion of lovers on London Bridge.

Solicitor James Lord is in love with Nellie. She tells him she is going away for a week with her friend May to Portsea where there are many nice boys. Nellie gets the dates wrong and goes a day early. When James finds out he worries she is cheating on him. His client Rouse comes in and says he is convinced his wife is cheating on him a man called Dane. They hire three private eyes from Sleath's Detective Agency, Hall, Ratchet and Moon, to keep an eye on women.

The bungling of these private investigators provides the film's slight humor. In the end, both men realize their wives are faithful and all's well that ends well.

== Cast ==
- Donalda Warne as Nellie O'Neill
- John D'Arcy as James Lord
- Patricia Minchin as May
- Ed Warrington as Hall
- Oliver Peacock as Ratchet
- George Moon as Moloney

== Production ==
The film was directed by a young European, E.A. Dietrich-Derrick and was written by Monty Grover, editor of Melbourne tabloid The Sun. It was the first film produced by Efftee and was shot between April and June 1931. Filmink wrote "We’re not sure why Thring thought A Co-Respondent’s Course would make ideal film material."

Thring made a cameo in the film but ordered that he be cut out after the first screening.

== Release ==
Diggers (1931) was originally meant to be released on a double bill with The Haunted Barn. However that movie encountered censorship problems and A Co-respondent's Course, although shot later, was selected to support Diggers instead. It encountered trouble from the Victorian censor.

The Age called it "a bright and technically well produced picture." The same paper later called it "an excellent comedy of its kind." Table Talk wrote "Donalda Warne's appearance was wellup to the standard of many we see from the other side, and she should prove the ideal screen heroine. The picture itself, however, was not of thestrongest, and (as in "Diggers") there was a decided anti-climax, the picture seeming to push along a little further than was really necessary." The Weekly Times called it "amusing". The Australasian wrote "The story of the film isscarcely worthy of the excellent technical work that has been lavished on it. To an audience of residents of Melbourne the picture, which is set in the city and on.the Mornington Peninsula, has a special interest. The city streets, the Nepeanroad, Porfsea Beach, and London Bridge were all greeted with a delighted murmurof recognition as they flashed on the screen. A sequence in which a sand-bogged motorist is laughed at by a kookaburra is a typically Australian touch that appealed to the audience."

Peter Fitzpatrick, biographer of F.W. Thring, later wrote that the film was "heavy-going":

The lack of action in many of its dialogue scenes is exacerbated by the static single-take camera work, and by an excessive concern with circumstantial realism that produces 'book-ends' of extended hellos and goodbyes in many scenes, and excruciatingly prolonged telephone calls in which phone numbers are always carefully enunciated and there are long pauses while the caller listens patiently to someone whom we cannot see or hear. And a lot of the conversation is stagey and stilted. Still... the film... [has] at least a period charm.

Fitzpatrick though the movie was partly redeemed by making fun of the absurdity of its male characters and use of external locations.

Filmink wrote that:

The story of A Co-Respondent’s Course is weak –it’s all based on a silly misunderstanding that’s too easily resolved, and not enough happens for its running time. However, the photography is first rate, the location work in and around Portsea is fascinating, the young actors are attractive, and everyone tries very hard. A Co-respondent’s Course is a footnote in the history of early Australian sound cinema, but it’s not without interest.

== See also ==
- Cinema of Australia

== Notes ==
- Fitzpatrick, Peter, The Two Frank Thrings, Monash University, 2012
