= Campbell Copelin =

English and Australian actor (1901–1988)

Campbell Copelin (15 March 1901 – 3 August 1988) was an English actor, who moved to Australia in the 1920s and worked extensively in film, theatre, radio and television. He had a notable association with J.C. Williamson Ltd and frequently collaborated with F. W. Thring and Frank Harvey. He often played villains.

In the early 1930s he appeared in a number of Australian talking films, mostly as a villain but occasionally as a heroic lead.

He returned to England and worked for some time in Hollywood. He went back to Australia in the 1950s and appeared in some early television plays.

== Biography ==
Copelin served in the Army, then emigrated to Australia. He worked on the land, then as a commercial artist before deciding to become an actor.

Copelin fell ill shortly before making Lovers and Luggers.

He moved to London in the late 1930s. After the war he returned to Australia, and worked regularly on stage and appeared in many early Australian television plays.

Copelin died in Melbourne.

== Criminal history ==
In 1928 he was fined for using indecent language and resisting arrest.

On the night of 18 March 1931 Copelin took a £1,000 plane out for a joyride in Melbourne and crashed it into Sandridge golf links, causing him to spend several months in hospital. "I had never seen Melbourne by night," he said, "so I decided to have a look. It was wonderful and I'm going to have another look as soon as I can, but next time I'll do it In a safer way."

He was charged with stealing the plane but these charges were later withdrawn on the basis that he had suffered enough through his injuries. Years later he said he was injured in a general plane accident.

In 1933 Copelin was arrested and fined for stealing a police bicycle.

== Selected filmography ==
=== Film ===
- Two Minutes Silence (1933)
- Clara Gibbings (1934) - Errol Kerr
- The Streets of London (1934)
- A Ticket in Tatts (1934) - Harvey Walls
- Sheepmates (1934, abandoned)
- It Isn't Done (1937) - Ronald Dudley
- Tall Timbers (1937) - Charles Blake
- Lovers and Luggers (1938) - Archie
- Typhoon Treasure (1938) - Alan Richards
- Brighton Rock (1948) - Police Inspector
- Kiss the Blood Off My Hands (1948) - Publican
- Hills of Home (1948) - Minor Role (uncredited)
- Command Decision (1948) - Correspondent (uncredited)
- Sword in the Desert (1949) - Sgt. Chapel
- Challenge to Lassie (1949) - Thief (uncredited)
- Twelve O'Clock High (1949) - Mr. Britton (uncredited)
- Three Came Home (1950) - English Radio Announcer (uncredited)
- Please Believe Me (1950) - English Bobby (uncredited)
- Rogues of Sherwood Forest (1950) - Officer (uncredited)
- Portrait of Clare (1950) - Inspector Cunningham
- Midnight Episode (1950) - The General
- The Brown Man's Servant (Nosey Wheeler) (45 minutes short film, with Victor Platt

=== TV credits ===
- The Brown's Man Servant (1953)
- Saturday Special (1951–53) (Mr. Pike), in 2, of 35, episodes.
- Killer in Close Up - "The Wallace Case" (1957)
- A Dead Secret (1959, TV Movie)
- Ned Kelly (1959)
- Heart Attack (1960)
- Night of the Ding Dong (1959, TV Movie) - Mr. Kelp
- The Big Deal (1961)
- The Lady from the Sea (1961)
- Call Me a Liar (1961)
- House of Mancello (1962)
- Consider Your Verdict (1962) - guest star
- Marriage Lines (1962, TV Movie)
- Lola Montez (1962, TV Movie)
- The Prisoner (1963)
- The Angry General (1964, TV Movie)
- A Man for all Seasons (1964, TV movie)
- Australian Playhouse - "VIPP" (1966)
- Ryan (1974)
- Matlock Police - various guest roles
- Homicide (1973–75) - various guest parts
- The Sullivans (1978) - 4 episodes

=== Select theatre credits ===
- The Unfair Sex (1927)
- Eliza Comes to Stay (1927)
- Outward Bound (1927)
- The Last Warning (1927)
- The Alarm Clock (1927)
- Scandal (1928)
- Sport of Kings (1928)
- Bird in Hand (1929)
- This Thing Called Love (1930)
- In Port (1930)
- Eliza Comes to Stay (1930)
- On the Spot (1931)
- The Calendar (1931)
- A Warm Corner (1931)
- As Husbands Go (1931)
- The Streets of London (1933)
- Rope (1933)
- Collits' Inn (1933)
- Mother of Pearl (1934)
- The Shining Hour (1935)
- Night Must Fall (1936)
- Lovers Leap (1936)
- Grand National Night (1946)
- Frenchie and the Lily (1952)
- Murder Story (1954)
- Nude with Violin (1958)
- Who'll Come A-Waltzing (1962–63) - for JC Williamsons
- Never Too Late (1964)
- Hostile Witness (1967) - with Ray Milland
