= The Magic Shoes =

The Magic Shoes may refer to:

- The Magic Shoes (1935 film)
- The Magic Shoes (1992 film)
