= The Avenger (1937 film) =

- Film poster
- Directed by: A. R. Harwood
- Written by: Bert Hollis
- Produced by: A. R. Harwood
- Starring: Douglas Stuart; John Fernside
- Cinematography: Arthur Higgins; Tasman Higgins
- Music by: Frank Chapple
- Production company: New Era Film Productions
- Distributed by: Atlas Films (Australia); Columbia Pictures (United States; United Kingdom)
- Release date: 1937
- Running time: 55 minutes
- Country: Australia

The Avenger is a 1937 Australian film directed by A. R. Harwood.

== Plot ==
A reformed thief marries a wealthy socialite but is haunted by a former accomplice who tries to frame him for murder.

== Cast ==
- Douglas Stuart as Terry Druton
- John Fernside as Max Hart
- Karen Greyson as Della, the Maid
- Marcia Melville as Gwen
- Marshall Crosby as Detective Sergeant O'Neill
- George Lloyd as Happy Evans
- Raymond Longford as Warren
- Pat Twohill as Solicitor

== Production ==
The movie was produced by New Era Film Productions, a new production company that had been established in Melbourne by Morrell Wright and Cyril J. Turner. A. R. Harwood was director of production.

Filming started in October 1937 and took place at Pagewood Studios in Sydney, while some exterior filming took place at Parramatta.

== Release ==
The movie was ready for trade preview by 17 December 1937 and was distributed in Australia by Atlas Films. It only achieved limited release.

However the film was sold to Columbia for release in the UK, the last Australian film to be admitted under the old British quota law which allowed Australian movies to qualify as local ones. Harwood said this sale recouped 45% of the film's production cost. This was a good enough result for New Era to make another feature, Show Business (1938).
