= Night Club (1952 film) =

- Directed by: A. R. Harwood
- Written by: A. R. Harwood
- Produced by: David Bilcock
- Starring: Joey Porter; Joff Ellen
- Cinematography: Larry Heitman
- Edited by: Barbara Baxter
- Production company: Cambridge Films
- Release date: 1952
- Running time: 55 mins
- Country: Australia
- Budget: £7,000

Night Club is a 1952 Australian film musical directed by A. R. Harwood. It is a remake of Harwood's 1938 film, Show Business.

== Plot ==
Singer Nina Fleming persuades playboy Bill Winters to get his wealthy woolgrower father James to back a show starring her. Bill goes to a country town to work on the script . He meets some local variety acts and persuades James to present them in a city night club act. The show is a success despite the efforts of Nina to stop them.

== Cast ==
- Joey Porter as Nick Adams
- Joff Ellen as Joss
- Joan Bilceaux as Nita Fleming
- Colin Crane as James Winter
- Frank Holbrook as Bill Winters
- Marjorie Harwood as Joan McDonald
- Alex Roy as Jack Hanson
- Ray Jones as compere
- Reg Glenny as detective
- Johnny Goodwin as cleaner
- Barney March
- LLoyd Nairn
- the Carence Sisters
- Tricia Dorran
- the Leonard Boys
- the Spencer Trio
- the Geoff Kitchen Quintette

== Production ==
This was Harwood's first feature in a number of years. The production budget was provided entirely by Melbourne documentary firm Cambridge Films.

The cast were mostly taken from vaudeville, stage and radio, with a number of vaudeville acts appearing. Joan Bilceaux was a blues singer and runner up to Miss Victoria; Joff Ellen was a comedian; Colin Crane had appeared in Show Boat. Harwood cast his daughter as the ingenue and himself as a detective (under the name of "Alex Roy"). Said Harwood at the time:

Comedy is the keynote of the show. That's what the film public is demanding these days. Revivals of old Pat Hanna and George Wallace slapstick comedies are proving an outstanding success.The response demonstrates that the public wants a hearty laugh . . and so that's the type of Australian film I'm concentrating on.

Shooting began on 5 July 1952, partly at the Park Orchards cabaret, near Ringwood. The club was visited by licensing police during filming. Sound was recorded "wild" on a simple wire recorder, making it impossible to synchronise in post production.

== Release ==
Harwood claimed he was so pleased with the comedy team of Joey Porter and Joff Ellen he wanted to put them in another movie together, about Brisbane's show business train. However, Night Club only achieved a limited release and was a failure at the box office, proving to be Harwood's last movie.
