= Gwen Munro =

Australian actress (1913–1970)

Gwendolyn Mina Munro (30 November 1913 – 6 April 1970) was an Australian actress best known for playing the female lead in Orphan of the Wilderness (1936).

== Biography ==
Munro was born in Hobart, Tasmania on 30 November 1913. She grew up in privileged circumstances in Toorak, Melbourne and was partly educated in Switzerland and a finishing school in Paris. On returning to Australia she entered a beauty contest being held by Paramount and won. The prize included a small part in the Hollywood film, Search for Beauty (1934). While in Los Angeles Munro also played the lead role in a production at the Pasadena Playhouse of Dear Bill by Australian writer Jim Warwick.

Munro returned to Australia, where she performed on stage in The Wind and the Rain for J.C. Williamson Ltd. She then received an offer to make Orphan of the Wilderness for Ken G. Hall at Cinesound Productions. Her beauty and background caused her appearance in the film to be much publicised in the local media. Munro fell ill during shooting, helping cause the production to fall four days behind schedule. Nonetheless, director Ken G. Hall was pleased with her performance and used her again in Let George Do It (1938). In between these films she also appeared in Typhoon Treasure (1938) for director Noel Monkman, which was shot on location in North Queensland.

In 1939, Munro married businessman Hubert “Togo” Middows of Sydney, after which she retired. Munro's first marriage ended in divorce a few years later, at which point she met and married Dorr Chandler Ralph, a commander in the U.S. Navy. She died in Baton Rouge, Louisiana on 6 April 1970, at the age of 56.

== Filmography ==
- Search for Beauty (1934)
- Orphan of the Wilderness (1936)
- Let George Do It (1938)
- Typhoon Treasure (1938)

== Radio ==
- The Queen's Necklace (1938)
- Mutiny on the Bounty (1938, repeated 1941) - serial
- Little Woman (1939)
- Trilby (1938, repeated 1941) - serial
