= The White Cockade =

The White Cockade may refer to

- The White Cockade (Millais painting), an 1862 oil painting by the English artist John Everett Millais
- The White Cockade (radio serial), a 1940's and 1950's Australian radio series
- The White Cockade, a song from Jacobite Relics
