= The Man Who Forgot =

The Man Who Forgot may refer to:

- The Man Who Forgot (1917 film)
- The Man Who Forgot (1919 film)
- The Man Who Forgot (1927 film)
