= The Light That Failed (1916 film) =

1916 silent film by Edward José

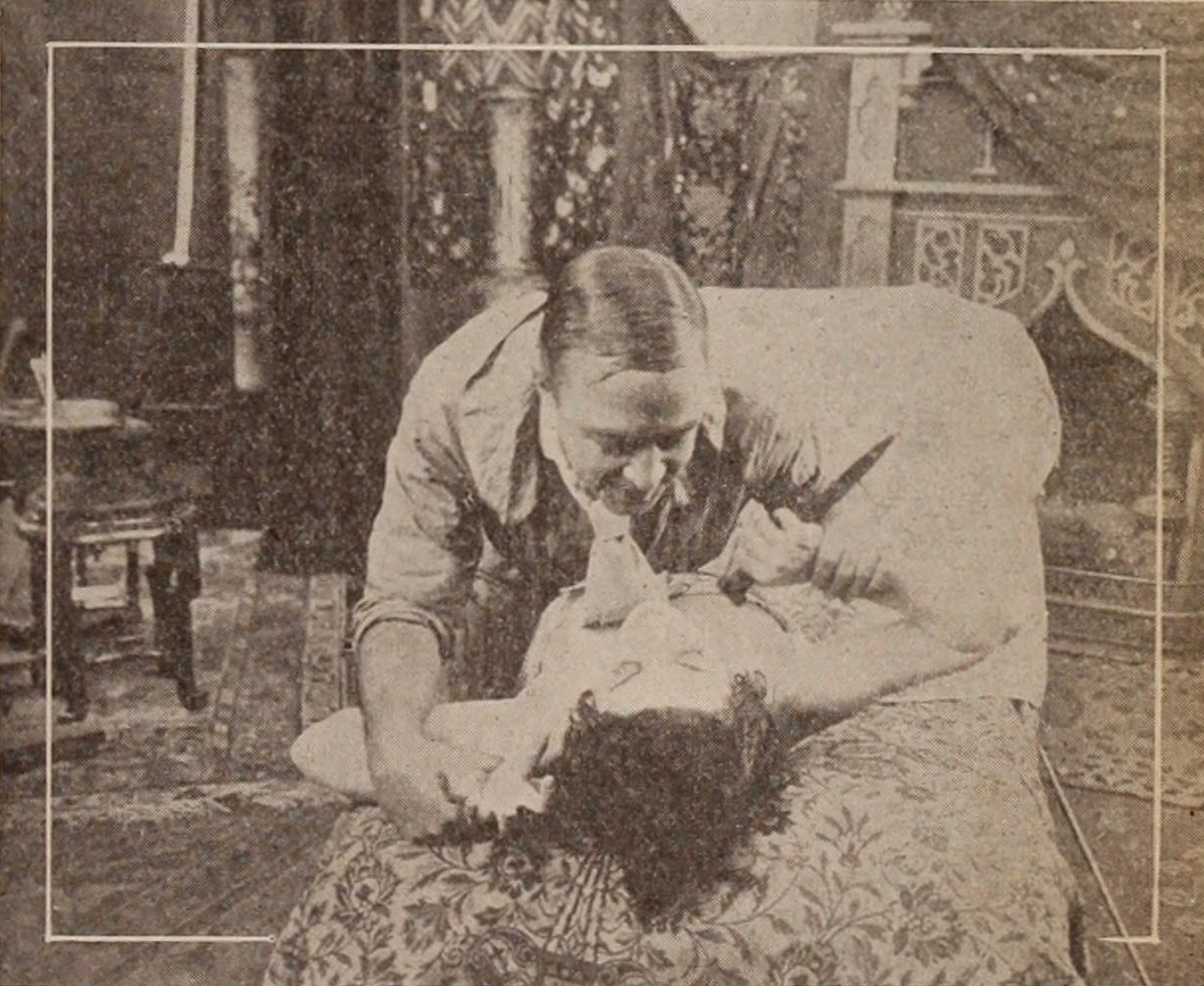
- Directed by: Edward José
- Written by: George B. Seitz
- Based on: a novel The Light That Failed by Rudyard Kipling c.1891
- Produced by: Edward José
- Starring: Robert Edeson; José Collins
- Cinematography: Benjamin Struckman
- Production company: Feature Film Corp.
- Distributed by: Pathé Exchange, Gold Rooster
- Release date: October 15, 1916
- Running time: 5 reels
- Country: USA
- Language: Silent..English titles

The Light That Failed is a lost 1916 American silent drama film produced and directed by Edward José and starring Robert Edeson and José Collins. It was based on the 1891 novel of the same name by Rudyard Kipling and had been performed on the Broadway stage by Johnston Forbes-Robertson and Gertrude Elliott in 1904. It was distributed by Pathé Exchange.

It was filmed at Fayerweather Island, Bridgeport, Connecticut.

== Cast ==
- Robert Edeson - Dick Hedlar
- José Collins - Bessie, the Model
- Lillian Tucker - Maizie
- Claude Fleming - Torpenhow (*aka Claude Flemming)
