= Pagewood Studios =

- Formerly: National Studios
- Type: Film production studio
- Industry: Film production
- Founded: 1935
- Founder: National Studios Ltd
- Defunct: 1959
- Fate: Closed in 1959, sold and redeveloped
- Headquarters: Pagewood, Sydney, New South Wales, Australia
- Products: Motion pictures
- Owner: National Studios Ltd, later Ealing Studios, Associated Television, General Motors Holden

Pagewood Studios was a film studio in Sydney, Australia, that was used to make Australian, British and Hollywood films for 20 years.

== Creation ==
The studio was built in 1935 for National Productions by National Studios Ltd and was originally known as National Studios. It was constructed for the presumed increase in production that most observers thought would result in Australia following introduction of the NSW Film Quota Act. National Studios Ltd was incorporated with capital of £250,000.

Located on Bunnerong Rd and Heffron Rd, previously Maroubra Bay Rd.

They were the first new film studios built in Australia since 1912. Gaumont British helped provide finance and personnel in its construction. After six months of operation, National Studios reported a profit of 26%. However, the studio was soon eclipsed by Sydney's two other sound studios, Cinesound and Figtree Studios at Lane Cove. It was shut down for three years from 1937 to 1940, when it was reopened to make That Certain Something (1940). During World War II, the studio was used as a store depot, a training ground, and as the rehearsal and refitting depot of the Australian Army Entertainment Unit.

== Revival ==
The success of The Overlanders (1946) prompted renewed interest in the studios from English companies looking to make movies in Australia. Ealing Studios shot Eureka Stockade (1949) there and eventually took over the studio, putting it under the management of Eric Williams and overseeing an expensive refurbishment. Ealing used Pagewood for Bitter Springs (1950) and rented it out for Wherever She Goes (1951) and Kangaroo (1952), but plans to film a version of Robbery Under Arms fell through.

== Closure ==
The studio was temporarily shut down again in 1952, which Ken G. Hall called "the worst blow the Australian film industry has ever received, and I believe it is a fatal blow." One year later, it was sold to Associated Television. In 1959, it was sold off completely to GMH, later becoming Holden manufacturing after the Pagewood manufacturing plant closure. Hall later wrote in his memoirs that Pagewood "never did turn out even one commercially successful Australian film".

GMH used it as a storage facility for its archived documents until it was closed down in August 1980. The Studio was demolished & a shopping centre erected on its site in 1987. (GMH employee)

== Films shot at Pagewood ==
- Uncivilised (1936)
- The Flying Doctor (1936)
- Rangle River (1936)
- The Avenger (1936)
- Show Business (1938)
- Below the Surface (1939)
- Dad Rudd, MP (1940)
- That Certain Something (1941)
- The Power and the Glory (1941)
- Eureka Stockade (1949)
- Bitter Springs (1950)
- Wherever She Goes (1951)
- Kangaroo (1952)
- Long John Silver (1954)
- Smiley (1956)
- Robbery Under Arms (1957)
- Smiley Gets a Gun (1958)
- Summer of the Seventeenth Doll (1959)
