= Dear Old London =

1933 film

- Directed by: Claude Flemming
- Distributed by: Efftee Film Productions
- Release date: 1933
- Country: Australia
- Languages: Silent film English intertitles

Dear Old London is a 1933 Australian short film directed by Claude Flemming for Efftee Studios. It is a travelogue of London.

The 34 minute film features scenes of London emerging from the Great Depression, such as tourist monuments, parklands and shopping attractions. Some panoramas of London were filmed from the roof garden of Australia House.

The director Claude Flemming was a veteran stage actor and occasional film director. He returned to Australia Efftee’s production team in late October 1933, after many years working in the United States and England.

The National Film and Sound Archive of Australia has an ongoing project to preserve Efftee Film Productions films of the early 1930s.
