= Betty Roland =

Australian playwright, novelist (1903–1996)

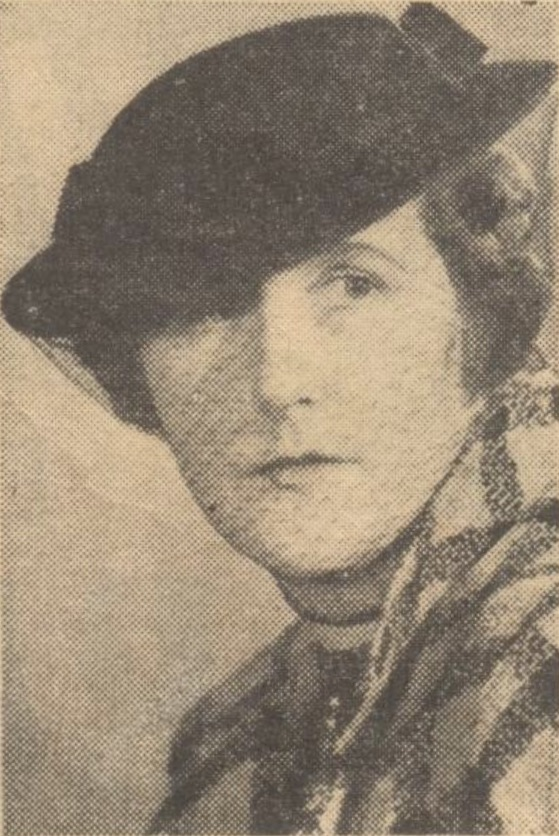
- Roland in 1940
- Born: Mary Isabel Maclean; 22 July 1903; Kaniva, Victoria, Australia
- Died: 12 February 1996 (aged 92); Sydney, New South Wales, Australia
- Occupations: Writer, dramatist, radio plays
- Writing career
- Pen name: Betty M. Davies
- Period: 20th century
- Genres: Drama, children's fiction

Betty Roland (22 July 1903 – 12 February 1996) was an Australian writer of plays, screenplays, novels, children's books and comics.

== Early years ==
Betty Roland was born Mary Isobel Maclean at Kaniva, Victoria, the daughter of Roland and Matilda Maclean. She left school at sixteen to work as a journalist for Table Talk and the Sun News-Pictorial, and married Ellis Harvey Davies in 1923.

== Drama and theatre work ==
Roland wrote plays from the mid-1920s. Her best known play, The Touch of Silk, was first performed in 1928 by the Melbourne Repertory Theatre company, and hailed as "The first Australian play written by a real dramatist". A moving study of the alienation felt by a young French woman who marries an Australian soldier who she meets during World War One and moves with him to a narrow-minded country town. The play was performed in amateur theatres regularly between 1928 and the 1940s and on radio. Roland revised it in 1955. It received its first professional production in 1976 at the Independent Theatre, Sydney, produced by John Tasker and starring Fay Kelton. Currency Press published it in 1974, and again in 1986 with another of Roland's plays Granite Peak. Most recently, A Touch of Silk was broadcast on Australia's ABC Radio National on Sunday 2 January 2011 as part of the Playing the 20th Century series.

Other plays of the 1920s included Feet of Clay, a modern take on the Pygmalion myth, and the Gates of Bronze: a fantasy in four scenes.

Roland's early writing for theatre is mostly romantic drama or comedy. Her later work was agit prop and highly political.

She also wrote the screenplay for what is claimed as the first Australian "talkie", Spur of the Moment, in 1932, credited as Betty M. Davies.

== Guido Baracchi and the Communist Party ==
Roland met the wealthy Marxist intellectual Guido Baracchi, one of the founders of the Australian Communist Party, in the late 1920s. Having left her husband, she booked a passage to the UK in 1933 and discovered Baracchi, also recently separated, was a passenger on the same voyage. They began a relationship, and travelled together to the USSR, where Baracchi was to deliver documents to the Kremlin. While there, Roland worked on the Moscow Daily News, shared a room with Katharine Susannah Prichard, and smuggled literature into Nazi Germany. The first volume of her autobiography, Caviar For Breakfast (1979), was based on her diaries from this period. On their return to Australia, they moved to Sydney, building a house in Castlecrag. Their daughter, Gilda, was born in 1937. In the late 1930s she wrote short, left-wing, agitprop plays, which she regarded as akin to political cartoons, for the New Theatre League in Sydney. The scripts were regularly published in Communist Review, a magazine published by the Communist Party of Australia and edited by Baracchi.

She separated from Baracchi in 1942, and for the rest of the 1940s supported herself and her daughter by writing radio plays, including The First Gentleman, Daddy Was Asleep, The White Cockade, A Woman Scorned, The Drums of Manalao and In His Steps.

She also wrote a comic strip, The Conways, for the Sydney Morning Herald.

From 1948 to 1950 she lived in the Montsalvat artists' colony at Eltham, Victoria. In 1951 she legally changed her name to Betty Roland, and the following year moved to London with Gilda, where she wrote for television and women's magazines, as well as children's books and comic strips for Girl and Swift.

She returned to Australia in the early 1960s, continuing to write radio plays and children's books, and was a founding member of the Australian Society of Authors in 1963, serving on its management committee and becoming an honorary life member in 1993. She moved back into Montsalvat from 1973 to 1979, and wrote her second volume of autobiography, The Eye of the Beholder, about her time there. She published two more volumes of autobiography, An Improbable Life (1989) and The Devious Being (1990). She died in Sydney in 1996.

== Bibliography ==
Plays:

- The Touch of Silk (1928 play) Melbourne University Press 1942; and others.
- Feet of Clay (1928 play) inc. in Playing the Past – Three Plays by Australian Women 1995
- Morning (written 1929 / first performed 1932 play) Produced as a radio play under title New Day in 1945.
- Dr Jekyll and Mr Hyde (serial for commercial radio)
- A Woman Scored (play for commercial radio)
- Granite Peak (1952 play)
- The Touch of Silk and Granite Peak Currency Press ISBN 0-86819-143-4
- The Touch of Silk (with notes by author) Currency Methuen, Sydney 1974 ISBN 978-0-86819-154-6

Novels and Children's Fiction:

- Beyond Capricorn HarperCollins 1976 ISBN 0-00-221449-0
- The Bush Bandits Penguin Australia 1966 ISBN 0-14-030930-6
- The Bush Bandits ill. Genevieve Melrose, Follett Pub. ISBN 0-695-40893-3
- Forbidden Bridge Scholastic Australia 1961 ISBN 0-86896-210-4
- Forbidden Bridge and Jamie's Discovery ill. Geraldine Spence, Random House 1963 ISBN 0-370-11022-6
- Jamie's Other Grandmother w/ Prudence Seward Random House 1970 ISBN 0-370-01209-7
- Jamie's Summer Visitor Scholastic Australia 1964 ISBN 0-86896-701-7
- No Ordinary Man Fontana ISBN 0-00-614478-0
- The Other Side of Sunset Harlequin Mills & Boon ISBN 0-263-05010-6

Autobiographical:

- Lesbos the Pagan Island Cheshire 1963
- Caviar For Breakfast HarperCollins 1979 ISBN 0-7322-2535-3
- The Eye of the Beholder Hale & Iremonger 1984 ISBN 0-86806-169-7
- An Improbable Life HarperCollins 1989 ISBN 0-7322-2523-X
- The Devious Being HarperCollins 1990 ISBN 0-207-16698-6

== Filmography ==
(as Betty M Davies):

- Spur of the Moment (1931) (claimed to be Australia's first talking movie)
- Heights of Danger (1953)
