= Guy Hastings =

English-born actor

Guy Hastings (died 15 March 1941) was an English-born actor who worked extensively in Australian theatre, radio and film.

He arrived in Australia in 1912 and worked for Bert Bailey in the original production of On Our Selection. In the 1930s he was a particular favourite of director A. R. Harwood.

In his later years Hastings developed health problems and in December 1940 he was told he would never act again. The theatre community organised a benefit for him, consisting of a production of a play in which he had appeared, The Streets of London. He died not long afterwards, aged 63.

== Select credits ==
- On Our Selection (1912) – starred in original production of play
- What Happened to Jury (1914) – play
- The Hero of the Dardanelles (1915) – film
- The Ever Open Door (1917) – play
- The Hayseeds' Melbourne Cup (1918) – film
- Called Back (1918) – play
- The Merry Wives of Windsor (1920) – play – Theatre Royal, Adelaide
- Bought and Paid For (1926) – play – Adelaide
- The Ghost Train (1929) – play
- Young Woodley (1929) – play – Theatre Royal, Melbourne
- Spur of the Moment (1931) – film
- Diggers (1931) – film
- The Streets of London (1933) – play – Garrick Theatre, Melbourne
- Secret of the Skies (1934) – film
- Clara Gibbings (1934) – film
- A Ticket in Tatts (1934) – film
- Ten Minute Alibi (1934) – play – Criterion Theatre, Sydney
- Show Business (1938) – film
- Come Up Smiling (1939) – film
- Black Limelight (1939) – play – Minerva Theatre, Sydney
