= Who'll Come A-Waltzing =

1963 Australian comedy play

Who'll Come a Waltzing
- Original language: English
- Written by: Peggy Caine
- Genre: comedy

Premiere
- Date: February 21, 1963
- Place: St Martin's Theatre

Who'll Come A-Waltzing is a 1963 Australian comedy play by South African born Peggy Caine who had emigrated to Australia three years previously. The premise of the play was about British migrants in Australia.

It was staged by J. C Williamson's in the major cities of Australia, at a time when that company rarely put on Australian plays. It was adapted for radio in Australia, England and New Zealand.

It was first performed for radio in 1962.

The original production featured Campbell Copelin and Marion Johns.

== Premise ==
The Eldred family arrive in Sydney and move to a rambling home in an outer suburb. When they have trouble making ends meet, Mrs Eldred takes in boarders, passing them off as family friends to avoid her husband's disapproval.

== Background ==
Peggy Caine moved from South Africa to Sydney in 1959. "I think I've put most of what I know about Australia into this play" she said.

The play debuted in February 1963 directed by Richard Campion at St Martin's Theatre. It had a sell out season over four weeks. JC Williamson's decided to transfer it to a larger theatre and take it on tour. Williamson's gave it a five week season in Sydney starting in July 1963. This run was not successful.
