= Joe Valli =

Scottish-Australian actor (1885–1967)

Joseph George McParlane (also spelled McFarlane and McPharlane; 13 August 1885 – 29 May 1967), known as Joe Valli, was a Scottish-Australian actor who worked in vaudeville and films. He had a long-running vaudeville partnership with Pat Hanna as "Chic and Joe". He has been described as one of the busiest character actors in Australian films.

== Biography ==
Valli was born in Glasgow, the son of engineer Joseph McParlane and Agnes Gill. He worked as a builder and engineer before working in entertainment.

In 1914 he enlisted in the Australian Army.

Valli toured Australia in 1916 in a comedy Tickets Please with Harry Clay and the Royal Follies. He returned home in 1917 but emigrated to Australia after World War One.

Valli made his film debut in Diggers and appeared in sixteen more features after that.

In 1941 he was in the AIF Entertainment Unit.

An operation on his throat in 1948 rendered him unable to speak, effectively ending his career. Reports from this time said he was destitute. A fundraiser was held for him in August 1948. Valli went to live at Actors' Equity Benevolent Fund's settlement at Sussex Inlet, where he worked as a caretaker. (A scene in the film Tall Timbers had Letty Craydon demand Valli give up smoking.)

In 1952 Valli was reported living on Dangar Island in the Hawkesbury. He wrote in to a quiz show Strike it Rich asking for a chance to win a stove and was successful with Vic Seixas representing Joe.

He died in Waterloo, New South Wales, of myocardial degeneration .

Valli's son, Jim McFarlane, also did some acting.

== Theatre credits ==
- Tickets Please (1916)
- the New Zealand Famous Diggers (1921–22) — touring Australia and New Zealand
- toured US late 1923 (August–October)
- Hanna's Famous Diggers (1923–31)
- The Cedar Tree (1934)
- Jolly Roger (1935)
- Home Brew (1935)

== Selected filmography ==
- Diggers (1931)
- Waltzing Matilda (1933)
- Diggers in Blighty (1933)
- Heritage (1935)
- The Flying Doctor (1936)
- Orphan of the Wilderness (1936)
- Tall Timbers (1937)
- Let George Do It (1938)
- Typhoon Treasure (1938)
- Dad Rudd, MP (1940)
- Forty Thousand Horsemen (1940)
- Racing Luck (1941)
- The Power and the Glory (1941)
- 100,000 Cobbers (1942)
- The Rats of Tobruk (1944)
- Harvest Gold (1945)
- Smithy (1946)
- Eureka Stockade (1949)

== Select radio ==
- The Digger Show (1940)
