= Nobody's Child (1919 film) =

1919 film by George Edwardes Hall

Nobody's Child is a 1919 British silent film directed by George Edwardes Hall from his own play The Whirlpool. The film was made by British and Colonial Film and ran for 5 reels. The cast included José Collins as Francesco Samarjo, Godfrey Tearle as Ernest d'Alvard, Ben Webster as Joseph Samarjo, Christine Maitland as Countess Akhea, J. Fisher White as Baron Troejfer, Saba Raleigh as Baroness d'Alvard.
