= Show Business (1938 film) =

- Directed by: A. R. Harwood
- Written by: Frank Chapple; Alex Rosenblum (additional dialogue)
- Produced by: A. R. Harwood
- Starring: Bert Matthews
- Cinematography: Arthur Higgins
- Music by: Frank Chapple
- Production company: New Era Film Productions
- Distributed by: Atlas Films
- Release date: 7 August 1938
- Running time: 90 mins
- Country: Australia
- Language: English
- Budget: £8,000 or £12,000

Show Business is a 1938 Australian film musical directed by A. R. Harwood and starring Bert Matthews. It is considered a 'substantially lost' film, with only rushes from a single minor scene left.

== Plot ==
Two brothers, Bill and Wally Winter, become infatuated with a gold digger, Nina Bellamy. She persuades them to ask their wealthy father, Sir James, for £10,000 so Bill can produce a stage show and Wally a movie, both starring Nina. Sir James discovers the truth about Nina and gives his son the money, provided they leave town in secret for one month to write their shows and that they only use new talent.

Bill goes to a country town and discovers a local amateur group. He buys their show and brings it to the city, where it is a big success. Wally meets a girl from a local film exchange and they decide release an old Australian film with comic commentary. An angry Nina tries to disrupt the preview of the film but fails and it is a big success. Nina then tries to blackmail Sir James but fails.

== Cast ==
- Jimmy McMahon as Wally Winter
- John Barrington as Bill Winter
- Bert Matthews as Cogs
- Joyce Hunt as Nina Bellamy
- Fred Tupper as Fred Hamilton
- Chick Arnold as Red
- Bonnie Dunn as tap dancer
- Barbara James as singer
- Betty Matear as Jean
- Guy Hastings as Sir James Winter
- Doulgas Stuart as Benson
- Fay Astor as Elsie
- Charmaine Ross as Joan
- Paul Leon as Jackson
- Jimmy Coates as his band
- the Pathe Duncan Ballet

== Production ==
Harwood claimed he had a great deal of difficulty casting the female leads, seeing over 700 applications. Shooting started in April 1938 at Cinesound's studio in St Kilda, Melbourne. The studio was found to be too cramped and inadequately equipped so the unit was shipped to Sydney in May where the film was completed at Pagewood Studios. Shooting wound up in July.

Filming was also suspended due to an amendment to the British Quota Act which meant that Australian films were no longer considered "British" under a local quota.

Many of the cast were popular radio personalities at the time.

== Reception ==
The film passed the quality test under the NSW Film Quota Act. It was not a commercial success, and Harwood was forced to seek work as a suburban manager and insurance agent. He later remade the film as Night Club (1951).
