= José Collins =

English actress and singer (1887–1958)

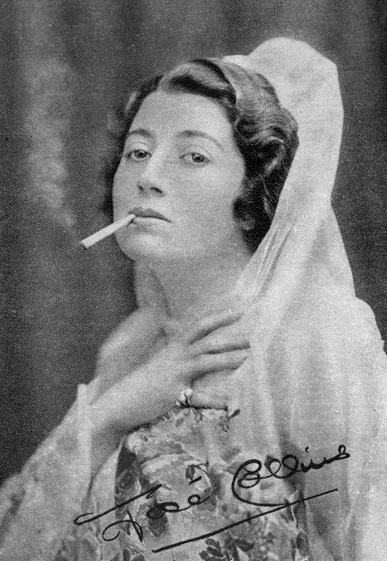
- Born: Charlotte Josephine Collins; 23 May 1887; London, England, U.K.
- Died: 6 December 1958 (aged 71); Epping, Essex, England
- Other name: Lottie Collins Jr.
- Occupations: Music hall artist, singer, actress
- Spouses: Leslie Chatfield (m. 1911) Lord Robert Innes-Ker (m. 1920; div. 1935) Gerald B. Kirkland (m. 1939)
- Parent(s): Stephen Patrick Cooney and Lottie Collins

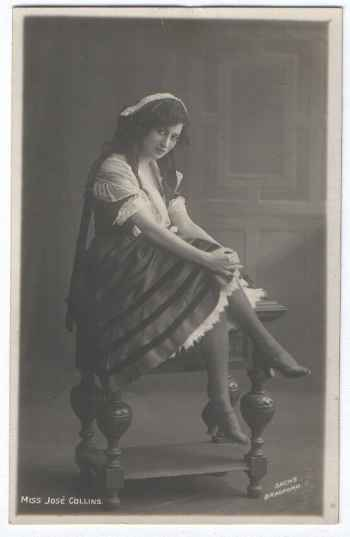
José Collins, actress

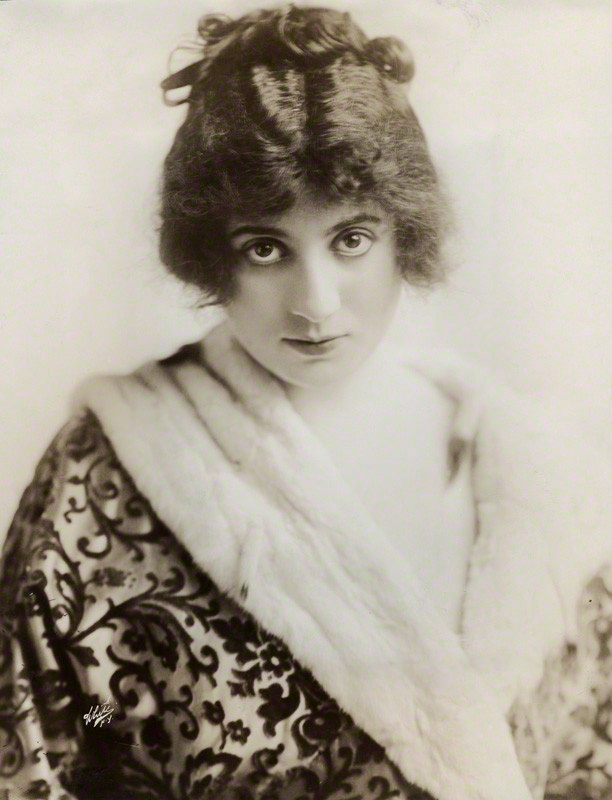
Collins in 1914

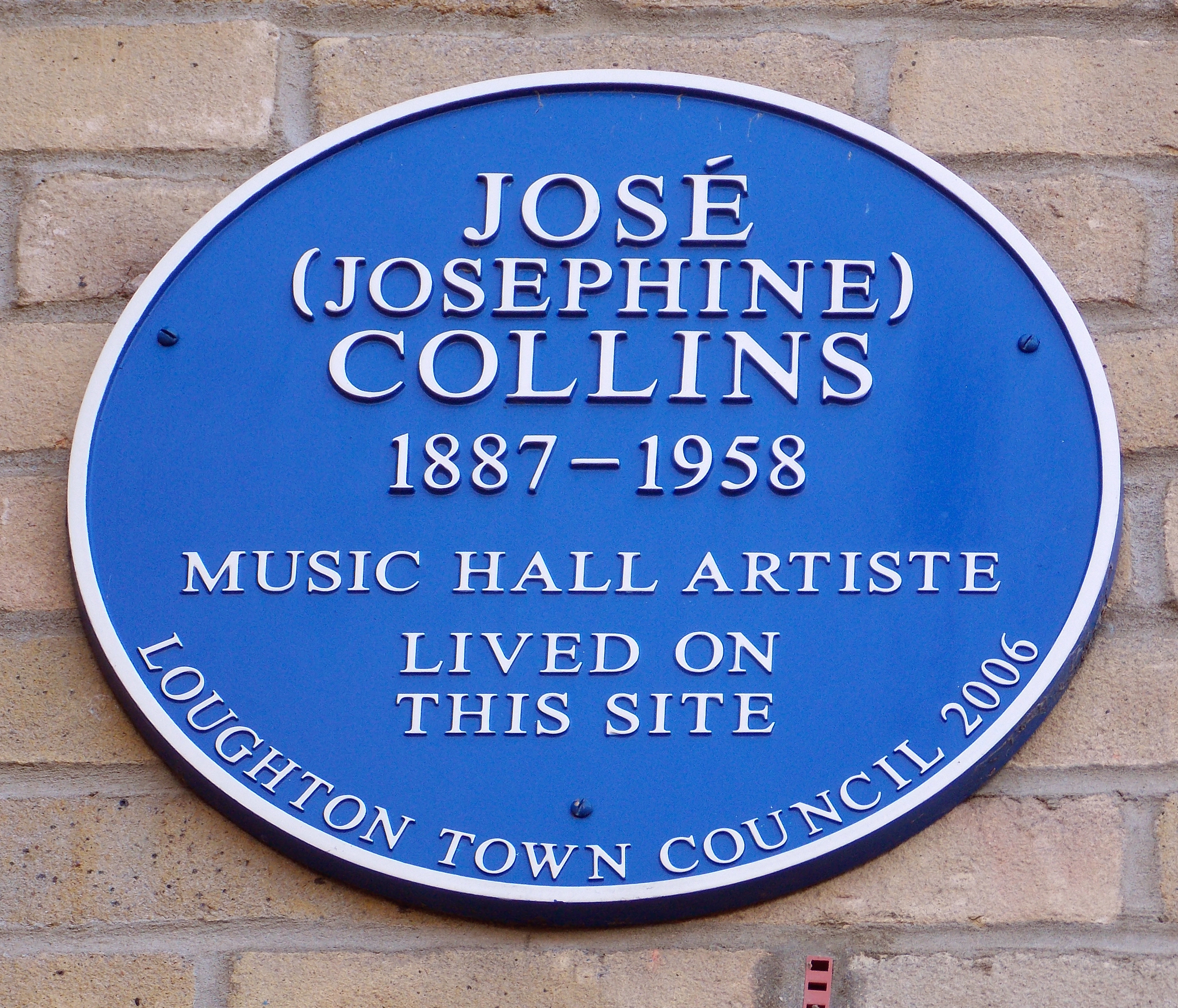
José Collins' blue plaque, High Road, Loughton

Charlotte Josephine Collins (23 May 1887 – 6 December 1958) was an English actress and singer known by her stage name, José Collins, who was celebrated for her performances in musical comedies, such as the long-running The Maid of the Mountains, and early motion pictures.

== Background ==
Collins was born in London 1887 to music hall performer and comedian Lottie Collins, who popularized the song "Ta-ra-ra Boom-de-ay!". Her mother later married her music coach, Stephen Patrick Cooney, and Collins took the name Charlotte Josephine Cooney.

== Career ==
Collins got her start as a child performer, and by the age of 17 she had appeared in both pantomime and music hall as a singer and actress. She made her West End debut in a principal role in The Antelope (1908). On Broadway, she appeared in Vera Violetta (1911), The Merry Countess (1912), (and sharing a duet with Al Jolson), The Whirl of Society (1912), among others. Her revue appearances included the Ziegfeld Follies (1913), and The Passing Show (1914). Collins recorded the song Just You and I and the Moon, composed by Dave Stamper with lyrics by Gene Buck, from the Ziegfeld Follies (1913). She also starred in The Happy Day in London and Alone at Last on Broadway (both in 1916).

Collins played the title role of Teresa, the gypsy bandit maid, in the hit musical The Maid of the Mountains (1917) to great acclaim, and as a result became known by the nickname of "Maid of the Mountains". The musical ran for 1,352 performances. In that show, she introduced the songs "Love Will Find a Way" and "A Paradise For Two". Collins played throughout the long run of this show and in many revivals over the years.

Collins later appeared in Our Peg (1919), A Southern Maid (1920), Sybil (1921), The Last Waltz (1922), Catherine (1923), Our Nell (1924) and Frasquita (1925). She spent the remainder of her career in revues, variety and non-musical roles, as well as in films. In her film career, she starred as Bessie, the vengeful model, in The Light That Failed, (1916, based on Rudyard Kipling's poem), and she appeared in The Imposter (1915), A Woman's Honor (1916), and The Sword of Damocles (1920), among others. Her only musical film was Facing the Music (1933).

== Personal life ==
Collins was married three times: firstly, in 1911, to Leslie Chatfield; secondly in 1920 to Lord Robert Innes-Ker (brother of the 8th Duke of Roxburghe); and lastly to Dr Gerald Kirkland. Collins had no children by any of her marriages; her second marriage ended in divorce in 1935.

She is commemorated by a blue plaque at Loughton. When erected, the plaque was on the actual house in which she lived towards the end of her life. This was demolished, and replaced by a block of flats called Collins Court.

== Filmography ==
- The Impostor (1915)
- A Woman's Honor (1916)
- The Light That Failed (1916)
- Victory and Peace (1918)
- Nobody's Child (1919)
- The Sword of Damocles (1920)
- The Velvet Woman (1923) *short
- The Last Stake (1923) *short
- The Courage of Despair (1923) *short
- The Battle of Love (1923) *short
- The Shadow of Death (1923) *short
- Secret Mission (1923) *short
- Facing the Music (1933)

== Sources ==
- Collins, José. The Maid of the Mountains: Her Story. The reminiscences of José Collins. With 60 Illustrations. (1932, Hutchinson)
- Gammond, Peter. Oxford Companion to Popular Music (1993, Oxford University Press) ISBN 0-19-280004-3
- Larkin, Colin Ed. Guinness Who's Who of Stage Musicals ISBN 0-85112-756-8
