= Sheepmates =

Proposed Australian film

- Directed by: F. W. Thring
- Written by: William Hatfield
- Based on: novel by William Hatfield
- Produced by: F. W. Thring
- Starring: Frank Harvey
- Production company: Efftee Studios
- Release date: 1934 (intended)
- Running time: incomplete
- Country: Australia
- Language: English

Sheepmates was a proposed Australian film from director F. W. Thring based on a 1931 novel by William Hatfield. It commenced filming in 1933 but was abandoned.

== Original novel ==
Hatfield's novel was published in 1931. It concerned an Englishman, Atherton, who goes to Australia and gets a job on a sheep station.

The Bulletin said "The writer knows what he is talking about; knows the men he is writing about, their soil, and the way they talk and think."

Another review said "The novel is not a Bush story in the generally accepted sense, and is almost womanless; but it is an arresting picture of Central Australian outposts that men, at least, will relish."

The novel would be read out on radio in 1939.

== Development ==
Thring bought the rights to Hatfield's novel in mid 1933. He paid the author a reported £300. By that stage the book had sold 20,000 copies.

Tom Holt, Efftee's manager, stated that:

The production of 'Sheepmates' is a decided departure from our policy of adhering to comedy. It is a truly remarkable drama of out back Australia, artistically in a class above anything we have yet attempted. Though it may not prove as popular as a Wallace comedy, we are satisfied to produce it merely as an example of our ability to handle this class of subject. No woman appears in the cast, and for this reason it may be described as 'A Journey's End of the Bush'.

The movie was meant to be the first shot at Efftee's new studio at Wattle Path Palais, St Kilda, Melbourne.

Hatfield himself wrote the script. There were no female characters in the movie, as had been the case with the book. Thring also signed Hatfield to write a stage version.

Thring stated, "1 shall present a cast of male actors many of whom are already familiar on the English screen, such as Frank Harvey, Henry Wenman, Claude Flemming and Harold B. Meade. This will undoubtedly be of value in marketing the picture in Great Britain. "

== Shooting ==
Filming began in September 1933. After completing some studio scenes, the crew departed to the Queensland and South Australian border for six weeks of shooting around various cattle stations, notably at one owned by Sir Sidney Kidman near Coopers Creek and at Naryilco Station near Tibooburra.

The crew initially consisted of Thring, Hatfield and some assistants, plus various camera and sound men; actors did not come until they finished appearing in Thring's stage production of Rope in Melbourne on 7 October. There were a number of scenes shot involved cattle mustering.

Shooting was difficult. Thring suffered from exhaustion, several crew members narrowly escaped death in a tent fire, and cattle mustering scenes were delayed due to communication difficulties. Hatfield also claimed that the stage commitments of the actors made finishing the film hard.

On the unit's return to Melbourne, studio shooting was postponed to January because the St Kilda facilities were not ready. However all the scenes involving actor Henry Wenham had to be filmed because he was returning to London.

In June 1934 Thring announced he would make Desert Saga from a script by Hatfield, and when that was done would recommence Sheepmates. Thring was also going to film another story by Hatfield, Ginger Murdoch.

Thring later decided to abandon production (and postpone all his other planned movies) due to uncertainty about whether the Government would introduce a quota for Australian pictures.

== Subsequent fate ==
In 1936 Thring announced Sheepmates would be one of several novels he was taking with him to Hollywood, with a view to having American writers adapt them into screenplay form, suggesting he still intended to use the footage he had shot. However, Thring died soon after he returned to Australia in June and Sheepmates was never completed.

== Cast ==
- Frank Harvey as Richards
- Campbell Copelin as Atheron
- Claude Flemming
- George Wallace as Fawkner
- Guy Hastings as Lindsay
- Victor Fitzherbert
- Henry Wenham as Fritz
- Harold B Meade as Braithwaite
- Marshall Crosby as Ryan
- Darcy Kelway as Pants, the steward
