= Swan Song of the Arunta =

Swan Song of the Arunta is a 1952 Australian radio feature by William Hatfield based on Hatfield's book Desert Saga.

== Desert Saga ==
Hatfield's book Desert Saga was published in 1933.

The Age said " It is obvious that he has studied the Australian aborigines, and that in presenting their customs, habits and mentality, in tho form of a story, he has adhered to truth."

The Brisbane Telegraph called it " complete and unflattering picture, touchingly sympathetic to the black fellow, ruthlessly scathing to the white invader."

== Premise ==
"From the point of view of the corroboree-maker, Grungunja, Hatfield presents a sympathetic picture of the effects of white settlement on the aboriginals. There are clashes with early gold-seekers; killings and savage retaliation. Natives released after long imprisonment find their old hunting-grounds disturbed and are driven to spear cattle. Missionaries intervene. Eventually anthropologists take a hand, seeking to reconcile Stone Age lore with the white man’s culture."
