= William Hatfield (writer) =

Australian writer

William Hatfield (1892–1969) was the pen name of Ernest Chapman, an English-born writer best known for his work in Australia.

He emigrated to Australia in 1912 and did a variety of jobs before turning to writing with Sheepmates in 1931. He wrote fiction for adults and children, travel stories, autobiography, short stories (particularly for The Australian Journal and Australiana). Hatfield served in the Australian army during World War II.

He was, in September 1949, a charter member of the Australian Peace Council.

Hatfield died on 2 February 1969 at Concord, New South Wales.

== Film work ==
Sheepmates was meant to be filmed in 1934 by F. W. Thring, and Hatfield helped scout locations, but the project was abandoned during shooting. Hatfield promised Thring to shoot some footage of an aboriginal corroboree for a proposed screen version of Collits' Inn during a cross-country trip, but the film did not eventuate. Thring also bought the rights to Ginger Murdoch as a vehicle for George Wallace but died before he got a chance to make it. He was also linked to a Thring-Noel Monkman project called 'The Desert Saga.

Cinesound Productions announced a film version of Hatfield's novel Big Timber but instead chose to shoot an original script, Tall Timbers (1937).

== Selected writings ==
- Sheepmates (1931)
- Ginger Murdoch (1932)
- Christmastown (1932)
- Desert Saga (1933)
- River Crossing (1934)
- Black Waterlily (1935)
- Australia Through the Windscreen (1936)
- Big Timber (1936)
- I Find Australia (1937)
- Buffalo Jim (1938)
- Barrier Reef Days (1948)
- Wild Dog Frontier (1951)

=== Radio ===
- Swan Song of the Arunta
