= Claude Flemming =

Australian actor, writer, producer and director (1884–1952)

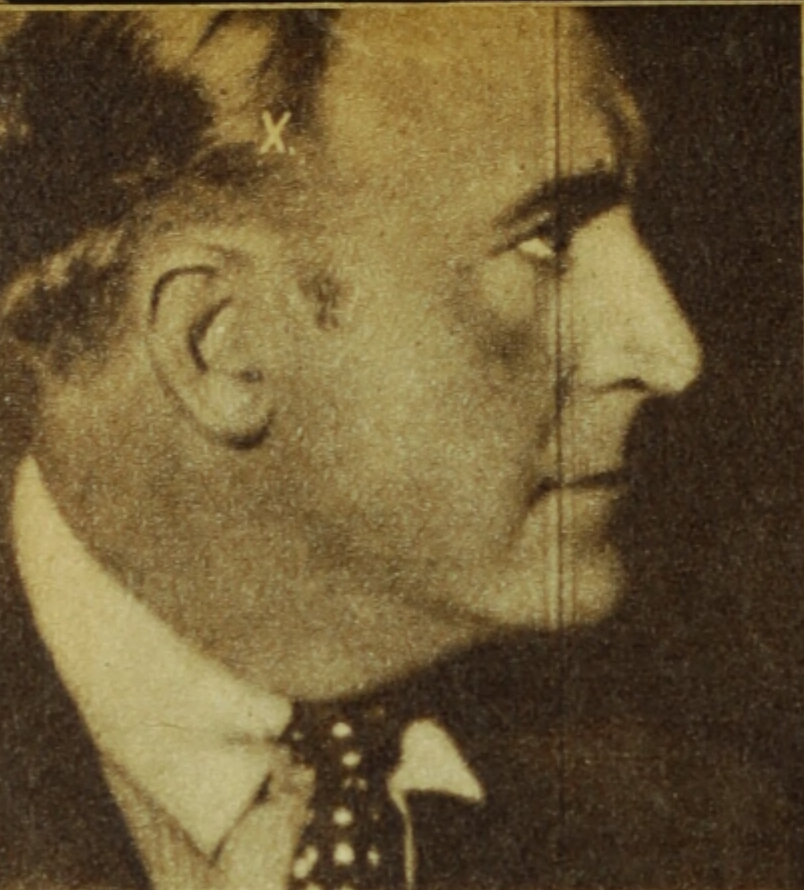
Claude Flemming

Claude Flemming (1884–1952) was an Australian actor, writer, producer and director of theatre and film whose varied stage career spanned the first half of the 20th century. He performed in Shakespeare and other drama, as well as opera, and became a music comedy specialist.

== Biography ==
Flemming was born in Camden, New South Wales. He made his stage début for George Rignold's Shakespeare company in Sydney in 1903. Soon afterwards, in England, he appeared on tour with Herbert Beerbohm Tree's Company and then performed in grand opera at Covent Garden (Die Meistersinger, The Angelus). He later played in Edwardian musical comedy and operetta in the West End, including in Fallen Fairies (1909) and in New York. During and after the First World War, he toured in his homeland with the J. C. Williamson company in such musicals and operettas as The Chocolate Soldier, The Maid of the Mountains, A Southern Maid, The Firefly, The Cousin from Nowhere, Sybil and Lilac Time.

He acted and directed in several silent films in 1917 and 1918. Later, in America, he had a stint as a voice coach in Hollywood during the early years of sound films and as a company director for Efftee Studios. He directed The Magic Shoes (1935), the first screen performance of Peter Finch. He also worked as supervisor of productions at radio station 2CH in Sydney.

His last stage work in Australia was as Col. Buffalo Bill in the Australian premiere in Melbourne, and subsequent three-year tour, of Annie Get Your Gun from 1947 to 1950.

== Selected filmography ==
- The Test (1916)
- Trilby (1917) – actor
- The Lure of the Bush (1918) – director, actor
- £500 Reward (1918) – director, actor, producer, writer
- The Sword of Damocles (1920) – actor
- Captain of the Guard (1930) - actor
- Bride of the Regiment (1930) - actor
- Too Many Wives (1933) - actor
- Dear Old London (1933) (short) – director
- Sheepmates (1934) (uncompleted film) – actor
- The Magic Shoes (1935) (short) – director
