= Typhoon Treasure =

- Directed by: Noel Monkman
- Written by: John P. McLeod
- Based on: story by Noel Monkman
- Produced by: Noel Monkman
- Starring: Campbell Copelin; Gwen Munro; Joe Valli
- Cinematography: George D. Malcolm; Harry Malcolm; Bruce A. Cummings (underwater)
- Production company: Commonwealth Film Laboratories
- Distributed by: United Artists (Aust)
- Release dates: September 1938 (Australia); 1943 (UK)
- Running time: 89 minutes
- Country: Australia
- Language: English

Typhoon Treasure is a 1938 Australian adventure film directed by Noel Monkman and starring Campbell Copelin, Gwen Munro, and Joe Valli. It is set in New Guinea although shot on the Great Barrier Reef and the Queensland coast. It was Monkman's first dramatic feature film after several years making documentaries. The film has been called "a tidy, unpretentious adventure melodrama, which was executed with relative competence, had a bit of a run in cinemas (including the UK and USA), then faded from view."

== Premise ==
Alan Richards is the sole survivor of a pearling lugger which has been shipwrecked on Pakema Reef during a typhoon. He sets out to recover some pearls which went missing in the wreck, crossing through the jungle and fighting headhunters.

== Cast ==
- Campbell Copelin as Alan Richards
- Gwen Munro as Jean Roberts
- Joe Valli as Scotty McLeod
- Douglas Herald as Buck Thompson
- Kenneth Brampton as Alfred Webb
- Norman French as patrol officer
- Utan Walters as Utan
- Marshall Crosby
- Moncrieff Macallum
- Ossie Wenban
- Douglas Channell
- Benjamin Brown

== Production ==
=== Development ===
In the mid-1930s, Noel Monkman was working with F. W. Thring making documentaries. Thring offered to back Monkman in making a dramatic feature, and provided him with a writer, John P. McLeod.

In June 1935 Monkman announced he and Alan Mill had bought the film rights to a novel, A Recipe in Rubber by Robert Stock. It would be filmed as The Gloved Hand.

By August 1935 Monkma announced he would make Typhoon Treasure rather than A Recipe in Rubber. Joe Valli signed on to play a lead role that month.

Thring planned to make the movie after visiting Hollywood in 1936 but died that year.

Cinesound Productions offered to buy the script but Monkman elected to make it himself. He formed a syndicate with Bruce Cummings and Commonwealth Laboratories, who provided the crew.

=== Shooting ===
Filming commenced June 1937. The film was shot mostly on location in North Queensland, on the Great Barrier Reef, the Yorke Peninsula and locations around Cairns including Russell River, Lake Barrine, Mulgrave River Michaelmas Reef and Green Island. Joe Valli started filming in June but Gwen Munro did not arrive until October.

Torres Strait Islander Utan had a key role.

After the location work was completed, some studio scenes were filmed at Commonwealth Film Laboratories' studio at the Sydney Showground.

Music was collated from popular classics including Tchaikovsky's Swan Lake.

=== Death of crew member ===
While filming underwater scenes on Green Island in October, one of the divers, James Bell, died of myocarditis. Bruce Cummings, who was in charge of underwater photography, went down in a diving cylinder, followed a few minutes later by Bell, who was his assistant. A few minutes later Cummings noticed something was wrong with Bell. When they brought him to the surface he was dead. An inquest was later held which found no negligence.

== Release ==
Reviews generally found the story formulaic but enjoyed the direction and settings.

Smithy's Weekly wrote "flicking lighting, sound that is at times fading and in distinct and a need for more severe editing detract from this melodramatic picture."

Variety said "his looks like a quickie turned out by some British producing outfit although there is no way of telling whether made in Great Britain, Australia or Canada. It largely follows early talking picture technique; at other junctures, the production soimds like a silent jungle adventure subject with added sound and score. At best, it is a feeble fill-in for the lower section of a dual setup. None of the cast is even faintly recognizable to American audiences. Just as well, because their thespian efforts are rudimentary. "

Filmink argued:

The movie is creaky. Continuity is odd, the public domain music score (including extracts from Swan Lake) is annoying, some of the acting is erratic, the pacing is all over the place, shots don’t always match, you can tell it was made by someone inexperienced in drama, and it’s about as racially sensitive as you’d expect from a 1938 film set in New Guinea... But, there are so many things about the movie that are endearing – the liveliness of Gwen Munro (a screen natural who should’ve had a bigger part), the location work, the notion of lounge lizard Campbell Copelin playing an action man and doing quite well, the spectacle of actors genuinely paddling in canoes and climbing down rocks, its utter lack of pretension and determination to entertain.

Ken G. Hall later said "I knew Noel Monkman quite well and I was impressed by him. Especially his microphotography and his underwater photography. I wasn’t impressed by his first feature, Typhoon Treasure."

It was sold to America and played in cinemas there in 1939 and a shortened version of the film screened in England in 1943. It was screening in American cinemas as late as 1950.

In the 1950s rights to the film were bought by George Malcolm who cut it down to 40 minutes and reissued it as The Perils of Pakema Reef.
