= The Touch of Silk =

Play written by Betty Roland

- Original language: English
- Written by: Betty Roland

Premiere
- Date: 3 November 1928
- Place: Repertory Theatre, Melbourne

The Touch of Silk is a 1928 Australian play by Betty Roland about a French girl who marries a former Australian soldier after World War I.

It was produced around Australia and was adapted several times for radio. At one stage Katharine Cornell was reportedly interested in taking the play to Broadway.

The play was inspired by Roland's childhood.

== Radio adaptation ==
The play was adapted for ABC radio in 1957.
