= Pearl Lust =

- Directed by: A. R. Harwood
- Produced by: A. R. Harwood
- Starring: Fay Revel; John Bowden
- Edited by: A. R. Harwood
- Production company: Apex Films Ltd
- Release date: 1936
- Country: Australia

Pearl Lust is a 1936 Australian film directed by A. R. Harwood. It was shot in 16mm and was never released theatrically as it was aimed at the home movie market.

== Production ==
The movie was a South Seas romance, shot on location in Portsea and at Cinesound Production's studio in St Kilda. Filming took place in August and September 1936.

It was the first film produced under quota requirements in Victoria.

== Cast ==
- Fay Revel
- John Bowden
- George Edwards
- Lance Nicholls
- Fred McNaughten
- George Arthur
