= Big Timber (novel) =

1936 novel by William Hatfield

- Author: William Hatfield
- Language: English
- Genre: Novel
- Publication date: 1936
- Publication place: Australia
- Media type: Print
- Pages: 266

Big Timber (1936) is a novel by Australian author William Hatfield. It was originally published in Australia as a serial in The Sydney Morning Herald in 40 daily instalments, between 25 February and 10 April 1936.

The first print edition was published by Angus and Robertson later in 1936. It was published in new editions by the same publishing company in 1937 and 1938.

== Plot summary ==
"Set chiefly in the timber-milling districts of eastern Australia, with a chapter or two overseas, where some useful contrasts are gathered in. International flavor heightened by a woodchopping between a Canadian and an Australian. The story is a conventional poor-boy-rich-girl romance which the author has made the vehicle of a considerable knowledge of the timber industry and of the lives of trees."

== Critical reception ==
A reviewer in The Australasian newspaper praised the author for incorporating his themes of re-afforestation and conservation of natural resources. They continued: "Of the bush and the timbered heights he writes feelingly and with knowledge. His people are ordinary folk. His plot is well handled, and the story written with more than mere competence."

A short review in The Bulletin noted that, with this novel, the author "appears as an evangelical aboriculturist. There is room for him."

== Note ==
- In 1935 Cinesound Productions announced that it intended to make a film based on a short story by William Hatfield that would be set in the timber industry. Cinesound instead made two other films and finally decided not to adapt Hatfield's story. They eventually produced Tall Timbers in 1937.
