= Clara Gibbings =

- Written by: Frank Harvey
- Based on: Clara Gibbings, a 1928 play by Aimée & Philip Stuart
- Produced by: F.W. Thring
- Starring: Dorothy Brunton; Campbell Copelin
- Cinematography: Arthur Higgins
- Production company: Efftee Film Productions
- Release date: 13 October 1934
- Running time: 81 minutes
- Country: Australia
- Language: English
- Budget: £5,000

Clara Gibbings is a 1934 Australian film directed by F.W. Thring about the owner of a London pub who discovers she is the daughter of an earl. It was a vehicle for stage star Dorothy Brunton.

== Synopsis ==
Clara Gibbings is the straight-talking owner of a London dockland public-house who discovers she is the legitimate (but abandoned) daughter of the Earl of Drumoor. She launches herself in high society but soon becomes disillusioned with their morals. In the process "she manages to get home some clever thrusts against the shams and hypocrisy of the life of elegance that she had thought so wonderful". Clara falls in love with a young aristocrat, Errol Kerr, who proposes, and they go off to live in Australia.

== Cast ==
- Dorothy Brunton as Clara Gibbings
- Campbell Copelin as Errol Kerr
- Harvey Adams as Justin Kerr
- Noel Boyd as Yolande Probyn
- Harold Meade as Earl of Drumoor
- Byrl Walkley as Lady Drumoor
- Marshall Crosby as Tudor
- Russell Scott as Gallagher
- Guy Hastings as Ted

== Original play ==
Clara Gibbings
- Written by: Aimee & Philip Stuart
- Original language: English
- Genre: melodrama

Premiere
- Date premiered: Vaudeville Theatre, London
- Place premiered: 19 November 1928

The script was one of a number of play adaptations from F.W. Thring.

It was based on a 1928 English play which had originally been called The Broken Line. The original London production starred Violet Lorraine. The Observer declared it was "not an admirable play." The Guardian said "Miss Lorraine acts with the utmost effect."

The play was produced on Broadway under the title of Lady Clara starring Florence Nash. Variety wrote the play "won't ring any fire alarms here. For most part of Its three acts it's a stitlted affair, relieved only by the wisecracks of Clara Gibbings."

=== 1933 Thring stage production ===
Thring produced a version of the play in Melbourne starting 26 August 1933 with Ruby May in the title role. It was part of a policy by Thring to show plays which could be adapted for the screen. (Clara Gibbings would be followed by Rope starring Frank Harvey). Thring would produce shows at the Garrick and the Princess Theatres - the former would be for dramas and comedies while the latter would be for musicals.

Many of the cast in the stage play of Clara Gibbings would reprise their roles in the film version. The director was Gregan MacMahon.

One of the cast, Beatrice Day, collapsed during the dress rehearsal and died later in hospital. She was replaced by Nellie Mortyne.

The Age called Thring's stage production "an unqualified success". The Bulletin wrote "there is rippling comedy in the play, together with sound drama and genial satire of war-time aristocratic London... The keynote of the McMahon production was the general excellence of the characterisation of the local players." The Australasian said the play "won the instantaneous appreciation it deserves."

==== Cast ====
- Ruby May as Clara Gibbings
- Campbel Copelin
- Noel Boyd as Yolande Probyn
- Lyle Christian as Justin
- Harold Mead as Earl of Drumoor
- Beatrice Day/Nellie Mortyne as Countess of Drumoor
- Marshall Crosby as butler
- Frederick Hughes

== Production ==
In January 1934 it was announced Thring would make a film of the play for Efftee, along with a movie from another British play The Streets of London. This was a change of departure from Efftee, which had traditionally only used Australian source material. (Efftee insisted it would continue to film some Australian stories such as Collitts' Inn, Sheepmates and Ginger Murdoch.) According to Filmink Thring "may have been motivated in part by a desire to double dip on the material (i.e. he could make a play and a film) and also produce something that wasn’t too expensive (play adaptations typically only have a few sets) and might have more appeal to international audiences."

The film was shot at Efftee's St Kilda studios in March 1934.

Although Thring was credited as director, it is likely Frank Harvey did most of the actual direction on set. A scene set at Lords was shot at St Kilda's Oval.

Even before shooting, Thring announced he would close the studios after making the movie due to difficulties in getting his product released outside Melbourne.

Filming finished by April. Thring did make another film before shutting down the studio, The Streets of London (1934), and announced plans to revive production, but died before he was able to.

"I took one look at myself in the 'rushes' – and looked away", admitted Brunton. "I simply could not bear to see myself any more. I thought I looked terrible."

== Reception ==
The film was previewed on 31 August 1934 at the Liberty Theatre. The Truth called it "an excellent exemplification of what can be done in Australia with English material, and the critic feels no need for the apologetic addenda, 'good for an Australian production'."

September and released in Melbourne at the Mayfair Cinema on 13 October where it was reported as "recording excellent business". Reviewers commented on the fact it was basically a filmed play. Filmink noted the film "seems to have been one of those movies that was simply received with profound indifference."

It won third prize (amounting to £750) in a competition held by the Commonwealth government in 1935. The judges said the film "contained sparkling dialogue supported by competent acting, although the adaptation of the English play on which it was based was inadequate." However, as of 1936 the film had not been seen on Sydney screens. It was released in England but received poor reviews.

Peter Fitzpatrick, biographer of Thring, later described the movie as looking "like a run-of-the-mill British B-picture, and that is at once a badge of proficiency and a mark of its remoteness from everything that Effree stood for."

Filmink wrote" The play itself isn’t that crash hot, a sort of theatrical “programmer” that they made back in the day... and your enjoyment of it will probably depend on how much you engage with Dorothy Brunton as a star... We will say, though, that the love story between the characters of Brunton and Copelin is quite well done." The same magazine argued the film was influential on a later Australian film written by Harvey It Isn't Done.

== Notes ==
- Fitzpatrick, Peter The Two Frank Thrings, Monash University, 2012
