= The Sword of Damocles (film) =

1920 silent film

- Directed by: George Ridgwell
- Written by: George Ridgwell
- Based on: Leonie by H. V. Esmond
- Produced by: Edward Godal
- Starring: José Collins; H. V. Esmond; Claude Fleming
- Production company: British & Colonial Kinematograph Company
- Distributed by: Butcher's Film Service
- Release date: August 1920
- Running time: 65 minutes
- Country: United Kingdom
- Languages: Silent; English intertitles

The Sword of Damocles is a 1920 British silent drama film directed by George Ridgwell and starring José Collins, H. V. Esmond and Claude Fleming.

== Cast ==
- José Collins as Leonie Paoli
- H. V. Esmond as Hugh Maltravers
- Claude Fleming as Geoffrey Moray
- Bobby Andrews as Jack Moray
- Thomas Nesbitt as Bruce Leslie
- Chigquita de Lorenzo as Una Paioli
- Edward Sorley as Raikes
- Tom Nesbitt as Bruce Leslie

== Bibliography ==
- Low, Rachael. The History of British Film (Volume 3): The History of the British Film 1914 - 1918. Routledge, 2013.
