= The Secret of the Skies =

- Film poster
- Directed by: A. R. Harwood
- Written by: Larry Brewer
- Produced by: A. R. Harwood
- Starring: John D'Arcy; Guy Hastings
- Cinematography: Stan Pentreath
- Edited by: A. R. Harwood
- Music by: The Early Victorians
- Production company: Centenary Films
- Distributed by: Universal
- Release date: April 1934
- Running time: 56 mins
- Country: Australia
- Budget: £4,000
- Box office: £325

The Secret of the Skies is a 1934 Australian film directed by A. R. Harwood about a bank robber who crashes an aircraft in remote bush. The story was inspired by the 1931 disappearance of the Australian National Airways aircraft the Southern Cloud.

== Plot ==
Hal Wayne (Norman Shepherd), a bank clerk, has absconded with £10,000 of his bank's money. He hijacks an aircraft, the Golden Eagle, which crashes in the mountains.

Wayne steals the remaining food and abandons the others to their death. He is driven half-mad in the wilderness and throws away his money before being found by a prospector and returned to civilisation. But he is haunted by guilt and three years later confesses to police.

== Cast ==
- Paul Allsop as Larry Hamilton
- Norman Banks as first announcer
- Ella Bromley as Anne Walters
- John D'Arcy as Captain Sinclair
- Jimmy Dee as Monty Wright
- Guy Hastings as Detective Palmer
- Fred Patey as Frederick Holtz
- Norman Shepherd as Hal Wayne
- Ada Koradgi as Miss Mckenzie
- Eddie Balmer as second announcer

== Production ==
The Secret of the Skies was partly shot in Cinesound Production's new studio facility in St Kilda, Melbourne in July 1933.

== Release ==
Harwood managed to arrange distribution through Universal although he later claimed that the release was delayed too long. Critical reception was generally poor. One reviewer said:

"If one is to spend an hour on a mountain top with seven, stranded travellers it is desirable that they should be amusing or interesting in some way or other. Except for the pilot (played extremely well by John Darcy) they are ill at ease, and their conversation is starchy. This conversational stiffness is emphasised by the lack of action, particularly on the part of the camera, which is set down in front of the unhappy party, and stays there without a movement for minutes on end. But the film has its moments of vitality. The actual crash is first-rate; and quite equal to similar instances in American pictures... In some of the scenes in the bush one is made to feel the remoteness of the travellers and the hopelessness of their position; but elsewhere stagey treatment and acting often rob the film of the spontaneity and the dramatic intensity it should have possessed."

Despite a production cost of several thousand pounds the film only returned £325 to the producers.
