= Diggers (1931 film) =

1931 Australian film

- George Moon, Cecil Scott, and Pat Hanna in "Diggers".
- Directed by: F. W. Thring
- Written by: Pat Hanna; Eric Donaldson; C. J. Dennis (dedication verses)
- Based on: stage show by Pat Hanna & Eric Donaldson
- Produced by: F. W. Thring
- Starring: Pat Hanna; Joe Valli
- Cinematography: Arthur Higgins
- Production company: Efftee Film Productions
- Distributed by: Fox (Australia); Universal (UK)
- Release date: 13 November 1931
- Running time: 61 minutes (Australia)
- Country: Australia
- Language: English
- Budget: £9,000 or £7,000
- Box office: £20,000-£30,000

Diggers is a 1931 Australian comedy film produced and directed by F. W. Thring starring popular stage comedian Pat Hanna. It was the first feature film from both men.

The movie is based on Hanna's stage show, and is concerned with the adventures of Australian soldiers during World War I.

== Plot summary ==
Two Australian 'cobbers', Chic and Joe, attend a reunion 12 years after World War I and reminisce about their exploits together in France. They recall three incidents in particular. Firstly, the time they were in hospital and ingeniously feigned an illness to stay away from active service and the front line. Secondly, when the 'cobbers' attempt to steal rum from the British Army store. And finally, they recall relaxing in a French cafe while a fellow Digger romances the waitress (Eugenie Prescott).

== Cast ==
- Pat Hanna as Chic Williams
- George Moon as Joe Mulga
- Joe Valli as McTavish
- Norman French as medical officer
- Guy Hastings as Quarter-Master Sergeant
- Eugenie Prescott
- Cecil Scott as Bluey
- Edmund Warrington as Fatty
- John Henry as a tommy
- Rutland Becket as SM
- Harry McClelland as Sergeant-Major Booth
- Royce Milton as CO

NB: The George Moon above is George Moon Snr. Although well known in Australia during the 1920s for his dance partnership with Dan Morris (as Moon and Morris), he is now often confused with his son, British actor George Moon Jnr (father of actress Georgina Moon). For further details on George Moon Snr and Moon and Morris see Moon and Morris at Australian Variety Theatre Archive

== Production ==
The movie was part of Efftee Film Productions' initial group of pictures, including A Co-respondent's Course and The Haunted Barn. The cost of making these and establishing the studio came to £80,000.

The script was adapted from Hanna's popular stage show. Eric Donaldson was the writer primarily responsible for adapting it to screen.

The film was shot in Thring's studio in His Majesty's Theatre, Melbourne. A cast of over 200 people was used.

According to Bert Nicholas, Arthur Higgins' assistant, Hanna and Thring often argued throughout the shoot. Hanna insisted that he was in nearly every shot of the film and insisted on the scenic model shots that Thring thought were unnecessary but which Hanna thought needed to tie everything together.

However Thring prevailed in a disagreement about the structure of the movie. The original stage show consisted of the same reunion dinner and three flashback episodes, but in a different structure – it started with the attempt to steal rum, then dealt with the waitress romance, and finished with the hospital sketch. The film was shot in the same order but Thring restructured it during editing. These changes annoyed Hanna, who decided to form his own production company to make his follow up films, Diggers in Blighty (1933) and Waltzing Matilda (1933).

== Release ==
Diggers was released in Melbourne on a double bill with the short A Co-respondent's Course. Public response was at first poor but the film performed well in country areas. It was re-released in Melbourne on a double-bill with The Haunted Barn and was a success at the box office. Thring says that the movie earned £2,000 in one Melbourne theatre alone. In 1938 Hanna estimated the film had earned between £20,000 and £30,000.,

The movie was also released in England where it achieved 400 bookings, less successful than Thring's later His Royal Highness.

Thring's biographer Peter Fitzpatrick later wrote that:

Diggers is driven... by three things that made Hanna's concert parties a hit: the rapport between Chic, long and lean as the proverbial pull-through, and Joe, his little mate, as they battle authority in all its forms; George Moon's genius for physical comedy; and, above all, a delight in verbal gags built on the intrinsic slipperiness of language, especially as used by Chic and Joe.

Variety gave the film a poor review claiming:

The dialog is a cross between very poor Australian and bad English. Real Australians do not chatter like the production leads one to believe. Outside Australia, picture would be bad advertisement for this country... Surely for the first locally produced talker a better story could have been picked... Ending is sudden and meaningless. Six reels were deleted before release. Picture carries no appeal to women. Australians can produce good pictures, but first they must learn to buy good stories. Diggers will probably get money here, but cannot possibly expect to succeed overseas against the competition of the Hollywood products.

Filmink wrote "The main interest of Diggers is that it captures a piece of cultural history, particularly its depiction of soldiers in World War One: plucky, rebelling against authority, up for a drink and a good time, not keen to be shot at... there’s a string of melancholy and sadness through the whole film, particularly the ending. The photography is excellent, the production values are quite strong, the comic performances are memorable."

== See also ==
- Cinema of Australia

== Notes ==
- Fitzpatrick, Peter, The Two Frank Thrings, Monash University 2012
