= The Man Who Forgot (1927 film) =

1927 film

- Directed by: A. R. Harwood
- Produced by: A. R. Harwood
- Starring: Walter Nicholls; William Hallam
- Cinematography: William Hallam
- Distributed by: Walter Nicholls; William Hallam; A. R. Harwood
- Release date: 1927
- Running time: 5,000 feet
- Country: Australia

The Man Who Forgot is a 1927 silent Australian feature film which marked the directorial debut of A. R. Harwood. It is considered a lost film.

Harwood called it a "beautiful horrible failure."

== Production ==
Little is known about the movie apart from the fact it was a low-budget melodrama shot outdoors to save on studio costs. The story included scenes at the Ascot racecourse in Melbourne, a fight on the brink of the Werribee Gorge, timber felling in the Dandenong Rangers, and an escape by the hero in an aeroplane at the Essendon Aerodrome.

== Release ==
Harwood distributed the film himself in partnership with his leading actors Nicholls and Hallam. They showed it on a double bill with Jewelled Nights (1925) around rural Victoria. Harwood, Nicholls and Hallam then announced plans to make a second feature together, a farce called Struth, but the project was abandoned and Harwood spent the next few years in distribution.

== Cast ==
- William Hallam as Crazy Dan
- Walter Nicholls as Stephen Jackson
