= Isle of Intrigue =

1931 film

- Directed by: A. R. Harwood
- Written by: A. R. Harwood
- Produced by: A. R. Harwood
- Cinematography: Leslie McCallum; Ed Wintle
- Production company: A. R. Harwood Talkie Productions
- Release date: 26 September 1931
- Running time: 50 minutes
- Country: Australia
- Language: English

Isle of Intrigue is a 1931 Australian film directed by A. R. Harwood. It was one of the first Australian talking movies.

== Plot ==
The pearling schooners of a trading firm are being robbed by a mysterious pirate. The son of the owner of the firm (James Alexander) goes to the South Pacific island of Avita to investigate and uncover the pirate's identity, vindicating a man who has been unjustly accused. He also has a romance.

== Cast ==
- James Alexander
- Helene Best
- John Cairns
- Darcy Kelway
- Norman Shepherd
- Dorothy Stanward

== Production ==
The film was filmed and released simultaneously with Spur of the Moment (1931), using many of the same cast and crew.

== Reception ==
Reviews were generally positive.
