= The Haunted Barn =

1931 film

- Labor Call 26 November 1931
- Directed by: Gregan McMahon; E.A. Dietrich-Derrick
- Written by: Thomas A. Swain
- Produced by: F.W. Thring
- Starring: Thelma Scott
- Cinematography: E.A. Dietrich-Derrick; Arthur Higgins
- Production company: Efftee Film Productions
- Distributed by: Hoyts
- Release date: 28 November 1931
- Running time: 45 mins
- Country: Australia
- Language: English

The Haunted Barn is a short 1931 Australian comedy film produced by F.W. Thring directed by Gregan McMahon. It was one of the first productions by Thring's Efftee Studios. The film was produced to support of the feature Diggers (1931) and shown on the same bill.

Thring's biographer later called the movie a "dog's breakfast" directed by two men "who could never have worked productively together".

== Plot ==
John Moon is a businessman interested in ghosts. He decides to spend the night in a barn hoping to see the ghost of the bushranger Sturdy who died there when betrayed to the police by his friend Rogan.

He is visited by two lovers, Ralph and Joan, seeking to elope, and worried about reprisals from Joan's father. Rose enters with a gun then leaves after demanding that no one leaves until dawn.

A man bursts in with the news that lunatics have escaped from the asylum and ten pounds per head is offered for their capture. A body appears which all are convinced is the ghost of Sturdy.

In the morning, Sturdy, Rose and Rogan confront each other. Sturdy explains he was not trying to kill Rogan but to get his permission to marry Rose, who is Sturdy's sister, and end a family feud. Rogan says he was the body, having fallen from the loft while hiding from Sturdy.

Dr Glass arrives to claim Ralph and Joan who are lunatics. Mr Moon's two friends arrive and claim they hired an actor to pretend to be a ghost for Moon.

Two tramps are left by themselves with Ralph's wallet which turns out to be stuffed with newspapers.

== Cast ==
The Herald 24 November 1931

- Donalda Warne as Joan
- John Maitland as Ralph
- Phil Smith as John Moon
- Ed Brett
- Thelma Scott
- George Edwards
- Royce Milton
- Ronald Atholwood
- John Cameron as Captain Sturdy
- Willie Driscoll
- Norman Shepherd
- Keith Desmond as swagman

== Production ==
The movie was part of Efftee's initial slate of productions.

Donalda Warne (1912-??) made her cinema debut in the film. Keith Desmond was a vaudeville star.

== Banning ==
The film was banned in Victoria for children between six and sixteen on the grounds that the sound of the wind in the film as well as the title of the film made the film too scary for children.

Thring appealed the decision and succeeded in having it overturned in November 1931.

== Release ==
The movie was released as a supporting feature for Diggers.

=== Critical ===
The Sun News said "There is some good acting by Phil Smith. The rest of the cast is fairly competent, but has little chance to distinguish itself."

The Herald said "those who expected to receive an occult thrill and tingling of the blood from this picture were disappointed. The deepest mystery about it Is why the censor thought this mystery comedy should be banned."

The Bulletin said the film "has some amusing situations, the photography is up-to-date and the acting, especially that of Phil Smith, is excellent."

The trade paper Everyone's stated the film:

Cannot befaulted on the score of sound and photography. There is, in fact, a surprising quality in that respect...The picture is an interesting and humorous story... Sound and lighting effects are excellent; and convincing performances are supplied by the entire cast. None of them looks ill at ease, or appears to suffer from camera scare.

Filmink magazine, in a more recent review, declared:

The film feels like a one act play for a community group – there’s a huge cast, lots of opportunities for hammy acting. It’s in that comedy old dark house vein of Seven Keys to Baldpate... An actual murderer or robber among the characters would have made things so much better. The sound of the wind outside is effective... The Haunted Barn isn’t very good, but we’ve got to say that we quite enjoyed it. It’s just so hammy and dumb and keen to entertain.

=== Box office ===
The film and Diggers proved very popular at the box office.

== See also ==
- Cinema of Australia

== Notes ==
- Fitzpatrick, Peter, The Two Frank Thrings, Monash University 2012
