= The White Cockade (radio serial) =

1945 Australian radio serial

The White Cockade is a 1945 Australian radio serial written by Betty Roland for the George Edwards Players. The fifteen minute episodes aired each Monday, Tuesday, Wednesday, and Thursday at 7.30 p.m. The play concerned Bonnie Prince Charlie.

The serial was one of a number of historical romances produced by the George Edwards Players, others including Out of the Darkness and The Man in the Iron Mask.

The production was popular and it was revived in 1952.
