= Efftee Studios =

Australian film and theatre production studio

Efftee Studios was an early Australian film and theatre production studio, established by F.W. Thring (the name 'Efftee' deriving from his initials, 'FT' for Francis Thring) in 1930. It existed until Thring's death in 1935. Initially Efftee Films was based in Melbourne and used optical sound equipment imported from the US.

== History ==
In 1931, the company produced the first commercially viable Australian made sound feature film, Diggers. Over the next five years, Efftee produced nine features, over 80 shorts and several stage productions, including the Australian musicals Collits' Inn (1933) and The Cedar Tree (1934). Notable collaborators include C. J. Dennis, George Wallace and Frank Harvey.

In 1934, Thring suspended Efftee's operations to pressure the government to establish a quota for Australian films, threatening to move production to London. He relocated production to Sydney to take advantage of the New South Wales Cinematograph Films (Australian Quota) Act 1935.

Efftee was also the first operator of Melbourne radio station 3XY which began broadcasting on 9 September 1935.

Thring traveled to Hollywood in March 1936 to look for scriptwriters and actors and returned in June but died soon after.

Founder F.W. Thring was the father of the Australian and international actor, Frank Thring.

== Selected filmography ==
=== Features ===
- A Co-respondent's Course (1931)
- Diggers (1931)
- The Haunted Barn (1931)
- The Sentimental Bloke (1932)
- His Royal Highness (1932)
- Harmony Row (1933)
- A Ticket in Tatts (1934)
- Sheepmates (1934) – abandoned during filming
- The Streets of London (1934)
- Clara Gibbings (1934)

=== Non-Efftee features shot in the Efftee Studio ===
- Diggers in Blighty (1933)
- Waltzing Matilda (1933)
- Heritage (1935)

=== The 'Efftee Entertainers' Variety Shorts ===
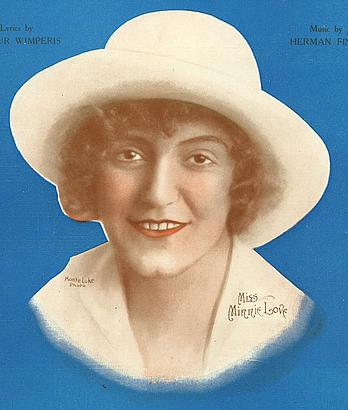
Actress Minnie Love, circa 1914

- Will Cade and his Regent Theatre Orchestra in Selections from 'The Desert Song' (1931)
- Jack O'Hagan – Vocalist Composer (1931) – with Jack O'Hagan
- Cecil Parkes' Strad Trio in Selections from Their Repertoire (1931)
- Athol Tier as Napoleon (1931)
- Keith Desmond in Recitations (No. 1) (1931)
- Keith Desmond in Recitations (No. 2) (1931)
- George Wallace, Australia's Premier Comedian (1931) – with George Wallace
- Melody and Terpsichor (1931)
- Stan Ray and George Moon Jnr, Speciality Dancers (No. 1) (1931)
- Stan Ray and George Moon Jnr, Speciality Dancers (No. 2) (1931)
- Melbourne's Chinese Orchestra in Selections (1931)
- Minnie Love in Impressions of Famous Artists (No. 1) (1931)
- Minnie Love in Impressions of Famous Artists (No. 2) (1931)
- Minnie Love in Impressions of Famous Artists (No. 3) (1931)
- The Sundowners – Harmony Quartette (No. 1) (1932)
- The Sundowners – Harmony Quartette (No. 2) (1932)
- Lou Vernon – Character Songs (No. 1) (1932)
- Kathleen Goodall – Songs at the Piano (No. 1) (1932)
- Kathleen Goodall – Songs at the Piano (No. 2) (1932)
- Kathleen Goodall – Songs at the Piano (No. 3) (1932)
- Peter Bornstein, Celebrated Violinist (1932)
- George White (1932)
- Miss Ada Reeve – Comedienne (No. 1) (1932) – with Ada Reeve
- Miss Ada Reeve – Comedienne (No. 2) (1932)
- Miss Byrl Walkley, Soprano (1932)
- Somewhere South of Shanghai, Rendered by Marshall Crosby (1932)
- Neil McKay, Scottish Comedian (1932) – with Neil McKay
- Williamson Imperial Grand Opera Co. Orchestra – Overture from Carmen, by Bizet (1932)
- Williamson Imperial Grand Opera Co. Orchestra – Overture from Gounod's Faust (1932)
- Williamson Imperial Grand Opera Co. Orchestra – Selections from the Barber of Seville by Rossini (1932)
- Signor Apollo Granforte and the Williamson Imperial Grand opera Company Orchestra (1932)
- Lou Vernon – Character Songs (No. 2) (1932)

=== Two-Reel Efftee shorts ===
- Oh, What a Night! (1932) – 14-minute short starring George Wallace
- In the Future (1933) – 12-minute short

== Theatre shows ==
- Collit's Inn (1933)
- The Beloved Vagabond (1934) – done in Melbourne
- Mother of Pearl (1934) – done in Melbourne
- Her Past (1934)
- Jolly Roger (1934)
- Children in Uniform (1934)
- S.S. Sunshine (1935)
- The Cedar Tree (1934)
- Crazy Nights Revue (1935)
- The Oojah Bird (1935)
- Rope (1934)
- Streets of London (1933) – later filmed
- Clara Gibbings (1933) – later filmed

== Unmade films ==
- adaptation of Ginger Murdoch, a book by William Hatfield, but it never eventuated
- adaptation of Collitt's Inn
- adaptation of the book James! Don't Be a Fool by E. V. Timms with an adaptation by John P. McLeod
- adaptation of John P. McLeod's book Along the Road with a script to be done by McLeod
- A Sweepin' the Deep with George Wallace
- adaptation of Redheap by Norman Lindsay – £1,000 reportedly paid for the rights
- Typhoon Treasure – later made by others
- adaptation of Robbery Under Arms as a stage musical then a film

== See also ==
- Cinema of Australia

== Sources ==
- Efftee Film Productions at National Film and Sound Archive
- Chris Long, 'The Efftee Legacy', Cinema Papers, December 1982 p 521
- Efftee theatre productions at AusStage
- Efftee Entertainers at Oz Movies
- Efftee's Australia at Oz Movies
- Efftee Entertainers at Australian Variety Theatre Archive
