= Spur of the Moment (film) =

1931 film

- Directed by: A. R. Harwood
- Written by: A. R. Harwood
- Story by: Betty Davies
- Produced by: A. R. Harwood
- Starring: James Alexander
- Cinematography: Leslie McCallum; Ed Eintle
- Production company: A. R. Harwood Talkie Productions
- Release date: 26 September 1931
- Running time: 50 minutes
- Country: Australia

Spur of the Moment is a 1931 Australian film directed by A. R. Harwood. It was one of the first Australian talking movies.

== Plot ==
A wealthy socialite, Claire Rutherford (Beatrice Touzeau), visits her former lover, Tony Iredale (James Alexander), one night. The next day Tony is arrested for the murder of a bookmaker the night before. In order to protect Claire's reputation, Tony remains silent. However a Scotland Yard detective in Melbourne on holiday (William Green) manages to trap the killer.

== Production ==
Harwood had attempted to make Australia's first talking movie, Out of the Shadows in 1931 but been unable to complete it. However he managed to secure backing from a Melbourne businessman to fund two low-budget films, this and Isle of Intrigue (1931) made in an old factory at 61 Stanley St West Melbourne which had been converted into a sound studio.

The story was written by Melbourne playwright Betty Roland using the name "Betty Davies". Filming began in June 1931 after a rehearsal period.

== Reception ==
A contemporary review said the script "leaves several matters unexplained, and the eventual confession of the murderer is scarcely convincing... [it] depends almost entirely upon dialogue, and scarcely at all upon action."

The cast included Helene Best, daughter of Australian politician, Sir Robert Best.

== Cast ==
- James Alexander as Anthony Iredale
- William Green as Inspector Perry
- Guy Hastings as Chief of C.I.B.
- Darcy Kelway as Joe
- Syd Hollister as Alf
- Fred Patey as Pop
- Charles Bradley as Rutherford
- William Ralston as Burton
- Norman Balmer as Noble
- Russell Cramer as Detective
- Herb Moylan as Clerk of Courts
- Helene Best
