= A. R. Harwood =

Australian film director and producer

Alexander Roy "Dick" Harwood (1897–1980) was an Australian film director and producer who also worked in exhibition. He was inspired to become a filmmaker when he was posted to Tahiti to work for an insurance company and watched the shooting of Never the Twain Shall Meet (1925). He returned to Australia and produced and directed The Man Who Forgot (1927).

Harwood went on to make a number of feature films over the next twenty years.

Film historians Andrew Pike and Ross Cooper said of him that "what Harwood lacked in talent as a director, he made up for in perseverance, usually in the face of formidable shortages of finance and equipment."

He also worked as an insurance broker, real estate agent, theatre manager and chief executive for the Miss Australia Quest.

Harwood was married with one daughter.

== Credits ==
- The Man Who Forgot (1927) – feature
- Out of the Shadows (1931) – unfinished feature
- Spur of the Moment (1931) – feature
- Isle of Intrigue (1931) – feature
- Secret of the Skies (1934) – feature
- Something Different (1934) – musical variety show
- Pearl Lust (1936) – feature for home movie market
- The Avenger (1937) – feature
- Show Business (1938) – feature
- Night Club (1952) – feature
