= Frank Thring =

Australian character actor (1926–1994)

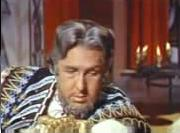
- Thring on the set of King of Kings in 1961
- Born: Francis William Thring; 11 May 1926; Melbourne, Victoria, Australia
- Died: 29 December 1994 (aged 68); Melbourne, Victoria, Australia
- Other name: William Francis Thring IV
- Occupations: Actor, theatre director
- Years active: 1941–1993
- Spouse: Joan Cunliffe (divorced)
- Father: F.W. Thring

Francis William Thring IV (11 May 1926 – 29 December 1994) was an Australian character actor in radio, stage, television and film; as well as a theatre director. His early career started in London in theatre productions, before he starred in Hollywood film, where he became best known for roles in Ben-Hur in 1959 and King of Kings in 1961. He was known for always wearing black and styling his home in black decor.

== Early life ==
Thring was born in Melbourne. Although sometimes referred to as Frank Thring Jr. because of his well-known father, F. W. Thring, he was actually Francis William Thring (or William Francis Thring) IV. His forebears were Francis William Thring (1812–1887), Francis William Thring (known as William Thring) (1858–1920); William Frank Thring, known as Francis William Thring or F. W. Thring, (1882–1936). (Note: F. W. Thring (1812–1887), actually had two sons, both of whom were given their father's name. The first of these was illegitimate, but the second was born after his marriage, and the Thring line continued through the legitimate son.)

Thring was the son of F. W. Thring and Olive (née Kreitmeyer), and was educated at the Melbourne Grammar School. His father was the head of the theatrical firm J. C. Williamson's in the 1920s, and subsequently founded the theatre film production studio Efftee Studios in the 1930s, in Melbourne, Australia. He has been anachronistically claimed to have been the inventor of the clapperboard. Thring Sr. was also a noted film producer (The Sentimental Bloke), and partner in the nationwide Australian theatre circuit Hoyts. Thring Sr. died in July 1936 at the age of 53, when Frank Jr. was 10 years old. His second wife (Frank Jr.'s mother) inherited all the businesses. Frank said his earliest memory is of his mother standing on a stepladder in the foyer of the Regent Theatre in Melbourne, and arranging gladioli in the vases attached to the pillars.

== Career ==
Thring’s career spanned more than 45 years, much of it spent alternating between stage, film and television. Perhaps his most famous roles were that of Pontius Pilate in Ben-Hur (1959) and Herod Antipas in King of Kings (1961).

=== Radio ===
Thring's family operated Melbourne radio station 3XY, from the opening of the station in 1935. He commenced working at 3XY as both a thespian and radio announcer in 1941, as a young man of 15. His numerous jobs at the microphone included being Uncle Frankie in the children's session. When Thring Sr died in 1936 (see above), Thring Jr.'s mother inherited the businesses. However, Thring Jr. incorrectly told people that he owned 3XY.

=== Stage ===
He began acting in professional stage roles after his discharge from the Royal Australian Air Force in 1945. He was memorable as Herod in Irene Mitchell's production of Oscar Wilde's Salome at Melbourne's Arrow Theatre in 1951, and made his British theatrical debut in the same part in 1954. Two years later, he played Sir Lancelot Spratt in Doctor in the House, which ran for 240 performances at the Victoria Palace in London.

He was Saturninus in the Royal Shakespeare Theatre production of Titus Andronicus with Laurence Olivier, Vivien Leigh and Anthony Quayle. He also played Captain Hook opposite Peggy Cummins' Peter Pan. Among his other acclaimed stage roles were George Bernard Shaw's Arms and the Man, Captain Ahab in Orson Welles's Moby-Dick, Falstaff in Henry IV, Part 1, and Bertolt Brecht's Life of Galileo. Another stage role was in the musical Robert and Elizabeth opposite June Bronhill and Denis Quilley.

Later in life he returned to the stage playing both butlers in the Melbourne Theatre Company's production of The Importance of Being Earnest in 1988. His final stage appearance was in Humorists Read the Humorists at the Melbourne International Comedy Festival in 1992.

=== Film ===
Thring first appeared on screen as a child in the 1932 Australian film The Sentimental Bloke, directed by his father F. W. Thring. One of Thring's most well-known screen roles was as Pontius Pilate in Ben-Hur (1959). He also appeared as Al-Kadir, Emir of Valencia in El Cid (1961). Thring was also awarded the Erik Kuttner Award for Acting (1965). In addition to these roles, Thring played a barrister in The Case of Mrs. Loring (1958), the usurping king Aella (Ælla of Northumbria) in The Vikings (1958) and Herod Antipas in King of Kings (1961). Thring is the only actor to portray on film both of the historical figures directly responsible for authorizing the crucifixion of Christ according to the Gospels. He played numerous glowering bad guys in Hollywood epics of the 1950s and 1960s. Back in Australia, he starred opposite James Mason and a young Helen Mirren in Michael Powell's film Age of Consent (1969), and appeared in two biographical films about famous bushrangers: Ned Kelly (1970) and Mad Dog Morgan (1976). He played suave gangsters in Alvin Rides Again (1974) and The Man from Hong Kong (1975). In his later years, his screen roles included the devilish Collector in Mad Max Beyond Thunderdome (1985), and a comedic role as an Alfred Hitchcock-like film director in the horror movie spoof, Howling III (1987).

=== Television ===
Thring's television credits include the Australian miniseries Against the Wind and Bodyline. He was also the recurring villain Doctor Stark who would use mischievous means in attempts to steal Skippy and other animals out of Waratah National Park in several episodes of Skippy the Bush Kangaroo. He also acted in commercials, particularly one in which he would glare at the camera saying "You do have your television licence. Don't you?".

He had the lead roles in the 1959 ABC TV play Treason, and the 1962 ABC play Light Me a Lucifer.

== Personal life ==
Off-screen, Thring was known for his flamboyant, often waspish, persona. He was featured in numerous TV commercials and guest-starring roles on popular weekly series, variety programs and quiz shows, often dressed in black funereal attire and other sinister costumes - the interior of his house was featured in an Australian TV program and the walls were also black. However, his acting career was interrupted by bouts of alcoholism and periods of ill health.

Thring was appointed 1982's King of the Melbourne Moomba Festival. A reviewer wrote of Thring, "this doyenne [sic] of film and theatre looked nothing short of majestic in his regal garb and riding on a thespian-inspired float".

Thring was briefly married to actress Joan Cunliffe during the 1950s. The marriage ended in divorce. Cunliffe lived in London and was manager of both Rudolf Nureyev and Margot Fonteyn. Thring was flamboyantly gay, but he wanted children and was greatly distressed when his marriage ended without issue.

On 29 December 1994, Thring died from esophageal cancer, aged 68. He was cremated and his ashes scattered off the coast of Queenscliff, Victoria. A celebration of his life was held at the Victorian Arts Centre, Melbourne, in 1995.

== Filmography ==
- The Vikings (1958) – Aella
- A Question of Adultery (1958) – Mr. Stanley
- The Flaming Sword (1958) – Gar
- Dick and the Duchess – "The Courtroom" (1958 TV series) – Wembler
- Treason (1959) – Karl Albrecht
- Ben Hur (1959) – Pontius Pilate
- This Is Television (1960) - as himself
- King of Kings (1961) – Herod Antipas
- El Cid (1961) – Al Kadir
- Light Me a Lucifer (1962, TV Movie) – The Devil
- Photo Finish (1965 TV movie) – Sam Kinsale
- Hey You! – "The Soup Kitchen" (1967 TV series) – Mr Goodly
- Australian Playhouse – "The Heat's On" (1967 TV series) – Mr Paisley
- Skippy the Bush Kangaroo – "Double Trouble"; "Trapped"; "Long Way Home" (1967 TV series) – Dr Stark
- Salome (1968) – Herod
- Age of Consent (1969) – Godfrey
- Delta – The Initiates (1969 TV series) – Dr Spencer
- The Link Men – "See Amsterdam and Die" (1970 TV series) – Bruce Crane
- Ned Kelly (1970) – Judge Barry
- The Man Who Shot the Albatross (1970 TV Movie) – Judge Atkins
- Alvin Rides Again (1974) – Fingers
- The Cherry Orchard (1974 TV movie)
- The Man from Hong Kong (1975) – Willard
- Mad Dog Morgan (1976) – Superintendent Cobham
- Up The Convicts (1976 TV series) – Sgt Bastion
- The Importance of Keeping Perfectly Still (1977 short film)
- Against the Wind – "The Seeds of Fire"; "The Wild Goose" (1978 TV mini-series) – Magistrate
- Outbreak of Love (1981 TV mini-series) – Arthur Langton
- At Last... Bullamakanka: The Motion Picture (1983) – TV Producer
- Eureka Stockade (1984 TV mini-series) – Judge
- Bodyline – Episode 1.1 (1984 TV mini-series) – Lord Harris
- Mad Max Beyond Thunderdome (1985) – The Collector
- Death of a Soldier (1986) – Religious speaker
- The Steam-Driven Adventures of Riverboat Bill (1986) – voice
- Howling III (1987) – Jack Citron
- The Devil in Evening Dress (1987) – Host
- Mission: Impossible – "Bayou" (1989 TV series) – Jake Morgan
- Hercules Returns (1993) – Zeus (voice) (final film role)
