= The Sentimental Bloke (1932 film) =

1932 film

- Directed by: F. W. Thring
- Written by: C. J. Dennis
- Based on: Songs of a Sentimental Bloke by C. J. Dennis
- Produced by: F. W. Thring
- Starring: Cecil Scott; Ray Fisher
- Cinematography: Arthur Higgins
- Production company: Efftee Film Productions
- Distributed by: Universal
- Release date: 26 March 1932
- Running time: 92 mins
- Country: Australia
- Language: English
- Budget: £20,000 or £12,000
- Box office: £22,000

The Sentimental Bloke is a 1932 Australian film directed by F. W. Thring and starring Cecil Scott and Ray Fisher. It is an adaptation of the 1915 novel Songs of a Sentimental Bloke by C. J. Dennis, which had previously been filmed in 1919.

== Premise ==
A larrikin is reformed due to the love of a good woman.

== Cast ==
- Cecil Scott as the Bloke
- Ray Fisher as Doreen
- Tal Ordell as Ginger Mick
- Athol Tier as Artie
- Edna Morecombe as Effie
- Keith Desmond as Uncle
- Dora Mostyn as Ma
- William Carroll as the Stror at Coot
- Leslie Gordon as Erb
- Katie Towers
- William Ralston
- Barney Egan

== Production ==
Dennis was hired to adapt his own story. Dialogue was rewritten by Dennis in prose and updated to the modern era. It placed greater emphasis on supporting characters than the 1919 film, adding a detective plot about Uncle Jim being conned over his discovery of gold in his orchard.

The female lead, Ray Fisher, was signed by Thring to a five-year contract. She later married champion jockey Billy Cook.

Raymond Longford later claimed he worked on the film as an associate. According to Jack Murray, assistant to cinematographer Arthur Higgins, Thing was a director in name only and the real director was Higgins. It was Efftee's most expensive film.

== Reception ==
The film ran for five weeks at a cinema in Melbourne. Thring later estimated the film earned £2,000 at one theatre alone and it was the third most popular Australian movie of the year after On Our Selection and The Squatter's Daughter.

Variety called it 'undoubtedly the best Australian production yet made".

Thring claimed in the long run he lost £5,000 on the movie due in part because of studio overhead.

The film was released in England but received poor reviews.

== See also ==
- Cinema of Australia
