= The Magic Shoes (1935 film) =

1935 Australian short film

- Directed by: Claude Flemming
- Written by: Peggy Graham
- Based on: the fairy tale Cinderella
- Produced by: Frederick Davies
- Starring: Peter Finch
- Cinematography: Mel Nichols
- Production company: Pacific Productions
- Release date: 1935
- Country: Australia
- Language: English

The Magic Shoes is a 1935 Australian short film based on the fairy tale Cinderella. It features the first screen performance by Peter Finch and Helen Hughes, daughter of former Prime Minister William Hughes and was the first dramatised movie to be shot at the National Studios, built to make The Flying Doctor (1936).

Today The Magic Shoes is considered a lost film. However 33 production and publicity stills relating to the film were discovered in 2006.

== Premise ==
A "pantomime fantasy".

== Cast ==
- Peter Finch as Prince Charming
- Gloria Gotch
- Helen Hughes
- Norman French
- Sheilah Parry as The Fairy Princess
- Andrew Higginson as The Policeman
- Phil Smith
- Peter Dawson as The Equerry
- Bertie Wright as The Jester
- George Hurt
- Carleton Stuart

== Production ==
It was the first production from Pacific Productions. This was a new company capitalised at £10,000 headed by George Wirth, a wealthy circus personality, which wanted to focus on making shorts.

The crew included future war photographer Damien Parer and among the cast were Phil Smith, father of actor Mona Barrie; Peter Dawson, a New Zealand comedian, dancer and eccentric dancer; Helen Hughes, daughter of Billy Hughe; Peter Finch; and a number of children who were students at an acting school run by director Claude Flemming with Frank Harvey.

Filming finished by November 1935. It was originally scheduled for 11 days and finished in eight.

Editing was completed the following month.

== Reception ==
The film failed to find a distributor and was not a financial success.

== See also ==
- List of lost films
