= Noel Monkman =

New Zealand born Australian filmmaker specialising in underwater photography

- Born: 1896
- Died: 1969 (aged 72–73)
- Occupations: Filmmaker, underwater photographer

Noel Monkman (1896–1969) was an Australian filmmaker, born in New Zealand, best known for specialising in underwater photography. He was a press photographer in New Zealand before moving to Australia and joining the Orpheum Theatre orchestra.

== Early life ==
Monkman was born in Dunedin on January 1st, 1896. His parents divorced when he was 5 and he lived with his father in Moeraki. He became fascinated with the sea creatures he saw on the beach and began studying them with home made lenses consisting of jars of water. Eventually he purchased a microscope and later was gifted a camera.

Monkman trained as a cellist and began performing with the J.C. William Theatrical company. He enlisted in the New Zealand Army Expeditionary Force in 1917 and spent 3 months serving on board the hospital ship Mareno in 1918. Upon returning to New Zealand, he joined another theatre company where he met pianist Kitty Gelhor. Together they moved to Australia where they played in Sydney orchestras for the next 15 years.

== Film Career ==
Monkman pursued his interest in film and marine biology throughout his time as a professional musician and was among the first people to take up diving in Australia. He made short films on invertebrates which eventually came to the attention of Fox-Movitone News, which began using his footage in newsreels in 1930. After seeing his work, Frank Thring entered into a partnership with Monkman called Australian Educational Films Pty. Ltd. The Monkmans then converted a van into a camper and mobile film lab so they could travel and produce new material. They worked extensively in the Great Barrier Reef, producing the first ever footage of coral polyps feeding on plankton.

After producing several short documentaries through the 1930s, Monkman wrote and directed the feature films Typhoon Treasure (1939) and The Power and the Glory (1941). Filmink argued "Had the [1935 film] quota been enforced, Noel Monkman would have become a significant feature director of adventure movies – he and his wife still had a fine career, but it’s not what it could and should have been."

After the war, he returned to documentary film making, with some of his footage featured in the Oscar winning Rachel Carson film The Sea Around Us in 1953. In 1954, he was director of cinematography on the Chips Rafferty film King of the Coral Sea..

Noel and Kitty began operating on Green Island in 1930 and moved there permanently in 1956 where they established a theatre to screen their work.

== Honours ==
Monkman was named a Fellow of the Royal Microscopical Society in 1948, and an Associate of the Australian Cinematographers Society. Monkman died on May 1st, 1969 at the age of 73. His ashes were scattered on Green Island reef, where a monument was erected in his memory.

== Selected filmography ==
- Secrets of the Sea (1931) - director (documentary)
- The Cliff Dwellers (1932) - director (documentary)
- Coral and its Creatures (1932) - director (documentary)
- Typhoon Treasure (1938) – writer, director
- The Power and the Glory (1941) – writer, director
- Marvels of Miniature (1950) - documentary
- King of the Coral Sea (1954) – underwater photography
- Deep Down Under (1956) - director (TV documentary)
- Coral Kingdom (1958) – director

== Writings ==
- Escape to Adventure (1956)
- From Queensland to the Great Barrier Reef : a naturalist's adventures in Australia (1958)
- Quest for the Curly-Tailed Horses (1962) - autobiography
