= Waltzing Matilda (1933 film) =

- Directed by: Pat Hanna associate Raymond Longford
- Written by: Pat Hanna; John P. McLeod; George Breston
- Produced by: Pat Hanna
- Starring: Pat Hanna; Coral Browne
- Cinematography: Arthur Higgins
- Production company: Pat Hanna Productions
- Distributed by: Universal Pictures
- Release date: 2 December 1933
- Running time: 77 mins
- Country: Australia
- Language: English
- Budget
- Box office: £8,000

Waltzing Matilda is a 1933 Australian film directed by and starring Pat Hanna. It features Coral Browne.

== Plot ==
Chic Williams and his friend James Brown wrongly believe they have injured a policeman in a drunken fight. Fleeing a private detective who is following them, they head for the bush.

Chic and James find work as drovers at Banjaroo Station, where his old army mate Joe works as an overseer. James falls in love with the station owner's daughter. The detective arrives and tells James he has inherited money. James and his girlfriend announce their engagement and Chic sets off alone as a swagman, accompanied by a chorus of "Waltzing Matilda".

== Cast ==
- Pat Hanna as Chic Williams
- Joe Valli as Joe McTavish
- Frield Fisher as Albert
- Coral Browne
- Norman French as James Brown
- Joan Lang
- Nellie Mortyne
- Dorothy Parnham as Dorothy Young
- George Moon
- Bill Innes

== Production ==
Pat Hanna held a competition for the name of the film. A prize of £10 was shared amongst the 20 people who suggested "Waltzing Matilda".

The character of Chic William was well established on stage and in Pat Hanna's previous movies but changed for this film- he is poor, drinking heavily and drifting from job to job.

The movie was shot at Efftee Studios in Melbourne in mid 1933.

The film reportedly had twice the budget of Diggers in Blighty.

The romantic male lead, Norman French, was a casting director for Efftee and Hanna.

== Reception ==
The film only ran for a short time in the cities but enjoyed more popularity in the country. Reviews were mixed. It was classified as a "middle grade" success at the box office.

Hanna was frustrated at the financial return he was getting for his efforts and this was his last film. However, in 1950 he said he was still making money by re-releasing his films.
