= F. W. Thring =

Australian film director (1882–1936)

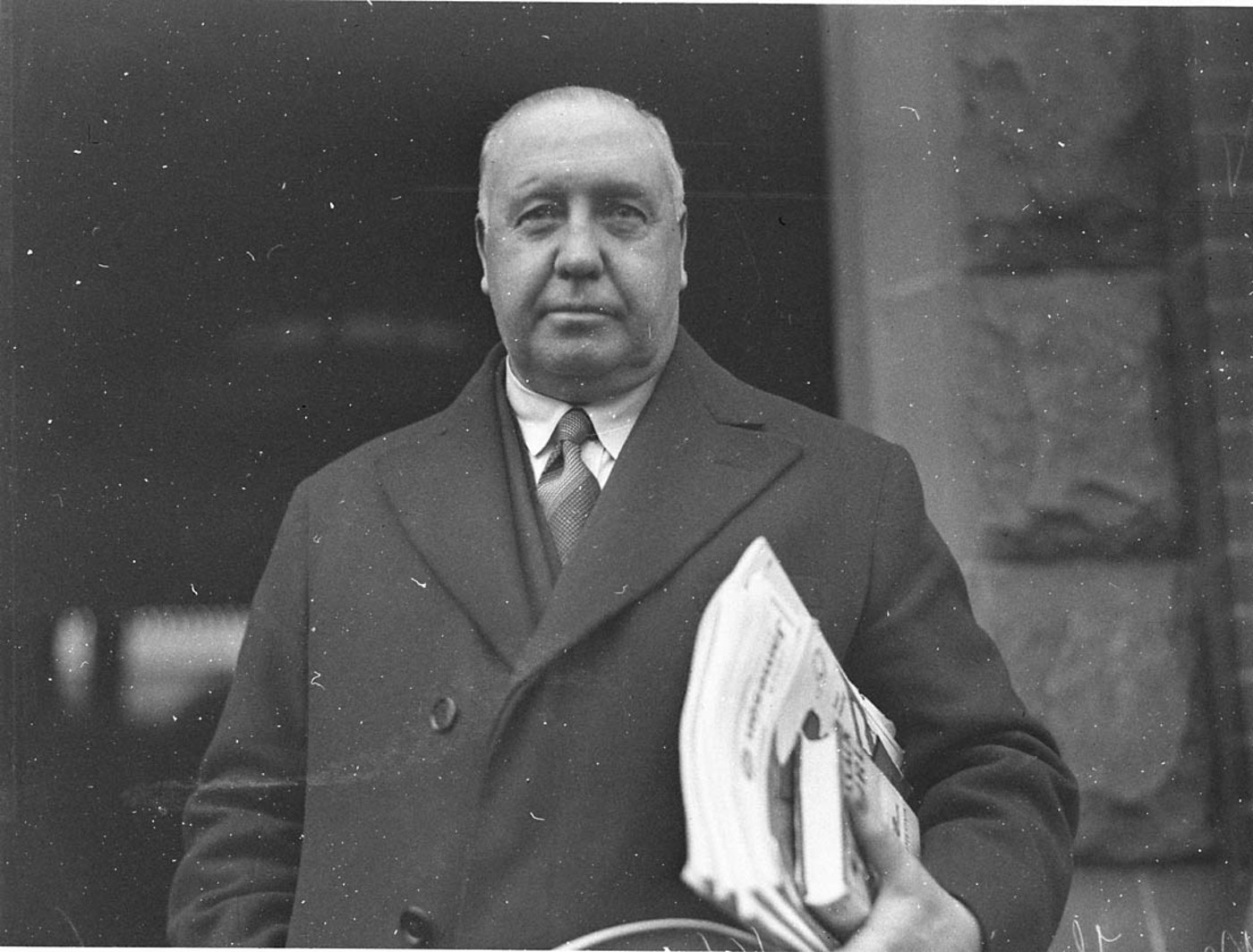
- Born: William Francis Thring; 2 December 1882; Wentworth, New South Wales, Australia
- Died: 1 July 1936 (aged 53); East Melbourne, Victoria, Australia
- Resting place: Burwood Cemetery
- Other names: Francis William III
- Occupations: Film producer; director; exhibiter; studio founder
- Years active: c. 1915–1935

Francis William Thring III (2 December 1882 – 1 July 1936) was an Australian film director, producer, and exhibitor. He has been credited with the invention of the clapperboard.

== Early life ==
Francis William Thring (or William Francis Thring) was born on 2 December 1882 in Wentworth, New South Wales, the son of a labourer, William Francis Thring, and Angelina, née McDonald.

William Thring (c. 1812 – 17 November 1887) arrived in South Australia c. 1849 from England, son of W. Thring and brother of T. Thring, both at some time mayors of Salisbury, Wiltshire. but not in List of mayors of Salisbury. He lived Middleton 1856, Port Elliott 1863, Wentworth NSW in 1885, 1887. He married Elizabeth (c. 1812 – 17 June 1885)

son F. Thring ( – )
son J. Thring ( – )
Anne Elizabeth Thring ( – ) married George L. Liptrott in 1856.
Emma Sophia Thring ( – ) married John Davie in 1863.

Although sometimes known as Frank Thring Sr, on account of well-known son Frank Thring Jr., the subject of this article is actually Francis William III. His forebears were Francis William Thring (1812–1887) and Francis William Thring(?), known as William Thring (1858–1920). F. W. Thring (1812–1887) had two sons, both of whom were given their father's name. The first of these was illegitimate, but the second one was born after his marriage, and the Thring line continued through the legitimate son.

== Career ==
Thring worked as a conjurer in the outback and as a bootmaker in Gawler, South Australia, as well as starting Biograph Pictures in Tasmania. In 1911, he became a projectionist at Kreitmayer's Waxworks in Melbourne, Victoria. He thrived in the cinema trade and opened the Paramount Theatre in 1915 and became managing director of J. C. Williamson's Films in 1918, which eventually merged to become Hoyts in 1926.

In 1928, Thring personally supervised the building of a new Hoyts picture theatre in Adelaide, the Regent Theatre.

=== Efftee film studio ===
In 1930, Thring sold his interests in Hoyts to Fox Film Corporation and went into film production, establishing Efftee Studios (based on his initials). Over the next five years, Efftee produced nine features, over 80 shorts and several stage productions, including the Australian musicals Collits' Inn and The Cedar Tree.

Notable collaborators include C. J. Dennis, George Wallace and Frank Harvey. He also made a series of films with Noel Monkman.

Thring visited Britain in 1932–33, where he sold Efftee's entire output: seven features, nine shorts and a series about the Great Barrier Reef made with Noel Monkman.

In 1932 Thring became the leader of a campaign for a quota for Australian films. In 1934, he suspended Efftee's operations, announcing that resumption would depend upon the introduction of an effective quota system in Victoria.

In 1935, Efftee obtained a licence to broadcast from the then-new broadcasting station 3XY in Melbourne, which was owned by the United Australia Party (and later the Liberal Party).

After New South Wales passed its Cinematograph Films (Australian Quota) Act 1935 in September 1935, Thring resumed production in February 1936, in Sydney, becoming chairman of directors of Mastercraft Film Corporation Ltd while remaining managing director of Efftee Film Productions. In March he sailed for Hollywood in search of scriptwriters and actors.

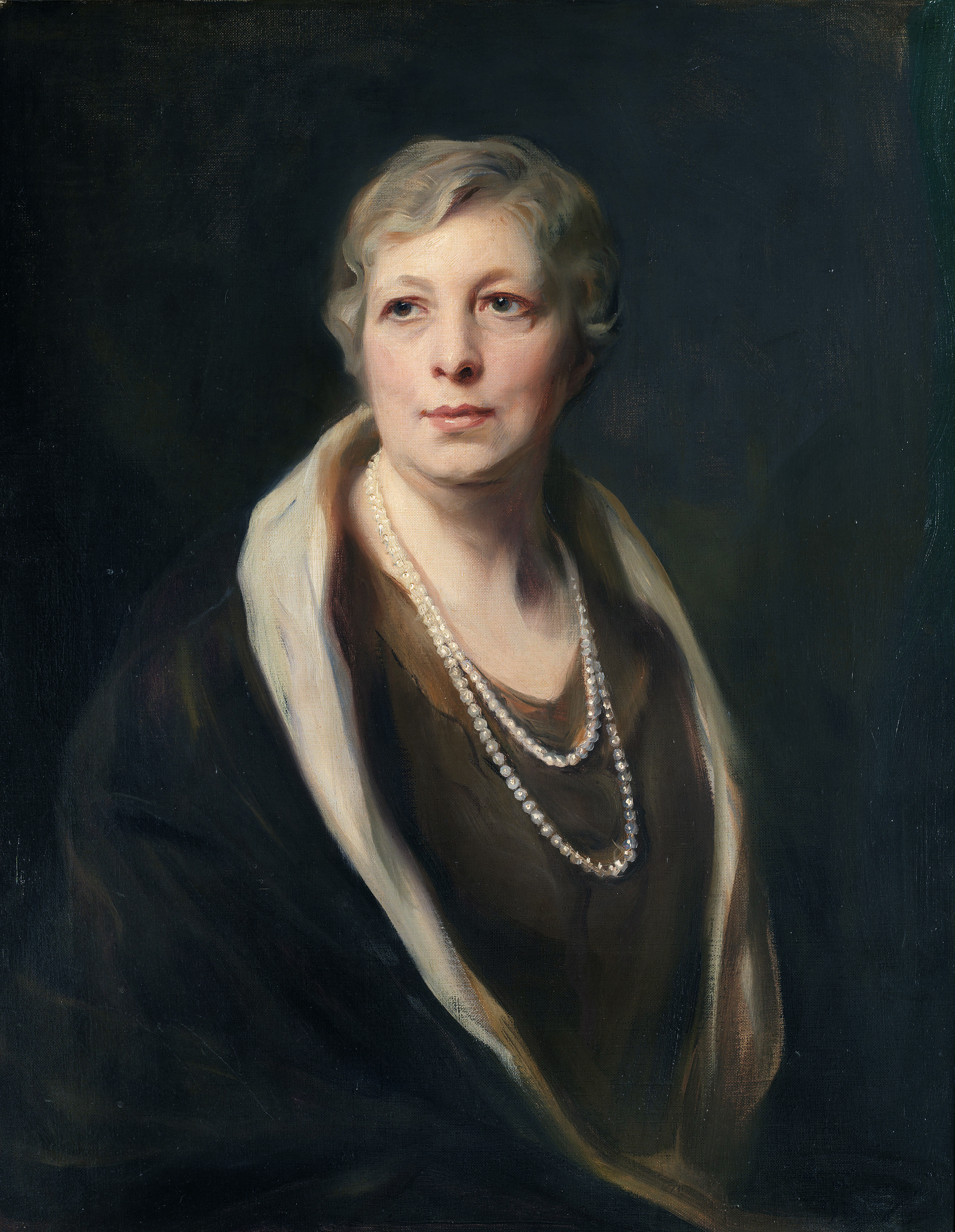
Olive Thring (Philip Alexius de Laszlo, 1933)

It was estimated Thring lost over £75,000 of his own money on his filmmaking and theatrical ventures. Filmink argued his death robbed "the Australian film industry of one of its most passionate political advocates."

== Other achievements ==
He is usually credited with the invention of the clapperboard.

== Death and family ==
Thring died of cancer on 1 July 1936, aged 53, in East Melbourne, and was buried in Burwood Cemetery. He was survived by a daughter from his first marriage to Grace Wight (Viola, known as Lola; 1911–71), his second wife, Olive, née Kreitmayer whom he had married on 25 April 1921, and their then 10-year-old son, the future actor Frank Thring.

Lola dated the future Prime Minister Harold Holt but she ultimately rejected him only to marry his divorced father, her father's business partner. Harold Holt thus acquired a step-mother who was three years his junior. Harold Holt's father, Tom Holt, was in control of Efftee Studios at this time.

== Selected filmography ==
- The Haunted Barn (1931) – short
- A Co-respondent's Course (1931) – short
- Diggers (1931)
- The Sentimental Bloke (1932)
- His Royal Highness (1932)
- Harmony Row (1933)
- A Ticket in Tatts (1934)
- Sheepmates (1934) – abandoned during shooting
- Clara Gibbings (1934)
- The Streets of London (1934)

=== Unmade films ===
- adaptation of Redheap by Norman Lindsay
- Pick and Duffers – meant to follow His Royal Highness
- adaptation of Collitt's Inn
- Ginger Murdoch from the novel by William Hatfield with George Wallace
- The Black Sheep – meant to star George Wallaca
- A Sweepin' in the Deep with George Wallace

== Selected theatre credits ==
- Clara Gibbins (August 1933) – Garrick Theatre, Melbourne
- Rope (1933)
- Collits' Inn (1933)
- The Streets of London (1933)
- Children in Uniform (1933–34) – Garrick Theatre, Melbourne with Coral Browne
- Mother of Pearl (1934)
- The Beloved Vagabond (1934)
- Jolly Roger (1934)
- The Cedar Tree (1934)
- Her Past (September 1934)
- Peter Pan (December 1934, December 1935)
- Crazy Nights Revue (1935) – with George Wallace
- S.S. Sunshine (1935)
- The Oojah Bird (1935)

== See also ==
- Cinema of Australia
