= Cinematograph Films (Australian Quota) Act 1935 =

Legislation in New South Wales, Australia

Parliament of New South Wales
- Citation: No. 41
- Enacted by: Parliament of New South Wales

Cinematograph Films (Australian Quota) Act 1935
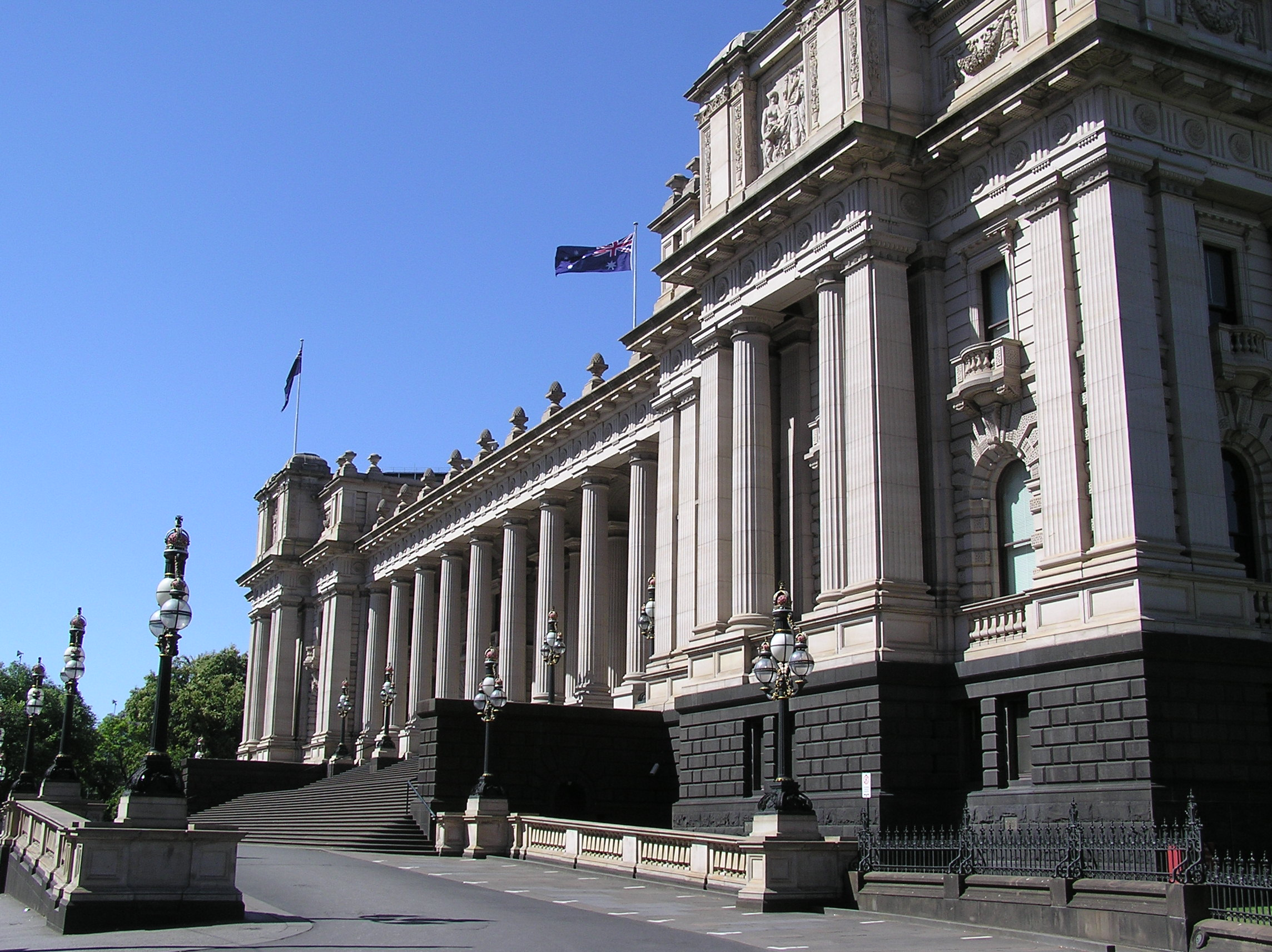

Parliament of Victoria
- Long title: An Act to provide for an Australian Film Quota and for other purposes.
- Citation: No. 4335
- Enacted by: Parliament of Victoria

The Cinematograph Films (Australian Quota) Act 1935 (No. 41) (NSW) commonly known as the Film Quota Act, long title An Act for securing the exhibition of a certain proportion of Australian cinematograph films; and for purposes connected therewith. was an act of legislation passed on 11 April 1935 that came into force on 1 January 1936.

Under the act it was compulsory that in the first year of operation five per cent, of the films distributed in New South Wales must be Australian productions, the percentage to increase yearly for five years when it becomes 15 per cent.

The act was introduced at the behest of New South Wales' Premier Bertram Stevens. The quota did inspire production of some films such as Rangle River and The Flying Doctor.

However its ultimate impact turned out to be limited due to a loophole in the legislation. The use of the word "acquire" meant it was considered that the act was drafted to reflect exhibition of films, not ensure production; distributors argued they had no obligation to produce movies. Some American distributors made veiled threats to remove Hollywood films from exhibition.

In 1937 the New South Wales government decided not to force distributors to participate in production. Similar legislation, the Cinematograph Films (Australian Quota) Act 1935 (No. 4335 (Vic)) was passed in Victoria but was never proclaimed. By the end of the decade the quota law had ceased to operate in practice.

The Quota Act has been called a "frustrating false dawn" for the Australian film industry, the "greatest ever chance" at "creating a genuinely sustainable film industry" that "withered on the vine."

== See also ==
- Screen quotas
