= 1927 in Australian literature =

This article presents a list of the historical events and publications of Australian literature during 1927.

== Books ==
- Marie Bjelke-Petersen – The Moon Minstrel
- Bernard Cronin
  - Red Dawson
  - White Gold
- Zora Cross – Sons of the Seven Mile
- James Devaney – The Currency Lass : A Tale of the Convict Days
- Mabel Forrest – Hibiscus Heart
- Mary Gaunt – Saul's Daughter
- Ion Idriess – Madman's Island
- Jack McLaren – The Chain
- Helen Simpson – Cups, Wands and Swords
- Steele Rudd – The Romance of Runnibede
- E. V. Timms
  - James! Don't Be a Fool
  - Red Mask : A Story of the Early Victorian Goldfields

== Short stories ==
- Jean Devanny – Old Savage and Other Stories
- Vernon Knowles – Silver Nutmegs
- Vance Palmer – "The Stump"
- Katharine Susannah Prichard
  - "The Cooboo"
  - "Happiness"

== Children's and Young Adult fiction ==
- W. M. Fleming – The Hunted Piccaninnies
- Lilian Turner – Nina Comes Home

== Poetry ==
- Mabel Forrest – Poems
- Mary Gilmore
  - "The Tenancy"
  - "Turn to Grass"
- Lesbia Harford
  - "Lovers Parted"
  - "This Way Only"
- Vernon Knowles – The Ripening Years
- John Shaw Neilson – New Poems
- Percival Serle, R. H. Croll & Frank Wilmot – An Australasian Anthology : Australian and New Zealand Poems
- Douglas Stewart – "Rock Carving"
- Judith Wright – "Trapped Dingo"

== Biography ==
- E. V. Timms – Lawrence, Prince of Mecca

== Drama ==
- Harry Tighe – Open Spaces

== Births ==
A list, ordered by date of birth (and, if the date is either unspecified or repeated, ordered alphabetically by surname) of births in 1927 of Australian literary figures, authors of written works or literature-related individuals follows, including year of death.

- 26 January – Grace Perry, poet, playwright and editor (died 1987)
- 25 April – Peter Yeldham, playwright and novelist (died 2022)
- 6 June – Alan Seymour, playwright (died 2015)
- 24 August – David Ireland, novelist (died 2022)
- 11 November – Jack Absalom, artist, author and adventurer (died 2019)
- 27 November – Lilith Norman, children's writer and editor (died 2017)

== Deaths ==
A list, ordered by date of death (and, if the date is either unspecified or repeated, ordered alphabetically by surname) of deaths in 1927 of Australian literary figures, authors of written works or literature-related individuals follows, including year of birth.

- 31 March – John Bernard O'Hara, poet and schoolmaster (born 1862)
- 15 April – Maybanke Anderson, author (born 1845)
- 5 July – Lesbia Harford, poet (born 1891)
- 15 August – George Gordon McCrae, poet (born 1833)
- 31 August – Lillian Pyke, children's writer and, as Erica Maxwell, novelist (born 1881)
- 13 November — James Chisholm, essayist and short story writer (born 1857)

== See also ==
- 1927 in Australia
- 1927 in literature
- 1927 in poetry
- List of years in Australian literature
- List of years in literature
