= Uncivilised (novel) =

1936 novel by Australian author E. V. Timms

- Author: E. V. Timms
- Language: English
- Genre: Novel
- Publisher: N.S.W. Bookstall Company
- Publication date: 1936
- Publication place: Australia
- Media type: Print
- Pages: 211 pp.
- Preceded by: Far Caravan
- Followed by: Maelstrom

Uncivilised is a 1936 novel by the Australian author E. V. Timms.

When published this novel was attributed to Charles Chauvel but was, in fact, written by E. V. Timms.

== Synopsis ==
Successful author Beatrice Lynn is commissioned by her publisher to go to the Outback and locate the "legendary" white man, Mara, who heads an Aboriginal Australian tribe. Travelling by camel, she is abducted by an Afghan cameleer, Akbar Jhan. He and his group of Aboriginal people provide pituri, a narcotic, to other Aboriginal people. Previously not allowed into Mara's tribal land to sell his wares, Akbar Jhan has schemed to use Beatrice, a white woman, to arouse Mara's interest.

Meanwhile, the Australian Mounted Police has its hands full with a missing inspector, an international drug ring, and a tribe of Aboriginal warriors led by Moopil who have killed two prospectors, as well as searching for the missing Beatrice.

Mara buys Beatrice from Jhan, and the two fall in love.

== Publishing history ==
After its initial publication in Australia by New South Wales Bookstall Company in 1936, it was serialised in The Land between August 1937 and February 1938.

== Film adaptation ==
The book is a novelisation of the film of the same title which was released in 1936, written and directed by Charles Chauvel. The film was released in USA in 1937 under the title Uncivilized.

== See also ==
- 1936 in Australian literature
