= Grace Gibson =

American-Australian radio entrepreneur (1905–1989)

Grace Gibson OAM
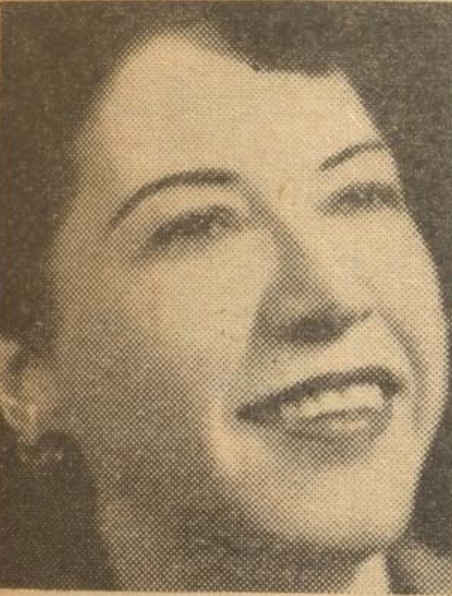
- Grace Gibson, c.1947
- Born: Grace Isabel Gibson; 17 June 1905; El Paso, Texas
- Died: 10 July 1989 (aged 84); North Buena Vista, Iowa
- Other names: Grace Atchison, Grace Parr
- Occupations: Radio executive, producer, entrepreneur

Grace Isabel Gibson (17 June 1905 – 10 July 1989), also known as Grace Atchison and Grace Parr, was an American Australian radio entrepreneur, executive and producer. She was best known for her long-running serials Dr. Paul and the local version of NBC hit Portia Faces Life.

== Early life ==
Gibson was born in El Paso, Texas, USA, in 1905 to Calvin Newton Gibson and Mexican Margaret Escobara (Schultz) and finished her schooling in California.

== Career ==
She started her career in her native US working for the Radio Transcription Company of America, as a distributor of radio programs, when recruited by Alfred Bennett, general manager of Sydney radio station 2GB, who was visiting the United States. Together they set up American Radio Transcription Agencies (later Artransa Pty Ltd), which sold American recorded radio programs throughout Australia, and Gibson moved to Sydney, Australia in 1934.

Gibson was on a buying trip in the US in 1941 when Pearl Harbor was attacked, and as a result she was prevented from returning to Australia for several years. Whilst stranded, she became manager of her former company, Radio Transcription Company of America.

In 1944 she set up her own company, Grace Gibson Radio Productions Pty. Ltd., based in Savoy House, Bligh Street, Sydney. The company would become one of the biggest producers of radio drama with broadcast productions that would air in Australia, New Zealand, South Africa, Hong Kong and Canada. Her company produced over 30,000 programs for Australian radio.

The company's first show was the documentary series Here are the Facts. That was followed by a number of popular daytime soap operas and other shows such as Doctor Paul, Portia Faces Life, Night Beat, Dossier on Dumetrius, Cattleman, I Christopher Macauley, Chickenman, Captain Kremmen, and Mr. and Mrs. North.

Gibson continued to produce radio dramas from her Australian headquarters for the South African market until as late as 1971, long after television had replaced radio as the main place to hear drama in the home in most countries. This was because South Africa was virtually the last place in the English-speaking world to introduce television.

She retired in 1978 and sold Grace Gibson Radio Productions Pty. Ltd. in the same year.

Gibson was awarded the Medal of the Order of Australia (OAM) in 1987 in recognition of her services to radio in Australia.

== Personal life ==
Gibson was three times married and died in 1989 in North Buena Vista aged 68.

== Production credits ==
=== Select radio series / plays ===
Year	Title	Notes
1944	Here are the Facts	
1949	Doctor Paul	Radio series
1949	The Bishop's Mantle	Radio series
1950s	Pepper Young's Family	Radio series
1950	Fear Stalks Behind	Radio play
1950	Rejection Slip	Radio play
1950	John Barbey & Son	Radio play
1950	One Way Street	Radio play
1950	Three Blind Mice	Radio play
1950	Blind Justice	Radio play
1950	A Matter of Time	Radio play
1950	The Luck of the Game	Radio play
1950	Two Lives for One	Radio play
1950	Power—Above All	Radio play
1950	Two Doors to Destiny	Radio play
1950	The Last Check	Radio play
1950	The Kiss of Silence	Radio play
1950	Blue – For Danger	Radio play
1950	Beyond the Border	Radio play
1950	Paid in Full	Radio play
1950	Darkness of the Mind	Radio play
1950	Time Exposure	Radio play
1950	The Man Who Lost His Name	Radio play
1950	The Verdict	Radio play
1950	The Hunter	Radio play
1950	Face to Face	Radio play
1950	Always Room at the Top	Radio play
1950	End of the Road	Radio play
1950	Overture in Two Keys	Radio play
1950	They Lied to Henry Wilson	Radio play
1950	The House in Montbleu Woods	Radio play
1950	The Man Who Wouldn't Listen	Radio play
1950	The Homecoming	Radio play
1950	Ballistics Can Lie	Radio play
1950	Circumstantial Evidence	Radio play
1950	The Story of Mary Lane	Radio series
1950	A Tale of Two Sisters	Radio play
1950	Escape Me Never	Radio series
1950	Frenchman's Creek	Radio series
1950	Theatre of Thrills	Radio play
1950–1952	Night Beat	Radio series
1951	Bird of Ill Omen	Radio play
1951	Afraid of Life	Radio play
1951	Elmer	Radio play
1951	The Perfect Alibi	Radio play
1951	Dream Girl	Radio play
1951	Auld Acquaintance	Radio play
1951	Long Shots Don't Win	Radio play
1951	My Own Sister	Radio play
1951	Accidents Do Happen	Radio play
1951	It Pays to Be Polite	Radio play
1951	Strong Hands	Radio play
1951	Blind Man's Buff	Radio play
1951	Dossier On Dumetrius	Radio series
1951	Major Keen	Radio series
1951	Dinner at Antoine's	Radio series
1951	I Spy	Radio series
1951	The Strange Life of Deacon Brodie	Radio series
1952	Mr. and Mrs. North	Radio series
1952	View Matrimony	Radio play
1952	Skeleton of the Past	Radio play
1952	Siesta in the Sun	Radio play
1952	The Coward	Radio play
1952	Curtain Call	Radio play
1952	Confession in Error	Radio play
1952	The Semblance of Death	Radio play
1952	The Pathway of the Sun	Radio series
1952	Deadly Nightshade	Radio play
1952	26 Hours	Radio play
1952	Danger in Paradise	Radio series
1952	Lady in Distress	Radio series
1952	They Were Champions	Radio series
1953	Famous Fortunes	Radio series
1953	Philip Marlowe Investigates	Radio series
1954	For the Defence	Radio series
1954	Life Can Be Beautiful	Radio series
1954	The Book Club of the Air	Radio series
1954	The Beckoning Shore	Radio series
1954	Portia Faces Life	Radio series
1956	A Stranger in Paradise	Radio play
1956	Voice of Destiny	Radio series
1957–1958	A Mask for Alexis	Radio play
1958	Knave of Hearts	Radio play
1959	Nor the Moon by Night	Radio series
1959	Two Roads to Samara	Radio play
1959	The Smell of Terror	Radio play
1959	The Guiding Light	Radio series
1962	Sara Dane	Radio series
1963	The Scarlet Frontier	Radio series
1961	Cattleman	Radio series
c. 1966–	The Passing Parade	Radio series
1966–	Chickenman	Radio series
1972	I Christopher Macauley	Radio series
1973	Clayton Place	Radio series
1973	For Infamous Conduct	Radio series
1975–	Chuck Chunder	Radio series
1976	Captain Kremmen	Radio series
1982–present	The Castlereagh Line	Radio series
1986	How Green Was My Cactus	Radio series
	The House of Gold	Radio series

=== Music shows from overseas syndicators ===
Year	Title	Notes
	Casey Kasem’s American Top 40 – The 70s and The 80s	
	Dick Clark's Rock, Roll & Remember	
	The Classics	
	American Country Country Countdown with Kix Brooks	
	Legends of Jazz	
	Backtrax 80s (& Backtrax 90s)	
	House of Blues	
	Country Giants	
	Rick Dees Weekly Top 40	New Zealand and South Pacific Islands only)
	Ryan Seacrest’s American Top 40	New Zealand and South Pacific Islands only)
