= Hills of Hate =

Hills of Hate may refer to:

- The Hills of Hate, a novel by E. V. Timms
- Hills of Hate (1921 film), an American silent Western film
- Hills of Hate (1926 film), an Australian silent film
