= John P. McLeod =

Australian writer and broadcaster

John P. McLeod (died 1965) was an Australian writer and broadcaster. For a time he was an in-house screenwriter for F.W. Thring at Efftee Studios.

He also worked for the ABC and wrote a number of humorous novels.

== Selected writings ==
- A Ticket in Tatts (1934) – screenplay
- The Nawab's Necklace; Being Case 102 from the Chronicles of Clipper and Brown, the Dumbest Detectives Ever Devised (1935) – radio play
- The Leech; Or, Detectives Don't Care, Being the Hundred and Oneth Case of Clipper and Brown, the Dumbest Detectives Ever Devised (1935) – radio play
- Typhoon Treasure (1938) – script
- Way Down South (1940)
- Funtasia Digest (1941)
- Frolics in Politics (1941)
- The Progress of Pete (1944)
- Quipster Delight (1945)
- Jester Digest (1945)
- Where Old Friends Meet (1964)

=== Unfilmed screenplays ===
It was announced that McLeod would adapt the following novels for Efftee:

- James! Don't Be a Fool by E. V. Timms
- Along the Road by McLeod
