= Dorothy Gordon (Australian actress) =

Australian actress

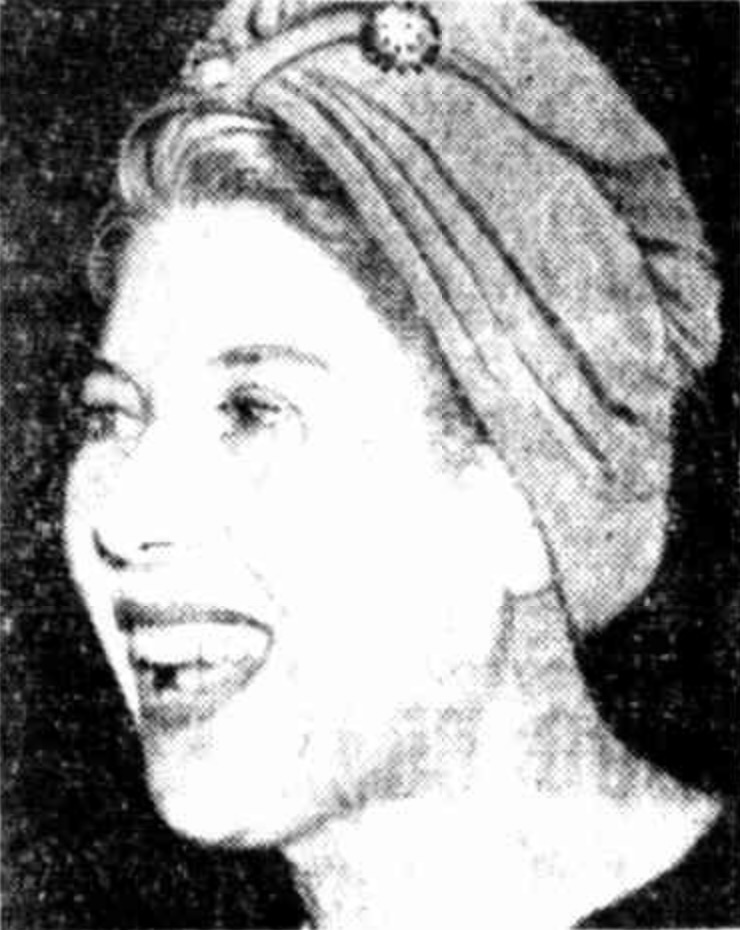
- Andrea in 1941
- Born: Dorothy Hetty Fosbery Jenner; 1 March 1891; Sydney, Australia
- Died: 24 March 1985 (aged 94); Potts Point, Sydney, Australia
- Other name: pen name Andrea
- Occupations: Actress; journalist; broadcaster; art director

Dorothy Hetty Fosbery Jenner OBE, née Gordon (1 March 1891 – 24 March 1985), also known as Dorothy Gordon, was an Australian actress, journalist, and radio broadcaster. She is best known for her long career as a newspaper columnist and radio commentator under the name Andrea. She was an actress in Hollywood and she played the lead in the Australian silent film Hills of Hate in 1926. She was a prisoner of war in Hong Kong during World War II.

== Life ==
She was born Dorothy Hetty Fosbery Gordon, in 1891. Her parents were Dora Ellen (born Fosbury) and her husband William Alexander Gordon. Her mother was born in Melbourne and her father, who was a station manager, was born in India. She enjoyed her education although the academic parts were not her main interest. She was tutored privately until they lived in Sydney when she went to local schools including the Sydney Church of England Girls' Grammar School. She had more teaching before she went to the UK where she enjoyed an indulgent social life. In 1912, she was in Melbourne, as a chorus girl in the show, Girl in a Train. She created a business making dresses in Sydney. This led to her further involvement with show business as she assisted James Cassius Williamson's company organise a show to raise funds for the war.

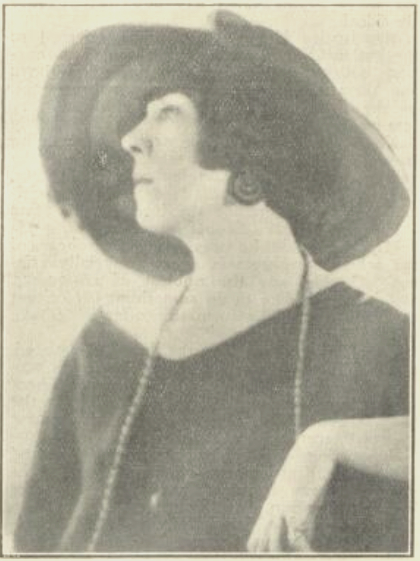
"Mrs Dorothy Gordon Jenner" c.1925, photographer, Melbourne Spurr.

In 1915 she went to Hollywood where she spent ten years taking bit parts in films—including, she later claimed, in The Sheik (1921) and in Blood and Sand (1922), both starring screen idol, Rudolf Valantino—and reviving her dressmaking skills. Not all of the claims that she later made about this period, in her 1975 biography, Darlings! I've Had a Ball! and the extracts that appeared from it in Australian Women's Weekly, in October 1975, align with known facts about the period, and there are some inconsistencies within those two sources; both date from her 84th year, five decades after the events took place. However, it is known that she was with Famous Players-Lasky, from 1916, and did take many—mainly uncredited—parts in silent era films, including work as a stunt performer. She was photographed by Hollywood photographer Melbourne Spurr.

Still from the film Hills of Hate. It was Dorothy Gordon's only lead role (1926).

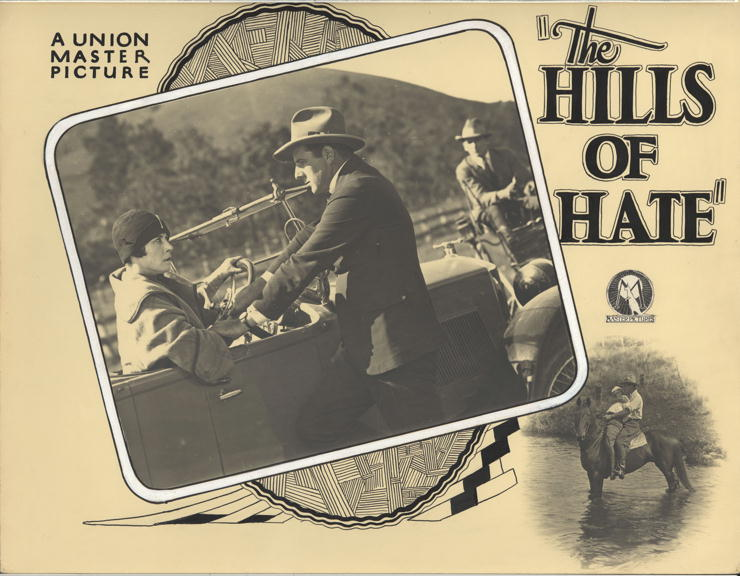
Dorothy Gordon in Hills of Hate (1926)

She had two unsuccessful marriages. The first was to Murray Eugene McEwen, whom she said enjoyed other women and alcohol. The second to George Onesiphorus Jenner was also brief. In 1925 she was back in Australia with the last name of Jenner. She played the lead in the (now lost) Australian film Hills of Hate, for director Raymond Longford, in 1926. In the following year, she was credited with art direction on the expensive Australian film For the Term of his Natural Life. She had collaborated with Longford's son, Victor Longford, on a screenplay for the film, but it was not used after the American director, Norman Dawn, took over the project. In 1927, she was in London. She survived a long illness, convalescing in Switzerland, and then took a tour of Europe.

She is best known for her long career as a columnist and radio commentator under the name Andrea. That name was chosen at random to accompany an account she wrote of observing a bullfight in Spain, while on the European tour, which she cabled to Sydney. She was using the byline by, at latest, January 1931. In 1935, using Andrea, she gave a series of four talks—one each on New York, Paris, London, and Hollywood—on Sydney radio station 2BL. She filed numerous reports from London for The Sun, during the 1930s, mostly her observations of social events and famous people, but also touching on the developing crisis prior to the outbreak of war.

In 1939 Jenner was visiting Sydney, and she was stranded there during the immediate period prior to the outbreak of the Second World War. She obtained accreditation as a correspondent for the Sun, and went to Singapore. She dispatched generally lighthearted pieces for the newspaper from Asia, during the period prior to Japan's entry into the war.

After a cocktail party given in her honour, she left Sydney again, in October 1941, for a four month stint, intending to visit various Asian cities, as an accredited war correspondent for the Sun. Her subsequent reports focused more upon the Australian military personnel and nurses, who had been sent to Singapore and the Malayan peninsula.

She was in Hong Kong at the outbreak of war with Japan. In January 1942, she was interned in the Stanley camp, in Hong Kong, by the Japanese. During internment she gained a deep voice after damaging a vocal chord, and also kept a diary written on scraps of paper, which she hid inside the sole of her shoe. Returning to Sydney, in October 1945, she persuaded her employer Associated Newspapers to pay her half wages for her four years of internment and recuperation, but invested the money in an unsuccessful business venture with her nephew, and lost the money.

She returned to journalism for different newspapers, first the Daily Telegraph (1950) and later the Truth and the Daily Mirror (1953). Her weekly column in the Daily Mirror, called "dots and dashes", appeared from late 1953 to the beginning of 1955. Well-connected to both Sydney society and the show business world, her columns were based on her own activities and opinions on current events, sprinkled with gossip and chit-chat, and much name dropping.

In 1957 and 1958, the first two whole years of television in Australia, she was a celebrity participant on the game show, 'Find the Link', on ABC Television.

About to be retired from the Daily Mirror—she reportedly later referred to the newspaper's new owner, Rupert Murdoch, as 'a rude young man'—she moved to radio. In 1958, she joined 2UE, where she first used her trademark greeting radio greeting, "Hello Mums and Dads". After she moved to 2GB, in 1963, she broadcast alongside John Pearce, and soon became labelled 'Queen of Radio'. This period was the peak of her radio career; her program was the most-listened in its time slot. However, the end of the pairing with Pearce resulted in a shattering of the previously warm relationship between the two. She never spoke to Pearce again, and he subsequently referred to her as 'The Duchess of Macquarie'. Her program was also broadcast on some stations outside Sydney, including 3AW, in Melbourne and affiliated New South Wales regional stations of the Macquarie Broadcasting Service. Market research revealed that it was her life experiences that "allowed her to transport the session into a world remote from the ordinary housewife".

From 1967, she was an early practitioner of talk-back radio in Australia. She did not adapt well to the new format, often becoming irritable with callers and criticizing her producers. Her show was pre-recorded from 1968. Her stance on politics was also out of step with changing times; a supporter of the Liberal Party of Australia, she was sued for libel by Gough Whitlam and Margaret Whitlam, and Jim Cairns, for equating the Australian Labor Party with communists. Dropped by 2GB in 1969, she briefly had a morning show on ABC. Her last radio broadcasting work was for 2CH, which dropped her show in 1972. Although she was reticent about her age, her last radio work took place in her eighty-first year.

From 1954 to 1960, she was a director of the Phillip Street Theatre, a lively theatre venue. In a show there, Gordon Chater parodied her as 'Little Lady Make Believe', but she happily played along, while insisting that the names that she dropped in her work were people she really knew.

She was made an OBE, in 1968, and contrived to have the honour presented in person by Queen Elizabeth, in London. She co-wrote her biography, Darlings I've Had a Ball!, in 1975. Her co-writer was Trish Sheppard, although it is known that at least four others were approached to be the co-author at various times, including Russell Braddon and John Pearce. Throughout her life, she was known for her immaculate grooming and the trademark beauty spot, which she had applied each morning since her time in Hollywood.

== Later life, death and legacy ==
She lived in a flat on the fifth floor of the Macleay Regis building in Potts Point, surrounded by photographs and momentos of people whom she had met over her long career. She was associated with the Wayside Chapel, at Kings Cross, which she officially opened in 1964.

In 1976, she was involved in a motor vehicle accident. The accident appeared to be so serious that The Canberra Times erroneously reported her death. She was shocked but uninjured, but the accident—at the northern end of the Iron Cove Bridge—did take the life of a motorcyclist. At the time of the accident, just after 11 p.m., she was returning from the Channel 7 television studio, where she said that she had been working on a 'new programme'.

She was still a newsworthy public identity, until her ninetieth year, when she stated that, "Age bores me stiff. I don't feel old and I don't think I look it. Inside I'm the same as I ever was".

She died, on 24 March 1985, at her home, where she had lived as an invalid for the last three years of her life. Her funeral service, at St Stephen's church, in Macquarie Street, was conducted by Wayside Chapel founder Rev. Ted Noffs.

Her correspondence and wartime diaries, for the period 1938 to 1947, are in the collection of the State Library of New South Wales. Two photographic portraits, by Melbourne Spurr (1888 – 1964), dating from her time in Hollywood in the early 1920s, are in the collection of the National Portrait Gallery of Australia, and a painted portrait, from 1952, by her friend Judy Cassab, is held by the State Library of New South Wales. Andrea Place, in the Canberra suburb of Bonython, is named in her honour.

== Partial filmography ==
- The Chorus Girl's Romance (1920)
- First Love (1921)
- Hills of Hate (1926)
- For the Term of his Natural Life (1927) - art direction
