= They Came from the Sea =

1955 novel by E.V. Timms

- First edition
- Author: E. V. Timms
- Language: English
- Series: Great South Land Saga
- Publisher: Angus and Robertson
- Publication date: 1955
- Publication place: Australia
- Pages: 237pp
- Preceded by: The Fury
- Followed by: Shining Harvest

They Came from the Sea is a 1955 Australian novel by E. V. Timms. It was the eighth in his Great South Land Saga of novels.

The Argues said "although not in the first rank of recent Australian novels, is an exciting book, full of incident."

The novel was serialised for Australian radio in 1965, adapted by Colin Roderick and read by Max Meldum.

== Premise ==
Survivors of a shipwreck on the New South Wales coast in 1856 try to survive.
