= Time and Chance =

Time and Chance may refer to:

- Time and Chance: Gerald Ford's Appointment with History, the official biography of U.S. President, Gerald R. Ford by James M. Cannon
- Time and Chance (Color Me Badd album), 1993
- Time and Chance (Caldera album), 1978
- Time and Chance, the 1987 memoirs of British prime minister James Callaghan
- Time and Chance (Kim Campbell), a 1996 book by Kim Campbell, former Prime Minister of Canada
- Time and Chance (Penman novel), a 2002 historical novel by Sharon Kay Penman
- Time and Chance: an Autobiography, the autobiography of science fiction and fantasy writer L. Sprague de Camp
- Time and Chance (Timms novel), a novel by Alma Timms
