= The Scarlet Frontier =

1953 novel by E.V. Timms

- First edition
- Author: E. V. Timms
- Language: English
- Series: Great South Land Saga
- Publisher: Angus and Robertson
- Publication date: 1953
- Publication place: Australia
- Preceded by: The Challenge
- Followed by: The Fury

The Scarlet Frontier is a 1953 Australian novel by E. V. Timms. It was the sixth in his Great South Land Saga of novels.

It was set in Southern Queensland and concerns three sisters.

== Reception ==
The Argus said: "The romance (some of it seamy), mystery, drama, suspense, is there. There are three sisters behaving in a most unsisteriy way and having a good-and honest tooth-and-nail fight over a couple of rugged early Australians. It is entertaining reading."

The Newcastle Herald said "The measure of one's liking for this book must be how much one can come to care for the Leighton sisters and their associates. This reviewer, for instance, nourished a forlorn hope against all acluarial probability that success might crown the efforts of the aborigines who attempt to liquidate the homestead and all its occupants in the closing stage of the book."

The Canberra Times said: "The story is a promising one, and its telling shows a pleasant prose coupled with a firm grasp of Australian society in the period covered."

== Radio Version ==
The novel was adapted for Australian radio in 1953. Episodes were read out by Lyndall Barbour.
