= Great South Land Saga =

Series of novels

The Great South Land Saga was a series of 12 novels by Australian writer E. V. Timms and his wife Alma.

From the beginning, Timms envisioned a 12-part series of novels. However he died while writing the eleventh and his wife took over the completion of that book. She then wrote the last novel on her own.

By the late 1970s, it was estimated over 850,000 copies of the novels had been sold.

== Novels ==
1. Forever to Remain (1948)
2. The Pathway of the Sun (1949)
3. The Beckoning Shore (1950)
4. The Valleys Beyond (1951)
5. The Challenge (1952)
6. The Scarlet Frontier (1953)
7. The Fury (1954)
8. They Came from the Sea (1955)
9. Shining Harvest (1956)
10. Robina (1958)
11. The Big Country (1962)
12. Time and Chance (1971) – by Alma Timms
