= James! How Dare You =

1940 novel by E.V. Timms

- First edition
- Author: E. V. Timms
- Language: English
- Genre: comedy-satire
- Publisher: Angus and Robertson
- Publication date: 1940
- Publication place: Australia

James! How Dare You! is a 1940 Australian novel by E. V. Timms. It is a sequel to James! Don't Be a Fool.

== Reception ==
According to one critic "there is a touch of Wodehouse about the dialogue, though Mr. Timms is guilty sometimes of hanging on too long. Wodehouse knows just how far to exploit nonsense in dialogue; Mr. Timms has still much to learn about it."

The critic from the Sydney Morning Herald stated that:

This is not Mr. Timms in his best vein. Indeed, it is a novel-which will disappoint not only those old readers who found his historical stories so enjoyable, but also any new ones who expect to find in this book some justification for all the praise they have heard of his earlier work. He has tried to write a combination of humorous novel and thriller, and has fallen between two stools. The humour is unfunny and repetitive, and the espionage part of the story is about as convincing as would be a story written around an English rural deanery by an Eskimo who had never left his Arctic homeland. "James, How Dare You" would seem to have been tossed off quickly to catch a market. This is unfortunate. Mr. Timms has done and can do a great deal better.

== Adaptation ==
It was adapted for radio in 1940.
