= The Big Country (Timms novel) =

1962 novel by E.V. Timms

- First edition
- Author: E. V. Timms; Alma Timms
- Language: English
- Series: Great South Land Saga
- Publisher: Angus and Robertson
- Publication date: 1962
- Publication place: Australia
- Preceded by: Robina
- Followed by: Time and Chance

The Big Country is a 1962 Australian novel by E. V. Timms and Alma Timms. It was the eleventh in the Great South Land Saga of novels.

E. V. Timms died in 1960, before the novel was finished so his wife Alma completed it.

He died while writing chapter five. Alma began writing in October 1960. She had helped research and plot all the novels in the saga so the task was relatively easy. "All the main characters were there," she said. "All I had to do was finish the story... Probably my husband would have finished it differently. But I don't think he would disapprove of what I've done."

== Plot ==
In the 1870s, beyond in Darling River, a half-caste girl, Jenny Courage, searches for her father, George Crumby, who abandoned her and her mother. George has moved to Sydney and prospered. Jenny works on a river board and becomes a housekeeper on an isolated station owned by Martha and Henry Gubby.
