= Forever to Remain =

1948 novel by E.V. Timms

- First edition
- Author: E. V. Timms
- Language: English
- Series: Great South Land Saga
- Genre: historical
- Publisher: Angus & Robertson
- Publication date: 1948
- Publication place: Australia
- Pages: 304pp
- Followed by: The Pathway of the Sun

Forever to Remain is a 1948 novel by E. V. Timms, the first in his Great South Land Saga series of novels. He wrote it intending to be the first in a 12-part series of novels. It is set in Western Australia, where Timms had spent some of his childhood. Timms had written a number of historical novels but this was his first with an Australian setting.

The initial print run was 20,000 copies, which was considered "colossal" in Australian publishing at the time.

It was published in Britain as The Violent Years.

== Plot ==
In 1831, the ship London Lass sails from London to Swan River settlement in Western Australia.

== Reception ==
The Sunday Times said "It is grand writing, the author's facile pen building array of persons full of human emotions, some of them coarse, others refined, but all so artistically portrayed that they take on the cloak of reality in the reader's mind."

The Brisbane Telegraph called it "a lusty piece of Australian historical novel writing."

== Radio adaptation ==
ABC Weekly 10 May 1952

=== 1949 serial ===
The novel was adapted for radio in 1949 as a serial where it was read out by an actor.

=== 1952 serial ===
The novel was adapted for radio again in 1952 as nine thirty-minute episodes for the ABC. This version was recorded in Adelaide. Timms himself did the adaptation. Stafford Dyson directed.

=== Cast of 1952 production ===
- Myra Noblett as Martha Gubby
- Len Sweeney as Henry Gubby
- Valda Ferris as Penelope
- Anne Haddy as Mary Ann
- Robert Matthews as Jeremy Lush
- Jack Taggart as Mr. Purvey
- Jack Hume as Mr. Benson
- Ron Haddrick as Simon Lee Challinor
- Dulcie Davenport as Eleanor Armitage
- John Cameron as Charles Armitage
- Thelma Baulderstone as Mrs. Higgins
- Alex Mclntosh. as narrator
