= Alicia Deane =

1932 novel by E.V. Timms

- Author: E. V. Timms
- Language: English
- Genre: historical romance
- Publisher: Angus and Robertson
- Publication date: 1932
- Publication place: Australia

Alicia Deane is an Australian novel by E. V. Timms set during the Monmouth Rebellion and is about a young woman who is sold into slavery and becomes a pirate.
