= The Cripple in Black =

1930 novel by E.V. Timms

- Issued as a Free Supplement to the Australian Women's Weekly in 1938
- Author: E. V. Timms
- Language: English
- Publication date: 1930
- Publication place: Australia

The Cripple in Black is a 1930 Australian novel by E. V. Timms set in seventeenth century Italy and England.

== Premise ==
Kindly Genoese merchant Balsamo becomes the vengeful "cripple in black" when a girl under his protection is abducted by an arrogant English aristocrat.

== Reception ==
The Sydney Morning Herald said that "Here and there one might wish for a little more skilful handling, but any shortcomings are amply compensated for by the work at the end. It Is an eminently readable story, with excellent characterisation."

The Argus criticised the conclusion.

== Radio version ==
The novel was adapted for the radio in 1939. It was read out by "Scribe" in fifteen minute episodes.
