= Time and Chance (Timms novel) =

1972 novel by Alma Timms

- First edition
- Author: Alma Timms
- Language: English
- Series: Great South Land Saga
- Publisher: Angus and Robertson
- Publication date: 1971
- Publication place: Australia
- Pages: 232pp
- ISBN: 0207122849
- Preceded by: The Big Country

Time and Chance is an Australian novel by Alma Timms. It was the twelfth in the Great South Land Saga of novels originally started by E. V. Timms. He died in 1960 while writing the 11th, The Big Country, which his wife Alma completed; she then wrote the final instalment. Alma had researched and help plot all the novels with her husband, so the task was relatively simple.

The books were republished in one volume in 1978 as The Timms Saga.

== Plot ==
The Gubbys - Martha, her husband, daughter Penelope, her husband Simon - return to England to visit Mary Ann.

== Background ==
When E.V. Timms died, his widow Alma completed his novel, The Big Country. Then she went overseas, came back home and moved to the city. She was unsure what to do next, and decided to write a nove that would complete her husband's Great Southern Land Saga.

== Reception ==
The Canberra Times wrote it "marks the end of a saga which began with much promise in 'Forever to Remain' and gradually frittered away into formula romance, which Mrs Timms handles no worse than her husband in his declining years."

The Age called it "light, pleasant reading."

Alma Timms later wrote another novel under her own name, A Town Rising (1976).
