= Shining Harvest =

1956 Australian novel by E.V. Timms

- First edition
- Author: E. V. Timms
- Language: English
- Series: Great South Land Saga
- Publisher: Angus and Robertson
- Publication date: 1956
- Publication place: Australia
- Preceded by: They Came from the Sea
- Followed by: Robina

Shining Harvest is a 1956 Australian novel by E. V. Timms. It was the ninth in his Great South Land Saga of novels.

== Premise ==
It concerns the struggle between two brothers who fall for the same woman. John Whitney owns a station in New South Wales. His brother Peter is a military officer who is living a life of leisure in Paris. Peter leaves his mistress, Margot, to join his brother in Australia. Both fall for Ann Barkly, a new arrival from England. Margot follows Peter to Australia to complicate matters.

The Gubby family feature as characters.

== Reception ==
The Argus said "Plenty of action, sudden deaths, drover's whistles, the thundering hooves of cattle, and the whole raucous, colorful cavalcade of Australia in its lusty infancy, will ensure Mr. Timms' readers of a good bill of fare."

== Radio version ==
The novel was serialised over Australian radio in 1957, being read out by Lyndall Barbour.
