= The Shadow Man (radio drama) =

The Shadow Man is a 1936 Australian radio drama created by E.V. Timms. The drama was about "The most daring jewel thief in England— exploring how he outwitted Scotland Yard and forced a murderer to take his own medicine."

It was followed by a sequel the same year The Shadow Man Again. According to a description in Wireless Weekly "we meet the Shadow Man and his valet Hutchins. The Shadow Man is reading his daily newspaper, and he comes upon an advertisement in the personal column: “Will the Shadow Man please ring V.S. at once? It will be a favor”."
