= Mona Kent =

American writer

Mona Kent (born Ramona Husselmann; 1909–1990) was an American writer of radio and television scripts.

== Early years ==
Kent was born Ramona Husselmann in Iowa, the third of six children. In 1924, at age 15, she left the family farm in Iowa "with her father's blessing and her mother's good riddance". She worked as a waitress and was a member of the typing pool at radio station WBBM in Chicago. At one point she filled in writing a soap-opera script for the station, then returned to the typing pool. "But I had the bug," she said.

== Career ==
After Kent's first husband lost most of his money in the stock market crash, they moved from Chicago to Lamar, Colorado, and operated radio station KIDW there. The two of them did everything at the station, including her writing scripts for, and acting in, the serial The Fiend of the Unfinished House. After absentee owners closed the station in 1933, Kent and her husband moved to Denver. From there they returned to Chicago, where she worked again in radio, 72 hours a week at WCFL.

She created several radio soap operas and is noted for having written every episode of Portia Faces Life, which was broadcast from 1940 to 1951. She contributed to the television science-fiction show Captain Video and His Video Rangers as well as numerous other adaptions and original stories for radio and television.

She wrote one novel, Mirror, Mirror on the Wall (1949), published in hardcover by Rinehart & Company, New York. It was reprinted in paperback in 1950. In an interview with Time in 1949, Kent said that she enjoyed writing for radio but that at times she felt "shame" at turning out such melodramatic scripts.

== Personal life ==
Kent was married three times. Her second husband was a Polish count. Her third husband was George Eddy.
