= They Were Champions =

Australian Radio Drama Series

They Were Champions is a 1952 Australian radio drama series about sports champions. A different champion was profiled in every new episode. Episodes ran for fifteen minutes and were directed by Don Haring and scripted by Haring and Ross Napier. Grace Gibson Productions made it.

== Select episodes ==
- Les Darcy
- Harvest Reward
- Man o' War
- John Cobb
- boxer Peter Jackson played by Reg Goldsworthy
- Paul McNaughton as boxer Joe Louis
- Monty Stratton
- Gottfried Von Cramm
- Rod Taylor as boxer Bob Fitzsimmons. It was narrated by Grant Taylor.
- Sir Malcolm Campbell
