= Dark Interlude (Timms novel) =

1939 novel by E.V. Timms

- First edition
- Author: E. V. Timms
- Language: English
- Publisher: Angus & Robertson
- Publication date: 1939
- Publication place: Australia
- Pages: 260pp

Dark Interlude is a 1939 Australian mystery novel by E. V. Timms.

== Synopsis ==
A woman, her brother and her fiance, board a train at country siding (against the orders of the train's guard) and find themselves in a darkened carriage with the corpse of a murdered man.

== Critical reception ==
A reviewer in The Sydney Morning Herald was intrigued with the setup but felt let down by the ending: "Very little can be said about it without revealing the denouement–which wouldn't be fair either to author or public. He ventures into astral spheres for the basis of his plot, and is convincing while he stays on the edge of reality. There is a fine creepy atmosphere about the affair which adds to the usual horrors connected with murder. A little too much repetitious dialogue takes the edge off some situations, and the upshot of it all is rather disappointing. If, however anyone wants a thorough attack of the jitters read Dark Interlude when alone in the house on a dark and stormy night!"
