= The Valleys Beyond =

1951 novel by E.V. Timms

- First edition
- Author: E. V. Timms
- Language: English
- Series: Great South Land Saga
- Genre: historical
- Publisher: Angus and Robertson
- Publication date: 1951
- Publication place: Australia
- Preceded by: The Beckoning Shore
- Followed by: The Challenge

The Valleys Beyond is a 1951 Australian novel by E. V. Timms. It was the fourth in his Great South Land Saga of novels.

The novel is set in 1841 and features a number of real life figures as characters including Caroline Chisolm.

== Premise ==
According to ABC Weekly the novel, set in 1884, takes place, "in the shadow of the Australian Alps, on the New South Wales side of the Murray River, live three families— the haughty 'Black' Olivers, the illiterate, despised Treggs, and the free-immigrant Martin family. Love and hate, violence and envy, madness and savagery were never far below the thin veneer, and when the two young women Tilly Martin and Meg Tregg battle for the attentions of young Everitt Oliver near-tragedy is the result. But out of the ashes of that near-tragedy E. V. Timms plucks the phoenix of future happiness."

== Reception ==
The Sun said it "descends to melodrama but the story moves at a fast pace and has a background of fascinating historical detail."

The Age said "There is a consciously, moral-making air about the book, and in un-likely court, scene, but it is a good, readable story of pioneering and its difficulties."

== Radio adaptation ==
The novel was adapted for radio by the ABC in 1953. It played in fifteen minute episodes read by Lyndall Barbour.
