= Margot Rhys =

Australian actress (1914–1996)

Margot Rhys (1914 – 21 June 1996) was an Australian actress best known for her lead roles in two films from Charles Chauvel, Heritage (1935) and Uncvilised (1936).

Rhys was born Kathleen Margot Rhys-Jones in South Yarra, Melbourne. She also worked as a model. She was married after making Uncivilised and appears to have retired.

== Stage credits ==
- Fair Exchange – August 1933
- Wedding Morning – September 1933

== Filmography ==
- Heritage (1935)
- Uncvilised (1936)
