= Whitehall (novel) =

1931 novel by E. V. Timms

- Author: E. V. Timms
- Language: English
- Genre: historical
- Publisher: Angus & Robertson
- Publication date: 1931
- Publication place: Australia

Whitehall is an Australian novel by E. V. Timms. It is set in 1670.

It was republished in 1956 as The Falcon.

== Plot ==
In 1670, Sir Richard Somerset fights wrongs under the name of "The Falcon". He is a patriotic member of the licentious court of Charles II and mistrustful of French patronage and influence at court.
