= Robina (novel) =

1958 novel by E.V. Timms

- First edition
- Author: E. V. Timms
- Language: English
- Series: Great South Land Saga
- Genre: melodrama
- Publisher: Angus and Robertson
- Publication date: 1958
- Publication place: Australia
- Preceded by: Shining Harvest
- Followed by: The Big Country

Robina is a 1958 Australian historical novel by E. V. Timms. It was the tenth in his Great South Land Saga of novels.

It was the last novel Timms completed in his lifetime, although two more in the Saga were published, the first of which, The Big Country, he co-wrote.

== Background ==
The novel is set around the settlement of South Australia. Charles and Robina Davenport adopt an abandoned child who they name James. Charles dies in 1836 and Robina must raise James.

Martha and Henry Gubby make an appearance.

== Reception ==
The Canberra Times said, "Although inevitably in such a series of books there is a certain sameness in style, there is also a quite surprising variety of plot and story."

Pacific Island Monthyl said, "Mr. Timms is one of several Australian writers who feel some sort of divine mission to get their country’s early history down on paper. There is nothing wrong with the idea; it is the execution that is so tedious."
