= The Hills of Hate =

1925 novel by Australian author E. V. Timms

- Author: E. V. Timms
- Language: English
- Genre: Novel
- Publisher: Cornstalk Publishing
- Publication date: 1925
- Publication place: Australia
- Media type: Print
- Pages: 211 pp.
- Preceded by: –
- Followed by: The Valley of Adventure

The Hills of Hate is a 1925 novel by the Australian author E. V. Timms. It was the author's debut novel.

The first edition of the novel included illustrations by Percy Lindsay.

== Synopsis ==
Two families of station-holders in Queensland, the Blakes and the Ridgeways, become estranged when sons of both families fall in love with the same woman.

== Publishing history ==
After its initial publication in Australia by Cornstalk Publishing in 1925, it was serialised in The World's News between October 1927 and January 1928, and then reprinted in 1936 by Australian Consolidated Press in a revised version.

== Critical reception ==
A reviewer in The Sun (Sydney) noted that the novel showed promise: "Further, may he be commended for a fertile imagination, a sense of dramatic effect, and a virile, human touch...Lack of cunning is its chief fault. Sometimes one gains the impression of a wandering spotlight and the fruity tones of melodrama, but the story is there. It holds a promise of better work to follow."

In The Age a critic thought more of the book: "It is a tale of the sensational type, but it is well conceived and admirably written...Events fairly race through the pages, and the interest never slackens."

== Film adaptation ==
The novel was adapted as a film titled Hills of Hate in 1926, directed by Raymond Longford with a screenplay by E. V. Timms.

== See also ==
- 1925 in Australian literature
