= Conflict (novel) =

1934 novel by E.V. Timms

- 1957 edition (A&R)
- Author: E. V. Timms
- Language: English
- Genre: historical
- Publisher: Angus & Robertson
- Publication date: 1934
- Publication place: Australia

Conflict is a 1934 historical novel by Australian author E. V. Timms.

It was considered a key work in Timms' career.

== Plot ==
The novel is set mostly in France and the Mediterranean during the reign of Louis XIV. Some French fishermen are captured by Moslem corsairs and forced to become galley slaves. They rebel against their captors and turn pirate, later encountering English warships.

== Critical response ==
Some critics compared Timms with the best of Rafael Sabatini.
