= Cattleman (radio series) =

1961 Australian radio series

- Genre: serial drama
- Running time: 15 mins
- Country of origin: Australia
- Language: English
- Created by: R. S. Porteus
- Written by: Ross Napier
- Executive producer: Grace Gibson
- Original release: 1961
- No. of episodes: 208

Cattleman is a 1961 Australian radio series based on a novel by R. S. Porteus. It was one of the most successful radio series of the 1960s.

Grace Gibson heard Porteus talking about the book in an interview and optioned the rights even before it had been published. She assigned Ross Napier to write the scripts.

The book was dramatised in 104 episodes. However, the serial was so popular, it continued for another 104 episodes.

== Premise ==
An old man, Ben Macready, tells his life story to friends who come to visit him as he lies on his deathbed. His story covers three generations and two world wars, as he recounts tales of life in the Australian outback, flights from the police, cattle duffing, pioneering, marriage and wartime service.

== Cast ==
- Frank Waters as Ben McReady
- Nigel Lovell as Ben McReady (replaced Waters)
- Lyndall Barbour as Biddy, an Aboriginal girl
- Diana Perryman as Anne McReady
- Lance Bennett as Danny McReady
- Tom Farley as Dan Clancy
- Lynne Murphy
- Muriel Steinbeck as Judith
- John Gray
- Walter Sullivan
- Margo Lee
- Wendy Playfair
- John Unicomb
- Bob McDarra as Charlie Turner
- Ken Frazer
