= Black Dragon =

Black dragon may refer to:

== Arts and entertainment ==
- The Black Dragon (comic book), a 1980s comic book series
- Black Tiger (video game), a 1987 video game known as Black Dragon in Japan
- Miracles (1989 film) or Black Dragon, a film by Jackie Chan
- Black Dragons, a 1942 American film starring Bela Lugosi
- "Black Dragon", a song on Luca Turilli's 1999 album King of the Nordic Twilight
- "Black Dragon", a song on Dissection's 2006 album Reinkaos

=== Fictional entities ===
- Black dragon (Dungeons & Dragons), an evil species of dragon with an acid-breath weapon
- Black Dragon Ninja, an enemy of the Arashigake clan in the G.I. Joe: A Real American Hero franchise
- Black Dragon Society (comics), a fictional version of the Black Dragon Society
- A criminal organization that appears in the Mortal Kombat series
- Black dragons, also known as dangerous first-class monsters, a category of monster in the Monster Hunter series

== Other uses ==
- Black Dragon Fighting Society, a martial arts organization created by Count Dante
- Black Dragon River (or Amur), a river on the Russia/China border
- Black Dragon Society, a Japanese right-wing paramilitary group
- Black Dragons (Chinese-American gang), a Chinese/American criminal organization
- Black Dragons (French gang), a French anti-racist gang
- 240 mm howitzer M1, a towed howitzer used by the United States Army, popularly nicknamed "Black Dragon"
- USS New Jersey (BB-62) or "Black Dragon", a U.S. Navy battleship
- Mascot of Seoul National University of Science and Technology
- Nickname of the tidal bore on the Qiantang River
- Chinese Dragon God of the north and the essence of winter
- Various oolong tea
