= Black Dragons =

1942 film by William Nigh

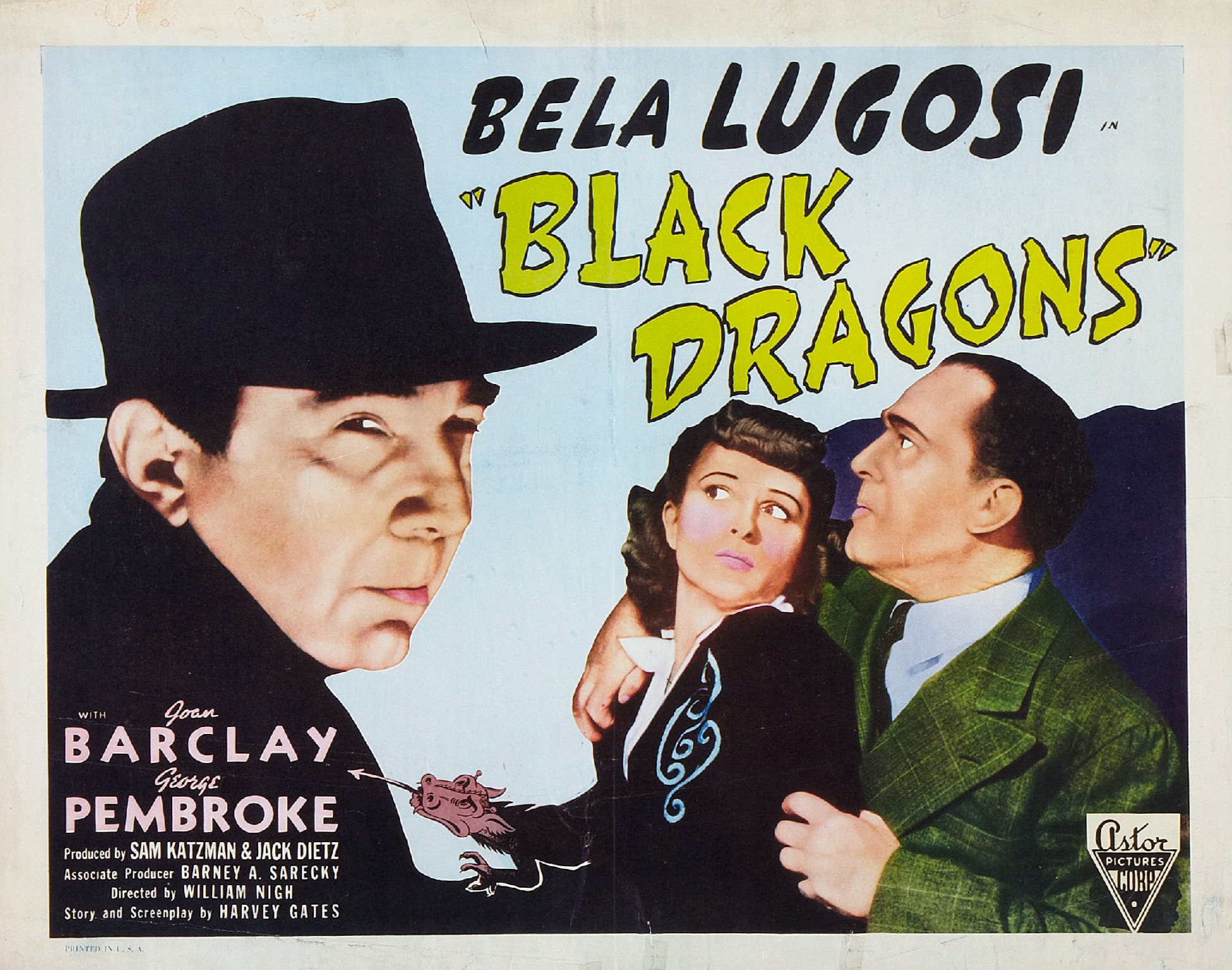
- Promotional lobby card
- Directed by: William Nigh
- Written by: Robert Kehoe; Harvey Gates
- Produced by: Jack Dietz; Sam Katzman associate Barney A. Sarecky
- Starring: Bela Lugosi; Joan Barclay; George Pembroke
- Cinematography: Arthur Reed
- Edited by: Carl Pierson
- Music by: Johnny Lange; Lew Porter; Heinz Roemheld
- Production company: Banner Pictures Corporation
- Distributed by: Monogram Pictures Corporation
- Release date: March 6, 1942
- Running time: 64 min.
- Country: United States
- Language: English

The full film

Black Dragons is a 1942 American film directed by William Nigh and starring Bela Lugosi, Joan Barclay, and George Pembroke. The cast includes Clayton Moore, who plays a handsome detective. The Black Dragon Society also appears in Let's Get Tough! a 1942 East Side Kids film made by the same team of writer Harvey Gates and producer Sam Katzman.

== Plot ==
It is prior to the American entry into World War II, and Japan's fiendish Black Dragon Society is hatching an evil plot with the Nazis. They instruct a brilliant scientist, Dr. Melcher, to travel to Japan on a secret mission. There he operates on six Japanese conspirators, transforming them to resemble six American leaders. The actual leaders are murdered and replaced with their likenesses. Dr. Melcher is condemned to a lifetime of imprisonment so the secret may die with him.

== Cast ==
- Bela Lugosi as Dr. Melcher aka Monsieur Colomb / Cell Prisoner
- Joan Barclay as Alice Saunders
- George Pembroke as Dr. Bill Saunders
- Clayton Moore as Dick Martin
- Robert Frazer as Amos Hanlin
- Edward Peil, Sr. as Philip Wallace (credited as Edward Piel Sr.)
- Robert Fiske as Ryder
- Irving Mitchell as John Van Dyke
- Kenneth Harlan as FBI Chief Colton
- Max Hoffman Jr. as Kearney
- Frank Melton as FBI Agent
- Joseph Eggenton as Stevens
- I. Stanford Jolley as The Dragon (credited as Stanford Jolley)
- Jack Cheatham as Policeman (uncredited)
- Jack Chefe as Hotel Clerk (uncredited)
- Bernard Gorcey as The Cabbie (uncredited)
- Jack Holmes as Industrialist (uncredited)
- Ethelreda Leopold as Girl at Party (uncredited)
- Carl M. Leviness as Industrialist (uncredited)

== Production ==
The film was rushed into production following the attack on Pearl Harbor. It was to begin filming on 17 January 1942 but this was pushed back until 21 January. The original working title was The Yellow Menace.

== Release ==
The film was released in Los Angeles on the double bill with the Australian film Pituri (also known as Uncivilised).

The Los Angeles Times said that "those who love their mystery and their Lugosi will find this film unusually sinister."

The film was colorized in the 1990s.

== See also ==
- Black Dragons (gang), a modern Triad organisation.
- Black Dragons (subculture), a French antifascist group analogous to the Black Panthers.
