= Portia Faces Life =

American radio and TV soap opera

- For much of the radio series, Portia Blake was portrayed by Lucille Wall (far right), seen here with two unidentified actors.
- Genre: Soap opera
- Written by: Mona Kent
- Starring: Lucille Wall

Original release
- Network: NBC/CBS Radio
- Release: April 1, 1940 – 1953
- Network: CBS
- Release: April 5, 1954 – July 1, 1955

Portia Faces Life is an American soap opera first broadcast as a radio series from 1940 to 1953, and then on television for a single season in the mid-1950s. It began in syndication on April 1, 1940, and was broadcast on some stations that carried NBC programs, although it does not seem to have been an official part of that network's programming. The original title was Portia Blake Faces Life.

Stations airing the series, according to newspaper advertisements, included WNAC in Boston, WLS in Chicago, KRLD in Dallas, KGW in Portland, Oregon and KFI in Los Angeles.

The series became part of the CBS Radio Network, on October 7, 1940, and its title was changed to Portia Faces Life. It was sponsored by the company General Foods.

Portia Faces Life continued on CBS until April 25, 1941. Three days later, it moved to NBC where it continued until March 31, 1944. It then returned to CBS as a summer series from April 3 to September 29, 1944. Heard on NBC from October 3, 1944 to June 29, 1951, the series continued until 1953, according to scriptwriter Mona Kent, who wrote every episode. General Foods remained the sponsor through all 13 years of the radio series.

On November 7, 1950, the program began honoring a Woman of the Week on its Wednesday episodes. The first honoree was Marguerite Higgins, who was the first female war correspondent in Korea.

The programme was launched to television as a series by CBS, airing from April 5, 1954, until July 1, 1955. The TV series version stars Frances Reid as Portia Blake Manning. Reid was replaced by Fran Carlon from July 5, 1954. The program was also retitled as The Inner Flame in March 1955.

== Characters and story ==
The title character Portia Blake (Lucille Wall) is an attorney who faced hardships as she fought corruption in the small town of Parkersburg. She was a widow with a ten-year-old son named Dickie; her husband Richard had been murdered by criminal elements he had fought to expose. The idea of a woman lawyer as a protagonist was unusual for the time, and newspaper advertisements described Blake as "a courageous woman attorney who battles forces of crime, injustice, and civic corruption" in a typical American city. Also part of the storyline was the character of crusading journalist Walter Manning (played by Myron McCormick), who was secretly in love with her. Manning was trying to expose the criminals responsible for the death of Portia's husband.

== Australian version ==
A localized version of Portia Faces Life was launched in Australia in 1952 and began transmission from the radio station 3UZ in Melbourne. It was introduced by American expatriate Grace Gibson.

It stars Lyndall Barbour as the title character, who was renamed "Portia Manning".

It was broadcast for 3,544 quarter-hour episodes until 1970. Every episode started with the introduction, "A story taken from the heart of every woman who has ever dared to love."

The series also was broadcast from the ZB radio network in New Zealand.

Following the conclusion of Portia Faces Life, Lyndall Barbour was cast as Portia again in four smaller shows: Partners in Jeopardy, The Silent Witness, The Haverlock Affair and The Seed of Evil. Portia Manning also had cameo appearances in Violets are Blue, Clayton Place and Thirty Days Hath September.

== See also ==
- List of radio soaps
