= Heritage (1935 film) =

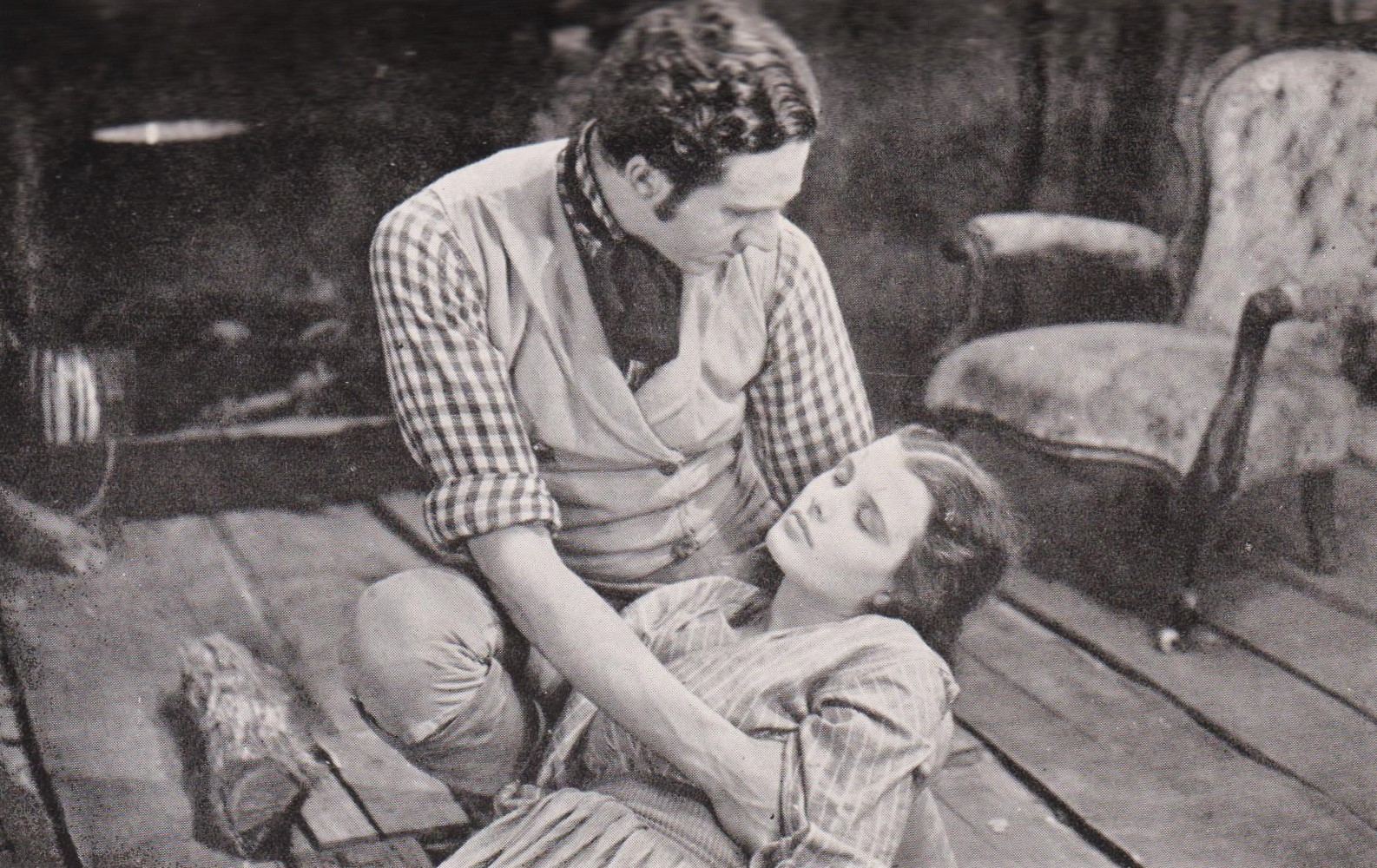
- The death of Biddy O'Shea scene from Heritage, 1935
- Directed by: Charles Chauvel
- Written by: Charles Chauvel
- Produced by: Charles Chauvel
- Starring: Peggy Maguire; Franklyn Bennett; Margot Rhys
- Cinematography: Arthur Higgins; Tasman Higgins
- Edited by: Lola Lindsay; Mona Donaldson (re-cut)
- Production company: Expeditionary Films
- Distributed by: Universal Pictures (Australia); Columbia Pictures (UK); Variety Films (US); Umbrella Entertainment
- Release date: 13 April 1935 (Australia); 1941 (United States)
- Running time: 94 min
- Country: Australia
- Language: English
- Budget: £24,000 or £20,000

Heritage is a 1935 Australian historical film directed by Charles Chauvel.

== Plot ==
In colonial Australia, James Morrison is a young bullocky who has two friends, Long and Short. He is betrothed to Jane Judd when he visits Sydney and meets fiery Irish girl Biddy O'Shea, who is just off the "wife ship" – a boatload of women from an Irish orphanage brought out to Australia. James is attracted to Biddy and promises to marry her. James returns to Bathurst to break the news to Jane, but his mother dies and makes James promise to marry her daughter. He feels obliged to honour his old commitment to Jane.

Biddy hears of the news and marries an ex-convict, James Parry, whom she does not love. They start a farm and have a baby son, Jack. James later comes across a homestead being attacked by Aboriginals and discovers Biddy mortally wounded, and her husband dead – but her baby is still alive. James raises the baby as his own. Frank Parry grows up as brother with Tom, the son of James and Jane.

In the 1930s Frank Morrison battles to save his outback station. He falls in love with Biddy Parry.

== Cast ==
- Frank Harvey as Governor Arthur Phillip
- Franklyn Bennett as James Morrison and Frank Morrison
- Margot Rhys as Jane Judd
- Peggy Maguire as Biddy O'Shea and Biddy Parry
- Harold Meade as Frank Parry
- Joe Valli as Short
- Norman French as Governor Lachlan Macquarie
- Leonard Stephens as Greenway
- Austin Milroy as Major Ross
- Victor Fitzherbert as William Wentworth
- Gertrude Boswell as Mrs Judd
- Dora Mostyn as Mother Carey
- Godfrey Cass as Harding
- Florence Esmond as Mrs Boggs
- Victor Gouriet as artist
- Field Fisher as Gerald Cracknell
- Rita Pauncefort as Mrs Cobbold
- David Ware as Long
- Kendrick Hudson as Morrison Jnr

== Production ==
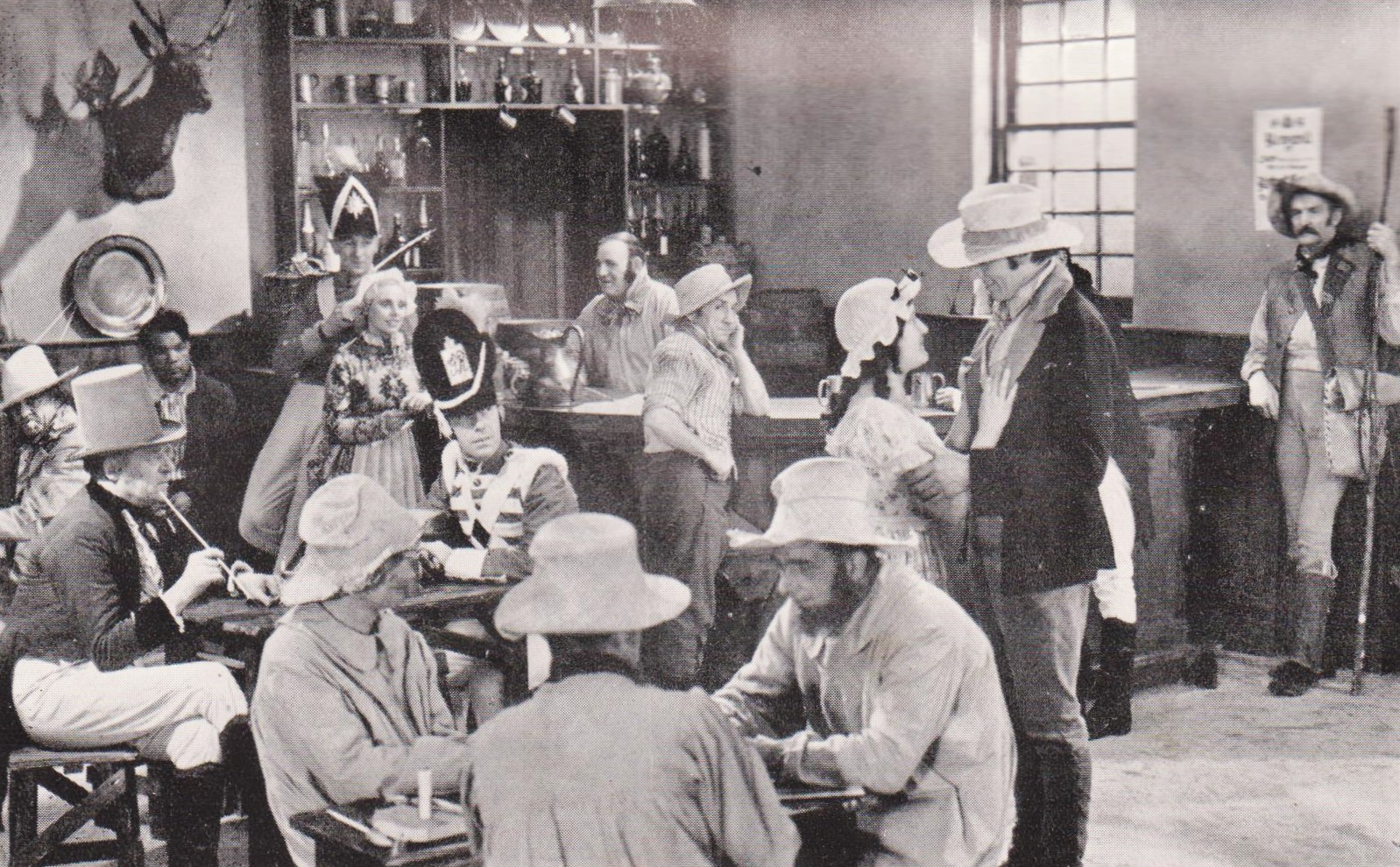
A scene from Heritage, 1935

Heritage was originally conceived in 1933, while Charles Chauvel was organising publicity for his previous film, In the Wake of the Bounty. The Australian government, in a bid to encourage the local film industry, announced the Commonwealth Prize, an award of £2,500 to the best Australian-made film. Chauvel declared his intentions to enter the competition, and conceived a large-scale historical drama, spanning 150 years of Australian history, to maximise his likelihood of winning.

The film was announced in July 1933. It was dubbed an Australian version of Cavalcade and was supported by Herb McIntyre of Universal. It would cover Australian history form the arrival of Captain Cook to the Great Depression. Chauvel announced plans to hold a Miss NSW competition to promote the movie.

By February 1934 the film was called Heritage and registered a script the following month.

Chauvel was able to secure a budget of £24,000 from his company Expeditionary Films. Extensive research was undertaken to ensure that props, costumes, hairstyles and music were accurate to their historical settings.

=== Casting ===
Peggy Maguire was the 16-year-old convent-educated daughter of Brisbane hoteliers Mary Jane and Michael Maguire. Chauvel discovered her and signed her to a £100 a week contract, launching her career. Publicity pushed her as "Australia's Janet Gaynor". Margot Rhys was a model.

Male lead Franklyn Bennett was from Sydney amateur theatre. He changed his name from Bruce Bennett Smith.

=== Shooting ===
Production began in April 1934 and went for eight months. Studio scenes were shot at Efftee Studios in St Kilda, Melbourne. Outdoor filming took place in New South Wales and Queensland. Forty Aboriginals were employed to appear in a scene filmed at Canungra, Queensland. There were also scenes shot at Parliament House in Canberra and Governor Phillip's landing in Sydney was shot at Pittwater.

== Reception ==
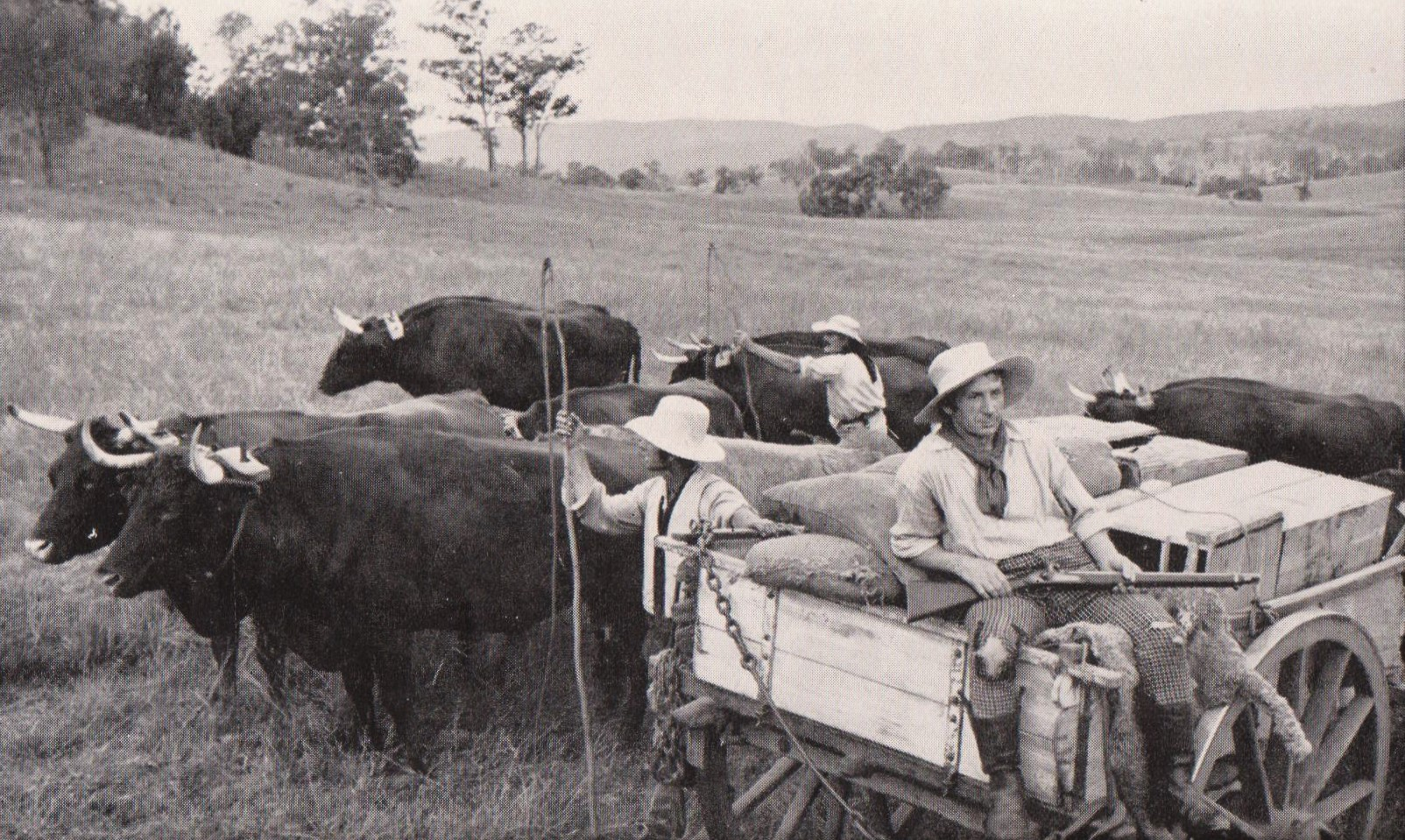
A scene from Heritage, 1935

Heritage was first released on 13 April 1935, and distributed by Universal Films through the General Theatres Corporation. Of the thirteen films in contention for the Australian government's Commonwealth Prize, Heritage was awarded the top prize of £2,500. The runner-up films were Ken G. Hall's The Silence of Dean Maitland, in second place (£1,250), and Frank Harvey's Clara Gibbings, in third place (£750). The judges stated that the film "comprised a constructive effort in Australian film development, showing fine pictorial quality and camera work."

The critical reception was mixed. Some reviewers celebrated the film as "worthy of Australia's hopes" and "a challenge to the overseas film industry." Other commentators criticised Heritage as uneven, some blaming the comparatively small budget.

Historically, the film is often considered a commercial failure, though contemporary press releases report that the film's six-week takings matched those of the highest-grossing imported films. It is doubtful it recovered its costs.

Aspects of the film were criticised in New South Wales Parliament. There were allegations that the Deputy Premier of New South Wales had shares in Expeditionary Films Ltd, and that was why the government was supporting the introduction of a quota.

Heritage was received with mixed success in England, but was profitable in the United States for an American distributor who had cheaply purchased the distribution rights for $300.
