= The Beckoning Shore =

1950 novel by E.V. Timms

- First edition
- Author: E. V. Timms
- Language: English
- Series: Great South Land Saga
- Publisher: Angus and Robertson
- Publication date: 1950
- Publication place: Australia
- Preceded by: The Pathway of the Sun
- Followed by: The Valleys Beyond

The Beckoning Shore is a 1950 novel by E. V. Timms. It was the third in his Great South Land Saga of Australian historical novels, and shifts the action to New South Wales.

It was popular, selling 10,000 copies within its first year.

The novel was later reprinted in 1955 by Harlequin Enterprises in Canada under the title Convict Town, as number 330 in their list of Harlequin Romance novels.

== Premise ==
The West Australian described the premise in December 1950 as follows: "How the ship Pride of Liverpool became a derelict from which only two of the company were saved, one being the girl Elizabeth Holley, about whom the novel revolves."

== Reception ==
The Age said "The entertaining story swings along, a happy way to discuss the convict system and its various unsavory off- shoots and the efforts to control these evils. Occasionally, seeming to be steeped in history, the author halts the narrative to add a slab that holds up the movement for a short space."

The Australian Woman's Mirror said "As ever, Mr. Timms sets his characters against an authentically historic background, in which convictism and its related sordid evils are contrasted with the high ideals of the visionaries and the gaiety of the society of that era. "

The Bulletin said "Taken at its highest level, the book is a prettv thin story superimposed on pretty thick history; but its total effect is of a very lively picture of Sydney in the days of Governor Bourke."

== Radio adaptations ==
ABC Weekly 20 June 1953

The novel was serialised for radio in 1951, with Peter Woodruff reading out sections of the novel over fifteen minute episodes.

The novel was dramatised again for radio in 1953. These episodes went for one hour. The adaptation was done by Kathleen Carroll who had also adapted Timm's The Pathway of the Sun for radio.

=== Cast of 1953 production ===
- Queenie Ashton as Martha
- Leonard Thiele as Simon
- June Salter as Penelope
- Marie Clark as Elizabeth Holley
- Edwin Finn as Edward
- Rosemary Miller as Sabina Perry
- Neva Carr-Glyn as Liza Foll
- Alan Herbert as Sweeney Foll
