= Uncivilised (film) =

- Directed by: Charles Chauvel
- Written by: E. V. Timms; Charles Chauvel
- Produced by: Charles Chauvel
- Starring: Dennis Hoey; Margot Rhys
- Cinematography: Tasman Higgins
- Edited by: Frank Coffey; Mona Donaldson
- Music by: Lindley Evans
- Production company: Expeditionary Films
- Distributed by: Universal Pictures (Australia); Box Office Attractions (US); Umbrella Entertainment
- Release date: September 1936 (Australia)
- Running time: 82 minutes (Aust); 77 minutes (US)
- Country: Australia
- Language: English
- Budget: £20,000

Uncivilised is a 1936 Australian film directed by Charles Chauvel. It was an attempt by Chauvel to make a more obviously commercial film, and was clearly influenced by Tarzan.

The film is known as Uncivilized and Pituri in the United States.

== Plot summary ==
Successful author Beatrice Lynn is commissioned by her publisher to go to the Outback and locate the "legendary" white man, Mara, who heads an Aboriginal Australian tribe. Travelling by camel, she is abducted by an Afghan cameleer, Akbar Jhan. He and his group of Aboriginal people provide pituri, a narcotic, to other Aboriginal people. Previously not allowed into Mara's tribal land to sell his wares, Akbar Jhan has schemed to use Beatrice, a white woman, to arouse Mara's interest.

Meanwhile, the Australian Mounted Police has its hands full with a missing inspector, an international drug ring, and a tribe of Aboriginal warriors led by Moopil who have killed two prospectors, as well as searching for the missing Beatrice.

Mara buys Beatrice from Jhan, and the two fall in love.

== Cast ==
- Margot Rhys as Beatrice Lynn
- Dennis Hoey as Mara the White Chief
- Ashton Jarry as The Mounted Policeman – posing as Akbar Jhan the White Slaver
- Marcelle Marnay as Sondra the Half-Caste
- Kenneth Brampton as Trask the Opium Smuggler
- Victor Fitzherbert as John Hemmingway, publisher
- Edward Howell as Vitchi the Witch Doctor
- Edward Sylveni as Salter
- Frank Dwyer as Bloom, a prospector
- Rita Aslim as Nardin
- John Fernside as Captain
- Jessica Malone as Hemmingway's Secretary
- Richard Mazar as Tong
- Z. Gee as Tiki
- David McNiven
- Norman Rutledge
- Bill Onus, as one of the Aboriginal men

== Development ==
After making Heritage, Expeditionary Films were in an expansive mood and increased their capital from £15,000 to £50,000. They announced they had signed a contract with E. V. Timms to provide a story, and also planned to make a movie about contemporary city life. The second project was never made but the Timms story was.

In July 1935, Chauvel announced the film would be called Uncivilised and concern a white man who grows up among Aboriginal people in North Queensland. Chauvel said he was inspired by real life white men who lived among Aboriginals including James Murrel, James Bracefield, William Buckley, John Petrie, Joseph Forbes and John Edwards.

By October he had cast Margot Rhys, who had been in Heritage, and Dennis Hoey, who was imported from England. Hoey arrived in Australia on 20 October. Filmink argued "Hoey was hardly a box office name, or even that famous, but imported C-list stars were all the rage in mid ‘30s Australian movies."

== Production ==
Chauvel commenced location filming on Palm Island that month. Location shooting went for six weeks, with the use of Aboriginal actors strictly controlled by the Aboriginal Control Board.

Interior scenes were shot at the newly constructed National Studios at Pagewood – it was the first production shot there. Aboriginal actors were brought down from Queensland to act in the studio scenes. Chauvel defended his treatment of these Aboriginal extras during filming.

During filming, an animal trainer was attacked by a python, but he recovered and went back to work.

After ten weeks in the studio, Chauvel then shot additional scenes at the Burragorang Valley and the Royal National Park.

The final sequences were filmed out near Broken Hill.

It was the last film for scenic artist Jack Coleman.

== Release ==
Chauvel showed preview scenes to the press in May.

Uncivilised had to have two scenes excised by the censor for export. One scene was Margot Rhys swimming in the nude, another was a strangulation of an aborigine. No cuts were required in Victoria.

=== Critical ===
Reviews were mixed. The Bulletin said Chauvel put his cast "into well-chosen, convincing scenic settings, kept the action moving briskly, and utilised, perhaps more effectively than authentically, some of the most picturesque features of life in Australia’s Wild Nor’-west."

Everyone's said it was "further demonstration of encouraging progress in Australian talkie making: soundly based in melodrama and spiced with novel romantic appeal, the injection of sequences detailing aboriginal tribal dances and introducing perfectly filmed scenic backgrounds are factors which will definitely find a world interest in the picture."

Variety magazine stated:

At last there issues from an Australian studio a picture fit to grace the screens of the world. Very novelty of the setting, should give Uncivilised a spot on the American screen. Not, however, as an ace attraction but on duals because, outside Australia, the marquee names mean nothing... Chauvel has turned in the picture of his career, and one that should . place Australia on the map.

Filmink called the movie "fast paced and visually striking, with plenty of plot and action, a fantastic climatic battle, enjoyably over the top camp dialogue, and a sexy nude swim from Rhys."

== US release ==
The film was released in the US and performed well at the box office. However Expeditionary Films had sold the rights and benefited little from this. The company soon wound up and made no more movies.

The film was re-released in Los Angeles in March 1942 as Pituri and played on a double bill with Black Dragons. The Los Angeles Times called it "a fast moving story whose elements maybe a little shopworn but which appeared new against the unusual background... picture proves that when the Australians get into their real stride as picture makers they will be second to none: for acting, production and photography are second to none." This version screened in New York the following year.

The film is now in the public domain.

== Soundtrack ==
Dennis Hoey's Mala character sings several songs in the manner of Paul Robeson.

== Novel ==
A novelisation of the script was published in 1936. Authorship was attributed solely to Charles Chauvel but it is believed the book was written by Timms. Early reports announced the novel was written by Timms.

== Novelisation ==
- Serialisation of novel in The Land 6 Aug 1937 to 11 Feb 1938 – 6 Aug, 13 Aug, 20 Aug, 27 Aug, 3 Sept, 10 Sept, 17 Sept, 24 Sept, 1 Oct, 8 Oct, 15 Oct, 22 Oct, 29 Oct, 5 Nov, 12 Nov, 19 Nov, 26 Nov, 3 Dec, 10 Dec, 17 Dec, 31 Dec, 7 Jan, 14 Jan, 28 Jan, 4 Feb, 11 Feb
