= Melbourne Spurr =

American photographer (1888–1964)

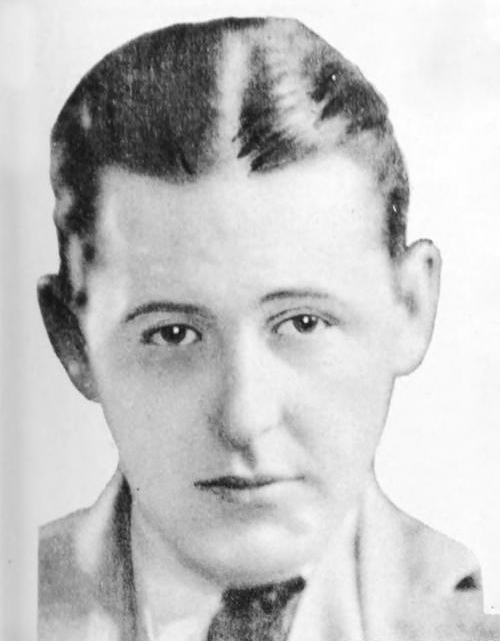
Melbourne Spurr (1925)

Melbourne Spurr (1888–1964) was an American photographer, active during the first half of the 20th century. He is best known for his photographs of film actors, taken between 1916 and around the mid-1930s. Melbourne Edwin Spurr was born on 22 December 1889 at Decorah, Iowa and died on 3 October 1964 at Los Angeles. He was profoundly deaf.

== Biography ==
=== Family background ===
Melbourne Erwin Spurr was born deaf on 22 December 1888 at Decorah, Iowa, His father was Ervin Willard Spurr and his mother was Nettie Spurr (née Stiles). He had a sister, Gladys Celeste Spurr, and a brother, Wilbur Shimer Spurr. His father was a celebrated photographer of artists and scientists, who was also the proprietor of Studio One Man at Waterloo, in Black Hawk county, Iowa.

=== Career ===
In 1910, he began his photographic career with his father, before moving to Chicago where he opened his first studio.

In 1916, Melbourne Spurr went to Hollywood, with ambitions of being a film actor. However, film directors were not interested in working with deaf actors, because it was expected to be difficult to manage them.

Through the influence of his father, Spurr found work with renowned photographer Fred Hartsook, who worked taking photographs of rising celebrities. Among Spurr's first Hollywood photographs were those of a young comedian named Charlie Chaplin. Impressed by photographs Spurr took of the actress, Mary Pickford, Fred Hartsook decided to assist Spurr to launch a career taking photographic portraits in Hollywood.

By the mid-1920s, Spurr was regarded as one of the foremost portraitists of celebrities in the world. He often photographed celebrities such as, Vilma Banky, John Barrymore, Hobart Bosworth, Fanny Brice, Betty Compson, Marion Davies, William de Mille, Douglas Fairbanks, Pauline Frederick, Buster Keaton, Jacqueline Logan, June Marlowe, Alla Nazimovam, Pola Negri, Norma Shearer, Norma Talmadge, Alice Terry, Bryant Washburn, and many others.

His career flourished, while his clients chose their own photographers. By the end of the 1920s, with the rise of the 'studio system', publicity photographs were controlled by the film studios; Spurr refused to work under that arrangement. He continued to photograph writers, artists, and politicians, but as the silent era film stars became forgotten, his work slipped into obscurity.

=== Personal life and death ===
Melbourne Spurr married Kathryn Harris in Hollywood, but left her for a German actress of Hungarian origin, Lena Malena. Three years after he left her his wife demanded a divorce.

Spurr died on 3 October 1964, at Los Angeles, California, and was interred in the Hollywood Forever Cemetery.
