= The Pathway of the Sun =

1949 novel by E.V. Timms

- First edition
- Author: E. V. Timms
- Language: English
- Series: Great South Land Saga
- Publisher: Angus and Robertson
- Publication date: 1949
- Publication place: Australia
- Preceded by: Forever to Remain
- Followed by: The Beckoning Shore

The Pathway to the Sun is a 1949 novel by Australian author E. V. Timms. It was the second in his Great South Land Saga of historical novels.

The working title of the book was Wilderness. Timms evisioned from the beginning that the books would be part of a twelve volume saga, saying "I don't want this to be just a series of cheap little love stories in costume. I want it to tell, the historical and social progress of this country, the transition from the British way of life to the Australian way of life, the great efforts we have made."

== Premise ==
A woman escapes from Hobart Town to Fremantle.

== Radio adaptations ==
ABC Weekly 17 May 1952

It was adapted into a radio play in 1950 and 1952.

=== 1950 version ===
The 1950 version the novel was adapted by Colin Roderick and read out by Kevin Brennan in fifteen minute episodes.

=== 1952 version ===
The 1952 version was adapted by Kathleen Carroll and was broadcast in 60 minute episodes. Unlike the 1952 radio adaptation of Forever to Remain which had been done by the ABC, this version of Pathway to the Sun was done by a commercial organisation, Grace Gibson Productions.

The Brisbane Truth thought the first episode "was not very encouraging" in part because actor Sheila Ewell "sounds too hysterical to live. Maybe in future episodes serial will improve but having knowledge of the book, this writer would say it will have to calm down a lot to produce the true interpretation of the characters as intended by Timms."

The serial was well received and Grace Gibson Productions would adapt Timms' next novel, The Beckoning Shore.

The serial was repeated again in 1954.

=== Cast of 1952 production ===
- Leonard Thiele as Simon Challinor
- Lynne Murphy as Penelope Challinor
- Sheila Sewell as Ginny Lockey
