= Far Caravan =

1935 novel by E.V. Timms

- Author: E. V. Timms
- Language: English
- Publisher: Angus & Robertson
- Publication date: 1935
- Publication place: Australia

Far Caravan is a historical novel by Australian author E. V. Timms, an adventure story set in 17th-century Russia.
