= Lawrence, Prince of Mecca =

Book by E.V. Timms

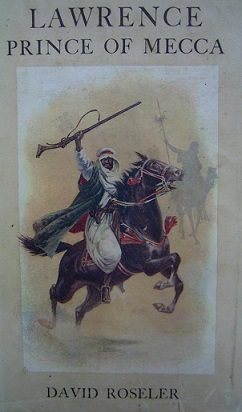
- First edition
- Author: E. V. Timms (as "David Roseler")
- Language: English
- Publisher: Cornstalk Publishing
- Publication date: 1927
- Publication place: Australia

Lawrence, Prince of Mecca is a 1927 biographical book about T. E. Lawrence by E. V. Timms writing under the name "David Roseler".

Timms later worked on the film Forty Thousand Horsemen which was set during the same period of history.
