= The Valley of Adventure (Timms novel) =

1926 novel by E. V. Timms

The Valley of Adventure is a 1926 Australian novel by E. V. Timms. In the novel, a father and his sons discover a map that takes them to a hidden valley.

The novel was well received. Table Talk called it "quite a thrilling book of adventure with an Australian setting, which will appeal to boys especially." The Bulletin wrote, "The boy who does not devour this veracious chronicle with a galloping appetite is no boy."

== Radio Adaptation and Sequel Cities Under the Sea ==
In 1937, The Valley of Adventure was adapted into a radio serial. The production ranks among Timms' best remembered works for radio.

There was a sequel Cities Under the Sea, which was released in 1937. The radio serial was then adapted into a novel, which Timms published in 1948.
