= The Challenge (novel) =

1952 novel by E.V. Timms

- First edition
- Author: E. V. Timms
- Language: English
- Series: Great South Land Saga
- Publisher: Angus and Robertson
- Publication date: 1952
- Publication place: Australia
- Pages: 316pp
- Preceded by: The Valleys Beyond

The Challenge is a 1952 Australian novel by E. V. Timms. It was the fifth in his Great South Land Saga of novels.

It is set in Australia during the 1850s.

== Plot ==
"On her deathbed, Susan Leigh's mother tells her a strange story, and gives her a strange task to carry out. As a result, Susan sets out to find her father, and justice. Background is Bass Strait, Melbourne, and the Victorian goldfields in the 1850s."

The Gubbys, Martha and Henry, make an appearance.

== Reception ==
The Northern Standard said "The yarn is better than it sounds and should prove popular with those who like historical romance told with some gusto against an Australian background."

The Adelaide News said it had "Plenty of action and rich, ripe melodrama, but a very readable yarn, nevertheless."

The Age said "the story moves swiftly. The chapters on the island are forceful, vivid and effective."

The Bulletin criticised "the artificial dialogue and cardboard characterisation" and "the mechanised devices by which Mr. Timms puts into the mouths of his characters long tracts of historical research."

== Radio adaptation ==
The novel was adapted for radio in fifteen minute episodes in 1953, read by Lyndall Barbour.
