= Maelstrom (Timms novel) =

1938 novel by E.V. Timms

- First edition
- Author: E. V. Timms
- Language: English
- Genre: historical
- Publisher: Angus and Robertson
- Publication date: 1938
- Publication place: Australia
- Pages: 465pp

Maelstrom is a novel by Australian writer E. V. Timms. It is set in 17th century France in the period following the death of Cardinal Richelieu.

The novel was revised and republished in 1955 as Ten Wicked Men.
