= James! Don't Be a Fool =

1927 Novel by E.V. Timms

- Author: E. V. Timms
- Language: English
- Publisher: Cornstalk Publishing
- Publication date: 1927
- Publication place: Australia
- Pages: 270pp

James! Don't be a Fool is an Australian comedy novel by E. V. Timms.

The novel led to a sequel, James! How Dare You.

== Plot ==
Two millionaire friends have plotted for years that their children, James and Elaine, should marry each other when they are of age, and when the plan is finally revealed they are amazed at the young people's reaction. Mutual misunderstandings lead to ridiculous complications.

== Adaptation ==
Film rights to the novel were purchased in 1933 by F.W. Thring of Effee Productions. John P. McLeod was hired to do the adaptation. However, no film resulted.

The novel was adapted for radio in 1940.
