= Hills of Hate (1926 film) =

1926 film

- Everyone's 1 December 1926
- Directed by: Raymond Longford
- Written by: E. V. Timms
- Based on: novel by E. V. Timms
- Starring: Dorothy Gordon
- Cinematography: Arthur Higgins
- Edited by: Mona Donaldson
- Production companies: Australasian Films; A Master Picture
- Release date: 27 November 1926
- Running time: 6,000 feet
- Country: Australia
- Languages: Silent film English intertitles

Hills of Hate is a 1926 Australian silent film directed by Raymond Longford, based on the debut novel of a similar name by E. V. Timms, who also wrote the screenplay. It is considered a lost film.

== Synopsis ==
A feud exists between two outback families, the Blakes and the Ridgeways, caused by Sam Ridgeway having married a woman Jim Blake was in love with. The feud goes on for over thirty years.

Blake's eldest son, also called Jim (Gordon Collingridge) returns from being away for ten years and falls in love with Ridgeway's daughter Ellen (Dorothy Gordon). Matters are complicated by Sam Ridgeway's villainous overseer, Cummins (Big Bill Wilson).

== Cast ==
- Dorothy Gordon as Ellen Ridgeway
- Gordon Collingridge as Jim Blake
- Big Bill Wilson as Black Joe Cummins
- Clifford Toone as Jim Blake Snr
- Kathleen Wilson as Peggy Blake
- Stanley Lonsdale as Stanley Ridgeway

== Original novel ==
E. V. Timms' original novel was published in 1925. It was Timms' first novel although he had sold short stories; he wrote it with the encouragement of his wife.

The Bulletin called it "A virile Australian story, though rough-cut and without pretence to literary quality".

== Production ==
Still from the film

Master Pictures bought the screen rights in January 1926 and Timms was hired to write the script. Everyones said it "presents a new type of Australian character set amid the wide open spaces, and should make an excellent photoplay. "

The studio would make it after two other outdoors adventures, The Pioneers and Tall Timber. Raymond Longford, who directed both Pioneers and Hills of Hate later said at the 1927 Royal Commission that both films "were selected by the directors of the combine; they were produced at an inadequate expense and in many cases the cast was chosen despite my protests. During the filming of these pictures I recognised that these pictures were absurdly cheap and inadequate to secure even an English market."

The films stars were Dorothy Gordon and Gordon Collingridge, who Everyones said was "well known to fans" having "established himself by his remarkable work opposite Lotus Thompson and now as a leading man he is greatly in demand." Kevin Gallagher was a recent arrival from Ireland. Gordon had worked in Hollywood for six years and did art direction on For the Term of His Natural Life (1927). She later became a radio commentator and newspaper columnist under the name of Andrea.

'Big' Bill Wilson was a professional boxer before being discovered by a casting agent at the Sydney Stadium and cast in Tall Timber (1926).

Longford said "the cast was engaged without consulting me. We were told that the attacks in Mr Hugh D McIntosh's newspapers would cease if we allotted the star part as he desired".

=== Shooting ===
In late March 1926 the unit left for Gloucester, New South Wales for a six-week shoot near Avon.

Filming was delayed by weather. Willian Thornton, juvenile lead, was injured on location but recovered by May. Studio work in Bondi started in late April and was finished by May.

Raymond Longford's son Victor served as associate producer.

== Reception ==
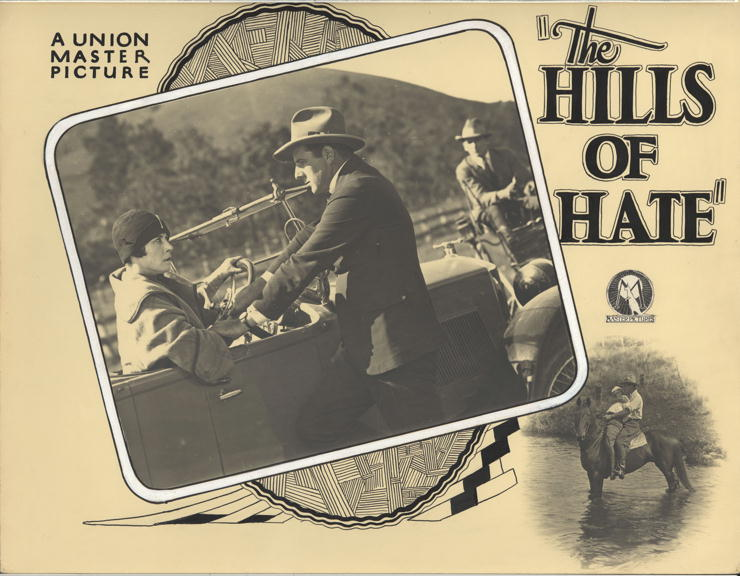
lobby card

The Northern Times said Collingridge played his role "with a skill remarkable in such a young actor, whilst Dorothy Gordon's portrayal is a powerfully competing proof of her ability".

Everyones said it was "chiefly remarkable for some excellent photography... There is plenty of fast action and some hard riding in this typical outback Australian story".

The film was not a success at the box office – although it was screening in cinemas as late as 1933 – and it was several years before Longford managed to direct another feature, The Man They Could Not Hang (1934). This turned out to be his last movie as director.

In July 1926 Australasian Pictures decided to move into bigger budgeted territory, making a version of For the Term of His Natural Life.
