= Red Mask =

1927 Novel by E.V. Timms

Red Mask: A Story of the Early Victorian Goldfields
- Author: E. V. Timms
- Language: English
- Genre: young adult historical
- Publication date: 1927
- Publication place: Australia

Red Mask: A Story of the Early Victorian Goldfields is an Australian historical novel by E. V. Timms, set at the time of the Victorian gold rush.
