= The Fury (Timms novel) =

1954 novel by E.V. Timms

- Cover of the first edition
- Author: E. V. Timms
- Language: English
- Series: Great South Land Saga
- Publisher: Angus and Robertson
- Publication date: 1954
- Publication place: Australia
- Media type: Print

The Fury is a 1954 Australian novel by E. V. Timms. It was the seventh in his Great South Land Saga of novels.

== Premise ==
A woman, Sally Mae Lome, grows up in the Australian outback. She loses her family in the Black Thursday bushfires of 1851 and winds up in the Eureka Rebellion.

== Reception ==
The book was a best seller.

The Age thought the book was "informative" but felt the incidents that preceded the start of the novel were more interesting than the novel itself.

The Bulletin said "Timms has his history, and his highflown romance, and his Arlene; and if one finds his Mr. and Mrs. Gubby, said on the dustjacket to be old favorites from earlier novels, quite unbearable in their homely Cockney humor, one must not forget that it is through their voices (however unbearable) that Mr. Timms expresses another strong-point of his novels —their patriotism."

The Daily Advertiser said "there is one grave fault to the book... the author's handling of the historical background. It is undigested history. The story is continually being held up in a 'pause, dear reader, while we consider' style of aside."

The Argus said "Timms is as gaudily colorful, melodramatic, and pro- fuse as ever. He calls it [his book] "The Fury," and makes a brave bid to live up to it. His style and sense of action, his exuberant delight with characters plucked straight from the corncob, make him a "natural" for Australian-style wild westerns."

== Radio version ==
The novel was serialised for radio in 1955, read out in episodes by Lyndall Barbour.
