= E. V. Timms =

Australian novelist and screenwriter

Edward Vivian Timms (1895–1960) was an Australian novelist and screenwriter. He was injured serving in the Gallipoli Campaign during World War I and was an unsuccessful soldier settler before turning to writing. He became a popular novelist, and also wrote scripts for films and radio. He served as an officer during World War II and was on duty the night of the Cowra breakout. He has been called "Australia's greatest historical novelist."

== Biography ==
Timms was born in Charters Towers, Queensland. His parents were William Henry Timms, a chemist from Worcester, England, and Bertha Bawden, from Victoria. After William Timms died in 1898, Bertha and Timms moved to Western Australia where she married a Presbyterian minister, Rev. Angus King. The family lived in Coolgardie and Fremantle (where Timms was taught at Fremantle Boys School by Thomas Blamey), before moving to Sydney.

== War service ==
Timms studied electrical engineering before being commissioned in the 1st Battalion, Australian Imperial Force, on 27 August 1914. He was promoted to lieutenant on 15 March 1915 and took part in the landing on Gallipoli on 25 April. He was wounded and invalided home.

Timms married Alma McRobert on 19 August 1916 and became a soldier settler. However, the experience was an unhappy one and Timms returned to the city.

== Writing success ==
Timms began to publish stories, then novels, and eventually became one of the most popular writers in Australia. He was best known for his historical romances, although he also wrote radio scripts, adventure stories, biographies and screenplays.

The wrote the script for The Squatter's Daughter and in 1935 Timms signed a contract to work with Charles Chauvel. He worked on the scripts for Uncivilised and Forty Thousand Horsemen. He did not work on the script for Chauvel's Rats of Tobruk which has been called an error on the filmmaker's part.

== Cowra break-out ==
During World War II Timms rejoined the army on 7 June 1940 and served until 21 June 1946. His service was spent in Australia and he finished with the rank of major. From October 1943 he was in charge of the Italians at the POW camp in Cowra. During the Cowra breakout he led C company in fending off a rear attack by the Japanese.

== Later years ==
After the war Timms resumed his career, but focused increasingly on novel writing. He began a 12-part series of novels set in Australia about the Gubbys, an immigrant family from England. In 1954 he moved to Budgewoi, near Gosford.

== Death ==
Timms died on 14 June 1960 of hypertensive heart disease. He was in the process of completing the eleventh novel in the saga, and his wife finished the job for him. She then wrote the 12th novel in the series on her own.

== Selected writings ==
=== Novels ===
- The Hills of Hate (1925) (adapted as the 1926 film Hills of Hate)
- James! Don't Be a Fool (1926)
- The Cripple in Black (1930)
- Whitehall (1930)
- The Falcon (1931)
- Alicia Deane (1932)
- Conflict (1934)
- Far Caravan (1935)
- Maelstrom (1938)
- Dark Interlude (1939)
- James! How Dare You (1940)
- Forever to Remain (1948) – first in his saga of Australian novels
- The Pathway of the Sun (1949)
- The Beckoning Shore (1950) (aka Convict Town)
- The Valleys Beyond (1951)
- The Challenge (1952)
- The Scarlet Frontier (1953)
- The Fury (1954)
- They Came from the Sea (1955)
- Ten Wicked Men (1955)
- Shining Harvest (1956)
- Robina (1958)
- The Big Country (1962)

=== Children's fiction ===
- The Valley of Adventure: A Story for Boys (1926)
- Red Mask: A Story of the Early Victorian Goldfields (1927)
- Lawrence, Prince of Mecca (1927)
- The Cities Under the Sea (1948)

=== Stories ===
- "The Four-Fifteen" in: The Australian Woman's Mirror, 1 September vol. 1 no. 41 1925; (p. 5, 58)
- "The Lamp on the Reef" in: The World's News, 31 August 1932; (p. 28–30)
- "Escape" in: The Bulletin, 16 December vol. 52 no. 2705 1931; (p. 32)
- "Marriage" in: The Bulletin, 22 July vol. 52 no. 2684 1931; (p. 38) The Bulletin, 29 January vol. 101 no. 5196 1980; (p. 299–300)
- "Pearls – and Ethics" in: The Bulletin, 19 May vol. 48 no. 2466 1927; (p. 57–58)
- "The End of the Day" in: The World's News, 26 October 1932; (p. 28–29)
- "Peace and Quiet" – Appears in: The Bulletin, 4 January vol. 54 no. 2760 1933; (p. 34)
- "Always To-Morrow"- appears in: The Bulletin, 10 May vol. 54 no. 2778 1933; (p. 33–34)
- "Music Hath Charms" — Appears in: The Bulletin, 27 December vol. 54 no. 2811 1933; (p. 39)
- "Moonstone" in: The World's News, 24 January 1934; (p. 26–27, 32.)
- "Red Earth" in: The World's News, 11 April 1934; (p. 6–7)
- "Settlin'" in: The World's News, 19 December 1934; (p. 4–5, 32.)
- "Forgery" in: The World's News, 23 October 1935; (p. 20–21)
- "Flood at Night" in: The World's News, 14 March 1934; (p. 20–23)
- "The Shaft" in: The World's News, 5 December 1934; (p. 11)
- "Four Pegs to a Claim" – in: The World's News, 3 June 1936; (p. 24–25, 33)
- "The Servant of Allah" in: The World's News, 8 April 1936; (p. 24–25, 32.)
- "The Smile" in: The World's News, 18 March 1936; (p. 24–25)
- "At the Nod of Allah" in: The World's News, 26 February 1936; (p. 24–25, 33, 38)
- "A Delicatessen Situation" – Appears in: The World's News, 2 December 1936; (p. 24–25, 32)
- "The Ghost Ship" – Appears in: The World's News, 3 February 1937; (p. 24–25, 38)
- "The Trap" – Appears in: The World's News, 10 February 1937; (p. 24–25)
- "That Man Gerrard" – Appears in: The Australian Women's Weekly, 20 March 1937; (p. 8, 14)
- "The Tramp of Armed Men" – Appears in: The World's News, 15 September 1937; (p. 8–9, 40.)
- "The Savage Way" – Appears in: The Australian Women's Weekly, 20 November 1937; (p. 8, 16, 22)
- "No Trespass" – appears in: The Australian Women's Weekly, 29 January 1938; (p. 6, 38, 54)
- "Green Jacket" – Appears in: The Australian Women's Weekly, 23 April 1938; (p. 8, 18, 20)
- "Woman on Board" – Appears in: The Australian Women's Weekly, 27 August 1938; (p. 8–9)
- "The Blue Pool Mystery" (1924)
- "Night Operator" (1945)

=== Screenplays ===
- Hills of Hate (1926)
- The Grey Glove (1928)
- The Squatter's Daughter (1933)
- Uncivilised (1936)
- Forty Thousand Horsemen (1940)

=== Radio plays ===
- Green Junk (1936) - a tale of the South China Seas
- Auf Wiedersehen (1936)
- The Dover Treaty (1936)
- The Crucifix (1936)
- The Clock Strikes Eight (1936)
- It Is Written (1936)
- The Lamp on the Sea (1936)
- The Shadow Man (1936)
- The Shadow Man Again (1936)
- Lionel Dare, BA, LLB (1936)
- The Valley of Adventure (1937)
- The Three Diggers (1938)
- The Cripple in Black (1939)
- James! Don't Be a Fool (1940)

== Complete copies of stories ==
- The Blue Pool Mystery – Complete serialisation of book in World News 9 Aug-8 Nov 1924 – Starting 9 August, 16 Aug, 20 Sept, 25 Oct, 8 Nov
- The End of the Day (1932)
- The Lamp on the Reef (1932)
- The Moonbi Outlaws – serialisation in 1932 – 10 Feb first installment
- Moonstone (1934)
- Flood at Night (1934)
- Red Earth (1934)
- Settlin' (1934)
- The Shaft (1934)
- Forgery (1935)
- At the Nod of Allah (1936)
- The Smile (1936)
- The Servant of Allah (1936)
- Four Pegs to a Claim (1936)
- Marry for Love (1936)
- A Delicatessen Situation (1936)
- The Ghost Ship (1937)
- That Man Gerrard (1937)
- The Tramp of Armed Men (1937)
- The Savage Way (1937)
- No Trespass (1937)
- Green Jacket (1938)
- Woman on Board (1938)

== Television miniseries ==
Luke's Kingdom, a joint British/Australian television miniseries which aired in 1976, was based on his works.
