= Howard Ellis Carr =

British composer and conductor

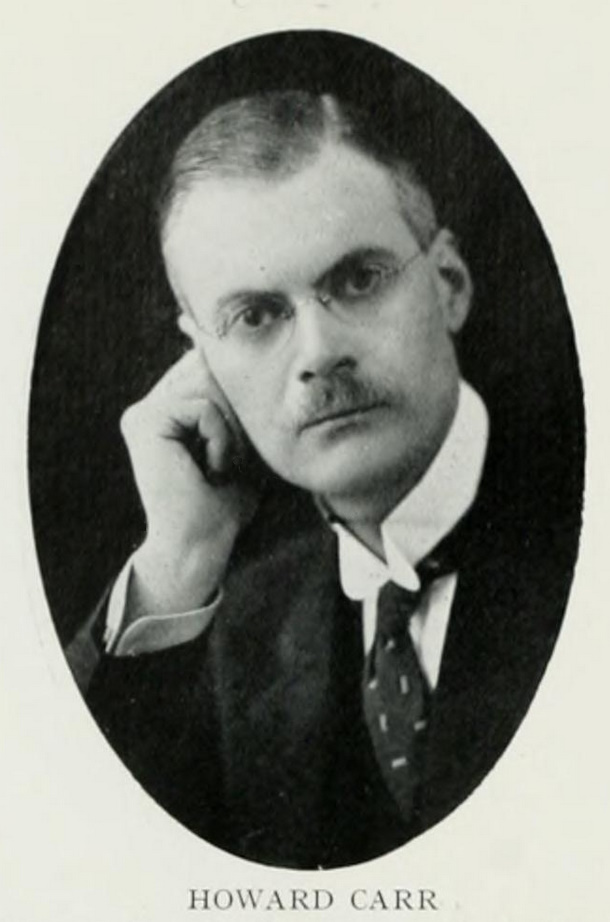
- Portrait of Howard Carr in March 1921.
- Born: Howard Ellis Carr; 26 December 1880; Manchester, England
- Died: 16 November 1960 (aged 79); Kensington, London, England
- Occupations: Composer, conductor, administrator

Howard Ellis Carr (26 December 1880 - 16 November 1960) was a British composer and conductor who worked in both Britain and Australia during his career. He was a prolific composer of theatre, operetta and light orchestral music, as well as orchestral works.

In his early career Carr worked as a conductor and musical director in theatres and touring productions, including working for two years in Australia. After returning to England in late 1909 he established a reputation as a specialist in theatrical orchestration. During World War I and afterwards his orchestral compositions were performed at the promenade concerts at Queen's Hall. In the 1920s he was conductor of the Municipal Orchestra at Harrogate in North Yorkshire. Carr returned to Australia in 1928. After several years as musical director in theatrical productions, he took on roles such as teaching at the Conservatorium of Music in Sydney and a conductor of the Royal Philharmonic Society. In the mid-1930s he worked on orchestration for radio broadcasts. Carr returned to England in 1938 where he worked for the BBC.

== Biography ==
=== Early years ===
Howard Ellis Carr was born on 26 December 1880 in Manchester, the eldest son of Edward Carr and Lillie (née Munkittrick). His maternal uncle was the theatre composer and conductor Howard Talbot. Young Howard was educated at St. Paul's School and the Central Technical College in Manchester. Carr studied civil engineering at the City and Guilds of London Institute.

Although he was trained as an engineer, Carr had a natural flair for music and decided to pursue that field of endeavour. In 1898, when he was aged eighteen, his uncle Howard Talbot secured a position for him at Her Majesty's Theatre in Carlisle in county Cumberland, northern England, in order for him to learn the job of musical director. He was in charge of an orchestra of eight players, who performed in full evening dress and white gloves. Whenever a visiting conductor attended the theatre, Carr played either the horn, cello or timpani, instruments upon which he had attained various degrees of proficiency.

For several years Carr was engaged with touring companies operated by the theatrical manager George Edwardes. In 1900 he conducted San Toy on a tour with one of the Edwardes' companies. In late 1903 Carr was appointed musical director of the Vaudeville Theatre, in London's West End, for the productions of The Cherry Girl, which opened in December 1903, and The Catch of the Season in 1904. He worked at the Criterion Theatre in 1905 and Wyndham's Theatre in 1906. Carr composed the music for the songs in Under the Greenwood Tree, a play acted by children and performed at the Scala Theatre in London in December 1906.

Carr was described as one with "a natural genius for music" and "one of those rarely-gifted people who, without definite instruction, can play many instruments". Though his principal instruments were the cello and the horn, but he was "more or less proficient upon every instrument" of the orchestra (except the bassoon and the flute for which he was unable to acquire "the exact embrouchure"). By 1907 Carr had written "several orchestral works of high merit". His second symphony (No. 2 in C major) was described as a "colossal work, essentially in the spirit of the moderns, and cram full of splendid themes". Carr was described as "an exceptionally brainy man, of somewhat retiring disposition".

In August 1907 it was reported that the Australian theatrical manager J. C. Williamson had engaged Howard Carr, "a young musical conductor of talent", as conductor of the Royal Comic Opera Company in Australia, replacing Andrew MacCunn (whose contract was about to expire).

=== Australia ===
Carr arrived in Melbourne on 11 September 1907 aboard the mail steamer Victoria together with two other passengers engaged by Williamson, the leading lady Beatrice Irwin and the stage manager Wybert Stamford. Soon after his arrival Carr took over from MacCunn for the performances of the musical comedy The Dairymaids at Her Majesty's Theatre. Carr was the musical director for the production of The Girls of Gottenberg which opened at Her Majesty's in October 1907. Soon after his arrival in Australia it was reported that Carr was engaged in writing an opera.

In November 1908, as part of a concert by the Sydney Symphony Orchestra in Sydney Town Hall, Carr conducted the first performance of his tone-picture 'The Black Opal', described as a composition showing "a large amount of ingenuity and daring".

Howard Carr and Beatrix ('Trixie') Tracey were married on 20 March 1909 at St. James' church in Sydney. Beatrix was a writer, raised in Melbourne, who had been a contributor to The Lone Hand, The Bulletin and other Australian journals, as well as a sub-editor of The Lone Hand.^{[B]}

Carr wrote a choral work called The Bush, with lyrics written by Frank Fox. The work, described as a "choric ode for chorus, baritone solo, and orchestra", was first performed on 30 June 1909 at the Sydney Town Hall by the Sydney Liedertafel, a male choir that had been established in the early 1880s.

During his two years in Australia, Carr composed interpolated numbers and ballets for many of the productions under his musical direction. He wrote ballet music for pantomimes and light operas, including Carnival of the Elements. Carr edited the production of The Lady Dandies, re-writing the finales and composing special ballet music for the play.

Carr conducted the Australian premiere of The Catch of the Season in Melbourne for J. C. Williamson prior to returning to England. His place in the Royal Comic Opera Company was taken by Andrew MacCunn (who he had replaced in September 1907). On 5 October 1909 Howard and Beatrix Carr departed from Melbourne for England aboard the steamer Osterley.

=== England ===
After returning to London Carr was initially employed as the musical assistant to Hans Richter at the Royal Opera House in Covent Garden. He was the assistant conductor for the 1910 production of The Ring at Covent Garden.

There were indications that Beatrix was experiencing home-sickness soon after arriving in England. After her initial enthusiasm about being in London, in June 1910 she wrote: "You cannot feel in London as you felt at home... London has killed some faculty of joyousness in you". In October 1911 the couple's only child was born at Richmond in South London, a boy named Eustace Edward Carr.

Carr was appointed as one of the conductors, together with Hamish MacCunn (brother of Andrew MacCunn), on the four-month tour of the United Kingdom of Thomas Beecham's Opera Comique company, commencing in September 1910. He undertook two tours with the company and replaced Hamish MacCunn as musical director of the company.

During the war years and several years afterwards, as a specialist in theatrical orchestration, Carr was the musical director and conductor at various theatres in London: the Empire in 1914, the Adelphi in 1915-1916, the Prince of Wales' in 1916 and the Empire in 1917-1919. He also worked at the Gaiety, Apollo and Lyric theatres. A short ballet composed by Carr, In the Jungle, was included in a new revue called Topsy-Turvy, which opened at the Empire Theatre in August 1917. Carr composed the music for the songs in the operetta Master Wayfarer by J. E. Harold Terry, performed at the Apollo Theatre in December 1917. He wrote additional numbers for The Lilac Domino and Shanghai during 1918 and collaborated in the composing of Gay Bohemia and The Girl for the Boy in 1919. Carr was a part composer of Shanghai which opened in August 1918 at the Theatre Royal in Drury Lane, the production in which the Australian actress Dorothy Brunton achieved her breakthrough success in London.

Carr was appointed as the honorary secretary of the Musical Conductors' Association (MCA), formed in London in March 1916 "amidst xenophobic fervour" aroused by the war against Germany. The body was formed "for the purpose of improving and consolidating the position of British conductors". Carr also held the position of honorary treasurer of the MCA for a time and served on the executive council. The immediate post-war years in England was a period of economic depression and protectionist fervour. An article written by Carr, published in the Daily Mail in May 1919, was titled 'Fight the Hun in Music'. Carr urged that the war-time conditions that had ensured all-British orchestras and British repertory should be maintained. He wrote that "composers, conductors, and players are coming out of khaki... and if the nation gives them the proper backing they will defeat the Hun in the theatre and concert-room as completely as he was beaten on the gas-soaked fields of France and Flanders". Carr also served on the committee of the Society of Authors, Playwrights and Composers and was a director of the Royal Philharmonic Society in London.

Carr conducted at the Ambassadors Theatre in 1919 and returned to the Empire in 1920. One notable success was The Rebel Maid, an operetta by Montague Phillips, which Carr conducted for 114 performances from March 1921 at the Empire Theatre. Songs by Carr from some of the shows he contributed to during the 1920s were recorded on the His Master's Voice Red label.

Orchestral works composed by Carr were performed at the promenade concerts at Queen's Hall each year from 1917 to 1925. Carr's suite called The Jolly Roger (a piratical fantasy), was included in the Promenade Concerts season at Queen's Hall commencing in August 1917. A new work by Carr, Three Sketches for Orchestra: Three Heroes, was included in the 1918 Promenade Concerts at Queen's Hall. The first performance of Three Heroes "excited so much applause that, after taking seven or eight recalls, Mr. Carr, who conducted, was obliged to allow the last movement to be played again". The prelude The Shrine in the Wood and the symphonic march The Sun God were performed during the 1925 promenade season, conducted by Carr.

In 1921 Carr was appointed conductor of the Municipal Orchestra at Harrogate, in North Yorkshire, succeeding Julian Clifford after his death. He remained at Harrogate for two years, performing eight concerts a week, including a symphony concert on Thursday afternoons. He founded the Harrogate Choral Society. The orchestra performed music from light to serious, sometimes programming unusual repertoire (for example, on 21 December 1922 he conducted a performance of Lilian Elkington's tone poem Out of the Mist). Harrogate had many boarding schools and every fortnight during the school terms Carr presented a programme for children at the Royal Hall, featuring explanations of the instruments of the orchestra and the performance of "short works by great composers".

In 1928 Carr received an offer from the J. C. Williamson company to return to Australia, which he accepted.

=== Return to Australia ===
In September 1928 Howard and Trixie Carr arrived at Melbourne from London aboard the steamer Cathay. Carr took up the position of musical director for J. C. Williamson Ltd. in the production of the operetta The Desert Song featuring Stephanie Deste, which premiered on 15 September 1928 at His Majesty's Theatre in Melbourne. By late October 1928 Carr was in Sydney as musical director of the J. C. Williamson production of The Vagabond King at Her Majesty's Theatre.

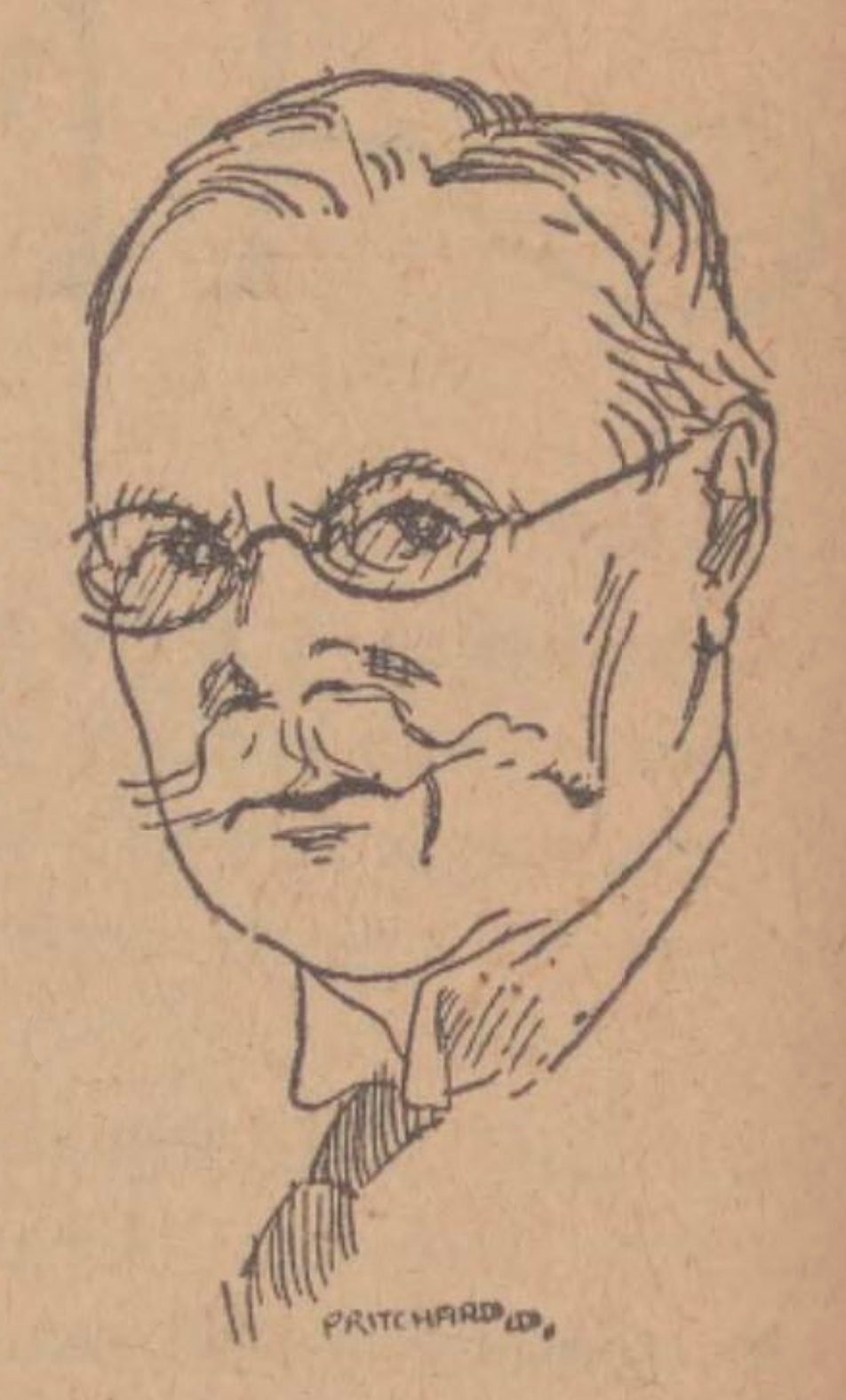
Sketch of Howard Carr, published in The Wireless Weekly, 27 December 1929.

Beatrix Tracey Carr died on 11 June 1929 at South Yarra in Melbourne, "after an illness lasting several months".

In 1930, after the termination of his contract with J. C. Williamson Ltd., Carr settled in Sydney. He wrote newspaper articles, made radio broadcasts on the subject of the orchestra and conducted several broadcast performances of his operetta Master Wayfarer. Carr wrote music for the Chinese play The Circle of Chalk and a production of J. M. Barrie's Peter Pan by the Independent Theatre.

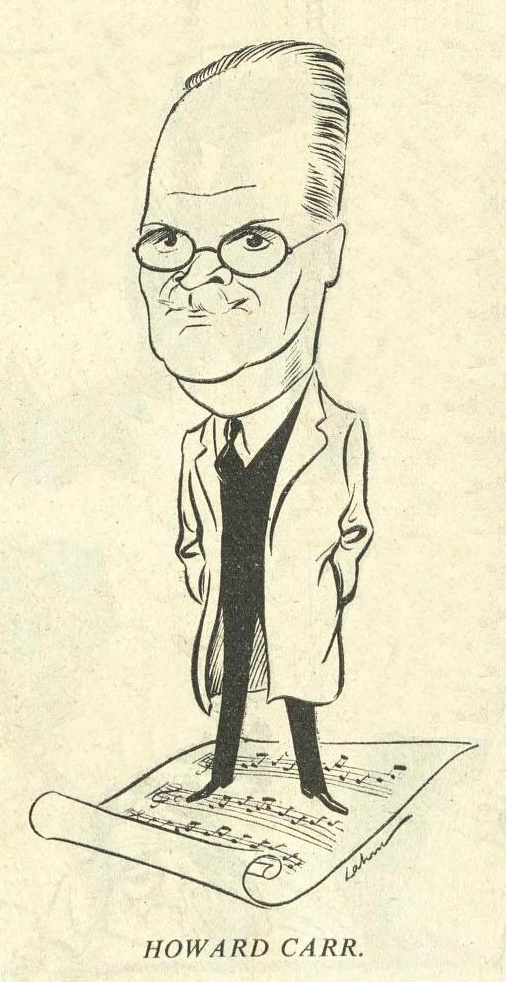
Caricature of Howard Carr, published in The Bulletin, 8 July 1936.

In September 1931 Carr took on the role of conductor for Sydney's Royal Philharmonic Society, replacing Gerald Peachell who had resigned to return to England. Carr was initially engaged as acting conductor and directed the Society's Christmas 1931 performance of The Messiah. Carr was appointed as the Society's permanent conductor in 1932. In the midst of the Great Depression, the Philharmonic Society was being affected by a lack of public support, a decline in subscriber numbers and low morale amongst its members. To conserve funds Carr minimised the hiring of professional musicians for the orchestra and attempted to utilise mainly amateur musicians. Despite these efforts the Society was forced to suspend its rehearsals and performances for most of 1933 due to a lack of funds. In 1934 the members of the Philharmonic Society voted to suspend its activities. With 1935 being the fiftieth anniversary year of the Royal Philharmonic Society, the milestone was celebrated in November 1935 with a restructured orchestra performing Haydn's The Seasons. Despite the goodwill from the public during its anniversary year, the Society's amateur orchestra was performing poorly and concerts were not well attended. The Philharmonic Society approached the government-funded Australian Broadcasting Commission (ABC), formed in July 1932, seeking assistance in the form of personnel from the Commission's orchestra and choirs. The collaboration was approved, with ABC members augmenting the Society's chorus and orchestra in many subsequent concert programmes.

In December 1932 Carr orchestrated and conducted the first staging of the musical Collits' Inn by Varney Monk, praised by the Sydney Morning Herald as "an Australian opera".

Carr made an appearance as an extra in the Cinesound film about the exploits of the Kelly Gang, When the Kellys Rode, the first adaptation of the Kelly story with sound. He played the leader of a country orchestra in an inn scene.^{[A]}

From about February 1934, during Alfred Hill's year-long leave of absence from the New South Wales State Conservatorium in Sydney, Carr took his classes in musical theory and rehearsed and conducted the students' orchestra. In September 1935 the musical Love Wins Through by Adrian Ross and C. B. Fernald with music by Carr was performed by the Regal Operatic Society at the Sydney Conservatorium.

In May 1936 Carr was appointed as the musical editor for radio transmissions by the ABC, "responsible for orchestrations and adaptations of major works in both serious and lighter fields of music".

Carr resigned as conductor of the Royal Philharmonic Society in April 1938. He returned to England in July 1938.

=== Back to England ===
After returning to England in 1938 Carr was employed by the British Broadcasting Corporation (BBC) as an orchestrator and arranger. He worked with the BBC Theatre Orchestra throughout World War II.

In the 1940s several films used songs, uncredited, for which Carr had composed or arranged the music. In 1947 the British comedy An Ideal Husband used the melody of 'After the Ball', from the musical comedy A Trip to Chinatown, as arranged by Carr. In 1948 the British drama The Winslow Boy used two of Carr's songs, 'Snookey Pookey Twaddle' and 'You Can't Help Winning', uncredited.

In 1950, on the occasion of Carr's seventieth birthday, he conducted a concert produced by the BBC of his own works.

Howard Carr died in a hospital in Kensington, London, on 16 November 1960, aged 79.

The 'Howard Carr Prize' for composition was founded in 1964 at the Royal Academy of Music. The prize was made possible by a gift by Ruth Wittmann and was awarded to students up until the 1980s.

== Music ==
Carr's theatre music included musical contributions and additional songs for light operettas such as A Chinese Honeymoon, The Girl for the Boy (Duke of York's Theatre, 1919), The Blue Kitten (Gaiety, December 1925), Under the Greenwood Tree, Charles Cuvillier's The Lilac Domino (1918 London revival) and Shanghai by Isidore Witmark and William Duncan, the latter first performed in August 1918 at the Theatre Royal, Drury Lane. His own operettas include The Crystal Gazer (1924) and (produced in Australia) Love Wins Through (1935) and The Lady in the Moon (1936). He also provided incidental music for plays including The Potter Diamond and The Master Wayfarer.

His orchestral works include two symphonies (No. 1 in E minor, No. 2 in C major, written circa 1903-5). The manuscripts were donated to the British Library in 1962. He also composed various orchestral suites, overtures and genre pieces which were often performed at The Proms between 1917 and 1925, including The Jolly Roger (overture), The Jovial Huntsmen (rondo), The Shrine in the Wood (Prelude) and The Sun God (symphonic march).

Of these the most popular was Three Heroes, a suite commemorating World War I heroes Michael John O'Leary, Captain Oates and Reginald Warneford, the final movement including a musical depiction of a Zeppelin air raid. This received several performances in the days immediately following the Armistice, and was played at the Proms in 1918, 1920 and 1924. The four movement ballet suite Carnival of the Elements was popular enough to be published by W. Paxton & Co. The four movements were described in the following terms: "'Air' is a light rhythmic scherzo, and "Earth" is a valse lento movement; "Water" a peaceful stream that wends its way in terms of melody; but "Fire" demands the best from any orchestra, not so much for the notation as for the time, which is a 9/8 presto furioso". Reviewing a performance at the Hastings British Music Festival in 1921, Allan Biggs described the style as "enough sensationalism, but little subtlety".

Carr also composed choral works, such as The Bush and Ode to the Deity, and staged a dramatized version of Mendelssohn's Elijah in London (1933) and in Australia (1938). Some of his songs were published by Stainer & Bell. He managed to replicate the success of Three Heroes during the Second World War with another patriotic piece, the Sir Walter Raleigh overture, premiered by the BBC Symphony Orchestra in June 1940.

== Orchestral works ==
- Symphony No.1 in E minor
- Symphony No.2 in C major
- The Black Opal (tone-picture) (1908)
- The Jolly Roger (orchestral suite; 'Aboard the Lugger', 'The Captive Lady', 'Ashore at Yucatan') (1917)
- Sketches for Orchestra: Three Heroes: O'Leary V.C., Captain Oates, Warneford V.C. (1918)
- The Jovial Huntsman (rondo) (1919)
- Fun and Frolic (scherzo)
- The Shrine in the Wood (prelude) (1925)
- The Sun God (symphonic march) (1925)
- The Adventurers (symphonic march)
- Reverie for String Orchestra
- Sir Walter Raleigh (overture) (1940)
- In the Orchard (interlude)
- Australian Bush Idyll (intermezzo)
- Ballet Suite No.1 : Dance of the Maidens, 'Dance of the Cannibals', 'Fruitless Persuasion', 'Cannibal Feast'
- Ballet Suite No.2 : The Cavalier: 'Revels', 'Flirtation', 'Serenade', 'Brawl'
- Ballet Suite No.3 : On the Briny: 'A Last Step with Polly and Sal', 'The Shanty-man's Song', 'The Sentimental Bo'sun', 'Jolly Sea Dogs'
- Ballet Suite No.4 : The Carnival of the Elements: 'The Air-spirits', 'The Water-fairies', 'The Fire-devils', 'The Rising of the Sun'
- Ballet, Moths and Butterflies
- Ballet, Australian Birds

== Notes ==
A.The film When the Kellys Rode was released in New Zealand in August 1934. The film was banned in New South Wales on the grounds that it glorified bushrangers and disparaged the police. After certain cuts were made, it was released for screening in Victoria and other Australian states in October 1934.

B.Beatrix ('Trixie') Dagmar Tracey was the youngest child of Richard Nicholas Dowling Treacey and Madeleine Amelia (née Walton), born on 29 August 1888 at Cheltenham, Victoria. Her father was the Assistant Government Statist of Victoria. The spelling of the family name changed from 'Treacey' to 'Tracey' by the early 1900s. As a young woman Trixie Tracey was "one of the sparkling lights in Melbourne's art and literary set". As a 'flapper' she "made Melbourne sit up and take notice by promenading The Block in skirts up to her knees when other girls were wearing theirs nearly long enough to touch the ground". 'Trixie' had experience on the stage, having appeared in Cyrano de Bergerac in Melbourne. Tracey also had "a natural gift for journalism". As a writer Beatrix Tracey was best known for her series of articles, 'The Explorations in Industry', published in The Lone Hand. The seven articles explored aspects of women's work in a variety of contexts, for which Tracey undertook extensive research including working "for some time in a pickle factory".
