= Collits' Inn (musical) =

Australian musical play

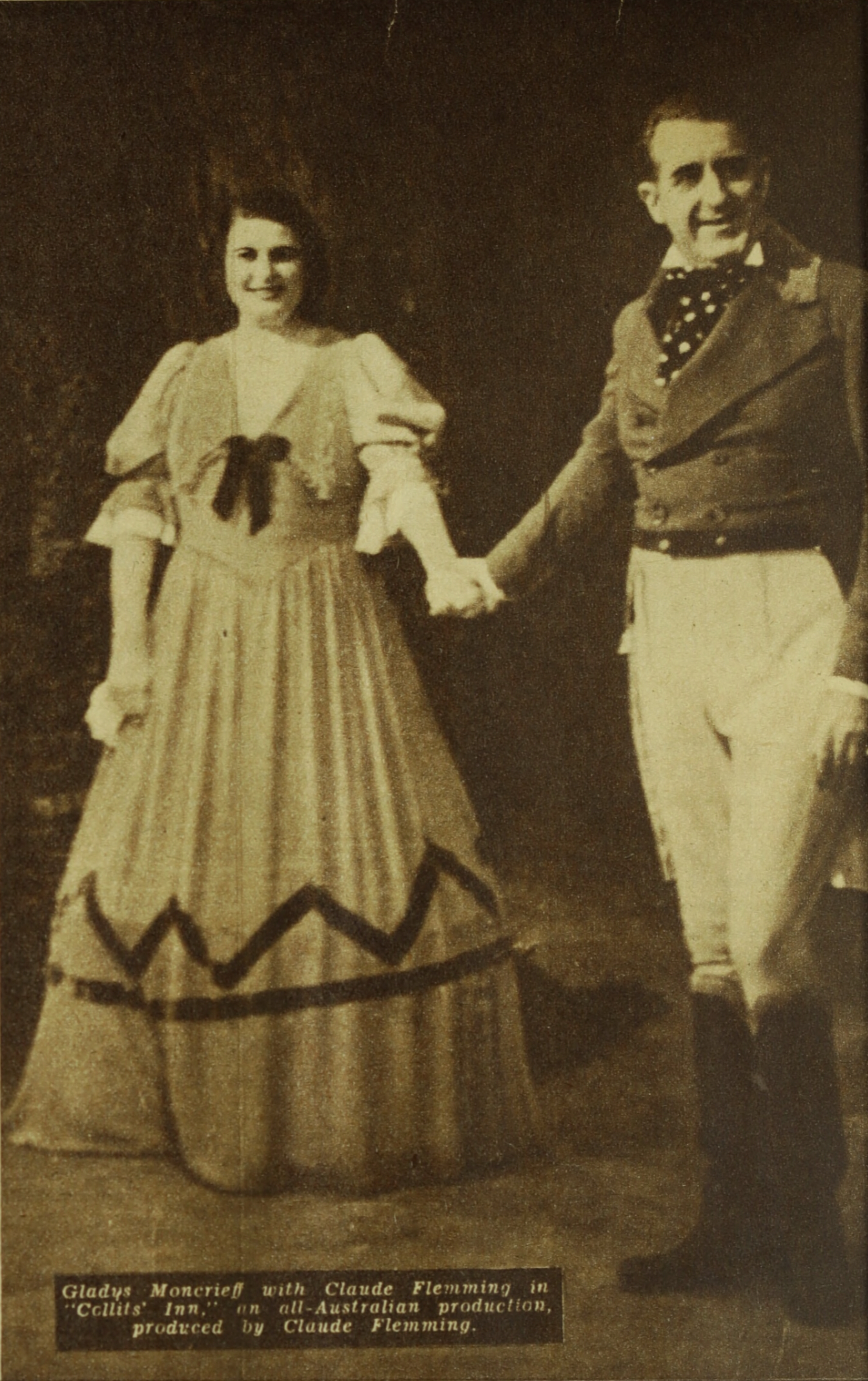
- Gladys Moncrieff with Claude Flemming performing Collits' Inn in 1933 at the Princess Theatre in Melbourne
- Music: Varney Monk
- Lyrics: Varney Monk
- Book: T. Stuart Gurr
- Productions: 1932 Savoy Theatre Sydney; 1933 Princess Theatre Melbourne; 1934 New Tivoli Sydney

Collits' Inn is an Australian musical play with music by Varney Monk. Its first staging was in December 1932 at the Savoy Theatre in Sydney. The 1933 Melbourne production at the Princess Theatre was the first fully professional production, presented by F. W. Thring and starring Gladys Moncrieff, George Wallace, Claude Flemming and Campbell Copelin. Wallace's role was created especially for him. It is generally considered the first commercially successful Australian musical, and it was praised by the Sydney Morning Herald as "an Australian opera".

The text was published by Currency Press in 1990.

== Plot ==
Love and drama at a roadside tavern in the Blue Mountains owned by former convict Pierce Collits, who built the eponymous inn on land granted to him at Hartley Vale in exchange for helping supervise construction of a road from Penrith to the western plans.

Pierce's daughter Mary is in love with a young officer John Lake, commander of a gang of convicts. However her father hates officers and refuses to give his blessing.

Bushranger Robert Keane is in love with Mary. He has the support of Pierce who is under obligation to the bushranger.

Keane hits Mary and Lake kills him. Lake is ordered home and becomes a baron. When he returns he discovers Mary has lost her memory through an accident. However she regains it and all ends happily.

Comic relief is provided by the inn roustabout, Dandy Dick, who is in love with Sally the barmaid but faces competition from barman Toby.

== Songs ==
- "A Laugh and a Kiss" by John Lake
- "Stay While the Stars Are Shining" by John Lake and Mary Collits
- "Outlaws Song" by Robert Keane
- "Sweet William"
- Aboriginal chant
- "Australia" – the finale with John Lake and Mary Collits
- "Blue Mountains"
- "The chaperone"
- Corroboree ballet
- "Dangerous Dandy Dick"
- "Drinking song"
- "Duddawarra River"
- "Happy with you"
- "How I love you"
- "I'll wait for my true love"
- "Last year"
- "Making memories"
- "The man in the cabbage tree hat"
- "Melos"
- "My desire"
- "My valentine"
- "Next year"
- "Only you"
- "The Redcoats"
- "The road song"
- "The rouseabout"
- "Sally at the sliprail"
- "See what loves done to me"
- "Some distant day"
- "Square dance"
- "That's what love does to me"
- "They're in love"
- "This year"
- "Waltz ballet"
- "We're singing of Australia"

== Production history ==
=== Development ===
In 1932 Mosman neighbours Varney Monk and Thomas Stuart Gurr collaborated on a musical together in order to submit it to a competition for an original operetta or musical play. The competition was held by Nathalie Rosenwax, a prominent Sydney singing teacher.

The musical was based on Collits Inn, a real life inn established near Lithgow on the road from Sydney to Bathurst built by Irish convict Pierce Collits. Monk and her husband Cyril, a violinist, had spent several holidays there and heard the story about how Pierce Collits daughter Amelia had been in love with a soldier. It is doubtful this story was actually true but it inspired Monk to write a musical around it.

The musical won second prize in the competition, losing to The Island of Pines, but it was Collits Inn which Nathalie Rosenwax decided to produce with her students in lead roles. They did five performances at the Savoy Theatre from 5 December 1932, starring professional soprano Rene Maxwell as Mary Collit and radio personality Jack Winn in support. Cyril Monk led the orchestra, which was conducted by Howard Ellis Carr, who also orchestrated the work. The musical was revised and performed again in March 1933 at the Mosman Town Hall. It was also broadcast on ABC radio in June of that year. However it was turned down for professional production by J.C. Williamsons Ltd.

=== F. W. Thring ===
Varney Monk sent the script to Frank Thring and went down to Melbourne to play him the score. Thring was enthusiastic about the show and decided to produce it professionally. He hired an all star cast, putting Gladys Moncrieff, Australia's most popular star of light opera under a 12-month contract to play the lead. He also brought back two Australians from overseas to appear opposite her, Robert Chisholm and Claude Fleming, and hired the most popular comic of the day, George Wallace, to play the comic support role of Dandy Dan.

Wallace's presence in the cast meant his part was expanded and he was given as many songs as Glady Moncrieff; in addition, parts were found for his regular collaborators, Marshall Crosby and John Dobbie. Extra lures to the theatre-going audience was a revolving stage, the first of its kind used in Australia, and the performance of an aboriginal corroboree at the beginning of Act Two.

The resulting production debuted in December 1933. It was a widely publicised occasion, attended by the state premier and lord mayor and the first act was broadcast live on Radio 3KZ. "All this excitement over an Australian show with an all-Australian cast", wrote Thring's biographer, Peter Fitzpatrick. "Nothing like it had happened before. Frank [Thring]... must have felt like a king... It was certainly the most triumphant night of his life."

The show was a big success, receiving excellent reviews and playing for sixteen weeks and over a hundred performances at the Princess. It went to Sydney for eight weeks, then had a three-week return season in Melbourne in October 1934.

The success of the musical encouraged Thring to expand his theatrical productions. Thring commissioned Monk to write a sequel, The Cedar Tree and also revived The Beloved Vagabond.

=== Cast of 1933 Princess Theatre production ===
- Gladys Moncrieff as Mary Collits
- Marshall Crosby as Pierce Collits
- Robert Chisholm as John Lake
- Claude Flemming as Robert Keane
- George Wallace as Dandy Dick
- Phyllis Baker as Sandy
- John Dobbie as Toby

== Proposed film version ==
Thring intended to make a movie out of the play but died in 1936 before he had the chance to shoot little more than sound tests. A six-minute sound test of Gladys Moncrieff and Robert Chisolm singing 'While the Stars Are Shining', with a spoken introduction by Frank Harvey survives. Harvey had reportedly written a screenplay.

== Radio adaptation ==
The musical was adapted for radio by the ABC in 1943 and 1951.

== Legacy ==
In the words of theatre historian John Thompson:

Collits’ Inn was hailed as a unique Australian musical. It was not the first theatrical production to use Australian settings, nor was it, as is commonly claimed, the first Australian musical... [It] was not The Great Australian Musical many hoped it would be. But it proved that Australian creativity and talent could produce an original work that Australian audiences wanted to see and was judged worthy of a place on the world stage.
