= The Cedar Tree (musical) =

Australian musical

- Music: Varney Monk
- Lyrics: Varney Monk; Helene Barclay
- Book: Edmund Barclay
- Productions: 1934 Princess Theatre Melbourne; 1935 Criterion Theatre Sydney

The Cedar Tree is an Australian musical play produced in the wake of the success of Collits' Inn. The 1934 Melbourne production at the Princess Theatre was presented by F. W. Thring and starred Gladys Moncrieff.

== Background ==
It was inspired by a visit Varney Monk made to the town of Windsor in New South Wales.

Edmund Barclay had written a number of radio revues for the ABC and he was enlisted to write a musical. He said:

The story is not historical, but original, and worked out against a historical background. The ‘Australian atmosphere’ is not thrust at the audience in large chunks, and there are no kangaroos hopping across the stage, and, unless the producer decides otherwise, there will not be one single solitary pair of whiskers. The comedy part is of ‘The Flying Pieman,’ a well- known identity of the Hawkesbury Road, who caused a great deal of comment. He used to think nothing of carrying a live goat on his shoulders from Parramatta to Windsor for a trifling wager. We have endeavored to make the comedy an integral part of the plot, and not just put in as an afterthought.

The part of the Pieman was devised for George Wallace who had been in Collitts Inn. However Wallace was busy making films so Alfred Firth played it instead.

== Reception ==
Reviews were positive however it failed to repeat the success of Collits Inn.

Everyones said it "abounds in delightful melodies for which Mrs Varney Monk can take a bow. Gladys Moncrieff renders her numbers in excellent voice, her duet with Russell Scott, “It Had To Be,” earned great applause, while all the songs registered' with the audience... “The Cedar Tree” from start to finish is excellent entertainment, the whole cast has worked hard to make it a success, and F. W. Thring deserves all possible in this respect."

== 1934 radio adaptation ==
Wireless Weekly 28 Dec 1934

The musical was performed on Australian radio on 29 December 1934.

== Plot ==
A story of cedar cutters and boat builders on the Hawkesbury River in the 1840s. It involves two acts and eight scenes with a gap of two years between the acts.

A woman carries on her deceased father's business of building ships built from cedar trees. Her spoilt younger brother bails up one of his sister's lovers on the highway to get money to pay debts. The lover tries to save him from prison and returns the money while disguised as a notorious bushranger. However the Flying Pieman arrives, thinks he's a real bushranger and tackles him. The lover leaves town to avoid being arrested. The younger brother writes a confession and hides it in the hole of an old cedar tree. It is discovered tow

== Songs ==
- "The Cedar Tree"
- "We Never Really Meant Goodbye"
- "How I Love You"
- "It Had to Be"
- "Jolly Roger"
- "March of the Pioneers"
- "Cupid Follows the Mole"
- "Hawkesbury River Road"
