= Princess Theatre (Melbourne) =

Theatre in Melbourne, Victoria, Australia

Coordinates: 37.810725°S 144.972169°E

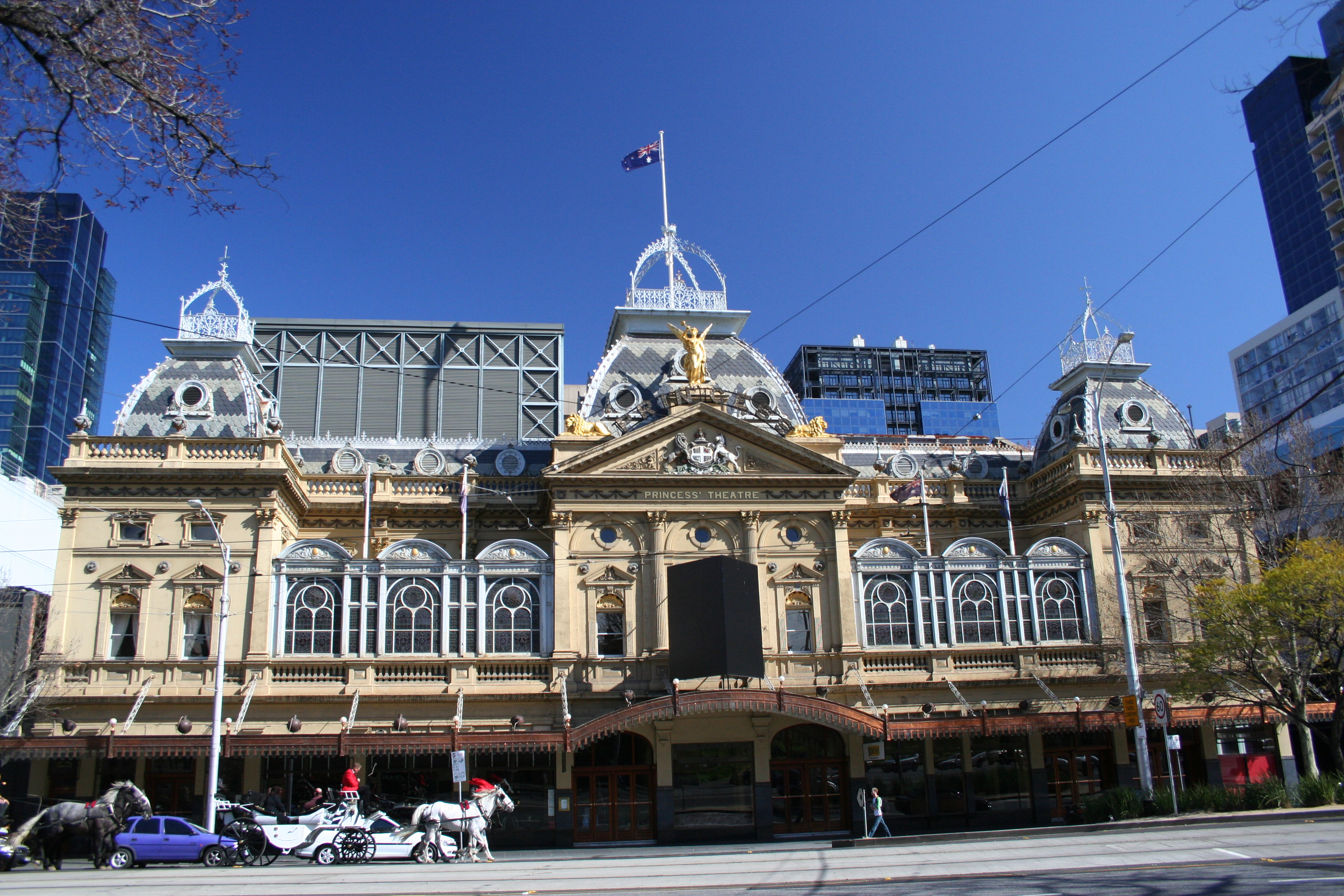
- Spring Street facade
- Interactive map of Princess Theatre
- Address: 163 Spring Street; Melbourne, Victoria, Australia
- Owner: Marriner Group
- Capacity: 1,452
- Designation: Victorian Heritage Register

Construction
- Opened: 1854
- Rebuilt: 1886
- Architect: William Pitt

Website
- www.marrinergroup.com.au

Victorian Heritage Register
- Official name: Princess Theatre
- Type: State Registered Place
- Designated: October 9, 1974
- Reference no.: H0093
- Heritage Overlay number: HO740

The Princess Theatre, originally Princess's Theatre, is a 1452-seat theatre in Melbourne, Victoria, Australia. Established in 1854 and rebuilt in 1886 to a design by noted Melbourne architect William Pitt, it is the oldest surviving entertainment site on mainland Australia. Built in an elaborate Second Empire style, it reflects the opulence of the "Marvellous Melbourne" boom period, and had a number of innovative features, including state of the art electric stage lighting and the world's first sliding ceiling, which was rolled back on warm nights to give the effect of an open-air theatre.

Located on Spring Street in Melbourne's East End Theatre District, the theatre building is listed by the National Trust of Australia and is on the Victorian Heritage Register.

== Astley's Amphitheatre ==
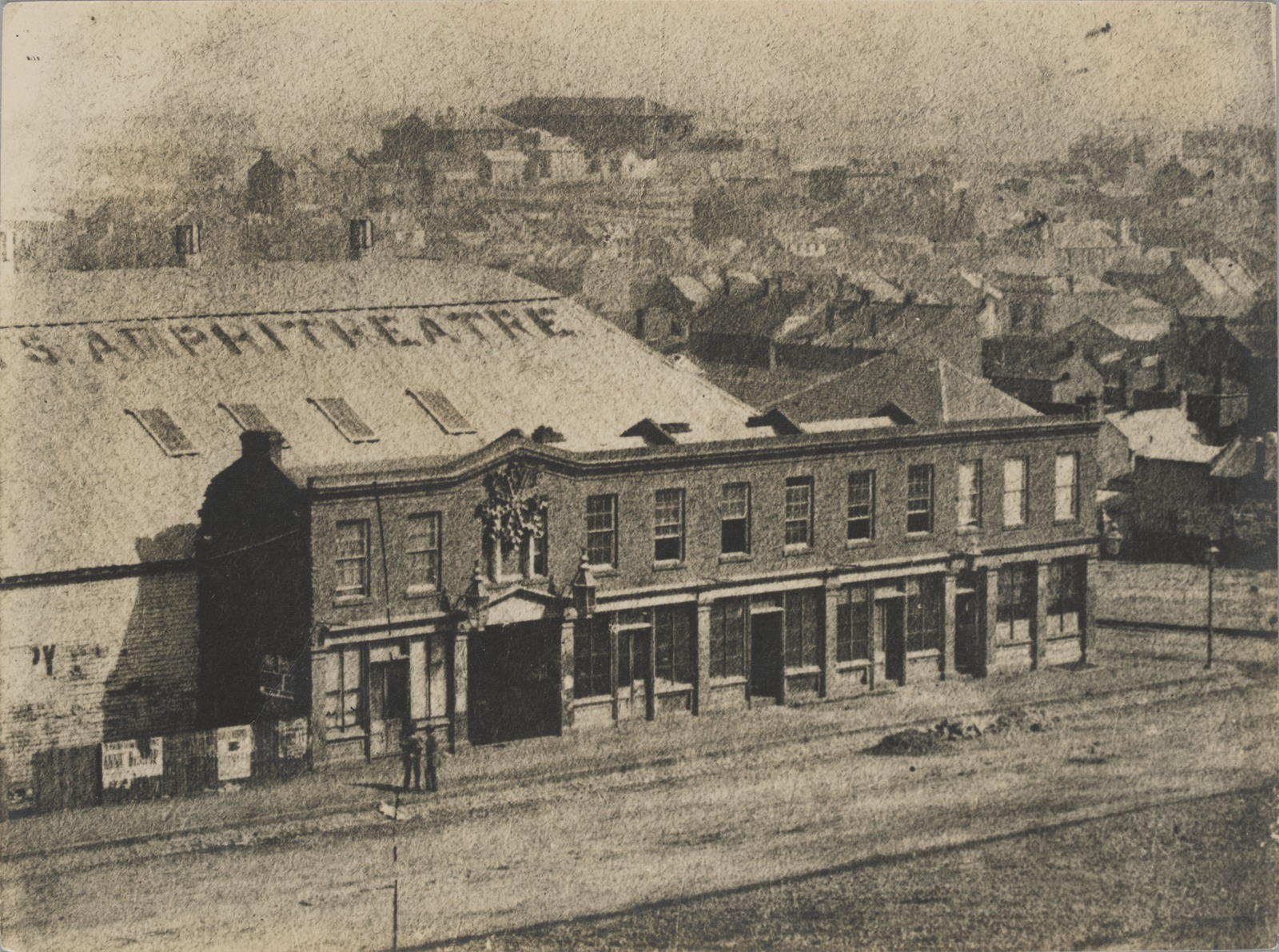
Astley's Amphitheatre, c. 1850s

The site of today's Princess Theatre dates back to the gold rush period in 1854 as being a notorious entertainment district, when the Irish-American entrepreneur Tom Mooney constructed a barn-like structure called Astley's Amphitheatre.

It featured a central ring for equestrian entertainment and a stage at one end for dramatic performances. Its name echoed that of Astley's Amphitheatre, near Westminster Bridge, London. Its first lessee was George Lewis who staged a series of "grand concerts" there from 11 September 1854. Lewis was forced into insolvency within a year and Mooney divested himself of the amphitheatre and the adjacent Mazeppa Hotel to one Samuel Boyle.

It was later leased by the actor-manager George Coppin, who had already established himself as an actor at the Queen's Theatre, and would go on to build the Olympic Theatre (known as the "Iron Pot") on the corner of Exhibition and Lonsdale Streets (the future site of the Comedy Theatre), build the Haymarket Theatre and Apollo Music Hall, and lease (and eventually rebuild) the Theatre Royal in Bourke Street.

== Princess's Theatre ==
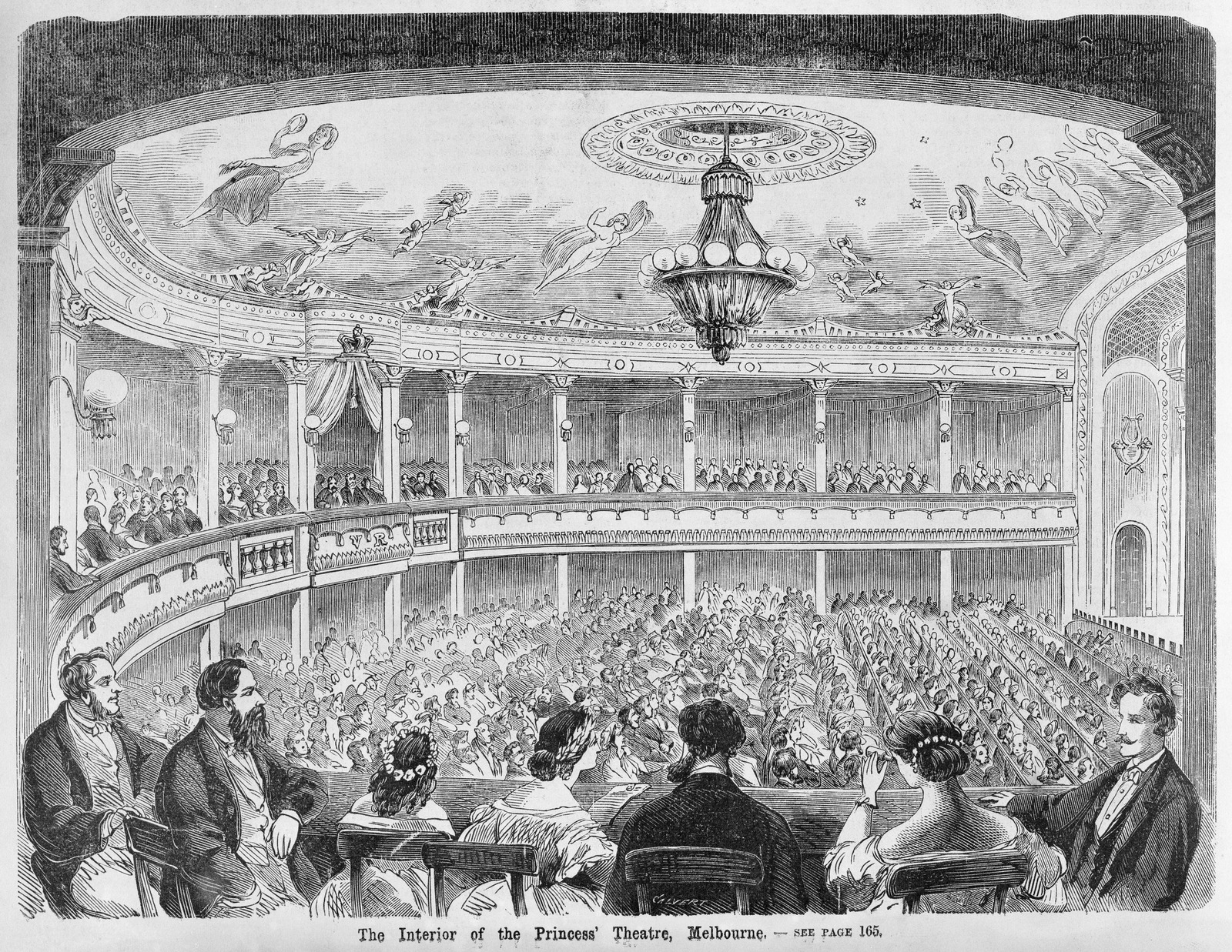
The Interior of the Princess Theatre, Melbourne, 1865. Samuel Calvert (State Library Victoria)

In 1857, the amphitheatre was extensively renovated and the facade extended, re-opening on 16 April as the Princess's Theatre and Opera House. Its first manager, John Black, founded the Theatre Royal two years earlier.

In September 1877 L. M. Bayless, who had the lease on the Queen's Theatre, Sydney took a long term lease on the Princess's Theatre, and had it extensively refitted, and reopened 28 December 1877 as the New Princess Theatre.

== The Princess Theatre ==
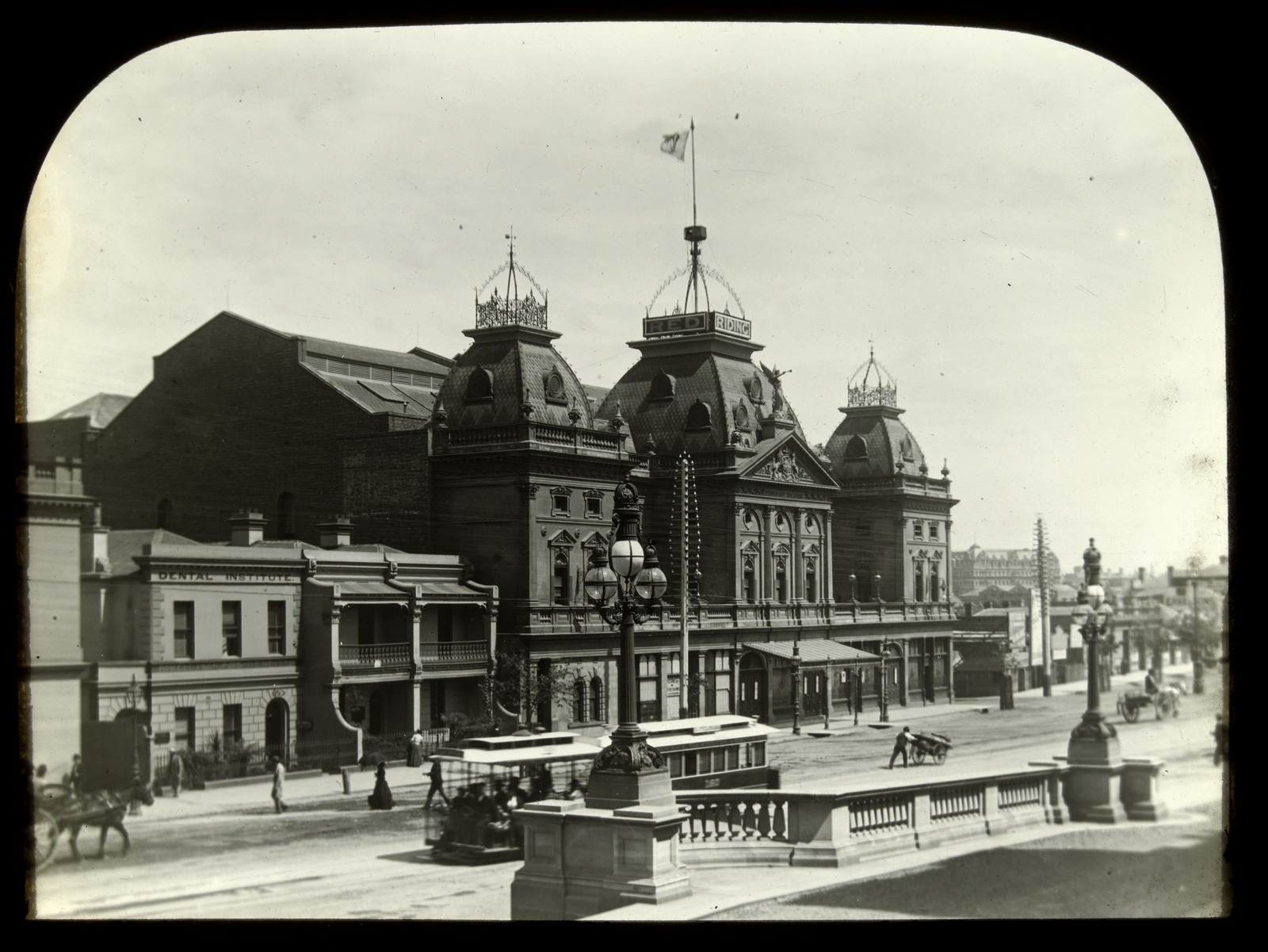
Princess Theatre Melbourne ca. 1894 State Library Victoria

By 1885, the theatre came under the control of "The Triumvirate", a partnership between J. C. Williamson, George Musgrove and Arthur Garner. The existing theatre had become rundown, and so the Triumvirate resolved to demolish the existing building.

The new theatre, designed by architect William Pitt, interiors designed by George Gordon, and built by Cockram and Comely, was completed in 1886 at a cost of £50,000. The design is in the exuberant Second Empire style, and the theatre forms part of the Victorian streetscape of Spring Street. The theatre re-opened, again, on 18 December 1886, this time simply known as the Princess Theatre, with a performance of Gilbert & Sullivan's The Mikado.

When completed, it featured state-of-the-art electrical stage lighting, as well as Australia's first sliding or retractable roof and ceiling which provided ventilation from the auditorium. The marble staircase and grand foyers were hailed as equal to that of the Paris Opera, the Frankfurt Stadt and the Grand in Bordeaux.

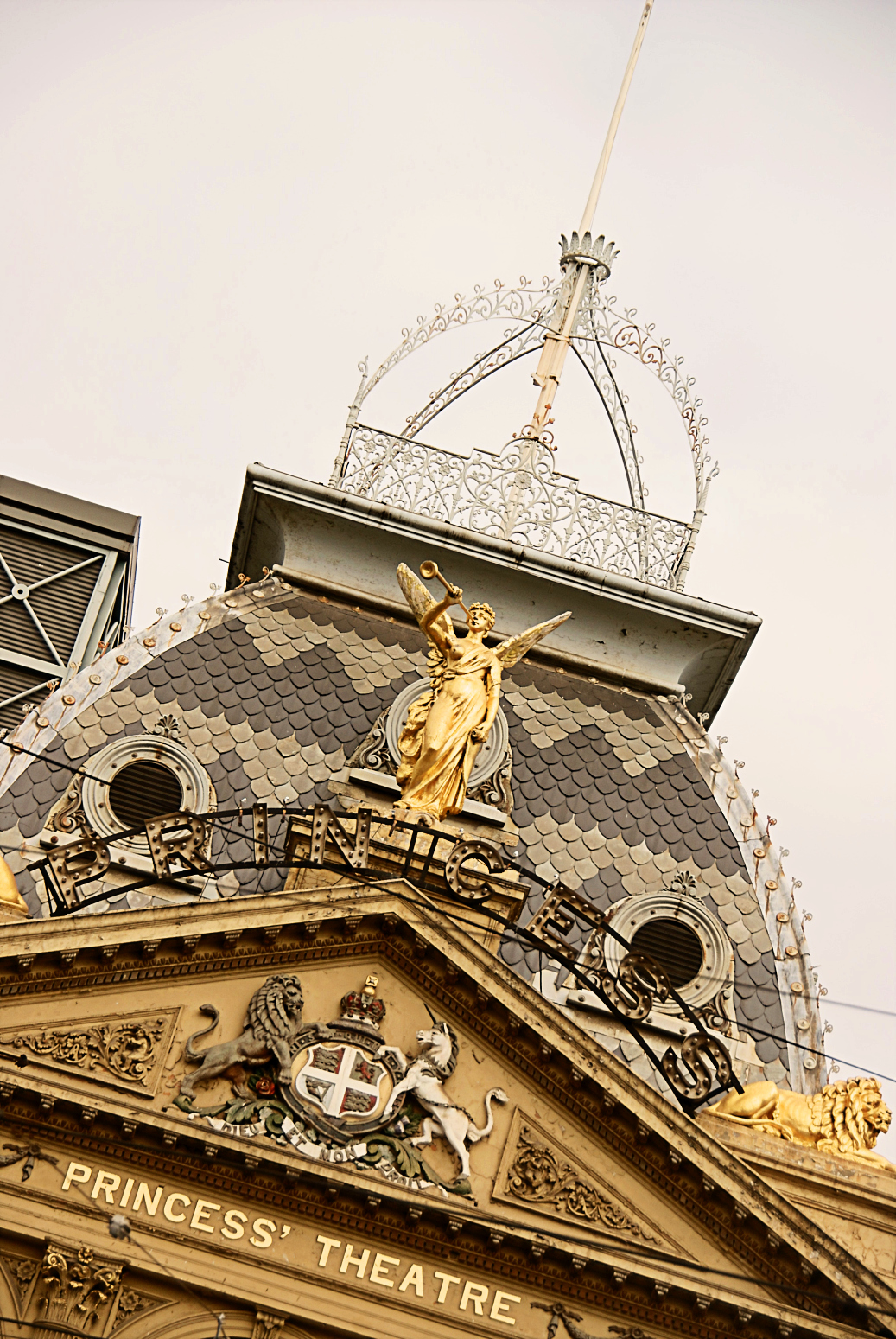
Detail of the roof

Williamson left the Triumvirate in 1899 to form his own company, and Musgrove continued operate the theatre until 1910. During his time in 1901 the open balconies were enclosed to form larger lounges known as 'wintergardens', which feature large Art Nouveau stained glass windows with depictions of various classical composers. This alteration was also designed by William Pitt. The Princess came under a rapid succession of different owners until 1915, when Ben Fuller took control. Fuller then went into partnership with Hugh Ward, and in 1922 they engaged the architect Henry Eli White to extensively renovate the building. A larger ground level foyer was created, and a new auditorium with fewer posts, in the Adam style, and the grand copper awning was added. The New Princess Theatre reopened on 26 December 1922 with a performance of The O'Brien Girl.

The theatre was purchased from Fuller in 1933 by Efftee Films, the film production company of Francis Thring, the theatrical and film entrepreneur, who had his initials FT carved over the proscenium arch. He produced several musicals there including the Australian musicals Collits' Inn and The Cedar Tree, and made it the first home of his radio station 3XY founded in 1935.

When Thring died, Sir Ben Fuller and Garnet Carroll took over the lease of the Princess and in 1946 they formed another partnership forming Carroll-Fuller Theatres Ltd to purchase the theatre.

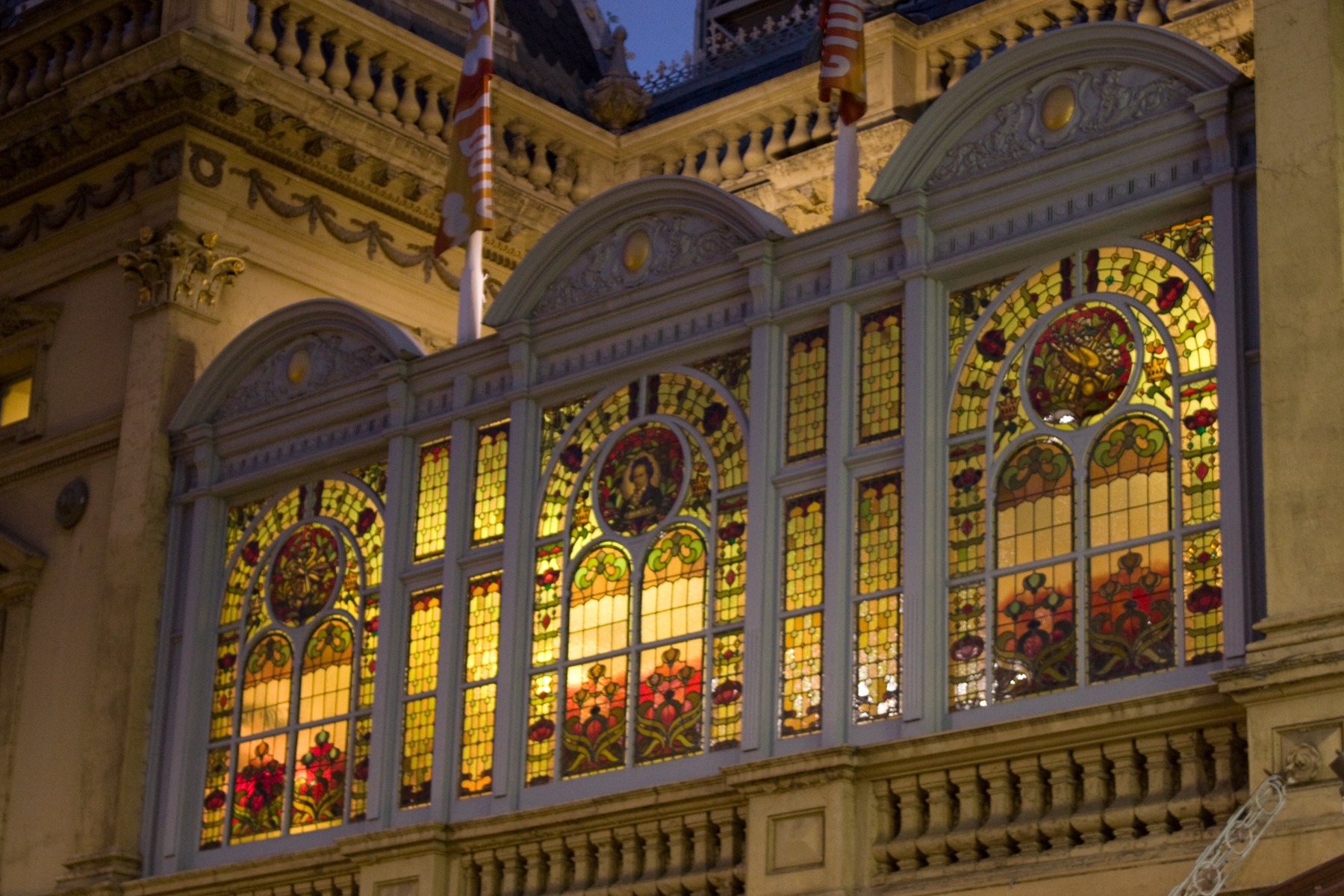
Stained glass window on the Princess Theatre exterior.

After Fuller's death in 1952, Carroll assumed complete control. For the following 12 years, often in association with other entrepreneurs, he presented an eclectic array of opera, ballet, musical comedy and drama, though he was constrained by the lack of an interstate circuit. At the Princess in 1954 he hosted the National Theatre Movement’s gala performance of The Tales of Hoffmann for Queen Elizabeth II and Prince Philip. Other notable productions included Ballet Rambert (1947–48), the Old Vic Theatre Company with Sir Laurence (Lord) Olivier and Vivien Leigh (1948), the Shakespeare Memorial Theatre Company (1949), the Vienna Boys' Choir (1954), the Chinese Classical Theatre (1956) and the Sadler's Wells Opera Company (1960 and 1962). Carroll often staged elaborate American musicals—among them Kismet (which he himself produced in 1954), The Sound of Music (1960), The King and I (1960) and Carousel (1964)—while they were still in their early months on Broadway, and tried unknown singers and actors.

Carroll died on 23 August 1964 and ownership passed to his son, John Carroll. For some years he maintained the pattern set by his father, but in 1969 the family company, Carroll Freeholds Pty Ltd, leased the Princess to the Australian Elizabethan Theatre Trust. Over time, the theatre was used less frequently, and the theatre fell into disrepair.

== 1989 reopening and current operation ==
In 1986, David Marriner purchased the theatre and commenced a renovation and refurbishment to restore the building to its 1922 state, and improve its technical capacity. The refurbished theatre reopened on 9 December 1989 with the musical Les Misérables, followed by The Phantom of the Opera, which established a new record for the longest running show ever staged in Victoria.

The Princess Theatre continues to be owned and operated by the Marriner Group as a venue for major musical theatre productions, including Beauty and the Beast, Mamma Mia!, Jersey Boys and The Book of Mormon.

The Australian production of Harry Potter and the Cursed Child opened at the Princess Theatre in early 2019, as the third location for the production after London and New York. The theatre underwent a comprehensive internal and external refurbishment in 2018 in preparation for the production. In its first year, the production was the most successful in the history of Australian theatre, with over 326,000 attendees. However, it was then forced to take a forty-nine week hiatus due to the COVID-19 pandemic. When the production reopened in February 2021, it was the first location to recommence worldwide.

Harry Potter and the Cursed Child closed on Sunday 9 July 2023, bringing to an end the longest-running play in Australian history. The auditorium was then extensive restored back to the 1922 colour scheme.

== Ghost sightings ==
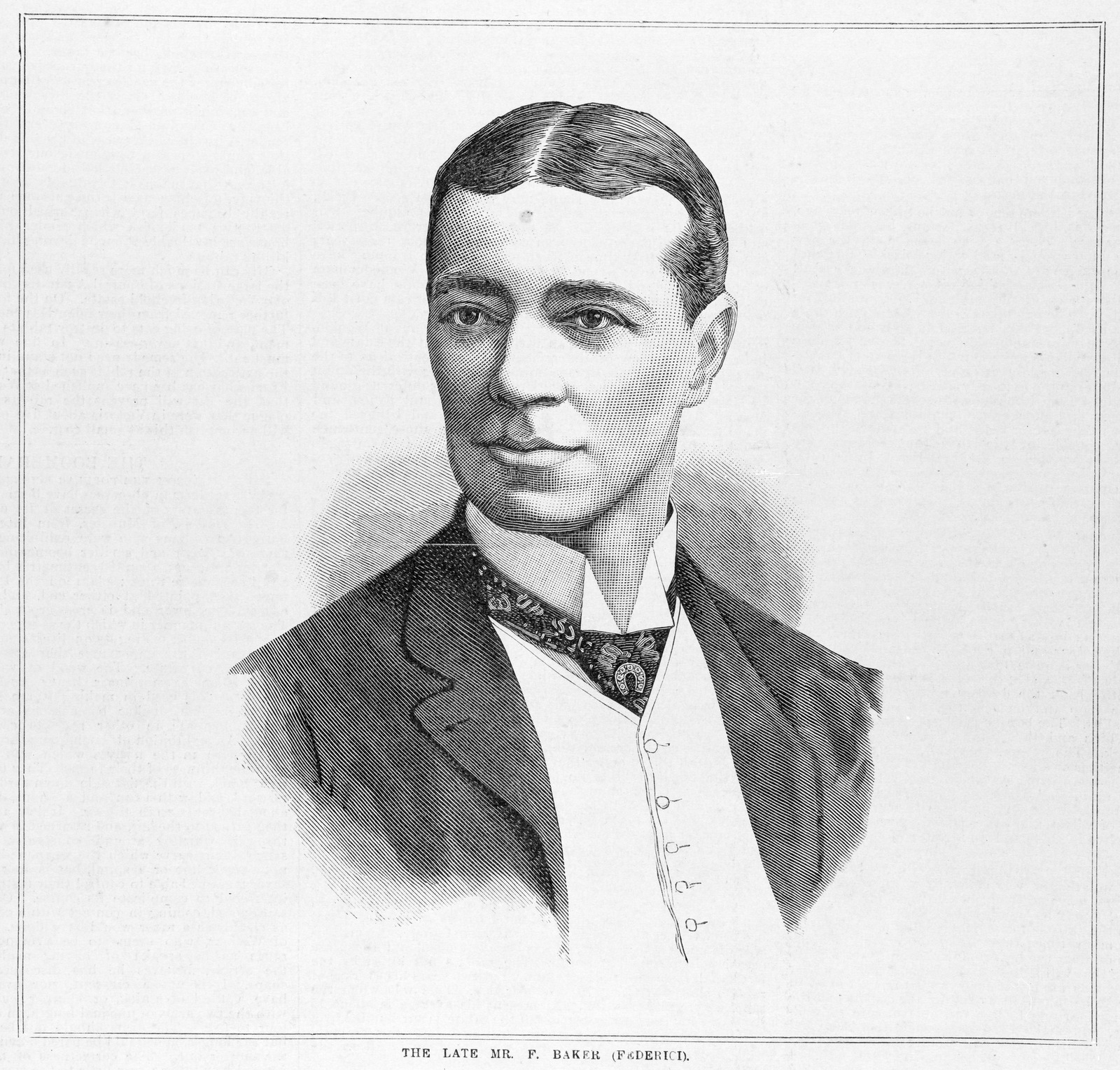
Frederick Federici, c. 1888

The theatre has experienced several reported ghost sightings.

On the evening of 3 March 1888, the baritone Frederick Baker, known under the stage name "Frederick Federici", was performing the role of Mephistopheles in Gounod's opera Faust. This production ended with Mephistopheles sinking dramatically through a trapdoor returning to the fires of hell with his prize, the unfortunate Dr Faustus. As Federici was lowered down through the stage into this basement, he had a heart attack and died almost immediately. He never came back onstage to take his bows, but when the company was told of what had happened at the end of the opera, they said that he had been onstage and taken the bows with them. Since then, various people have claimed to see a ghostly figure in evening dress at the theatre. For many years, a third-row seat in the dress circle was kept vacant in his honour.

== Previous productions ==
Notable productions at the Princess Theatre include:

- 1933: Collits' Inn
- 1934: The Cedar Tree
- 1951: An Aboriginal Moomba: Out of the Dark
- 1956: Kismet
- 1957: Salad Days
- 1958: Bells are Ringing, Free as Air
- 1959: Once Upon a Mattress
- 1960: The Music Man, West Side Story
- 1961: Lock Up Your Daughters, The Most Happy Fella, The Sound of Music
- 1962: The King and I
- 1963: Wildcat
- 1964: Carousel, Finian's Rainbow
- 1965: High Spirits, Porgy and Bess
- 1966: Robert and Elizabeth
- 1968: Marlene Dietrich
- 1972: Carol Channing
- 1975: The Magic Show
- 1976: Betty Blokk Buster Follies
- 1979: Danny La Rue
- 1983: West Side Story
- 1984: Fiddler on the Roof
- 1986: The Rocky Horror Show
- 1988: Manning Clark's History of Australia - The Musical
- 1989: Les Misérables
- 1990: The Phantom of the Opera
- 1993: Cats, Scrooge
- 1994: West Side Story, Me and My Girl, Hot Shoe Shuffle
- 1995: Beauty and the Beast
- 1997: Chess, A Little Night Music, The Phantom of the Opera
- 1998: Les Misérables
- 1999: The Boy from Oz
- 2000: The Importance of Being Earnest, The Sound of Music
- 2001: Mamma Mia!
- 2002: The Witches of Eastwick
- 2004: The Producers
- 2005: Dirty Dancing
- 2006: Swan Lake on Ice, Kiss Me, Kate
- 2007: The Phantom of the Opera
- 2008: Guys and Dolls
- 2009: Jersey Boys
- 2010: Hairspray
- 2012: Moonshadow, South Pacific
- 2013: Legally Blonde
- 2014: The King & I, Once
- 2015: Anything Goes, Fiddler on the Roof
- 2016: Matilda the Musical
- 2017: The Book of Mormon
- 2018: Mamma Mia!
- 2019: Harry Potter and the Cursed Child
- 2023: Mamma Mia!
- 2024: Groundhog Day, Sunset Boulevard, Frankenstein, Tina: The Tina Turner Musical
- 2025: Jesus Christ Superstar, Annie, The Nutcracker
- 2026: The Book of Mormon, A Beautiful Noise

It has also been used as a venue for the Melbourne International Comedy Festival, including the stage show Puppet Up! in 2007.
