= Lilian Elkington =

English composer, pianist and organist

Iris Lilian Mary Elkington (15 September 1900 – 13 August 1969) was an English pianist and composer.

== Education ==
Lilian Elkington was born in Aston, Birmingham, the daughter of W. H. Elkington. She showed early promise as a pianist, making her first public performance at the age of six. She studied piano, organ and composition (with Sir Granville Bantock) at the Birmingham and Midland School of Music and began her musical career as a pianist, performing piano concertos and solo pieces at Birmingham Town Hall and in Bournemouth and Harrogate.

== Composer ==
Her compositions were all written in the early and mid-1920s. The short orchestral tone poem Out of the Mist, commemorating the last journey of the coffin bearing the body of The Unknown Warrior across the English Channel in November 1920, was first performed in June 1921 by the Birmingham and Midland Orchestra, conducted by Granville Bantock. Howard Carr conducted a second performance 15 months later, on 21 December 1922 in Harrogate. During the 1920s it was played fairly often around the Midlands area.

== Marriage ==
By 1924 she had formed a duo with the violist and violinist Arthur Kennedy, whom she met while studying in Birmingham. A pupil of Rowsby Woof at the Royal Academy of Music, Kennedy later played with various BBC orchestras. After her marriage to Kennedy in August 1926 she gradually withdrew from both composing and performing, except as a local church musician. She made occasional appearances in BBC radio broadcasts of recitals from Birmingham between 1925 and 1929, including a performance of works by Liszt, Chabrier, Chopin and Dohnanyi in April 1926. She was organist at the Sacred Heart Church in Aston (where she was also married), at Abbey Church in Erdington, and was organist and choir director in Sutton Coldfield.

In 1948 the couple moved from 32 Frederick Road, Gravelly Hill in Birmingham to Ridge House, Groveside Great Bookham in Surrey, and then in 1954 they moved again to East Horsley. There was a son and a daughter, Mary Williams.

== Rediscovery ==
Lilian Elkington's work as a composer was soon forgotten and (aside from the basic Who's Who in Music entries up until 1950) she doesn't appear in any contemporary reference books or music publications. Following her death in 1969, while on holiday in Austria, her husband is said to have disposed of her scores. The only surviving manuscripts are those that were rediscovered in the 1970s by the musicologist David J Brown at a bookshop in Worthing. The manuscripts he found included the full score and orchestral parts of Out of the Mist, two pieces for violin and piano (Rhapsody, op.1 and Romance, op. 3), and a song Little Hands (words S J J Wise).

The first modern performance of Out of the Mist was given at Eton School Hall by the Windsor Sinfonia, conducted by Robert Tucker, on 24 September 1988. It was first recorded in 2006 by the BBC Symphony Orchestra, conducted by David Lloyd Jones.
