= Gladys Moncrieff =

Australian singer (1892–1976)

Gladys Moncrieff OBE
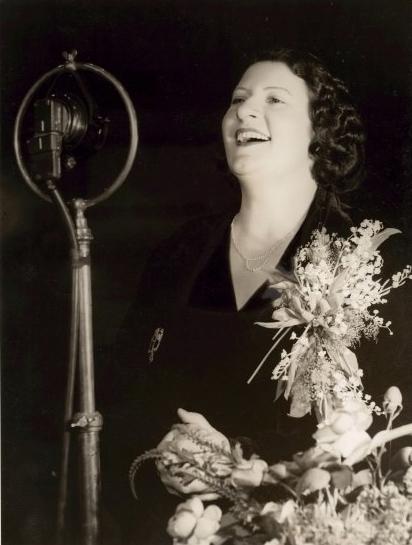
- Gladys Moncrieff performing in the 1930s

Background information
- Born: 13 April 1892; Bundaberg, Queensland, Australia
- Died: 8 February 1976 (aged 83) Gold Coast, Queensland, Australia
- Genres: Musical theatre, opera
- Occupation: Singer

Gladys Lillian Moncrieff OBE (13 April 1892 – 8 February 1976) was an Australian singer who was so successful in musical theatre and recordings that she became known as 'Australia's Queen of Song' and 'Our Glad'.

== Early life ==
Moncrieff was born in Bundaberg, Queensland. Her father Robert Edward Moncrieff was a piano tuner, and her mother, who went by the stage name Amy Lambell, was a professional singer; they lived in North Isis. She attended several schools in north Queensland, and quickly became involved in music. Her first stage performance was at the age of six at the Queen's Theatre in Bundaberg, where she sang the American folk song "The Merriest Girl That's Out" with her father accompanying on piano. She performed in Gilbert and Sullivan productions. At the 1907 Charters Towers eisteddfod, Gladys shared first prize for her junior soprano rendition of "O for the Wings of a Dove" with local girl Eileen Coleman.

== Career ==
When Moncrieff left school, she and her parents travelled around far north Queensland performing. Moncrieff was billed as 'Little Gladys: The Australian Wonder Child' and her performances helped her to raise funds to move to Brisbane to pursue her career. She worked in Brisbane and Toowoomba during 1909, and then went to Sydney with her mother. In Sydney she auditioned for Hugh J. Ward for a position in J. C. Williamson's theatre. She was successful, and with a starting salary of £3 per week she spent 18 months receiving singing lessons from Ward's wife, Madame Grace Miller. In January 1913 she had a small part in The Sunshine Girl at Her Majesty's Theatre, Sydney. In 1914 she was in the chorus of a house Gilbert and Sullivan production; for there she took on leading roles such as Josephine in H.M.S. Pinafore. The company toured New Zealand and performed in Melbourne.

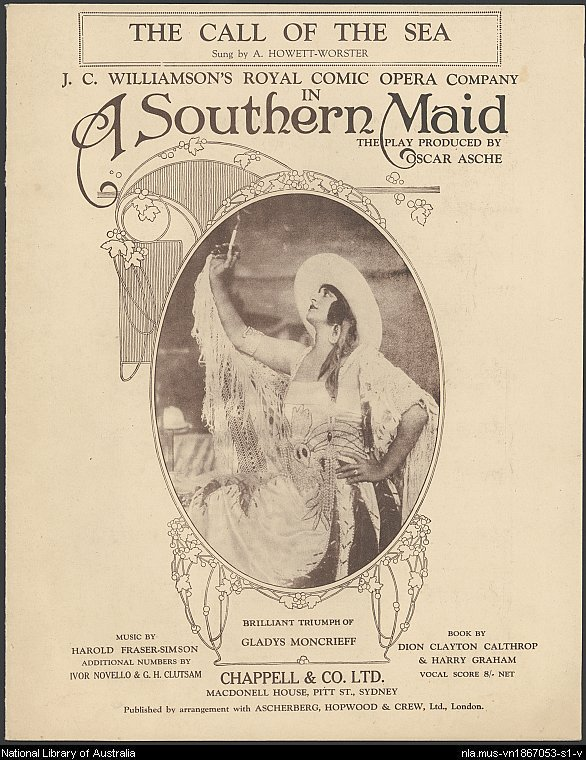
Sheet music from A Southern Maid

Moncrieff toured South Africa and New Zealand as a leading lady in numerous productions. When she returned to Australia she landed her most famous role as Teresa in Harold Fraser-Simson's light opera The Maid of the Mountains, which she first performed in Melbourne in 1921. The waltz song "Love Will Find a Way" became particularly associated with her. The Maid was to become the most frequently revived musical of the Australian stage, and Moncrieff appeared in it some 2,800 times. She also was a success in A Southern Maid in 1923.

Contemporary critics wrote of the purity, richness, power and wide range of her voice, her conviction of style and her clear enunciation. H. Brewster-Jones spoke of the "richness of quality and expression in her well produced voice, and makes a striking appeal to a concert audience with her platform manner and interpretive abilities" in a 1938 review of a concert performance at the Adelaide Town Hall.

Her career was put on hold in March 1938 when she was involved in a motor vehicle accident, and she did not return to the stage until June 1940. She returned to perform in musical comedy, and was engaged to entertain Australian troops fighting in the Second World War at home and in New Guinea, and she became very active raising funds for war-related charities. In 1951 she toured Japan and Korea to entertain British and Australian occupation forces. For her wartime contributions, she was made an Officer of the Order of the British Empire in 1952 for services to patriotic and charitable movements.

She continued her stage and radio work, and during 1958 and 1959 began her farewell stage tour of Australia and New Zealand. Her final stage appearance was at Hamilton, New Zealand, and her last public performance was in a televised concert in Brisbane in 1962. She retired to the Gold Coast, Queensland in 1968 and prepared her memoirs My Life of Song which was ghosted by Lillian Palmer and published in 1971. In 1962 Moncrieff made guest appearances on George Wallace Jnr’s television show Theatre Royal.

Moncrieff came outside of her Gold Coast home on a canal to wave to the people on the canal cruise boats whilst they played her arias.

== Legacy ==
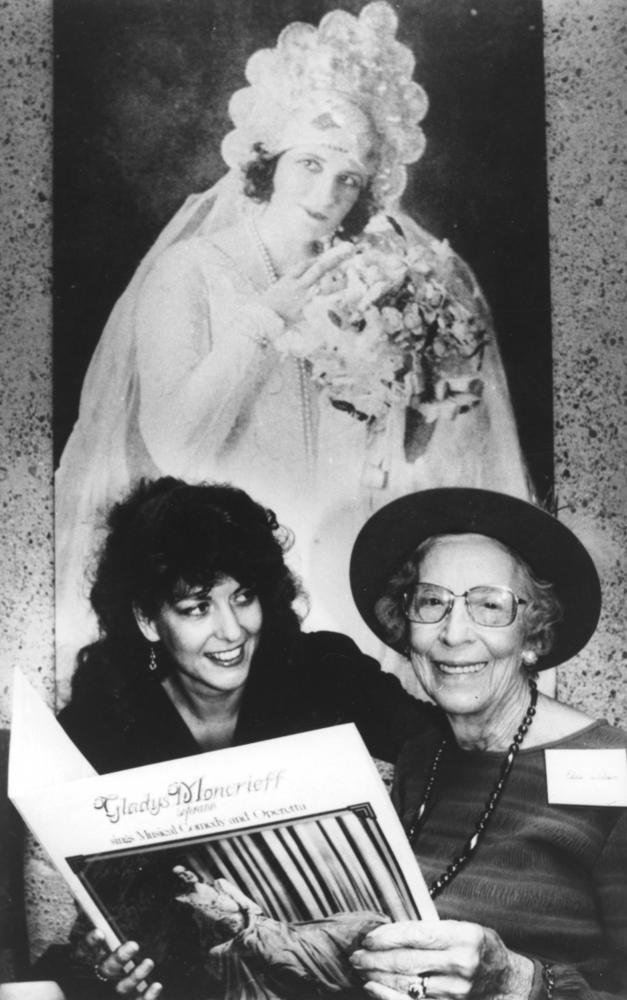
Moncrieff's friend Elsie Wilson with Jeanette Burrows of the Queensland Performing Arts Trust

The federal electoral division of Moncrieff in Queensland, and the Canberra suburb Moncrieff are both named in her honour. Her image was featured on an Australian postage stamp in 1989. The main entertainment complex in Bundaberg was named the Moncrieff Theatre, later changed to the Moncrieff Entertainment Centre. A Gold Coast park was named in her honour, and the Queensland Performing Arts Centre maintains the Gladys Moncrieff Library of the Performing Arts.

A book Gladys Moncrieff : Australia's Queen of Song by Adrian Magee was published in 1996. A 2-CD release of her recordings was put out in 2012 entitled Gladys Moncrieff – Our Glad: The Queen of Song, based on her 1920s and 1930s recordings; four earlier CDs contain all of the songs on this 2-CD release plus others, and were released in the 1990s: Gladys Moncrieff Sings Musical Comedy & Operetta, Gladys Moncrieff: the Golden Years, Gladys Moncrieff: Australia's Queen of Song, Gladys Moncrieff: Favourite Popular Ballads; a few additional songs are found on the double cassette: Gladys Moncrieff: Stage Musicals.

Her personal papers, including correspondence, photographs, newspaper clippings and theatre programs are held at the State Library of Queensland.

In 2009 as part of the Q150 celebrations, Gladys Moncrieff was announced as one of the Q150 Icons of Queensland for her role as an "Influential Artists".

== Personal life ==
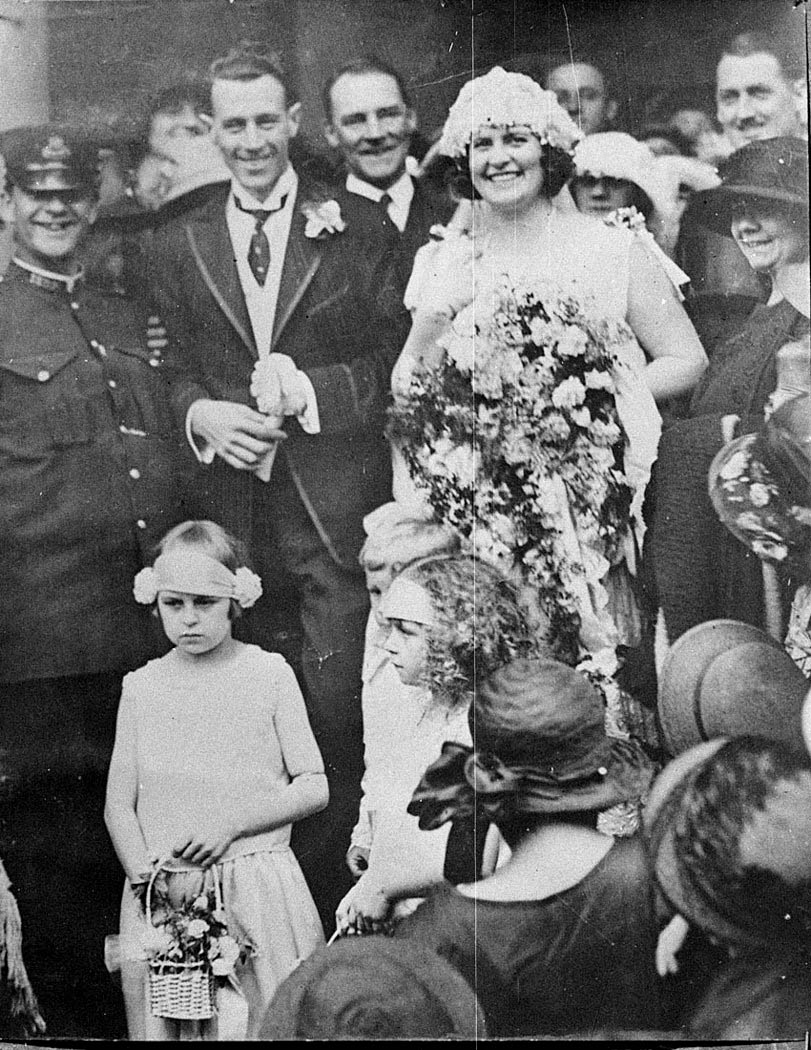
Moncrieff's wedding at St James' Church (Sam Hood)

In May 1924, Moncrieff married Thomas Henry Moore, at St James' Church, Sydney in a ceremony that attracted a large crowd. Moore became her manager. While honeymooning in England and France, she made her first gramophone recordings for the Vocalion Company. In Australia she was hugely successful as a musical comedy performer. She earned £150 a week, which made her one of the highest-paid performers in the history of Australian theatre. She left Australia for the stage in England in 1926. Her first show there was poorly received, but when she appeared in Franz Lehár's The Blue Mazurka in 1927, her success in England was assured. While in England she made 37 more gramophone recordings, which were sold locally and exported to Australia where they sold successfully.

Her marriage was not successful and she began to live apart from her husband, and then returned to Australia to appear in John Fuller's Rio Rita. The production was a commercial success and her career in Australia bloomed. She had a radio show in Australia and in the 1930s undertook tours for the New Zealand Broadcasting Service with New Zealand pianist Gil Dech. She also appeared in the Australian musicals Collits' Inn and The Cedar Tree for producer F. W. Thring.

=== Death ===
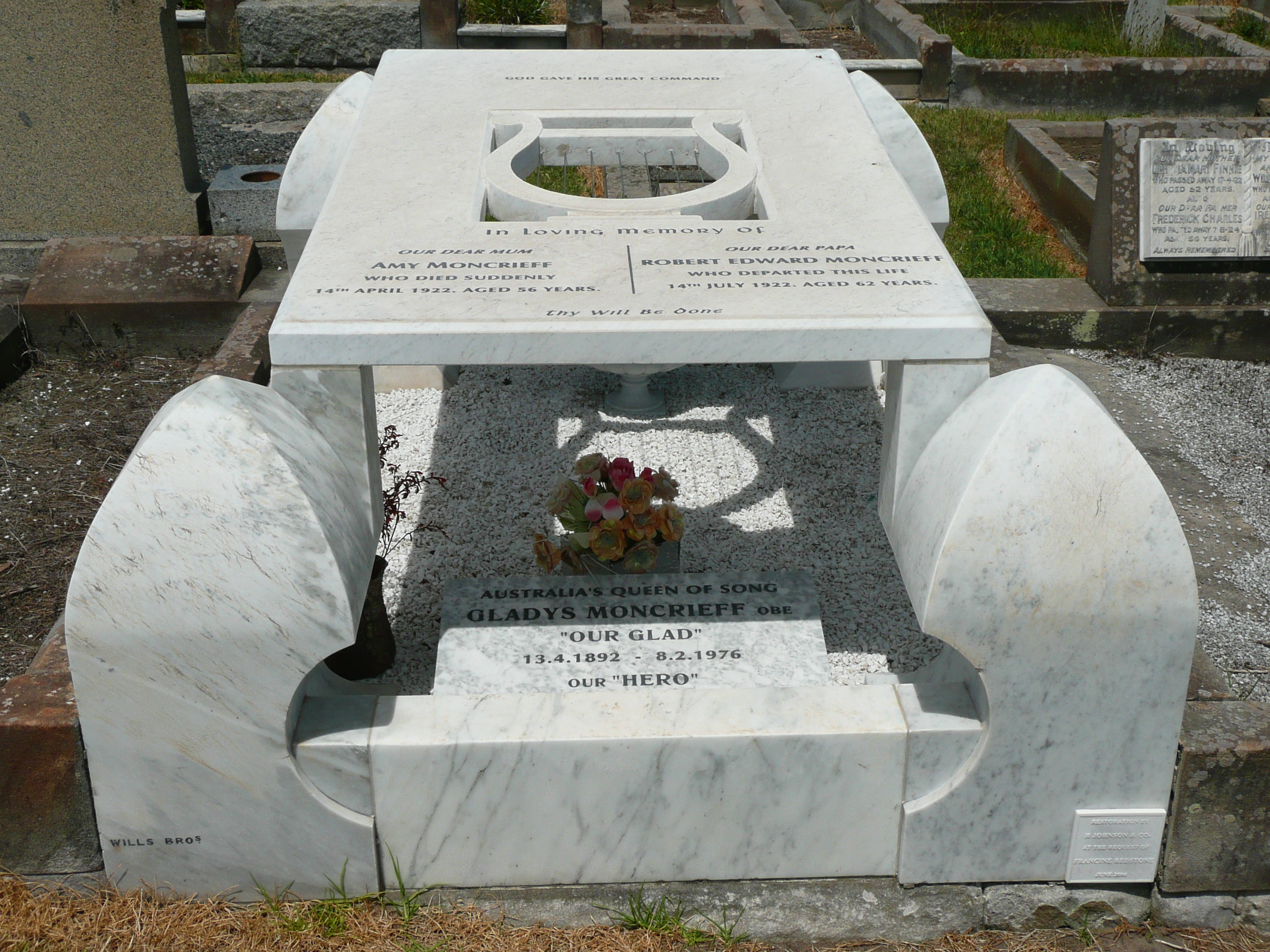
Moncrieff's grave at South Head Cemetery, Vaucluse, New South Wales

Moncrieff died at Pindara Private Hospital at the Gold Coast at the age of 83. In 1984, a new Gold Coast federal electoral division was created and was named the Division of Moncrieff in honour of the singer.

== Select album discography ==
- 1996 – Australia's Queen Of Song (EMI Records Australia)
