= Gil Dech =

New Zealand musician (1897–1974)

- Born: Gilbert Thomas Pinfield; 3 February 1897; Yardley, Worcestershire, England
- Died: 1 November 1974 (aged 77) Wellington, New Zealand
- Genres: Light music; Classical music
- Occupations: Pianist; Conductor
- Labels: Columbia Records, Regal Recordings, Regal Zonophone

Gilbert Thomas Dech (3 February 1897 – 1 November 1974) was a New Zealand pianist, recording director and conductor. He was born in Yardley and died in Wellington.

== Discography ==
=== Studio albums ===
- Remembrance (1956, Columbia)
- The Robin's Return (1956, Columbia)
- Plays Music From Stage And Screen (1956, Columbia)
- Plays Music Of Jerome Kern (1956, Columbia)
- Plays Favourite Ballads (1957, Columbia)
- Gil Dech Plays Piano Miniatures (1968, His Master's Voice)
