= Varney Monk =

Australian pianist and composer (1892–1967)

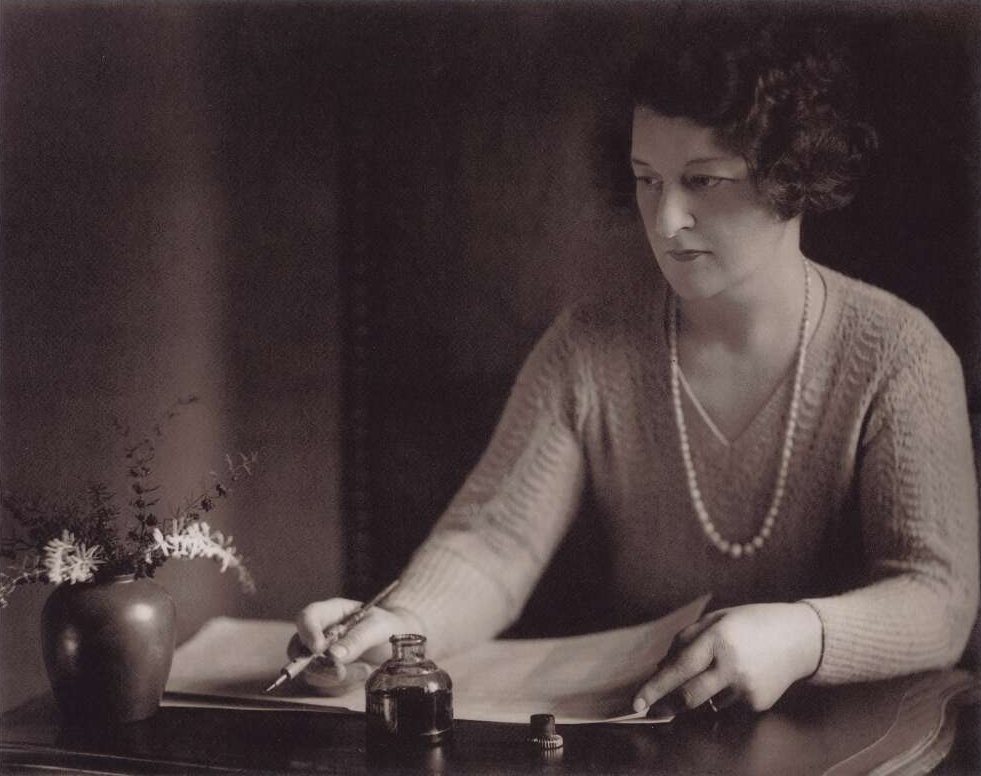
Monk in 1933

Varney Monk (born Isabel Varney Desmond Peterson; 18 January 1892 – 7 February 1967) was an Australian pianist and composer, best known for writing the musicals Collits' Inn (1932) and The Cedar Tree (1934). Collits' Inn was described by the Sydney Morning Herald as "an Australian opera".

From families of Scottish heritage and musical ability, her father was a solicitor. Soon after her birth in Bacchus Marsh, the family moved to Tasmania. Monk's mother died when Monk was aged 11, and her father died in 1929.

During her career, she wrote more than 150 songs. Her first song was published when she was 13 years old, and by 1934, Monk had won the best song in an Australian Radio Competition with "Some distant day", and the 1933 Broken Hill Jubilee Song Competition. Using Australian poems as inspiration, she set to music three pieces of verse by Adam Lindsay Gordon (1833–1870), eight by Henry Kendall (1839–1882), two by Will H. Ogilvie (1869–1963), and others by Miles Franklin (1879–1954) and Henry Lawson (1867–1922).

She was the wife of Australian violinist Cyril Monk, whom she married in 1913. She had one son and one daughter, and lived in Mosman, Sydney, in later life.
