= A Ticket in Tatts (1934 film) =

- Directed by: F. W. Thring
- Written by: George Wallace; John P. McLeod
- Based on: High Heels musical revue by George Wallace
- Produced by: F. W. Thring
- Starring: George Wallace
- Cinematography: Arthur Higgins
- Edited by: W. Albrecht
- Production company: Efftee Film Productions
- Distributed by: Universal Pictures
- Release date: 13 January 1934
- Running time: 88 mins
- Country: Australia
- Language: English
- Budget: £11-12,000
- Box office: £18,000

A Ticket in Tatts is a 1934 musical comedy film starring popular stage comedian George Wallace as an accident-prone stablehand. It was the last of three films Wallace made for F. W. Thring.

== Plot ==
After being fired from his job at a grocer, George, gets a job as a stableboy at a local stud farm run by the Fleming family. He befriends the horse Hotspur who is a favourite to win the Melbourne Cup and develops a strong whistle that is used to make the horse run fast. Gangsters working for the villainous Coyle are determined to kidnap Hotspur but George figures it out and one is captured. To find out more information, George becomes a waiter at a cabaret where several ballet and vaudeville numbers are performed.

Dorothy Fleming is in love with author Harvey Walls, but is pursued by Brian Winters, the owner of rival horse Surefoot. Dorothy promises to marry Winters if Surefoot defeats Hotspur.

Coyle arranges for Peters, the Fleming's jockey, to be kidnapped and replaced with his jockey, Slade, with the aim of making sure Hotspur loses. Slade rides the horse and keeps Hotspur back in the field. However George uses his whistle to help the horse win. Dorothy and Harvey are united, as are George and Dorothy's maid.

== Cast ==
- George Wallace as George
- Frank Harvey as Brian Winters
- Campbell Copelin as Harvey Walls
- Thelma Scott as Dorothy Fleming
- Harold Meade as Mr Fleming
- Marshall Crosby as Mr Summers
- Nick Morton as Nick
- Guy Hastings as Mr Coyle
- Norman Shepherd as a crook
- Stan Ray as a stablehand
- John Dobbie as a stablehand
- Darcy Kelway as a farmer
- Dan Thomas as a crook
- Noel Boyd as Harvey's secretary
- Joyce Turner as Marjorie
- Marie La Varre as Mrs Doyle
- Dora Mostyn as Mrs Carter
- Alec Walker as Peters
- Frank Crowther as Slade
- Royce Milton as head waiter
- the Efftee Ballet

== Production ==
This was the third film Wallace had made for F.W. Thring, the others being the musical's His Royal Highness and Harmony Row. It was originally announced the film would be written by C.J. Dennis, whose The Sentimental Bloke had been filmed by Thring. However the final script credit goes to George Wallace and John P. McLeod.

Wallace said the story was based on a play of his, High Heels, which was inspired by the attack on Phar Lap prior to the Melbourne Cup; he rewrote it as a novel. (Wallace had performed in High Heels, a music revue in 1930.) The script said the film was based on High Heels by Wallace and High Stakes by McLoud.

The film was originally called High Heels.

The film marked the first appearance in an Australian feature by the actor and writer Frank Harvey.

Shooting began in July 1933. Unlike many of Thring's films, much of the movie was shot on location, at a stuff dark near Melbourne, at Flemington Racecourse and the grounds of a Melbourne villa. Studio scenes were still shot at Efftee's studio at His Majesty's Theatre but it was the last time Thring used it – after the film he moved operations to the former Wattle Path Dance Palais at St Kilda which Efftee had bought for £23,000.

Filming stopped briefly in October so Wallace could appear in a revue and Thring could work on Sheepmates (which was abandoned).

== Release ==
The film was also known as High Stakes and released with the short Dear Old London.

The film was released in New Zealand and England.

=== Box office ===
It proved reasonably popular at the box office, running for six weeks at a Melbourne cinema. Thring complained about difficulties of securing a decent release in Sydney. The film ran for six weeks in Sydney.

== Critical reception ==
The Melbourne Herald wrote "it is a pity... if we are to be judged abroad by this picture. In spite of some really finished acting, the humor- is too much of the slapstick variety, and the action degenerates at times into mere buffoonery."

The Bulletin said as long as Wallace "monopolises the canvas it is undeniably funny. But there is also a story about how Thelma Scott wagers with Frank Harvey that if Hotspur wins the Cup she will marry him and if it doesn’t she won’t, or the other way about This part of the yarn is so sketchily dealt with that it becomes boresome."

Filmink called the film "creaky, with a particularly dumb plot where Scott can’t break up with Frank Harvey “because a bet’s a bet”... But it has a strong cast, decent central conflict (gangsters wanting to take out the horse), and impressive location photography, not to mention numerous incidental pleasures such as the way Thelma Scott’s character clearly lusts after Campbell Copelin’s – quite progressive in its way, to see this female desire."

== Legacy ==
Wallace remained under contract for Efftee and appeared for them on stage in Collits' Inn. Plans were also announced to star him in the films Ginger Murdoch and The Black Sheep. However Thring died in 1936 before these could be made.

Wallace then made two films for Cinesound which followed the story telling formula of A Ticket in Tatts: "George is given a simple labourer's job... Quite innocently is fired... He then becomes involved in a simple wish-fulfilment device... the device is complicated by an equally simple set of stereotyped gangsters who have no motivation beyond innate greed for greater wealth, and in each situation they are foiled, usually accidentally, by George and his friends."

== Note ==
- Fitzpatrick, Peter, The Two Frank Thrings, Monash University, 2012
