= The George Wallace Show =

Australian variety television program

- Genre: Variety
- Presented by: George Wallace Jnr
- Country of origin: Australia
- Original language: English
- No. of seasons: 1

Original release
- Network: TCN-9
- Release: 1960 – 1960

The George Wallace Show was an Australian television series which aired in 1960. Starring George Wallace Jnr, it was a variety series aired in a daytime time-slot on Sydney station TCN-9. At 2:00PM, it aired against Your Home on ATN-7, while ABN-2 did not offer any programming until 2:30PM.

Little information is available on this series. George Wallace Jr, who was the son of very popular Australian comedian George Wallace, later became a regular on the Brisbane-produced series Theatre Royal, and was a popular comedian in his own right.

== See also ==
- List of Australian television series
- The Contact Show
- Theatre Royal
