= Devil's Playground =

Devil's Playground may refer to:

== Films ==
- The Devil's Playground (1928 film), an Australian silent drama
- Devil's Playground (1937 film), an American drama
- The Devil's Playground (1946 film), a drama starring William Boyd as Hop-Along Cassidy
- The Devil's Playground (1976 film), an Australian semi-autobiography by Fred Schepisi
- Devil's Playground (2002 film), a documentary about the Amish period called Rumspringa
- Devil's Playground (2010 film), a British horror film

== Music ==
- Devil's Playground (album), a 2005 album by Billy Idol
- Da Devil's Playground: Underground Solo, a 1999 album by Koopsta Knicca
- "Devil's Plaything", a song from the 1990 album Danzig II: Lucifuge by Danzig
- "Devil's Playground", a song on the 2002 album Unfold the Future by The Flower Kings

== Other uses ==
- Devil's Playground (TV series), a 2014 TV series, a sequel to the 1976 Australian film
- The Devil's Playground, a 2004 novel by Stav Sherez
- Devils Playground, an area within the Mojave Desert
- A flat, nearly straight section of the Pikes Peak Highway, above treeline, that is a lightning hotspot
