= Beanpole =

Beanpole may refer to:

- Beanpole (film), a 2019 film directed by Kantemir Balagov
- Bean Pole International, a South Korean fashion brand
- Trellis, an upright structure to support plants
- Beanpole, a character played by Australian TV personality Dick McCann
- Jean-Paul Deliet, nicknamed Beanpole, a fictional character in the Tripods novels by John Christopher

== See also ==
- Pole bean
