= Thelma Scott =

Australian actress (1913–2006)

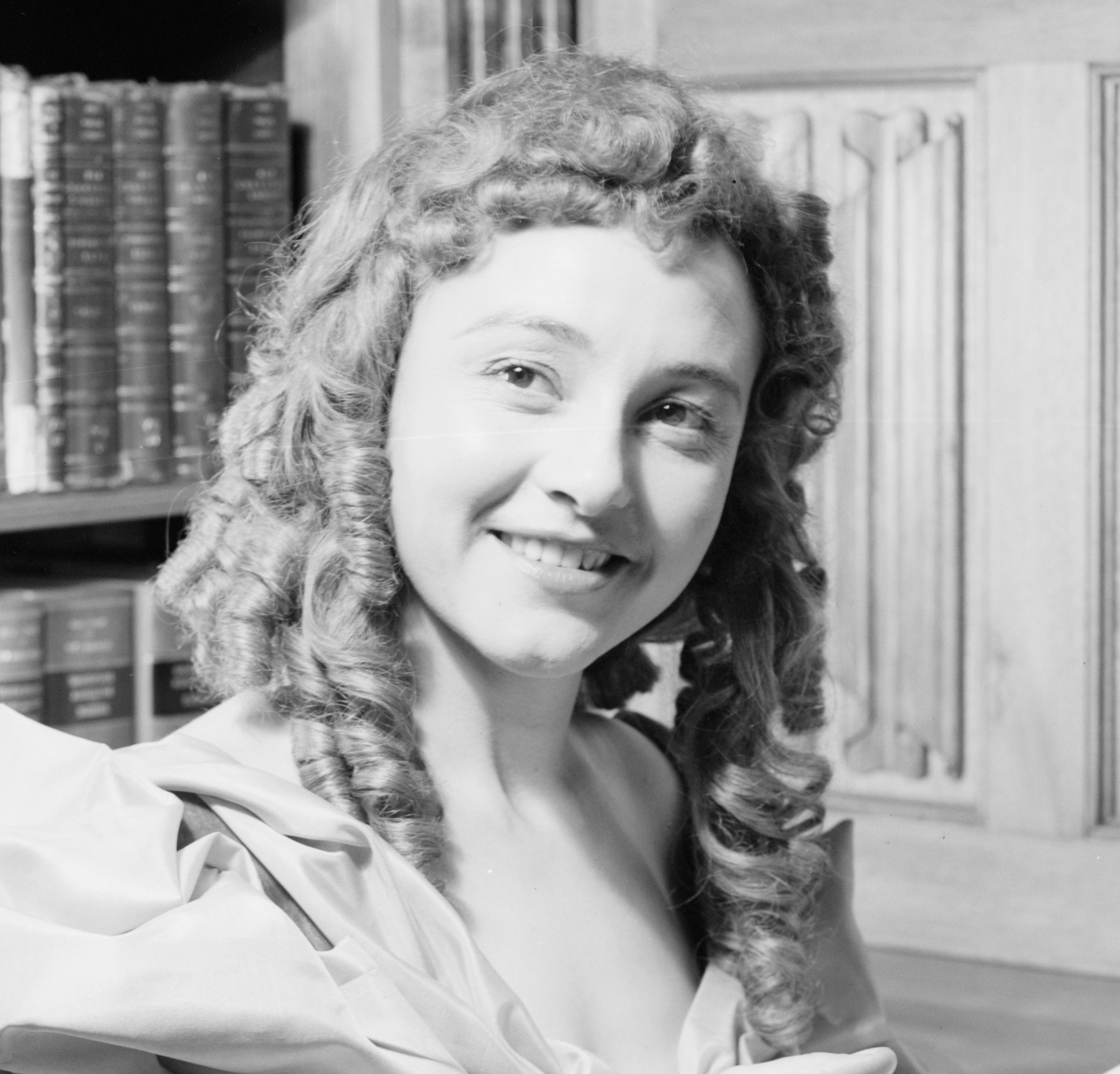
- Thelma Scott, at the State Library of New South Wales in 1947
- Born: Thelma Marjorie Scott; 17 June 1913; Melbourne, Victoria, Australia
- Died: 23 November 2006 (aged 93); St Leonards, New South Wales, Australia
- Other name: Thelly
- Occupation: Actress
- Years active: 1931–1988
- Known for: Number 96
- Partner: Gwen Plumb

Thelma Marjorie Scott (17 June 1913 (Note: Thelma Scott's original birth year in older records was given as 1910.) – 23 November 2006) was an Australian character actress whose six-decade career in theatre, radio, film and Australian made her one of her country's most recognisable and beloved personalities.

Having started her career in the early 1930s in theatre and surporting parts in film productions, she became one of the nation's biggest radio stars during The Golden Age of Radio alongside her contemporaries Queenie Ashton, Ethel Lang, Peg Christensen Edward Howell and her partner Gwen Plumb, featuring during the 1940s in productions such including serials such as Big Sister and Blue Hills. and radio plays like The Constant Nymph

She returned to make TV films in the early late 1950s and then became a star on television after it was launched in Australia. She became best known for roles in soap operas including Number 96 as Claire Houghton (the socialite mother of Abigails Bev Houghton) and Mrs. Jennings in Richmond Hill.

== Theatre and film ==
Thelma Scott began her career in the theatre in 1931 at the age of 18, having joined the firm of theatrical impresario Gregan McMahon's company the "Gregan McMahon Players". Her first professional acting role was as Ilona Szabo in McMahon's 1931 production of The Play's the Thing at Melbourne's Comedy Theatre. She followed this with roles in productions of Six Characters in Search of an Author, Too Good to Be True and Wind in the Rain. In 1932 she appeared with Coral Browne in the comedy Take Two from One. In 1933 they again acted together, this time in Children in Uniform for Efftee Players.

Scott appeared in many early Australia motion pictures starting in the early 1930s, until 1949, although in non-starring roles, with the exception of Sons of Matthew. She debuted in her first film in 1931, The Haunted Barn, a short produced by Efftee Studios and directed by Gregan McMahon. Following this came roles in feature films Diggers in Blighty and Harmony Row starring popular comedian George Wallace. The films premiered as a double bill in Melbourne in February 1933. Almost a year later, she and Wallace appeared together in the film A Ticket in Tatts.

== Radio ==
During this period Scott also acted in radio plays, and she continued her theatre work. She was critically acclaimed in her 1934 performance as Tessa in the play The Constant Nymph. Based on this, she was offered a six-year contract with James Cassius Williamson's theatre company, with the intention of grooming her for musical comedy. Scott chose to move in the direction of drama, opting for a role in the thriller Ten Minute Alibi, which had a successful run, touring Sydney and Melbourne. She subsequently signed with radio 2CH, emerging as one of Australia's biggest radio stars. She attracted both popular and critical praise for her work in the medium, and acted in countless radio productions throughout the 1940s. Her radio work included runs in two ongoing radio soap operas. The first, Big Sister, in which she starred as Ruth Evans, aired nationally for five years from 1942. After it ended, she acted in the serial Crossroads of Life. She won the Macquarie Radio Award in 1947 and, in 1949, again acted on film, playing family matriarch Jane O'Riordan in Charles Chauvel's epic Sons of Matthew.

== Touring England ==
In 1951 she travelled to London, where she was later joined by her former Sydney housemate, actress Gwen Plumb. Scott acted on the London stage, appearing in An Evening with Beatrice Lillie at the Globe Theatre, replacing Constance Carpenter, who had left for America. Scott also did her first television work in the UK, working on a BBC comedy series and hosting her own show, How to Manage Men.

Scott as Claire Houghton, and Abigail as screen daughter Bev

== Television acting and directing ==
She returned to Australia in 1957, where her acting career continued on television. She acted in the early soap opera The Story of Peter Grey (1961), the role of Lady Mayoress in the 1965 ABC science fiction series The Stranger, followed by appearances in the rural serial Bellbird and guest roles in Skippy the Bush Kangaroo, Adventure Unlimited and Delta.

Scott also worked as a director on the opening night show of Channel Ten Sydney in 1965, titled TV Spells Magic, and did a stint as director on the daily chat show The Gwen Plumb Show. She continued to act in the theatre, performing with Ray Milland in Hostile Witness at Sydney's Tivoli Theatre in 1967, and in 1968 acted in J.C. Williamson's production of Spring and Port Wine, playing Daisy Crompton opposite Alfred Marks.

Following this came the role of imperious Point Piper socialite Claire Houghton, the mother of Abigail Rogan's character Bev, in the television soap opera Number 96 starting in 1972. The role of Claire had been devised by the show's creator David Sale specifically for Thelma Scott. Claire became a popular recurring character in the serial, initially despairing at the "shabby" apartment block Number 96 that her daughter Bev Houghton chose to live in. She soon befriended other residents such as Don (Joe Hasham) and Vera (Elaine Lee), and formed business associations with Jack (Tom Oliver) and Maggie (Bettina Welch). These associations sustained Claire's continued role in the series after the death of Bev in January 1974, and formed the basis for her inclusion in the feature film version of the series released in 1974. Though Claire's appearances diminished in the serial's middle years, she was relaunched into the show for its final few months, and was central to several key storylines during the 1977 episodes. Serena, a small black poodle owned by the actress, sometimes appeared as Claire's pet, Serena, in these final episodes. Claire's signature phrase in the series was "Allow me to be the best judge of that".

After Number 96 ended in 1977 Scott continued to act on Australian television, making a guest appearance in Glenview High (1977), and sustaining a role in the medical serial The Young Doctors in 1980. She later played the recurring role of Mrs. Jennings in the soap opera Richmond Hill in 1988.

== Personal life ==
Thelma Scott was the lifelong partner of Gwen Plumb. For many years she and Plumb lived in Kirribilli. They also had a house at Whale Beach where they hosted luncheons for show business colleagues. Plumb died on 5 June 2002. Four-and-a-half years later, Thelma Scott died of a heart attack at the Royal North Shore Hospital, in Sydney. She was 93 years old, a fact noted by all the obituary writers who referred to her as the 'grand dame' of Australian actors.

== Filmography ==
=== Films ===
Year	Title	Role	Type
1931	The Haunted Barn		Feature film
1933	Harmony Row		Feature film
1933	Diggers in Blighty	Judy Fisher	Feature film
1934	A Ticket in Tatts	Dorothy Fleming	Feature film
1949	Sons of Matthew (aka The Rugged O'Riordans)	Jane O'Riordan	Feature film
1959	The Seagull	Irina Arkadina	TV movie
1959	Bodgie		TV movie
1960	Shadow of a Pale Horse		TV movie
1963	A Dead Secret	Henrietta Spicer	TV movie
1974	Number 96	Claire Houghton	Film version

=== Television ===
Year	Title	Role	Type
1961	The Story of Peter Grey		TV series
1965	The Stranger	Lady Mayoress	TV series, episode 12: The Lady Mayoress
1965	Adventure Unlimited		TV series, episode: The Silver Backed Brushes
1966	The Interpretaris	Marsha	TV miniseries, episode: Strange Assignment
1967	Bellbird		TV series
1968	Skippy the Bush Kangaroo	Mrs. Winthrop	TV series, episode: Double Trouble
1969	Delta	Mrs Osmond	TV series, episode: The Trouble with Daisy
1972-77	Number 96	Claire Houghton	TV series, 76 episodes
1978	Glenview High	Kathleen	TV series, episode: Old Soldiers
1980	The Young Doctors	Isabel Phelps	TV series, episode #1.872
1988	Richmond Hill	Mrs. Jennings	TV series

== Theatre and radio productions ==
Production	Year	Type	cCaracter	Playwright
The Play's the Thing (play)	1931	Theatre	?	based on a series of Canadian plays, produced by Gregan McMahon
Magic	1931	theatre (spoken word)	Patricia Carleon	?- produced by Gregon McMahon
Six Characters in Search of an Author	theatre (spoken word)	The Stepdaughter	unknown produced by Gregon McMahon	
Jonah and the Whale	1932	theatre (spoken word)	performer	James Bridie
Too Good To Be True	1933	Theatre (spoken word)		George Bernard Shaw
Dear Brutus	1933	theatre (spoken word)		J.M. Barrie
Ten Minute Alibi (play)	1934	radio play	Betty Findon	Anthony Armstrong (writer)
Wind in the Rain	1944	Theatre (spoken word)		Merton Hodge
Take Two From One		Theatre		
An Evening with Beatrice Lillie		Theatre	as herself	
Children in Uniform	1933	Theatre	Marge	Christa Winsloe
Hostile Witness	1967	Theatre		Jack Roffey
Spring and Port Wine	1968	Theatre (spoken word)		Bill Naughton
The Constant Nymph	1931	Radio play	Teresa Sanger	based on novel by Margaret Kennedy (* this version is produced by Gregoa McMahon)
Big Sister	unspecified	Radio series	Ruth Evans	Lynn Foster (scriptwriter) broadcast 2UW, produced by the Macquarie Network for 3AW
Crossroads of Life	unspecified	Radio series		script's by Lunn Foster broadcast 2KO, 2UW
Blue Hills	unspecified.	Radio serial		Gwen Meredith (as writer)
