= Lyndon Dadswell =

(1908–1986) sculptor and technical college teacher

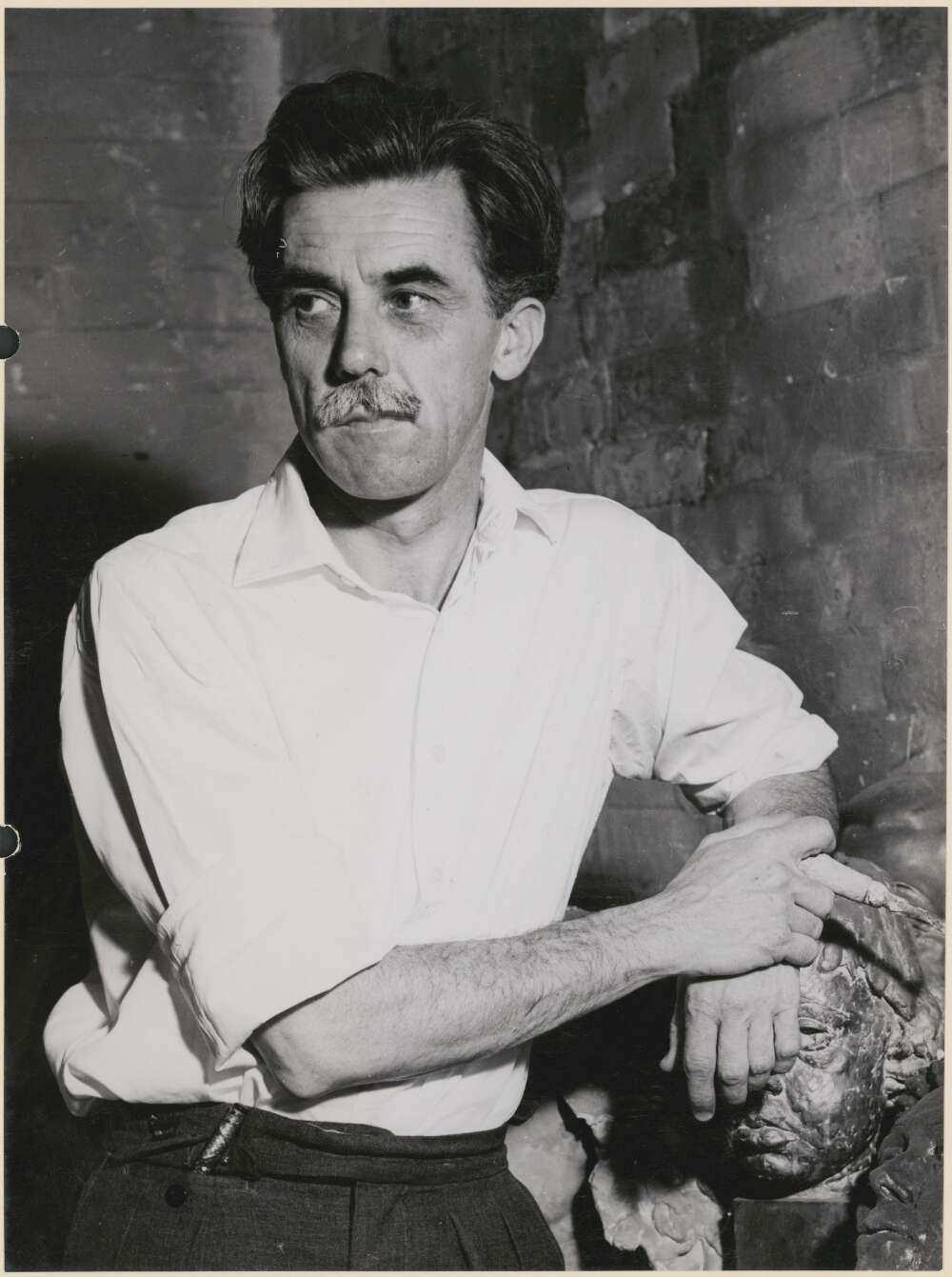
- Born: Lyndon Raymond Dadswell; 18 June 1908; Stanmore, New South Wales, Australia
- Died: 7 November 1986 (aged 78); Mosman, New South Wales, Australia
- Education: Sydney Technical College, National Art School
- Known for: Australian War Memorial sculptures
- Awards: Wynne Prize (1931)

Lyndon Raymond Dadswell (18 January 1908 – 7 November 1986) was an Australian artist, remembered as the country's first official war sculptor.

== History ==
Dadswell was born in Stanmore, Sydney, the son of Arthur Raymond Dadswell and his wife Maysel Cobcroft Dadswell, née Pidgeon. He was educated at the Sydney Church of England Grammar School ("Shore") and attended Julian Ashton's Sydney Art School 1924–1925 and East Sydney Technical College 1926–1929 under Rayner Hoff, where he early showed an interest in sculpture, and joined Paul Montford, who was working on Melbourne's Shrine of Remembrance, for which he completed twelve bas-relief panels, gaining a reputation as an academic sculptor.

He returned to Sydney in 1932 and began experimenting with the Art Deco style characteristic of much work in Sydney in the 1920s and 1930s.

He received several major commissions, and in 1933 won the Wynne Prize for his statue Youth in the Art Gallery of New South Wales, enabling him to travel to London and enrol in several Royal Academy schools. There he was influenced by the work and teaching of Henry Moore, Barbara Hepworth, Carl Milles, Jacob Epstein, and Frank Dobson.

He returned to Australia in 1937 and gained a teaching position with the East Sydney Technical College.

In 1940 he enlisted with the 2nd AIF, serving with the 2/3rd Battalion in Greece, Libya and Syria, where he was seriously wounded in Syria in June 1941, resulting in a partial loss of sight. Commissioned as a lieutenant, he was appointed a war artist at the Military History Section, Heliopolis, Egypt, for a time sharing a studio with Ivor Hele, and in late 1941 was given the young artist John Dowie as an assistant.

He was repatriated to Sydney, where in December 1942 he resigned his commission and completed the plaster model for his sculpture Greece in July 1943. He rejoined the East Sydney Technical College (later National Art School), where in 1966 he was appointed head of the Fine Arts section in 1966.

In 1951 he was a founder, with Margel Hinder and Robert Klippel, of the Sculpture Society of New South Wales, whose "First Impressions" exhibitions gave emerging artists an opportunity to exhibit their work in progress to the general public.

Dadswell's works are currently held in the collections of the National Gallery Victoria, the National Portrait Gallery, Australian War Memorial, National Gallery NSW, and Museum of Contemporary Art.

== Gallery of works ==
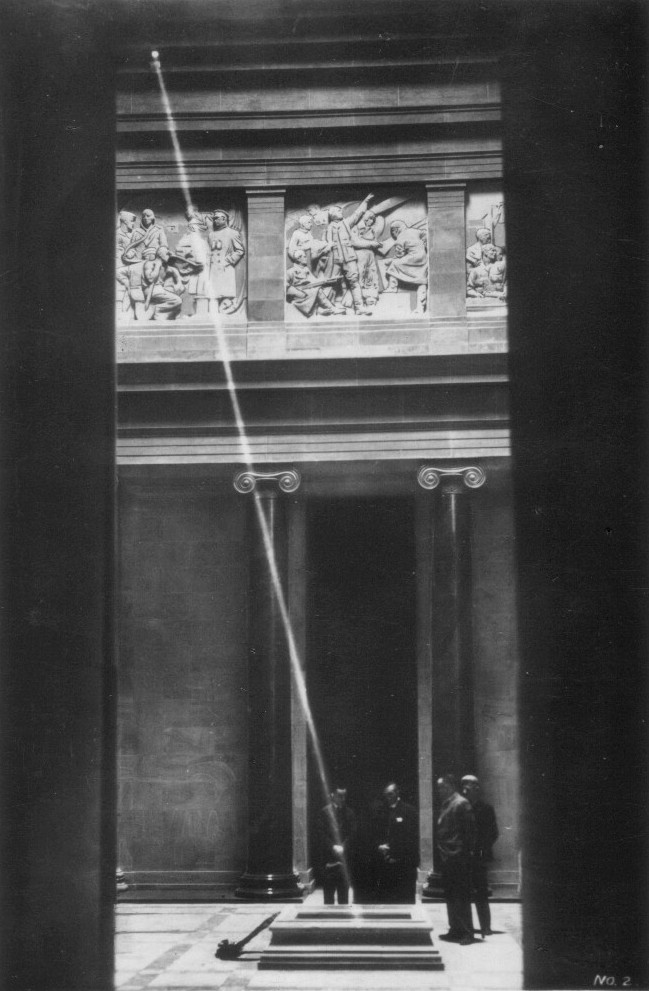
Dadswell designed and created 12 panels for the inner sanctuary of the Shrine of Remembrance, Melbourne.

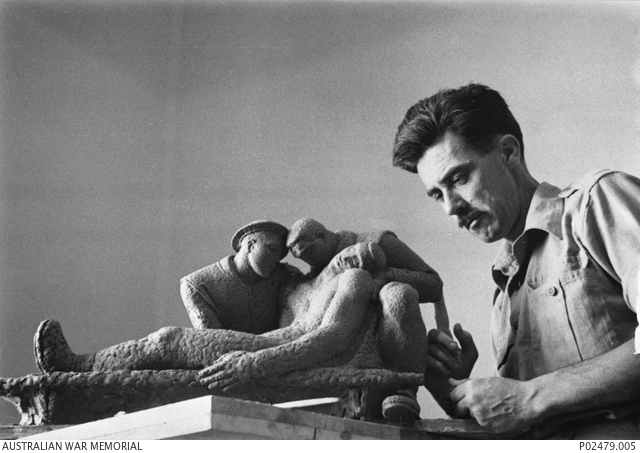
Dadswell inspects his plaster model of the sculpture "Stretcher".

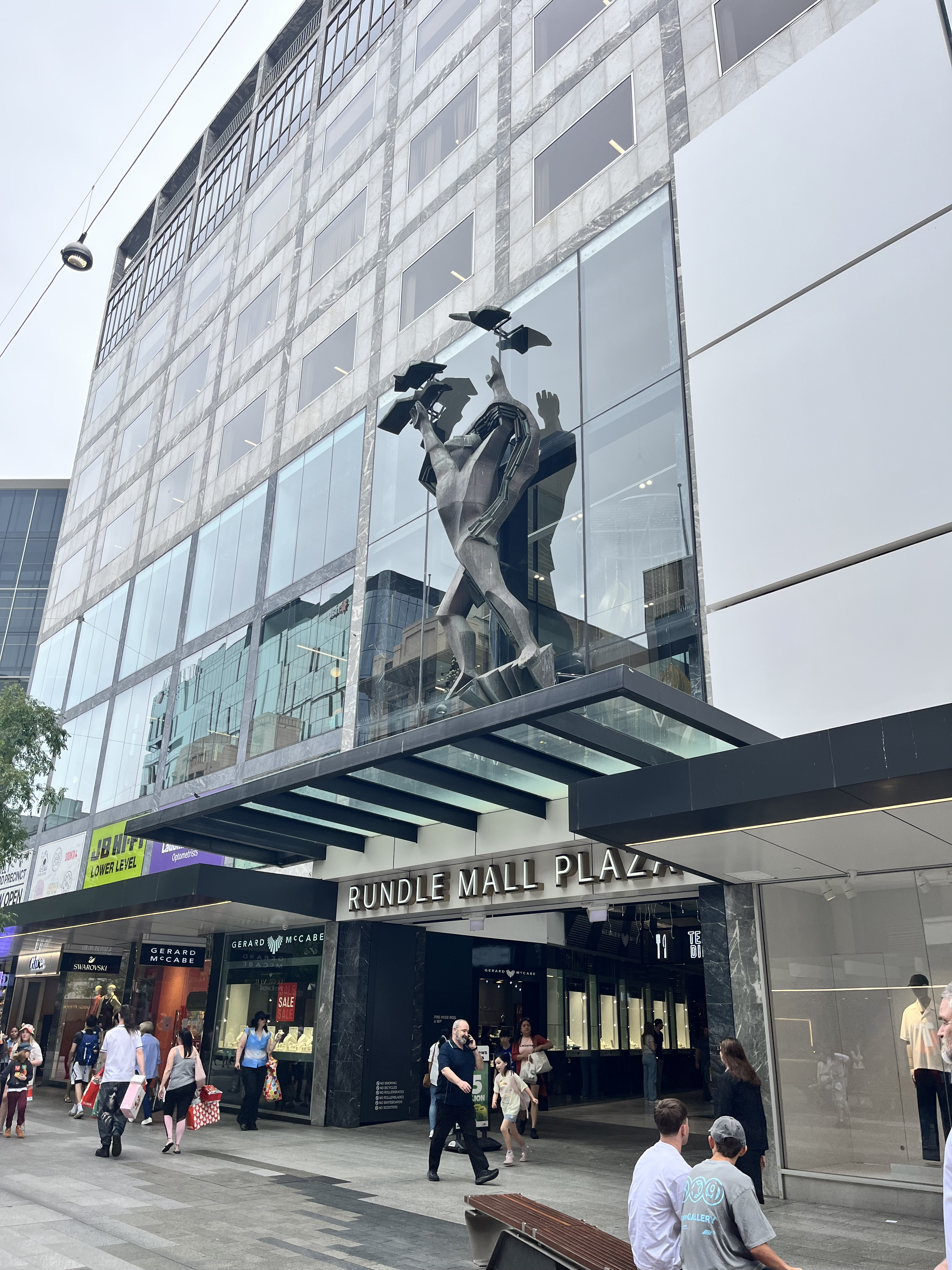
"Progress" installed on the Rundle Plaza building, Adelaide.

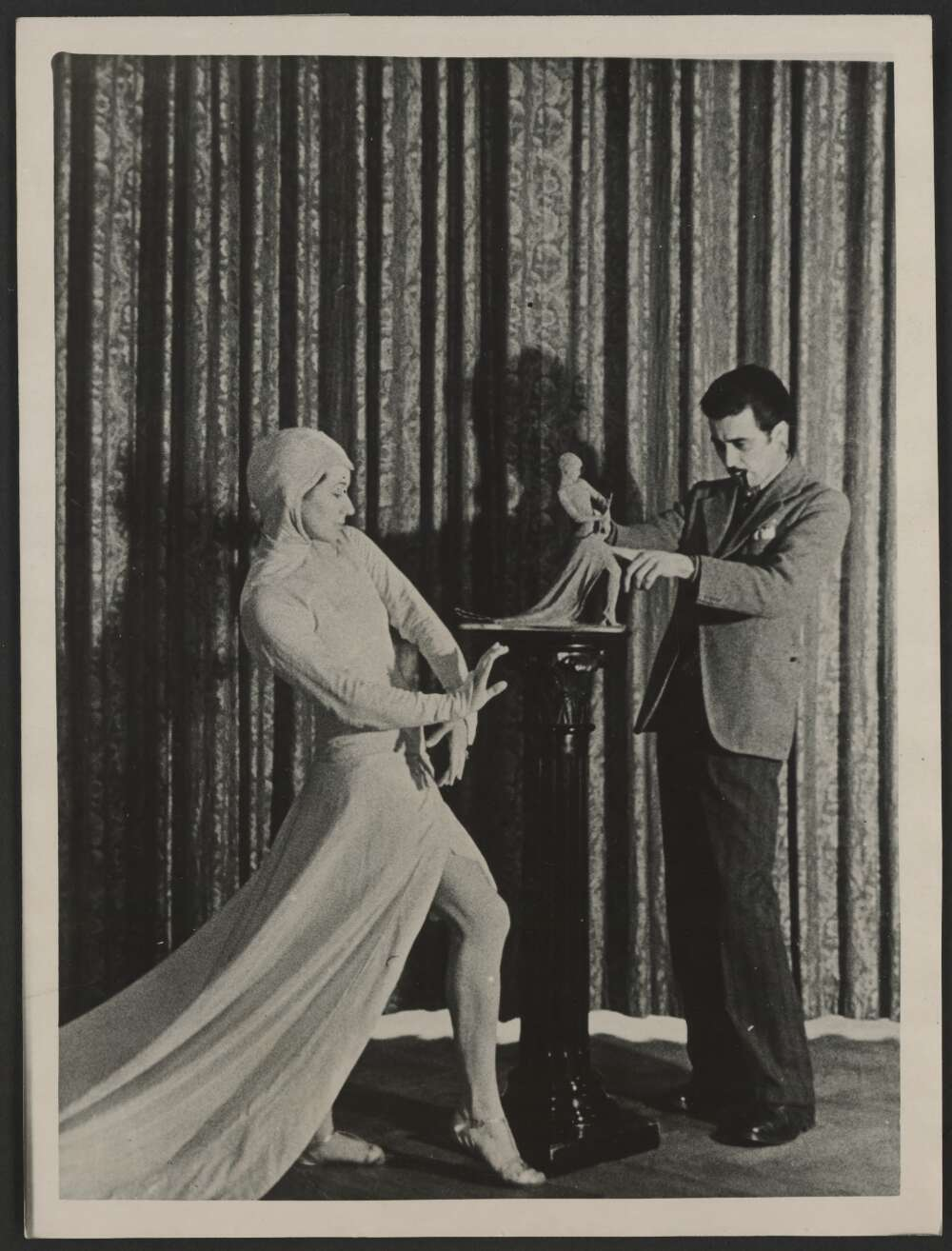
Lyndon Dadswell working on his sculpture of dancer and choreographer, La Meri, posing in costume from the 'White Peacock.

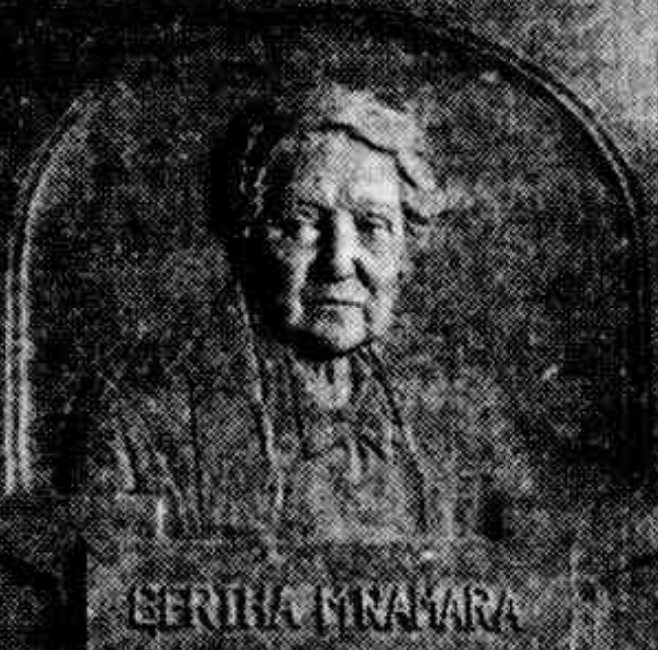
Bronze of Australian writer Bertha McNamara.

== Personal ==
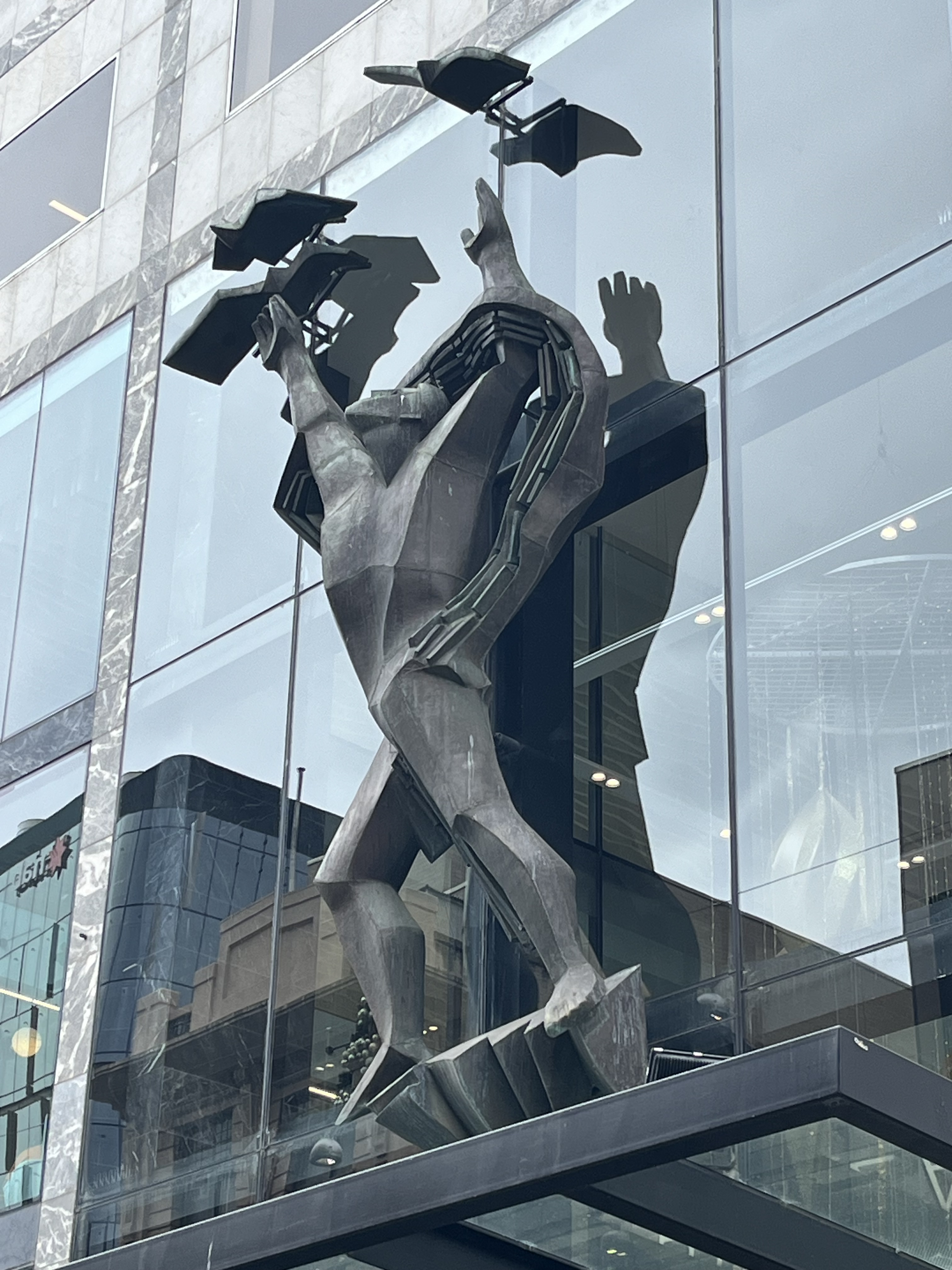
Lyndon Dadswell created a sculpture, "Progress" for the façade of the David Jones building in Rundle Mall, Adelaide in 1959. The sculpture was cleaned and moved to the relocated Rundle Plaza store in 2018.

Dadswell married Elza (born Eliza) Antoinette Ruth Stenning (1910–1994) at Prahran on 24 May 1930. Elza in 1928 starred in the film The Devil's Playground which, due to an export ban, was not shown until 1966, and the F. W. Thring film Harmony Row. Their son Paul died from injuries received in a car crash in February 1934 — Dadswell's father was the driver. Elza found further success as an opera singer and was rich and famous while her husband was an impoverished art student. The couple divorced in 1939.

Dadswell married again, to Audrey Margaret Herbert at Mosman on 16 December 1939. They had a daughter Penelope Lynne Dadswell (born 1941) and a son in 1945.

He died at Elizabeth Bay and his remains were cremated. He is represented at the Australian War Memorial, the National Gallery of Australia and most State galleries.
