= Dick McCann =

Dick McCann may refer to:

- Dick McCann (American football) (1910–1967), American football executive
- Dick McCann (comedian), Australian comedian and TV personality
