= The Contact Show =

Australian variety television program

- Genre: Variety
- Starring: Bob Geraghty; George Wallace Jnr
- Country of origin: Australia
- Original language: English
- No. of seasons: 1

Production
- Running time: 60 minutes

Original release
- Network: TCN-9
- Release: 1960 – 1960

The Contact Show was an Australian daytime television variety series which aired on TCN-9 during 1960. Featuring Bob Geraghty and George Wallace Jnr, it featured a mix of comedy and music.

The series proved short-lived.

Aired at 2:00PM in a 60-minute time-slot, the series competed in its time-slot against Your Home and Menus for Moderns on ATN-7 and For Schools on ABN-2.

== See also ==
- List of Australian television series
- The George Wallace Show
- Theatre Royal
