= La Meri =

American dancer (1899–1988)

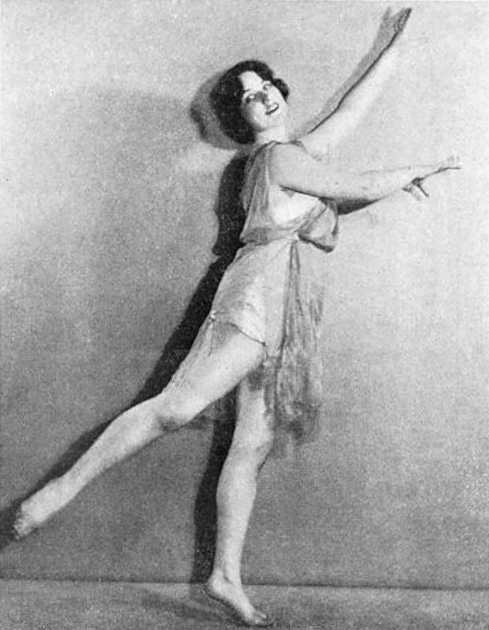
- Performing in The Spanish Gypsy in 1925
- Born: Russell Meriwether Hughes Jr. May 13, 1899; Louisville, Kentucky
- Died: January 7, 1988 (aged 88); San Antonio, Texas
- Education: Kentucky Home School for Girls
- Known for: Dance
- Movement: Folk dance

La Meri (born Russell Meriwether Hughes Jr.; May 13, 1899 – January 7, 1988) was an American ethnic dancer, choreographer, teacher, poet, anthropologist and scholar. She integrated the dance styles of many cultures, most notably those of Spain and India, in her work.

== Early life and training ==
She was born Russell Meriwether Hughes Jr. in Louisville, Kentucky on May 13, 1899. (Note: Some sources give her birth year as 1898, but documents such as the Social Security Death Index list it as 1899.) Her family moved several years later to San Antonio, where she began her dance training, studying ballet, Spanish, and Mexican dance forms. She also studied violin, wrote poetry and acted in amateur productions as a child.

She continued her training in Hawaii, where she studied Hawaiian dance, and then New York, where she studied modern dance and ballet. As she began working professionally, she combined acting, singing, and playing the violin in her performances, including in "prologues", the short live stage productions presented by movie theatre owners before the main feature was shown in the silent film era.

== Career ==
Hughes moved to New York City in the early 1920s, where she worked in vaudeville and Maria Montero's Spanish dance company. There she met her agent and future husband Guido Carreras, who arranged bookings for her in Mexico in 1926, Cuba and Puerto Rico in 1927, and Central and South America from June 1928 to August 1929. Hughes adopted the name La Meri in 1926 after a Mexican journalist shortened her name from "Meri Hughes" to "La Meri".

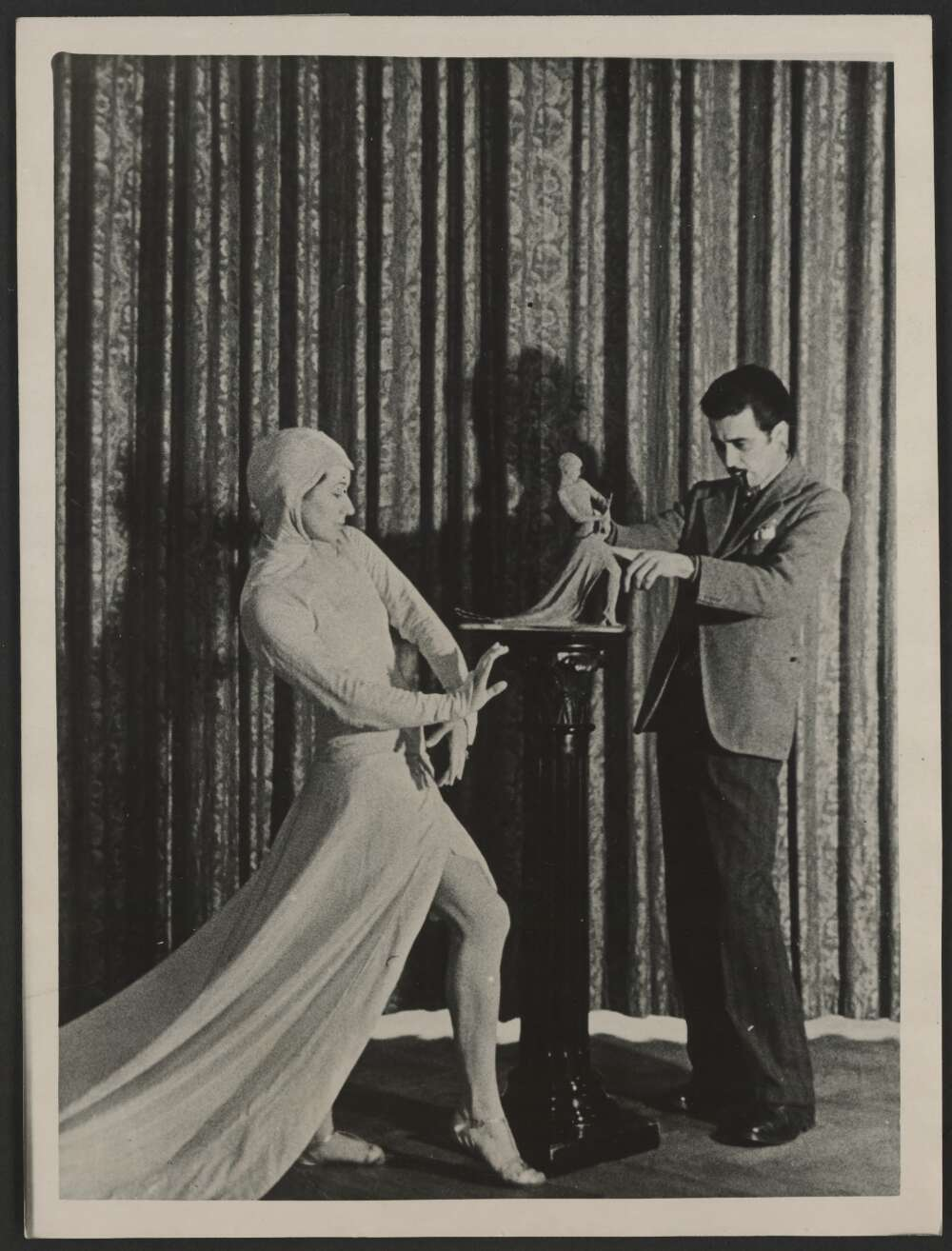
La Meri, posing in costume from the 'White Peacock' in 1930 while Lyndon Dadswell worked on a sculpture.

Her early programs included works of ballet and interpretive dance. In the 1930s, she studied with Indian classical dancer Ram Gopal, one of the early pioneers of the dance of India in the west, who toured with her extensively. Throughout the 1930s she toured and studied in areas such as Central and South America, Europe, North Africa, Australia, New Zealand, Tasmania, India, Burma, Indonesia, the Philippines, China, Japan, Ceylon, and Hawaii. As she traveled, La Meri learned the native dances of the different areas she visited, studying with local dance masters, and acquired recordings of the music and traditional costumes.

She went on to create her own dance works based on the steps and movement vocabularies she learned. Her research into the dance styles of Latin America, Spain, Africa, and Asia allowed her to bring authenticity to the stage in a way that rang true to the roots of each dance style.

When the outbreak of World War II made her international dance tours impracticable, she and her husband settled in New York City, where she and Ruth St. Denis founded the "School of Natya", which is Hindu dance, in 1940. Through the school, La Meri formed The Five Natyas, her first performing company. In 1945 she absorbed the school of Natya into the Ethnologic Dance Center and the Ethnologic Dance Theater, which operated from 1942 to 1956. She also performed at the American Museum of Natural History and presented concert programs of young ethnic-dancers from across the globe. In 1944, she choreographed Swan Lake with the inclusion of Hindu dance movements and hand gestures. She did not change the ballet's music and plot, but added a prologue and a danced fight between the princess and Von Rothbart.

She moved from New York to Cape Cod in 1960, but continued to write extensively and give lecture-demonstrations. While nominally "retired", she founded Ethnic Dance Arts, Inc. and produced an annual summer ethnic dance festival from 1970 to 1979. La Meri also taught regularly at Jacob's Pillow in Becket, Massachusetts and served on its board of directors.

She retired once more in 1980, when she relocated to San Antonio. She died there on January 7, 1988.

== Writings ==
In addition to her memoirs, La Meri published a number of magazine articles and books, including The Gesture Language of Hindu Dance (1941) and Spanish Dancing (1948). The latter book is considered to be a definitive text on the subject of Spanish dance.

In 1938 La Meri published a book Songs and Voyages, with 82 pages of poetry, now very rare. [Livorno -Arti Grafiche S. Belfort & C. 5 Dicembre 1938 - XVII, printed in Italy] According to the frontispiece, her poetry had appeared in American Poetry Magazine, Literary Digest, Braithwaite Anthology, L'Alouette, The Harp, The Dance Magazine, Independent Poetry Anthology, Lariat, Circle, Buccaneer, Contemporary Verse, Interludes, Gammadion, Texas Anthology, Bozart, American Anthology, Poetry Journal, Bright Scrawl, Unicorn, Home Magazine, Present Day Poets, and Wandering Eros.

== Legacy and awards ==
Overall, La Meri's extensive work in ethnic dance, a term she claimed to have created, earned her the reputation of being one of the foremost experts in the field. La Meri's work helped to inspire other choreographers to show respect for dances of cultures not their own, as well as educating the audience. Her anthropological work embodied the values of each ethnicity she used in her choreography and highlighted the importance of integrity in the dance world.

She received the Capezio Dance Award in 1972.
