= Elsa Jacoby =

Australian actress and soprano (1910–1994)

Elsa Jacoby MBE
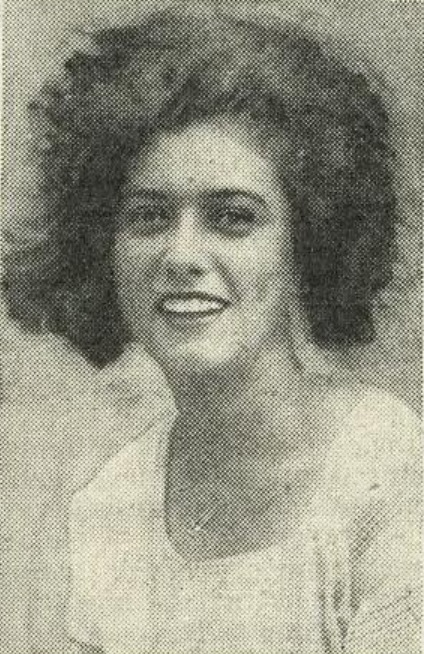
- Stenning in 1930
- Born: Elsa Antoinette Ruth Stenning; 2 May 1910; Neutral Bay, New South Wales, Australia
- Died: 25 March 1994 (aged 83); Vaucluse, New South Wales, Australia
- Other name: Elza Stenning
- Education: North Sydney Girls High School
- Occupations: Actress, soprano opera singer and fundraising patron of the arts
- Employer: Royal Opera House
- Notable work: The Devil's Playground (1928)
- Spouse(s): Lyndon Dadswell (m. 1930, div. 1939); Ian Mathieson Jacoby (m. 1943, div. 1970)
- Children: 3

Elsa Antoinette Ruth Jacoby MBE (née Stenning, 2 May 1910 – 25 March 1994), also known as Elza Stenning, was an Australian actress, soprano opera singer and fundraising patron of the arts.

== Biography ==
Jacoby was born on 2 May 1910 in Neutral Bay, New South Wales, Australia. Her parents were Edwin James Stenning, a builder from England, and his Australian wife Leah Ezna Stenning (née Gutterridge). She had four siblings.

Jacoby was educated at North Sydney Girls High School and started her career in the Australian film industry. Her first major role was in The Devil's Playground (1928), playing the romantic lead, Naneena. Her second film role was in F. W. Thring's musical comedy Harmony Row (1933). During this period, Jacoby worked as a model and took singing lessons to become an opera singer. She performed with the Australian Gilbert and Sullivan Company.

Jacoby married Australian sculptor Lyndon Dadswell on 24 May 1930 in Windsor, Melbourne, Victoria, Australia. They had a son together, who died as an infant after a car accident. The couple moved to London, England, to pursue their careers, but they subsequently divorced. In England, Jacoby sang soprano in grand operas at the Royal Opera House, Covent Garden, London, from 1935 to 1939. She also performed in regional British pantomimes.

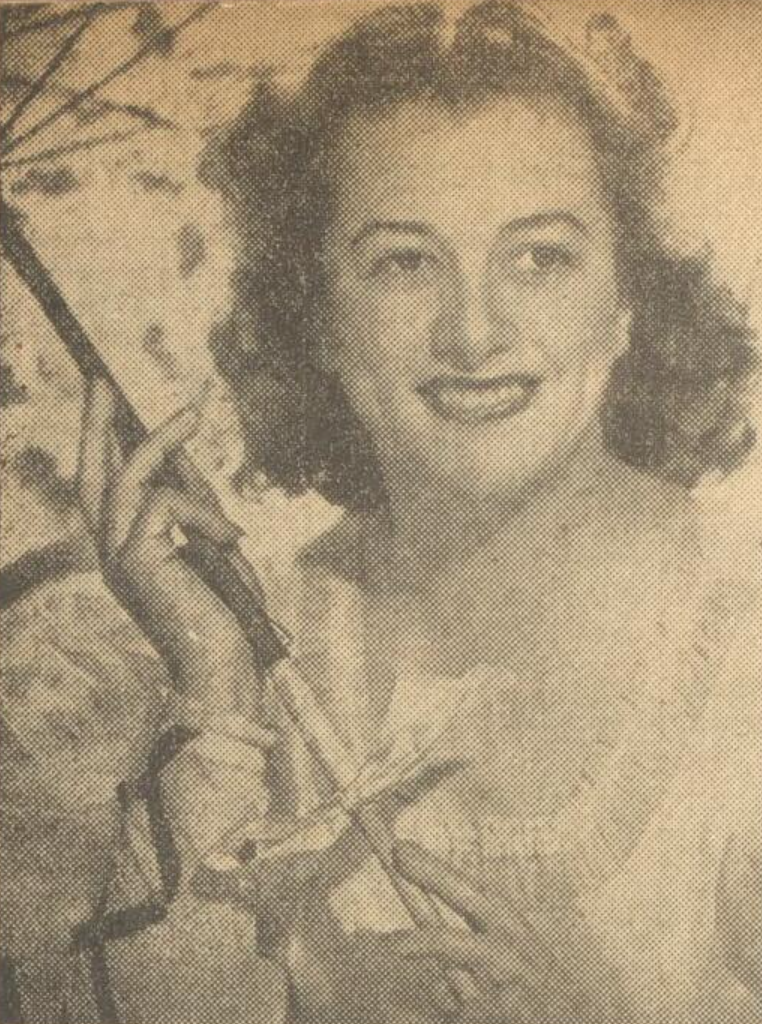
Stenning in 1949

Jacoby met Australian financier Ian Mathieson Jacoby, while living and working in London. He was married when they met and divorced his first wife Hilda in order to marry Jacoby. After returning to Australia, they married on 17 December 1943 in Melbourne.

During World War II, Jacoby worked entertaining Allied troops at concerts in Australia, England, and South Africa.

Jacoby and her husband settled in Hermit Bay, Vaucluse, New South Wales, Australia. She became well known as a society hostess and fundraising patron of the arts, voluntarily raising money for organisations including the Arts Council of Australia (New South Wales division), Australian Elizabethan Theatre Trust, Friends of the Australian Ballet and Sydney Dance Company. In 1960, she became co-deputy president of the Sydney Opera House Ladies’ Committee. She also continued her acting career and starred as Baroness Bronoski in Frank Brittain's drama film The Set (1970), which was partly filmed in her house. She divorced her second husband in 1970 on grounds of adultery.

Sir William Dobell painted Jacoby's portrait in 1967 (Seated Lady in a Blue Dress). She was appointed as a Member of the Order of the British Empire (MBE) in 1972 for services to the community.

Jacoby died on 25 March 1994 in Vaucluse, New South Wales, Australia, aged 83.
