= George Leonard Wallace =

Australian comedian

George Wallace Jnr
- Born: George Leonard Wallace; 16 May 1918; Walkerston, Queensland, Australia
- Died: 30 September 1968 (aged 50); Southport, Queensland, Australia
- Occupations: Comedian; television personality
- Parents: George Stephenson Wallace; Margarita Edith Emma, née Nicholas

George Leonard Wallace known as George Wallace Jnr (16 May 1918 – 30 September 1968), was an Australian comedian, vaudevillian, and television personality.

The son of George Stephenson Wallace, he became a famous comedian in his own right, having considerable success on television in the late 1950s and 1960s, winning Logie Awards in 1963 and 1964.

Wallace's television show, Theatre Royal, which originated in Brisbane, won six consecutive Logie Awards from 1962 to 1967.

== Early and personal life ==
Wallace was born in Walkerston, Queensland to comedian George Stevenson "Onkus" Wallace and Margarita Edith Emma, née Nicholas, and first appeared on stage aged three in Sydney with his father. Wallace married Marjorie Bruce-Clarke on 10 January 1945 at St Philip's Church of England, Sydney.

Wallace died of cerebrovascular disease on 30 September 1968 at Southport, Queensland.

== Professional career ==
Wallace worked the Tivoli circuit in Australia and New Zealand. On 27 December 1948 Wallace started at the Theatre Royal in Brisbane, a ten-week engagement extended to a decade; his four thousand performances at the Royal in revue and pantomime were considered at the time to be a world record for a comedian.

== See also ==
- The Contact Show
- The George Wallace Show
- Theatre Royal
- George Wallace Memorial Logie for Best New Talent
