= The Devil's Playground (1928 film) =

1928 film

- Directed by: Victor Bindley
- Written by: John Bedouin (titles)
- Based on: lyrics of Hell's Highway by Ashley Durham
- Starring: John R. Allen
- Cinematography: Jack Bruce; James Grant; Jack Fletcher
- Edited by: J. Stebbing
- Production company: Fineart Films Productions
- Release date: 1928
- Running time: 8,385 feet
- Country: Australia
- Languages: Silent film English intertitles

The Devil's Playground is a 1928 Australian feature-length film set in the South Seas. It was produced by a largely amateur group from the north shore of Sydney.

== Production ==
The film was made by a largely amateur group who formed a company, Fine art Film, in 1927 with a capital of £2,000.

Their first production was the Pacific Island adventure, Trobriana, which was never released. Scenes were shot on beaches near Sydney and interiors in the Mosman Town Hall. Natives were played by Sydney lifeguards in black face.

It was known during filming as Pearl of the Pacific.

Cast member Elza Stenning married sculptor Lyndon Dadswell in 1930; she had a small part in F. W. Thring's Harmony Row then became an opera star; they divorced in 1939. She married financier Ian Mathieson Jacoby and as Elsa Jacoby became a well-known Sydney society matron.

== Release ==
The film sold to Universal Pictures in England. However, the censor prevented its export. According to the Sydney Morning Herald at the time,

"The Commonwealth censorship regulations specify the following heads under which a film may be condemned:

(a) Blasphemy, indecency, or obscenity; (b) likely to be injurious to morality, or to encourage or incite to crime; (c) likely to be offensive to the people of any friendly nation; (d) likely to be offensive to the people of the British Empire; (e) depiction of any matter the exhibition of which is undesirable in the public interest, or likely to prove detrimental or prejudicial to the Commonwealth. According to the Chief Censor, "The Devil's Playground" violates four out of the five stipulations, namely (a), (b), (d), and (e).

More specifically, relating to (e), the Controller General of Customs O'Reilly thought that showing ill-treatment of natives by Australians or a native revolt in Australian territory (the Trobriand Islands) would be detrimental to Australia's reputation. Not released in Australia, the film "had no more than trade screenings at the time of its production and was not shown publicly until 1966," when it was screened at St Mark's Anglican Church hall, Avalon Beach.
