= His Royal Highness (1932 film) =

1932 film

- Written by: C. J. Dennis; George Wallace
- Based on: stage musical by George Wallace
- Produced by: F. W. Thring
- Starring: George Wallace
- Cinematography: Arthur Higgins
- Music by: Alaric Howitt; George Wallace
- Production company: Efftee Film Productions
- Distributed by: Universal Pictures
- Release date: 1 October 1932
- Running time: 84 minutes (Australia)
- Country: Australia
- Language: English
- Budget: £19,000 or £11,000
- Box office: £20,000

His Royal Highness is a 1932 Australian musical film directed by F. W. Thring, also known as His Loyal Highness (Australia alternative title and title in the United Kingdom), starring George Wallace in his feature film debut. It was the first Australian film musical.

== Plot ==
Tommy Dodds (George Wallace) is a stage hand who has a crush on Molly. He is knocked unconscious and dreams he is the King of Betonia. He scandalises the court by gambling with footmen and teaching his Prime Minister to roller skate, and uncovers a conspiracy by Torano and Yoiben.

The rightful heir to the throne is discovered and Tommy is no longer king. He wakes up from his dream and sees that Molly is interested in someone else.

== Cast ==
- George Wallace as Tommy Dodds / King of Betonia
- Byrl Walkley as Yoiben
- Frank Tarrant as Hozzan
- Donalda Warne as Barbette
- Lou Vernon as Torano
- Marshall Crosby as Alfam
- John Fernside as Giuseppe
- John Dobbie as Jim
- Nell Taylor as Molly
- Mona Barlee
- Clem Milton as Prime Minister
- Cyril Scott
- Edwin Brett as Asher Marmaduke

== Original play ==
His Royal Highness
- Written by: George Wallace
- Original language: English
- Genre: comedy revue

Premiere
- Date premiered: 1926

The film was based on a stage show of two acts and seven scenes which Wallace had written and appeared in the 1920s. It was one of a series of "revusicals" written by Wallace during this period. Filmink noted it was one of many "silly musicals set in exotic fictitious locations" that were popular at the time.

=== Plot ===
Tommy Dodd working at a New York pie stall, where he is discovered by Alfam and Torano from the European kingdom of Betonia. They are looking for the missing heir to the throne and decide Tommy is it. They ship him off to Betonia, which is located on the Adriatic, where he is acclaimed heir. He is placed under the control of Yioben, an elderly female charged with training him in the royal ways. Tommy eventually discovers that he is not the true heir and another member of court is. He leaves Betonia, but with enough money to buy his own pie stall.

== Production ==
Wallace collaborated on the script with C. J. Dennis. Filming began in February 1932. It was shot at Efftee's studio at His Majesty's Theatre in Melbourne. The set of the royal palace in Betonia cost £7,000.

Donalda Warne was an emerging stage star, who soon afterwards went to Britain to seek fame. Composer Alaric Howitt was from Melbourne but had recently spent two years working in America.

Raymond Longford later claimed he worked on the movie.

== Reception ==
Despite some unenthusiastic reviews the film was a popular success at the box office, launching George Wallace as a film star. Herc McIntyre of Universal called him Australia's first film star.

Thring sold the film to Britain along with Diggers (1931) and The Sentimental Bloke (1932) and some shorts for £100,000. Of these, His Royal Highness proved the most popular in Britain, where it was widely screened, in reportedly over 1000 cinemas. It also received good reviews from the English trade papers, which had previously been critical of On Our Selection. It also enjoyed more popularity at the box office.

After World War II Pat Hanna bought the rights to distribute this and some other Efftee films and enjoyed some success.

Filmink magazine later said "it's a movie of its time and the musical numbers are fairly ropey but Wallace's tremendous talent remains evident."

== Notes ==
- Fitzpatrick, Peter, The Two Frank Thrings, Monash University, 2012
