= John Dobbie =

Australian actor

John Dobbie (1903–1952) was a popular Australian actor of theatre and film in the first half of the 20th century.

Tall and heavyset, he frequently appeared alongside the diminutive comedian George Wallace, first in vaudeville and then following Wallace into early local talkies.

Dobbie reportedly also worked for a time in America with Mae West. He became a sports broadcaster and settled in Surfers Paradise, Queensland.

== Select credits ==
- Jewelled Nights (1925)
- His Royal Highness (1932)
- Harmony Row (1933)
- A Ticket in Tatts (1934)
- Gone to the Dogs (1939)
