= Theatre Royal (Australian TV series) =

Australian vaudeville variety television program

- Genre: Vaudeville/variety
- Written by: George Wallace Jnr
- Directed by: George Wallace Jnr
- Presented by: George Wallace Jnr
- Country of origin: Australia
- Original language: English
- No. of seasons: 8

Original release
- Network: BTQ-7
- Release: 1961 – 1968

Theatre Royal is a Logie award-winning Australian vaudeville variety television show produced at BTQ-7 in Brisbane from 1961 to 1968.

== Overview ==
George Wallace Jnr was the show's main host and star attraction.

The show reproduced the stage of the defunct Theatre Royal in Brisbane, complete with curtains, footlights, stage props, dancing girls, and camera shots replicating the ambience of a bygone era. In 1962 Gladys Moncrieff made guest appearances on the show. Other people appearing on the show included Brian Cahill, Dick McCann, Gay Kayler and Rowena Wallace. One very popular episode of the show was produced at the RAAF Base Amberley.

The show won six consecutive Logie Awards from 1962 to 1967.

== See also ==
- List of Australian television series
- The Contact Show
- The George Wallace Show
