= George Wallace (Australian comedian) =

Australian comedian (1895–1960)

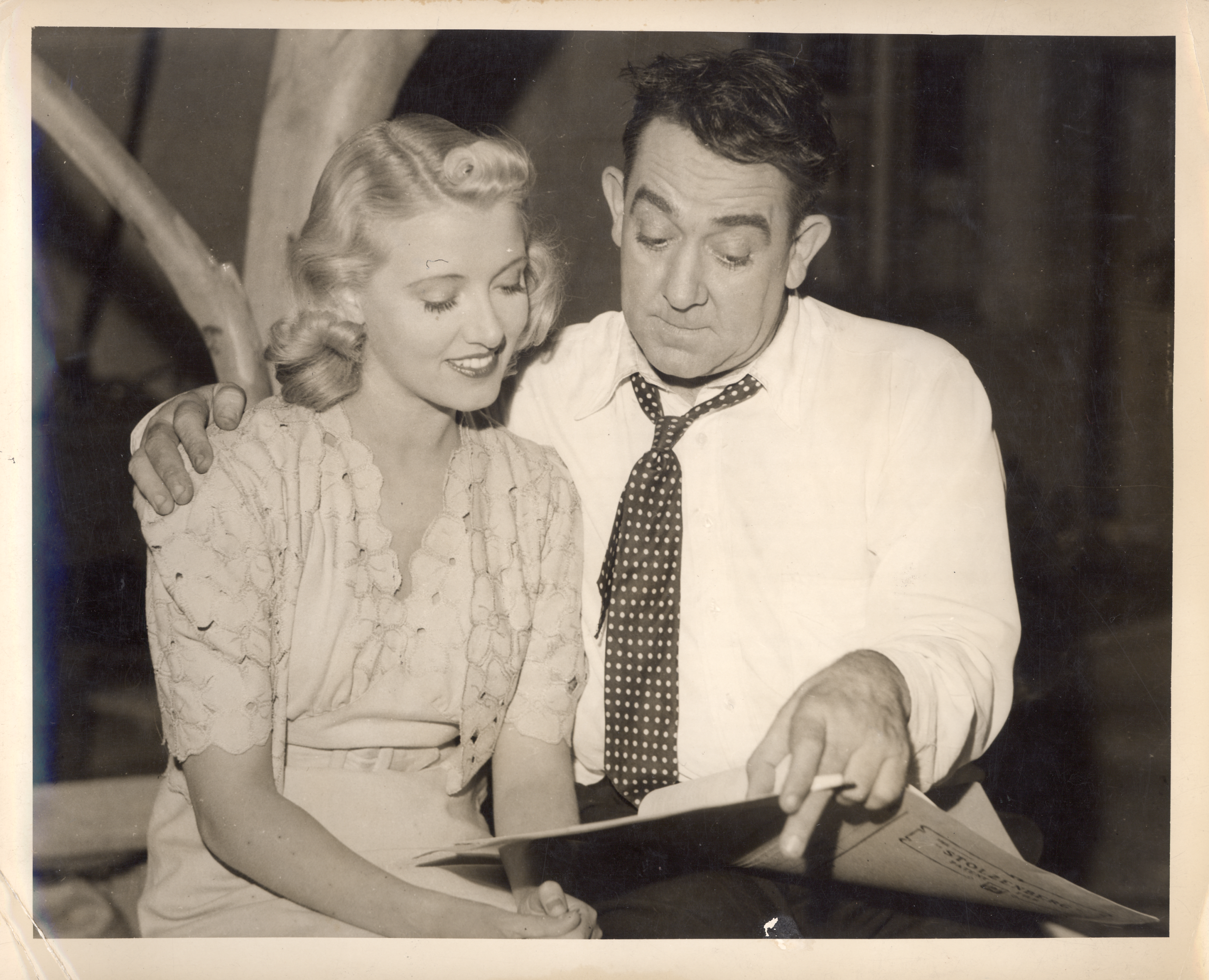
- George "Onkus" Wallace with Lois Green in 1940
- Born: George Stephenson Wallace; 4 June 1895; Aberdeen, New South Wales
- Died: 16 October 1960 (aged 65); Kensington, New South Wales
- Other name: Onkus
- Occupations: Comedian; actor; vaudevillian; radio personality
- Years active: 1919–1957
- Known for: The character Onkus, one half of comedy duo Dinks and Onkus with Jack Patterson (as Dinks)
- Notable work: Duo of Dinks and Onkus
- Children: George Leonard Wallace (known as George Wallace Jnr)

George Stephenson "Onkus" Wallace (4 June 1895 – 19 October 1960), was an Australian comedian, actor, vaudevillian and radio personality. During the early to mid-20th century, he was one of the most famous and successful Australian comedians on both stage and screen, with screen, song and revue sketch writing amongst his repertoire. Wallace was a small tubby man with goggle eyes, a mobile face and croaky voice who appeared in trademark baggy trousers, checkered shirt and felt hat. His career as one of Australia's most popular comedians spanned four decades from the 1920s to 1960 and encompassed stage, radio and film entertainment. Ken G. Hall, who directed him in two films, wrote in his autobiography that George Wallace was the finest Australian comedian he had known.

== Early and personal life ==
George Stephenson Wallace was born in Aberdeen, New South Wales to George Stevenson "Broncho" Wallace, a painter, and Catherine Mary Ann, née Scott. His father toured in minstrel shows, and George junior appeared at age three in a Sydney pantomime. He was in his parents' song-and-dance act until they divorced. He later busked around the Pyrmont waterfront, worked in his stepfather's ink factory, and was a farm-hand and canecutter in North Queensland. He then joined a road show at age sixteen.

Wallace married Margarita Edith Emma Nicholas in Brisbane on 3 January 1917; they moved to Sydney the following year where he played at Newtown Bridge Theatre for £4 a week. Margarita took an on-stage role in the act, later their two-year-old son joined them as a juvenile acrobat. They separated in 1924.

== Professional career ==
In the 1919 he formed a double act with Jack 'Dinks' Patterson as "Dinks and Onkus" (The Two Drunks), created in the style of Stiffy and Mo The pair danced and sang, and for someone who looked like a wharfie (with his barrel chest and short legs) Wallace was surprisingly acrobatic and light on his feet, and the public loved him for his slapstick style and everyman appeal.

Turning solo, Wallace was soon snapped up by the Fuller circuit in Sydney and from there he moved to the Tivoli Theatre circuit, where he was teamed up with British actress Jenny Howard. By the 1920s, he was considered to be one of the "Big Three" most popular performers in Australian comedy. He wrote all of his own scripts and in 1942 penned a song that was to become a World War II standard, "A Brown Slouch Hat with The Side Turned Up".

The 1930s saw George turn his talents to film. He starred in five films, all comedies, and was a big, if not the biggest, Australian star. Three of these, His Royal Highness (1932), Harmony Row (1933) and A Ticket in Tatts (1934), were directed by F. W. Thring for Thring's company, Efftee Film Productions. Wallace was under contract to Efftee during this time for an estimated £3000 – £5000 per year, during which he also made stage appearances for the company.

He said in 1933 that he turned down an offer from Universal to film in the US.

The other two, Let George Do It (1938) and Gone to the Dogs (1939), were directed by Ken G. Hall for Cinesound Productions.

Wallace's contributions to these films extended beyond his performances. He developed the concepts for His Royal Highness, Harmony Row and A Ticket in Tatts by drawing on his stage revues, and co-wrote Let George Do It and Gone to the Dogs. Wallace's other film work included a 1932 short film, "Oh! What a Night!", which he is said to have directed unofficially. In later years, he was seen in supporting roles in two dramatic films, The Rats of Tobruk (Charles Chauvel, 1944, Australia) and Wherever She Goes (Michael Gordon, 1953, USA/Australia).

== Films ==
The five feature films Wallace starred in are among the few surviving examples of his work. As the most sustained series of Australian comedian comedies produced before World War II, these films provide some support for the claim that George Wallace is Australia's equivalent of Charles Chaplin.

In his physical presentation as well as his performance style, George Wallace differed from international stars of slapstick comedy. For instance, his clothing and speech allude to an Australian working-class type and contrast with Charles Chaplin's mock-dapper Tramp persona. The fact that Wallace's performances combine tap-dancing with pratfalls makes him unusual among film comedians anywhere. Moreover, Wallace's films prefigure developments in Hollywood comedy. An example is the fictional country of Betonia in His Royal Highness, which predates satirical depictions of fictional nations in such celebrated films as The Marx Brothers' Duck Soup (1933) and Charles Chaplin's The Great Dictator (1940). Other aspects of Wallace's films that are relatively unusual for the period are the comedic treatment of haunted houses in Harmony Row and Gone to the Dogs and scientific experimentation in Gone to the Dogs, which emphasize the resourcefulness of Australian filmmaking in the face of Hollywood's international dominance.

George Wallace's transition from stage to screen parallels the career progressions of many internationally famous vaudeville performers in a period when movies' popularity was eclipsing live theatre. However, the financially struggling Australian film industry of the 1920s and 1930s provided fewer opportunities than Hollywood did.

Although Wallace continued to work after World War II, with a successful career in radio and on stage as well as occasional film roles, his film career never returned to its 1930s peak. This was undoubtedly influenced by factors outside his control, such as F. W. Thring's death in 1936 and Cinesound Productions' decision to cease feature film production in 1940. Indeed, the films that Wallace stars in defy the fact that the Australian film industry was already struggling to survive. These films continue to be a high point of Australian screen comedy.

His work on radio in the 1940s includes The Road Show, in which he played an outrageous female bus conductor, "Sophie the Sort on the Bus".

== Legacy and influence ==
The films Wallace made with F. W. Thring influenced subsequent Australian comedians who successfully made the transition from stage to television and then film, such as Barry Humphries, Paul Hogan and the Frontline team. Unlike many Australian comedies made before World War II, Wallace's films do not celebrate the bush as "the essence of Australianness". Instead, these films are significant for reflecting Australian comedy's movement away from the bush to emphasise urban settings, which would become more prevalent in later Australian comedy. However, the full significance of Wallace's films in relation to later Australian screen comedy is perhaps yet to be understood.

His career as one of Australia's most popular comedians spanned four decades from the 1920s to 1960 and encompassed stage, radio and film entertainment. Ken G. Hall, who directed him in two films, wrote in his autobiography that George Wallace was the finest Australian comedian he had known.

In recent decades, George Wallace has been the subject of a documentary film, Funny By George: The George Wallace Story and a stage show about his life, Falling On My Left Ear: A Show About George Wallace.

Wallace died of chronic bronchitis and emphysema at his home in Kensington, New South Wales.

George Wallace had one child, George Leonard Wallace (George Wallace Jnr.), who became a famous comedian in his own right. He had considerable success on television in the late 1950s, and 1960s winning Logie Awards in 1962 and 1963. George Wallace Jnr's television show, Theatre Royal, which originated in Brisbane, won six Logie Awards from 1962 to 1967.

== Filmography ==
Year	Title	Role	Notes
1931	George Wallace, Australia's Premier Comedian		Short film
1931	Oh, What a Night!		Short film
1932	His Royal Highness	Tommy Dodds	Also credited as writer
1933	Harmony Row	Tom 'Dreadnought' Wallace	Also credited as writer
1934	A Ticket in Tatts		Also credited as writer
1938	Let George Do It	Joe Blake	
1939	Gone to the Dogs	George	Also credited as writer
1944	The Rats of Tobruk	Barber of Tobruk	
1951	Wherever She Goes	Stage Manager	

=== Unmade films ===
- Ginger Murdoch (1930s)
- A Sweepin in the Deep
- Collits Inn

== Select theatre credits ==
- A Fireman's Troubles (1919) – Sydney
- Act with Jack Paterson, Dinks and Onkus (circa 1919–23) – Harry Clay Sydney suburban circuit
- Mulligan's Mixup (1921) – revusical
- Two Days Out (1921) – revusial
- In a Ballroom (1922) – revusical
- Over the Hills, Tally Ho (1922) – revusical
- Fullers Theatres New Zealand tour (1924)
- George Wallace Revue Company (1924–30) – revue – various
- A Dancing Delirium (1924) – revusical
- Some Night (1924) – revusical
- Alpine Antics (1924) – revusical
- The Pickled Porter (1924) – revusical
- Off Honolulu (1924) – revusical
- Harmony Row (1924) – revusical
- The Oojah Bird (1924) – revusical
- At the Cross Roads (1924) – revusical
- Lads of the Village (1924) – revusical
- Midnight Revels (1924) – revusical
- Dangerous Dan (1925) – revusical
- Athletic Frolics (1925) – revusical
- Money and Matrimony (1925) – revusical
- The Sparklers (1925) – revusical
- Rising Tides (1926) – revusical
- Night Lights (1926) – revusical
- Happy Moments (1926) – revusical
- Scrambled Fun (1926) – revusical
- His Royal Highness (1927) – revusical
- Married Bliss-ters (1928) – revusical
- Bald Heads (1928) – revusical
- Me and My Girl (1929) – revusical
- S.S. Sunshine (1929) – revusical
- Cinderella (1931) – Melbourne
- Frank Neil Musical Comedy Revue (1932) – Brisbane
- Collits' Inn (1933–34) – musical – Melbourne, Sydney
- Oh What a Night (1933) – revusical
- The Beloved Vagabond (1934) – Melbourne, Sydney
- Business as Usual (1939) – revue – Tivoli Circuit
- The Crazy Show (1940) – revue
- Beauty on Parade (1945) – revue – Melbourne
- Gay Fiesta/Mother Goose (1951) – Adelaide
- Thanks for the Memory (1953–56) – revue – Melbourne, Sydney, Adelaide
- A Night of Pink Champagne (1954) – revue – Melbourne
- The George Wallace Show (1955) – revue – Broken Hill
- Pin Up Parade (1955) – revue
- The Good Old Days (1956–57) – revue – started Sydney then toured to Melbourne, Adelaide, Brisbane and throughout New Zealand, then returning to Sydney

== Radio ==
- The George Wallace Programme (1942)
- Trial by Music (1948)
- George Wallace's Barn Dance (1949)
- The George Wallace Road Show (1949–50)
- The George Wallace Show (1950–53)

== See also ==
- Roy Rene
- George Leonard Wallace
