= Dick McCann (comedian) =

Dick McCann is an Australian retired comedian and TV personality, based on Brisbane's Channel 7 in the late 1960s and early 1970s. In addition to performing on Theatre Royal (1960–69), he presented the Children's Cottee's Happy Hour in the afternoon.

He is well remembered for his character Beanpole due to his lanky appearance.

He ran the St Lucia Newsagent shop in Brisbane in the 70s.

McCann won three Logie Awards,

- 1965 Most Popular Male. (Queensland)
- 1969 Best Male Personality (Queensland)
- 1970 Best Local Show (Queensland)
