= Your Home =

Australian television show

- Genre: Lifestyle
- Presented by: Del Cartwright
- Country of origin: Australia
- Original language: English

Production
- Running time: 30 minutes (original); 60 minutes (later episodes)

Original release
- Network: ATN-7
- Release: 3 December 1956 – 3 September 1964

Your Home is an early Australian television show that aired on Sydney station ATN-7 from 3 December 1956 to circa 3 September 1964. It was one of the first series produced by the station.

Hosted by Del Cartwright, the series was aimed at housewives of the period. Originally broadcast five days a week, it was eventually cut back to four days. Running time was originally thirty minutes but eventually became sixty minutes.

== Examples of format ==
The episode aired 10 September 1957 featured a demonstration of judo, while Cartwright and Marjorie Long discussed various uses of vegetables. In the episode broadcast 8 October 1957, there was an appearance by the cast of Pajama Game, an interview with choreographer Betty Pounder, and tumbling act by the Flying Garlands. In the 12 November 1957 episode, Cartwright interviewed dancers George and Mavis Weiss, interviewed Cedric Ashton of the Rockdale Opera Company, while someone named Mr. Cordony created a hairstyle for teenagers. In the 10 December 1957 episode, Dawn Anderson showed holiday wear, Ted Maloney cooked a fish mousse, plus there was Scottish and Irish dancing.

== Episode status ==
Five 1960s-era episodes are listed as being held by National Film and Sound Archive. One of the episodes has a listed running time of 22 minutes and 55 seconds, which is consistent with daytime series historically having more minutes of ads than prime-time series. It is not known if any additional episodes exist of the series.
