= Harmony Row (film) =

1933 film

- Written by: George Wallace
- Based on: stage show by George Wallace
- Produced by: F. W. Thring
- Starring: George Wallace; Phyllis Baker
- Cinematography: Arthur Higgins
- Production company: Efftee Film Productions
- Distributed by: Universal Pictures
- Release date: 11 February 1933
- Running time: 78 mins
- Country: Australia
- Language: English
- Budget: £11,000
- Box office: £18,000

Harmony Row is a 1933 Australian musical comedy directed by F. W. Thring and starring popular stage comedian George Wallace. It marked the film debut of Bill Kerr.

== Plot ==
George enlists in the police force and is assigned to Harmony Row, a haunt of criminals such as Slogger Lee. He makes several friends, including the pretty street musician Molly, and boy soprano Leonard. He is persuaded to fight Slogger Lee in a boxing tournament. He manages to defeat Slogger, and is united with Molly.

== Cast ==
- George Wallace as Contable Dreadnought
- Phyllis Baker as Molly
- Marshall Crosby as the sergeant
- John Dobbie as Slogger Lee
- Bill Kerr as Leonard
- Bill Innes as Detective Brooks
- Edwin Brett as the father
- Norman Shepherd as the butler
- Norman French as the husband
- Bebe Scott as the wife
- Gertrude Boswell as the housekeeper
- Leonard Stephens as the Ferrett
- Dan Thomas
- Nell Fleming
- Nell Crane
- Elza Stenning
- Thelma Scott
- Dorothy Weeks
- Johnny Marks
- Campbell Copelin

== Original play ==
Harmony Row
- Written by: George Wallace
- Original language: English
- Genre: comedy revue
- Setting: Harmony Row

Premiere
- Date premiered: 23 August 1924
- Place premiered: Newtown Majestic, Sydney

The film was based on a revue Wallace had performed in the 1920s. It was one of a series of "revusicals" written by Wallace during this period.

In Harmony Row Wallace played "Dreadnought" an incompetent policeman.

The Bulletin called it "a fourth-rate coster turn with splashes of local color to make it look like home... a wearisome affair. Only the ballet, George Wallace’s clowning and the boxing scene at the finish save it from being a dreadful example."

The revue was a success and toured throughout Australia.

== Production ==
Wallace and F. W. Thring decided to make a film together resulting in His Royal Highness. This was successful enough to lead to a follow up, and they decided to film Harmony Row. Wallace claimed the two films cost £35,000 between them. In August 1932 Wallace and Thring announced they had signed a five-year contract.

Most of the cast in the movies were stage actors making their film debut. This included Bill Kerr who had been cast by Thring in a proposed movie called Pick and the Duffers. That movie was not made but he was then cast in Harmony Row.

Filming began in Melbourne on 4 July 1932 and was finished in four weeks.

The full version of the film features a haunted house sequence where George unravels a mystery in a mansion. In some versions of the film this sequence was cut and replaced with one where George arrests a high society gentlemen (Campbell Copelin), thinking he's a thief.

== Reception ==
The film was released on a double bill with Diggers in Blighty and was a success at the box office. The two films grossed £8000 in Melbourne and £3070 in two weeks in Sydney. However Thring complained he only received a small portion of returns.

=== Critical ===
The critic from The Sydney Morning Herald called it "the first really successful picture that Efftee Films have produced."

Everyones wrote, "George Wallace again proves his ability as a screen comedian, and George Wallace from now on he must be considered as a box-offlce factor. Harmony Row lacks the production quality of His Royal Highness; it is far less ambitious technically; but it provides considerably more humor."

Variety declared "For local audiences who like their comedy undertone 'Row' is a solid wow. Wallace is the funniest comedian in Australia today, and with his undoubted talent would click anywhere in the world. With either an American or English director back of him, Wallace would be a knockout for any audience anywhere... the comedy is rough, honest, and good for strong local laughs. Gags anywhere else would not register... [the film] becomes somewhat tiresome before final fade-out." Filmink argued this push for a foreign director by Variety was "the sort of knee-jerk, dribbling, fore locking tugging idiotic analysis that plagued Australian movies, and continues to plague it. What it needed was a better director, not a foreign one, and a stronger script."

The film was released in England.

== Re-release ==
Pat Hanna bought the rights to Efftee's films and kept them in circulation for many years. In 1952 Harmony Row and Diggers in Blighty were hugely successful in country towns, prompting them to be re-released in Melbourne.

The Age called it "scarcely more than a vaudevillian mixture of routine situations and weak double-entendres. Easily the most interesting item is the precarious tenure of George Wallace's trousers."

Filmink argued it "has all the ingredients to be a very good movie... but it's not shaped."

== Notes ==
- Fitzpatrick, Peter, ''The Two Frank Thrings, Monash University, 2012
