= Double Trouble (1951 film) =

- Directed by: Lee Robinson
- Written by: Roland Loewe
- Starring: Frank Waters
- Cinematography: Frank Bagnall
- Edited by: Inman Hunter
- Production company: Australian National Film Board
- Release date: 1951
- Running time: 10 minutes
- Country: Australia
- Language: English

Double Trouble is a docu-drama directed by Lee Robinson about two Australian men intolerant of foreign migrants who find themselves transported to a foreign country.

Unlike most movies from the Australian National Film Board it used professional actors, and gave Lee Robinson invaluable experience directing them prior to his first feature, The Phantom Stockman (1953).

The film has since come to be regarded as historically significant because of its depiction of attitudes towards Australian immigration at the time.

Robinson and editor Inman Hunter later wrote a story for a drama film together which became The Siege of Pinchgut (1959).

== Cast ==
- Frank Waters
- Ken McCarron
- Maurice Travers
- Charles Farrell
