= Joy Cavill =

- Born: 1923
- Died: 1 March 1990 (aged 66–67)
- Occupations: Screenwriter; TV and film producer; associate producer; secretary
- Awards: AWGIE Award

Joy Cavill (1923 – 1 March 1990) was an Australian screenwriter and TV and film producer.

Cavil worked in radio for a number of years before breaking into films as continuity person on King of the Coral Sea (1954). This film started an association with Lee Robinson which went on for many years, and involved her working with him as a secretary, writer, associate producer and producer on a number of projects, notably Skippy the Bush Kangaroo, on which she was sole producer on the third season. She was also close to Chips Rafferty, who nicknamed her "Mother".

In 1964 she travelled to the Tokyo Olympics to film a special on Dawn Fraser. While there she suffered a heart attack. She spent several months recovering then moved to Canada, directing documentaries and TV commercials. In the late 60s she returned to Australia and resumed her association with Robinson.

Without Robinson, she wrote and produced the feature film, Dawn! (1979), a biopic of the Australian swimmer Dawn Fraser, with whom Cavill had a romantic relationship. She is considered one of the pioneer female producers of the Australian film industry.

Among the filmmakers Cavill trained were Lyn McEncroe, Adrian Read, Sue Milliken and Jill Robb. As her obituary stated:

Secretary, continuity girl, associate producer, writer, producer, filmmaker and "Mother:" Joy Cavill was many things to many people. Her outstanding contribution to the Australian film industry and her fine leadership qualities will be missed.

== Selected credits ==
- King of the Coral Sea (1954) – continuity
- Walk into Paradise (1956) – continuity
- Dust in the Sun (1958) – writer
- The Stowaway (1958) – associate producer
- The Restless and the Damned (1959) – associate producer
- No Man Is an Island (1962) – continuity
- The Dawn Fraser Story (1964, documentary) – producer, director
- In Song and Dance (1964) – producer
- Adventure Unlimited (1965) – writer, assoc producer
- The Intruders (1969) – producer
- Skippy the Bush Kangaroo (1968–70) – associate producer, writer
- Nickel Queen (1971) – producer
- Barrier Reef (1971–72) – producer, writer
- Boney (1972–73) – associate producer, writer
- Shannon's Mob (1975–76) – associate producer
- Dawn! (1979) – producer, writer – winner of 1978 Awgie for Best Original Feature Film script
