= Darwin Gateway to Australia =

1946 documentary by Lee Robinson

Darwin: Gateway to Australia is a 1946 Australian documentary. It was one of a series of documentaries made in the Northern Territory by Lee Robinson.

Filming followed Namatjira the Painter and took place over several weeks.
