= This Is the ABC =

1955 Australian documentary

- Directed by: Shan Benson
- Produced by: Maslyn Williams
- Narrated by: Rupert Chance
- Cinematography: Frank Bagnall
- Edited by: Anne Gurr
- Music by: John Antill
- Production company: Department of Interior
- Distributed by: Hoyts
- Release date: 1955
- Running time: 20 minutes
- Country: Australia
- Language: English

This Is the ABC is a 1955 Australian documentary from the Department of the Interior about the Australian Broadcasting Commission. It was directed by Shan Benson.

The documentary focused on the ABC's radio operations (television did not start until 1956) and included scenes of such shows as the news, Blue Hills and Eugene Goossens with the Sydney Symphony Orchestra.

Some interior scenes were shot at Supreme Studios in North Sydney.

== Reception ==
The film was screened at the 1955 Melbourne Film Festival. The Age called it "a highly diverting romp".

The film was given a limited cinema release through Hoyts.

It was also screened on the first night the ABC broadcast television in Sydney. Reviewing it on television, The Australian Women's Weekly called it "a good film, but I saw it twelve months ago in a Brisbane cinema."
