= Flight Plan (film) =

1950 documentary by Lee Robinson and Stanley Hawes

Flight Plan: A Review Of Civil Aviation In Australia Today is a 1950 Australian documentary directed by Lee Robinson and Stanley Hawes for the Australian National Film Board.
