= Outback Patrol =

- Directed by: Lee Robinson
- Produced by: Stanley Hawes
- Narrated by: Chips Rafferty
- Cinematography: Frank Bagnall
- Production company: Australian National Film Board
- Release date: 9 October 1952
- Running time: 20 minutes
- Country: Australia
- Language: English

Outback Patrol is a 1952 documentary about the patrol of a policeman in the Northern Territory outback, Constable Robert Darkin, and the various tasks he must perform. The movie has since become a study text in Australian secondary schools. Robinson said it "was a very successful picture."
