= In Song and Dance =

1964 film

- Directed by: Lee Robinson
- Release date: 1964
- Running time: 27 minute
- Country: Australia
- Language: English

In Song and Dance is a 1964 Australian documentary about the Northern Territory Eisteddfodd held between July 4–13, 1964.
