= Crocodile Hunter =

Crocodile Hunter or crocodile hunter may refer to:

- The Crocodile Hunter, TV documentary series hosted by Steve Irwin and wife Terri Irwin
  - Steve Irwin (1962–2006), star of The Crocodile Hunter
- Crocodile Hunter (film), a 1989 Hong Kong film
- The Crocodile Hunter: Collision Course, 2002 adventure comedy film
- Someone who engages in crocodile hunting

== See also ==
- Crocodile Hunters, a 1949 Australian documentary film
