= The Pearlers =

- Directed by: Lee Robinson
- Produced by: Stanley Hawes
- Cinematography: Frank Bagnall
- Edited by: Jack Rogers
- Music by: Dulcie Holland
- Production company: Australian National Film Board
- Release date: 1949
- Running time: 12 mins
- Country: Australia
- Language: English

The Pearlers is a 1949 documentary film from director Lee Robinson about the pearling industry off the coast of Broome. Robinson later used a similar background for his feature King of the Coral Sea (1954).

The film was released to cinemas as a support feature, which was not common at the time, and has since come to be regarded as a minor classic of Australian documentary filmmaking.
