= Janice Dinnen =

Australian actress (1945–1974)

- Born: Janice Gail Dinnen; 10 December 1945; Bondi, New South Wales, Australia
- Died: 26 January 1974 (aged 28); St Pancras, London, United Kingdom
- Occupations: Actress, model
- Years active: 1958–1970
- Known for: The Stranger (1964–1965); The Flying Swan (1965); The Battlers (1968)
- Spouse: John Weiley
- Children: 2

Janice Dinnen (10 December 1945 – 26 January 1974) was an Australian actor of stage, film, and theatre.

== Early life ==
Dinnen's parents emigrated to Australia from Finsbury Park, London in 1940. Dinnen was born in Bondi, New South Wales. She was a member of the Great Synagogue Youth Teens and after appearing in a J.Y.C. Drama Festival at the Independent Theatre in Sydney, she became a student of the Independent Theatre Study Group.

== Career ==
Dinnen started out as a model and a child actor. Her first film role was in comedy-drama Smiley Gets a Gun in 1958 (the sequel to Smiley), before landing the role of Anna Koschek at age eleven, in the American Cinerama documentary film South Seas Adventure. She was hired on the spot after only one audition. By the age of 15, she had already acted in two stage productions at Sydney's Independent Theatre, made two television commercials and completed a modelling course at the June Dally-Watkins School of Deportment. In 1961, she had a part in the children's film Bungala Boys.

In 1963 and 1964, Dinnen acted in several stage productions for Sydney's Old Tote Theatre Company, including The Cherry Orchard, Hamlet, The Importance of Being Earnest and Days of Glory.

Dinnen also appeared in the Australian TV plays Ballad for One Gun (about bushranger Ned Kelly) and A Sound of Trumpets. From 1964 to 1965, she played the role of Jean Welsh in the first season of Australian children's science fiction series The Stranger. In 1965, she played Margaret-Anne Baxter in the British miniseries The Flying Swan, and also appeared in the British television play Auto Stop.

In 1968, Dinnen played the recurring role of Donna McCall in Australian series The Battlers, about an Aboriginal boxer, inspired by the true story of Lionel Rose. From 1969 to 1970, she had guest roles in British series The Troubleshooters and Fraud Squad. Her final role was in the 1970 British folk horror film Tam Lin (also known as The Ballad of Tam Lin and The Devil's Widow) alongside Ava Gardner and Ian McShane.

== Personal life and death ==
Dinnen married writer, producer and director John Weiley, and they had two children, including a daughter. Dinnen died in a traffic accident in St Pancras, London on 26 January 1974. She was on the bus home to Ladbroke Grove, riding on the back stairs, when she slipped and was thrown onto the road. She was taken to hospital in serious condition, but died a few days later.

== Acting credits ==
=== Film ===
Year	Title	Role	Notes
1958	Smiley Gets a Gun	Jean Holt	
1958	South Seas Adventure	Anne Koschek	
1961	Bungala Boys	Sylvia	
1970	Tam Lin	Second Coven	

=== Television ===
Year	Title	Role	Notes
1963	Ballad for One Gun	Ellen Sherritt	TV play
1964	A Sound of Trumpets	Pam	TV play
1964	Measure for Measure		TV for schools
1964–1965	The Stranger	Jean Walsh	Season 1, 12 episodes
1965	The Wednesday Play	Moya	Season 2, episode 16: "Auto Stop"
1965	The Flying Swan	Margaret-Anne Baxter	Miniseries, 4 episodes
1968	NET Playhouse	Moya	Season 2, episode 18: "Auto Stop"
1968	The Battlers	Donna McCall	5 episodes
1969	The Troubleshooters	Jenny	Season 5, episode 20: "And One Wise Man Came Out from the East"
1970	Fraud Squad	Nurse Rosalind	Season 2, episode 5: "The Hartland Affair"

=== Radio ===
Year	Title	Role	Notes
	Step into Deep Waters	Del Galvin	

=== Theatre ===
Year	Title	Role	Notes
1963	The Cherry Orchard	Ania	Old Tote, Sydney
1963	Hamlet	Ophelia	Old Tote, Sydney
1964	The Importance of Being Earnest		Old Tote, Sydney
1964	Days of Glory		Old Tote, Sydney
