= Herc McIntyre =

Herc McIntyre was head of Universal Pictures in Australia from 1920 until the 1950s. He was important in the career of Charles Chauvel, helping finance several of his films. He was also friends with Lee Robinson and helped him distribute The Phantom Stockman (1953). Filmink called him " one of the true unsung champions of Australian film production, constantly supporting local movie makers over a forty-year career."

In the 1960s McIntyre was involved with Waratah Productions.
