= The Flying Swan =

Television series

The Flying Swan is a 1965 British TV series starring Margaret Lockwood and her daughter Julia.

It ran for 24 episodes on the BBC. The theme music for the series was composed by Ron Grainer.

== Cast ==
- Margaret Lockwood as Mollie Manning
- Julia Lockwood as Carol Manning
- Molly Urquhart as Jessie McDonald
- Hugh McDermott as Dwight Cooper
- Wendy Hall as Prue
- Gillian Royale as Rosalind
- John Boyd-Brent as George
- Janice Dinnen as Margaret-Anne Baxter
- Margaret Christensen as Jo

== Plot ==
A widow runs a guest house.
