= Ken Hannam =

Australian film and television director (1929–2004)

- Born: 12 July 1929; Melbourne, Australia
- Died: 16 November 2004 (aged 75); London, England
- Occupations: Film and television director
- Years active: 1963–2001

Ken Hannam (12 July 1929 – 16 November 2004) was an Australian film and television director who also worked in British television drama.

== Career ==
Born in St Kilda, Melbourne, the eldest of three boys, Hannam lived in his youth in Sydney and was educated at Wollaroi College in Orange, New South Wales. He worked in Australian radio, theatre and television.

He started in radio when 15 years of age. He was an announcer at 2SM. He appeared in theatre as an actor, and appeared in the first Philip Street Revue.

In 1957 he took over the TV show Captain Fortune.

In 1963 he directed episodes of Adventure Unlimited.

In 1968 he moved to England. He worked in English television, and returned to direct Australian feature films.

=== Feature films ===
His first feature Sunday Too Far Away (1975) marked the emergence of an internationally recognised Australian film industry. He went on to direct Summerfield (1977) and other films. His 1979 film Dawn! was entered into the 11th Moscow International Film Festival.

In 1977 he said "I don't think I enjoy being a director in a way." The following year he did an interview where he criticised the state of Australian filmmaking and admitted "When I see a rough cut of a film I've done I'm usually suicidal." He called Australian television "glossy pap" and said "I think Australian actors generally are just full of superficial tricks."

Hannam died of cancer aged 75 on 16 November 2004 in London. He was survived by his three wives, two brothers, two children and three grandchildren.

== Personal life ==
He married his first wife Lena Melocco in 1958; their daughter Vicki was born in 1960. His second wife was Wendy Dickson, his art director on Break of Day, whom he married in 1968. They divorced in 1985. His third wife was actor Madlena Nevada; they married in 1990 and remained together until his death; they adopted a son, Christopher.

== Filmography ==
=== Feature films directed ===
- Sunday Too Far Away (1975)
- Break of Day (1976)
- Summerfield (1977)
- Dawn! (1979)
- The Mismatch (1979) (TV movie)

=== TV work ===
- Captain Fortune (1957)
- The Story of Peter Gray (1962)
- Trad Jazz (1962)
- Jonah (1962)
- Adventure Unlimited (1963)
- I Have Been Here Before (1964)
- Macbeth in Camera (1964)
- Split Level (1964)
- The Recruiting Officer (1965)
- Contrabandits
- Paul Temple (7 episodes, 1970–1971)
- Spy Trap (8 episodes, 1972)
- Moonbase 3 (3 episodes, 1973)
- Colditz (2 episodes, 1974)
- The Day of the Triffids (6 episodes, 1981)
- Robbery Under Arms (1985; co-directed with Donald Crombie)
- Lovejoy (3 episodes, 1986)
- Boon (2 episodes, 1987)
- Crossfire (TV drama) (1988) TV mini-series
- Hannay (2 episodes, 1989)
- Campion (2 episodes, 1990)
- The House of Eliott (2 episodes, 1992)
- Strathblair (6 episodes, 1992–1993)
- Soldier Soldier (3 episodes, 1995)
- Dangerfield (4 episodes, 1997–1998)
- The Bill (9 episodes, 2000–2001)

=== Theatre ===
- One Way Pendulum (1962) - actor
- The Dock Brief (1964) - AMP Theatre, Sydney - director
- The Sponge Room (1964) - AMP Theatre, Sydney - director
- Something Unspoken (1965) - AMP Theatre, Sydney - director
- A Scent of Flowers by James Saunders (1968) - Independent - director

== Notes ==
- Murray, Scott, ed. (1994). Australian Cinema. St.Leonards, NSW: Allen & Unwin/AFC. p. 324. ISBN 1-86373-311-6.
