= The Phantom Stockman =

1953 film by Lee Robinson

- Directed by: Lee Robinson
- Written by: Lee Robinson
- Produced by: George Heath; Chips Rafferty
- Starring: Victoria Shaw; Chips Rafferty; Max Osbiston; Guy Doleman
- Cinematography: George Heath
- Edited by: Gus Lowry
- Music by: William Lovelock
- Production company: Platypus Productions
- Distributed by: Universal Pictures (Australia); Astor Corporation (US); Renown (UK)
- Release dates: June 1953 (Australia); September 15, 1953 (United States)
- Running time: 67 minutes
- Countries: Australia; United States
- Language: English
- Budget: £10,800
- Box office: £23,000 (outside Australia)

The Phantom Stockman is a 1953 Australian Western film written and directed by Lee Robinson and starring Chips Rafferty, Victoria Shaw, Max Osbiston and Guy Doleman.

It was the first of several movies produced by Lee Robinson in association with Chips Rafferty in the 1950s.

== Plot summary ==
Kim Marsden inherits a cattle station near Alice Springs after the death of her father. Kim becomes convinced her father was murdered. She sends for a legendary local bushman called the Sundowner, who was one of her father's best friends.

Adopting the name Ted Simpson, the Sundowner arrives at Kim's station with his Aboriginal offsider, Dancer. They are given work by the station manager, McLeod.

The Sundowner and Dancer discover that cattle rustlers have been stealing stock. The realise the person behind the murder is Kim's neighbour, Stapleton, who is in league with the cattle rustlers and is romantically interested in Kim.

The rustlers kidnap Sundowner but he uses telepathy to get Dancer to come to his rescue. Kim is united with her true love, McLeod.

== Cast ==
- Chips Rafferty as The Sundowner
- Janette Elphick as Kim Marsden
- Max Osbiston as McLeod
- Guy Doleman as Stapleton
- Henry Murdoch as Dancer
- Bob Darken as Roxey
- Joe Scully as the Moth
- George Neil
- Albert Namitjira as himself

== Development ==
Chips Rafferty and Lee Robinson had both failed to raise finance for individual projects. Rafferty wanted to make a £120,000 13-part series and film, The Green Opal, about immigration problems. Robinson wanted to make a thriller, Saturday to Monday which later became The Siege of Pinchgut. Both were stymied by a government rule at the time which prohibited invent in non-essential industry over £10,000.

The two men knew each other because Robinson wrote scripts for Rafferty's radio show, Chips: the Story of Outback. Both were frustrated at the lack of film production in Australia. They decided to team up together and make a film that cost under £10,000, with Robinson directing and Rafferty starring. (Robinson had experienced directing documentaries and been an assistant on I Found Joe Barton.)

They were joined by cinematographer George Heath and formed Platypus Productions. Said Rafferty at the time:

We nutted it out this way. What's the good of imitating English and American pictures when we can get into places these foreign production units can't reach for sandflies and skeeters? We'll pick locations and backgrounds the world knows nothing about. We'll study them for dramatic values. But we're not buying stories. The stories will just come out of our heads and still leave enough wood to make chairs.

Robinson later elaborated:

We said, "Let's forget what the Australian public thinks about, what they might take to, because if you put an Australian tag on a film it was the worst possible thing you could do."... The thing was to try and go for different locales and different lines, new material but fairly standard in the international approach... It was something that Les Norman (the producer of Eureka Stockade) said to us. "If you are working in a known background like London or New York you can go for very different story lines, but if you are working in a new background that is unfamiliar to your audience you have to be a bit conventional in your story line because audiences find it difficult to accept a totally new background and a really new story line at the same time." So I think there was a bit of that inherent in all of those early films with Chips.

It was decided to make the film in the Northern Territory where Robinson had worked for a number of years. The movie would focus around Chips Rafferty, playing a version of the character he portrayed on radio.

The film was originally known as Dewarra, Platypus then The Tribesman.

=== Casting ===
Charles Tingwell was meant to play a role but was unable to fit it in his schedule and was replaced by Guy Doleman. Doleman and Max Osbiston were experienced Sydney radio actors.

Seventeen-year-old Jeanette Elphick, 1952 model of the year, was cast in the lead. Her voice would be entirely dubbed by June Salter.

== Shooting ==
It was shot around Alice Springs in the Northern Territory of Australia starting July 1952. Several days shooting were lost due to unexpected rain. Interiors – the girl's house – were shot in Sydney at a small studio in North Sydney owned by Mervyn Murphy.

Robinson later recalled:

My experience with actors was limited. Chips on the other hand had by now made quite a number of films and he was an impeccable technical actor.... There were people in the picture of course who had never made a picture before. There weren’t the opportunities here for them to do so. He helped them a good deal by walking through scenes with them on his own and getting things sorted out, timing their dialogue and so on. The other thing was that we were working in actual locations. We decided right from the beginning we would never, ever build sets. We were working to a large extent in situations that were fairly genuine. The Aboriginal involvement, the themes were genuine themes. I suppose, given my documentary background and the fact that you are on actual locations and in many cases using actual people, it was inevitable that that would come through.

The cameo of painter Albert Namatjira, who appeared as himself, may have been the first of an Australian artist in a feature film. Lee Robinson had previously made a documentary about Namitjira called Namatjira the Painter.

Robinson says that George Heath did not get along with Chips Rafferty or Robinson.

== Release ==
=== Critical ===
The Sun Herald wrote that:

The film was made in a hurry, and looks like it; and the editing of many scenes is ludicrously slow. Hopalong Cassidy could probably clean up a dozen mysteries in the time it takes Chips Rafferty to draw wisely upon a cigarette. The romance is developed clumsily by script and direction. There were some satisfactory punches on the jaw, and a little gunplay later on, but generally there is not enough action to make the "dead heart" come to life.

According to Filmink the movie wasn't "a great film":

It’s too slow, much of it feels like a filmed radio play, and Max Osbiston isn’t handsome enough to play the romantic lead. But there’s enough good stuff to get by – the photography and locations, Rafferty being Rafferty, Elphick being pretty, Guy Doleman as a villain, Henry Murdock as a sidekick, that random Namatjira cameo. The Rafferty-Robinson collaboration would eventually turn sour, but on the first movie, they pretty much did everything right, within their limitations of talent, time and money.

=== Box office ===
Rafferty and Robinson managed to sell the Pakistan, India, Burma and Ceylon rights for £1,000. While filming The Desert Rats in Hollywood, Rafferty sold the American rights for $35,000, then the English rights for £7,500. (The movie would later screen on US TV as Return of the Plainsman.)

Robinson later claimed that the film recouped its costs within three months of being filmed.

The film was distributed in Australia by Universal. The deal was done through Herc McIntyre who had supported a number of local films. Robinson says McIntyre gave the film a very advantageous financial deal.

=== Foreign release ===
In the United States it was released as Return of the Plainsman whilst the working title was The Sundowner. In Britain the film was known as Cattle Station or The Tribesman.

== Legacy ==
Heath left the team and tried to get up his own film, called, The Jackaroo, but was unsuccessful.

Elphick later went to Hollywood and enjoyed a successful career under the name "Victoria Shaw". Rafferty and Robinson went on to make several more movies together as producer.

== See also ==
- Cinema of Australia
