= Mike and Stefani =

- Directed by: Ron Maslyn Williams
- Written by: Ron Maslyn Williams; Roland Loewe (dialogue)
- Produced by: Stanley Hawes
- Starring: Mycola; Stefani
- Narrated by: Martin Royal; Josephine O'Neill
- Cinematography: Reginald G Pearse
- Edited by: Inman Hunter; R. Maslyn Williams; Brereton Porter
- Music by: Robert Hughes
- Production company: Film Division, Dept of the Interior for the Dept of Immigration
- Release dates: January 1952 (MIFF); October 1953
- Running time: 64 minutes
- Country: Australia
- Language: English
- Budget: £5,000

Mike and Stefani is a 1952 Australian drama film produced by the Film Division, News and Information Bureau of the Department of Interior for the Department of Immigration. Made to counter criticism of Australia's post-war immigration policy that it was too lax, it tells the true story of a Ukrainian refugee couple who move to Australia. The film is in the style of the Italian neorealism movement.

== Plot ==
When war breaks out, a young Ukrainian couple, Mike and Stefani, are taken away by the German invaders to separate labour camps. After the war, Stefani finds herself a displaced person. She is reunited with Mike at a refugee camp and they live there for two and a half years. In 1949, the camps are being shut down so Mike and Stefani decide to migrate to Australia. However, they first have to undertake a gruelling medical examination and interrogation by Australian immigration officers.

== Cast ==
- Mycola – himself
- Stefani – herself
- Ladu (Mycola's brother)
- Valerie Paling – herself
- Australian immigration official – Harold Grant

== Production ==
Ron Maslyn Williams was sent to Europe in June 1949 accompanied by documentary cameraman Reginald Pearse. They spent several months researching and developing a script. They discovered a displaced persons camp for Polish and Ukrainian refugees at Leipheim in Bavaria, which was run by a former Melbourne school teacher, Valerie Paling. A family was selected and a script developed based on their lives. Scenes were shot for the beginning of the film to recreate their life in pre-war Ukraine and documentary clips were added to provide background to the couple's separation and forced labour in Germany.

Shooting took place over two months in the winter of 1949–50. The interview of Mike and Stefani by Australian Immigration official Harold Grant was real, with the family actually not yet assured of acceptance into Australia. However they were successful and the crew followed them to Australia. Additional shots were taken at the Film Division headquarters at Burwood, New South Wales.

== Release ==
Williams struggled to get the film commercially released. It was mainly distributed through government film libraries although it did have a few commercial screenings and won a prize at a festival.

In 2011, the film was released as a DVD from as part of the Film Australia Collection at the National Film and Sound Archive of Australia.
