= The Winds of Green Monday =

- Wednesday Theatre episode
- Episode no.: Season 1 Episode 30
- Directed by: Oscar Whitbread
- Teleplay by: Michael Noonan
- Original air date: 4 August 1965
- Running time: 45 mins

Episode chronology
← Previous "The Sweet Sad Story of Elmo and Me"	Next → "Ever Since Paradise"

"The Winds of Green Monday" is a 1965 Australian television play by Michael Noonan. It aired as part of Wednesday Theatre on 4 August 1965 in Sydney and Melbourne, and on 1 September 1965 in Brisbane. It starred Terry Norris and was directed by Oscar Whitbread.

== Plot ==
A crew deserts a ship to find their fortune in the 1850s goldfields. After three weeks of digging and nothing to show for it, the crew get restless despite the efforts of Welshman Jones. The ship's captain turns up at their shanty and tries to exercise his authority. Only the tragic accident which causes a young apprentice to lose his mind prevents the crew from returning to the ship. The captain forms a relationship with a singer.

== Cast ==
- Keith Lee as Scottish captain McKendrick
- Terry Norris as Mate Roberts
- Jennifer Wright as music hall singer Martha
- Martin Magee as the young apprentice
- George Whaley as Welshman Jones
- Stanley Walsk as a Cockney seaman
- Roly Barie
- Nevil Thurgood
- Tony McGrath

== Production ==
It was one of 20 TV plays produced by the ABC in 1964 (and one of only three Australian scripts). It was filmed in Melbourne. Jennifer Wright and Stanley Walsh had just arrived in Australia from England and made their Australian TV debuts.

== Reception ==
The Sydney Morning Herald praised the performances of Lee and Wright as "professional" but complained about the "stiffness of the dialogue" and said "the direction of the crowds with their rhubarb-rhubarb voices and their tinned and infuriatingly phony laughter drove us for solace across the dial."

== British version ==
The play was adapted for British TV in 1965 starring Chips Rafferty.
