= The Battlers (TV series) =

1968 Australian television series

- Newspaper ad from 26 Jun 1968
- Written by: John Abbott; Edward Hepple; Jonh Kiddell; Michael Wright
- Directed by: Jacques d Vigne
- Starring: John Armstrong; Bill Hunter; Mark McManus; Carmen Duncan; Vincent Gil
- Country of origin: Australia
- Original language: English
- No. of episodes: 26

Production
- Producer: John Walters
- Running time: 30 mins

Original release
- Release: 26 June – 24 December 1968

The Battlers is a 1968 Australian television series about an aboriginal boxer. It was inspired by the story of Lionel Rose.

== Plot ==
Tolly McCall is the lightweight boxing champion of Australia whose career is threatened with injury. His wife Janet is relieved that he will no longer box. Tolly becomes obsessed with a young aboriginal boxer, Wayne.

== Cast ==
=== Main / regular ===
- Mark McManus as Tolly McCall
- Carmen Duncan as Janet McCall
- Vincent Gil as Wayne Small
- Janice Dinnen as Donna McCall
- Gordon Glenwright as Tolly's manager, Bongo Byrne
- John Armstrong as Tolly's trainer, Monk

=== Guests ===
- Bill Hunter as Man in second hotel bar
- John Unicomb
- Jonathan Sweet as Bambi
- Les Foxcroft as Man in second hotel bar
- Lucky Grills
- Nigel Lovell as Magistrate
- Roger Ward as Police Prosecutor

== Production ==
It followed the production of You Can't See 'Round Corners and employed the same producer with a number of actors being carried over. The serial was originally known as The Doongara Kid. The story was inspired by Lionel Rose. Vincent Gil was trained in boxing for the serial by Bill McConnell.

It was shot at ATN-7's "E-Cam" studio in Epping, Sydney and on location at Le Perouse, the stadium, and travelling tent shows around the countryside.

== Selected episodes ==
- Episode 1: 26 June (Sydney), 9 July (Melbourne) – Tolly is told he cannot fight again. He goes to the country to think things over. While there he discovers his Aboriginal partner on a log cutting job is an excellent fighter. Tolly decides to train him.
- Episode 2: 3 July (Sydney), 16 July (Melbourne) – written by John Kiddle and Edward Hepple – Tolly and his wife disagree on their future plans and all depends on Wayne's first fight.
- Episode 3: 10 July (Sydney), 23 July (Melbourne) – in an effort to get Tolly back to Sydney, Janet offers to help two of his friends set up a gym.
- Episode 4: 17 July (Sydney), 30 July (Melbourne) – Bondo and Monk have found a gym and start negotiations. When Tolly and Wayne arrive in a small bush town to fight the local championship they land in trouble due to the attitude of local citizens toward Aboriginals.
- Episode 5: 24 July (Sydney), 5 August (Melbourne) – Wayne and Tolly are tried in the magistrate's court for assault and fined accordingly. Tolly's younger sister sets out to make an issue of Wayne's imprisonment.
- Episode 6: 31 July (Sydney), 12 August (Melbourne) – Janet heads for the country town where Tolly is imprisoned in an attempt to heal the breach between them. Tolly's wife Janet arrives but she will not pay the fine.
- Episode 7: 7 August (Sydney), 19 August (Melbourne) – things get better between Janet and Tolly until he discovers she is working for her old lover, Halliday. Wayne starts training but disappears after overhearing a fight between Janet and Tolly.
- Episode 8: 14 August (Sydney), 26 August (Melbourne) – the day of Wayne's first fight arrives and he is missing, distraught over the trouble he thinks he has caused between Janet and Tolly.
- Episode 9: 21 August (Sydney), 2 September (Melbourne) – Janet is still missing and Tolly is convinced she has left with Halliday. Wayne hopes Tollly will change his mind about managing him and rejects Bongo's offer.
- Episode 10: 28 August (Sydney), 9 September (Melbourne) – Tolly visits the doctor and finds out the fractures in his head will never heal.
- Episode 11: 4 September (Sydney) 16 September (Melbourne) – Tolly gets a job as a chauffeur, meets an attractive woman who recognises him and they become involved. Tolly goes to Paula Bradley's flat for dinner.
- Episode 12: 11 September (Sydney), 23 September (Melbourne) – Wayne hopes that Tolly will change his mind about managing him and refuses Bongo's offer of management.
- Episode 13: 18 September (Sydney) 30 September (Melbourne) – Wayne gets his first bout at the South Sydney Leagues Club. Tolly and Janet discuss matrimonial problems. Janet starts divorce proceedings.
- Episode 14: 25 September (Sydney), 7 October (Melbourne) – Wayne hits the big time and starts earning a lot of money. Donna goes to work for the Herald and has to do a story on an English racing driver.
- Episode 15: 1 October (Sydney), 14 October (Melbourne).
- Episode 16: 8 October (Sydney), 21 October (Melbourne).
- Episode 17: 15 October (Sydney), 28 October (Melbourne).
- Episode 18: 23 October (Sydney), 4 November (Melbourne).
- Episode 19: 5 November (Sydney), 11 November (Melbourne) – Monk's involvement with shady characters leads to unexpected developments.
- Episode 20: 12 November (Sydney), 18 November (Melbourne).
- Episode 21: 19 November (Sydney), 25 November (Melbourne) – Bongo and Tolly sign up a new lightweight from Melbourne.
- Episode 22: 26 November (Sydney), 2 December (Melbourne) – Wayne starts going back into boxing by doing easy fights.
- Episode 23: 3 December (Sydney), 9 December (Melbourne), written by John Abbott – Tolly is conned into a fashion parade and Wayne is conned back into gym work.
- Episode 24: 10 December (Sydney), 16 December (Melbourne).
- Ep 25: 17 December (Sydney), 23 December (Melbourne).
- Episode 26: 24 December (Sydney), 30 December, January (Melbourne), final episode – Wayne vanishes after winning the Australian title.

== Reception ==
Reviewing the pilot episode The Age praised it as "exciting, sustaining, action viewing".

The Sydney Morning Herald felt the second episode "felt tired" and that the writers "were not at home with women".

In July the Sydney Morning Herald called it "television drama less derivative than any Australian series so far" but said Gill "is given little to articulate about being aboriginal. To begin with, he looks white and in the hands of white writers his characterisation is robbed of perception."

In December the Sydney Morning Herald said "the show has not delivered a knock out" blaming poor writing.
