= The Dawn Fraser Story =

- Directed by: Joy Cavill; Lee Robinson
- Written by: Joy Cavill
- Starring: Dawn Fraser
- Production company: Waratah Film Productions
- Distributed by: TCN 9
- Release date: 14 December 1964
- Running time: 54 minutes
- Country: Australia
- Language: English

The Dawn Fraser Story is a 1964 documentary film about the Australian swimmer Dawn Fraser. It was made by Joy Cavill, who later made a feature film about Fraser, Dawn! (1979), and had a romantic relationship with her. It is one of the few Australian documentary films of the time to be directed by a woman. It was made by the short lived Waratah Film Productions.

Filming began in August 1964.

While filming at the 1964 Tokyo Olympics, Cavill suffered a heart attack.
