= Leonard Teale =

Australian actor (1922–1994)

Leonard Teale AO
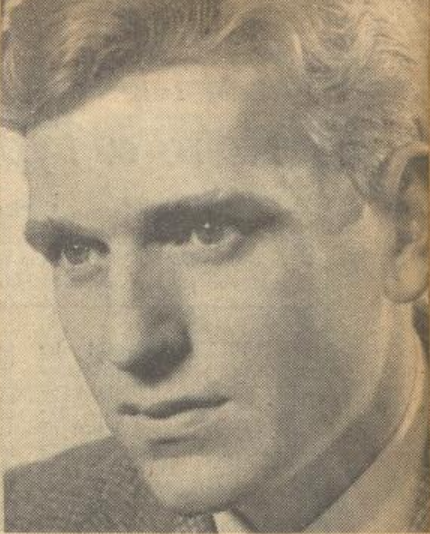
- Teale in 1954
- Born: Leonard George Thiele; 26 September 1922; Brisbane, Queensland, Australia
- Died: 14 May 1994 (aged 71); Sydney, New South Wales, Australia
- Education: Brisbane Grammar School
- Occupations: Actor; radio announcer; TV presente; narrator
- Years active: 1939–1986
- Spouse: Liz Harris (m. 1968)
- Children: 4

Leonard George Thiele AO (26 September 1922 – 14 May 1994), professionally Leonard Teale, was an Australian actor of radio, television and film and radio announcer, presenter and narrator known for his resonant baritone voice. He is best remembered for his role in the long-running Australian police procedural drama Homicide as David "Mac" MacKay.

As a professional actor he adopted Teale – a homophone of his birth surname, Thiele – as a stage name.

== Biography ==
=== Early life and military service ===
Leonard George Thiele was born in Brisbane, Queensland, to Maude Henrietta Thiele, née Rasmussen, and Herman Albert Thiele, a chemist. He attended Milton State Primary School and Brisbane Grammar School (1934–38) on a scholarship. However, the family's financial situation during the Great Depression forced Leonard to leave school and enter the workforce. He worked as a junior clerk for Brisbane City Council's Electricity Supply Department. In his spare time, he took up amateur drama, with local repertory groups. From the age of 17, he augmented these activities with a role as a part-time radio announcer, after successfully auditioning at the Australian Broadcasting Commission (ABC) in Brisbane.

Following the outbreak of World War II, Thiele joined the Militia and served as a signaller. Interested in becoming a pilot, he transferred to the Royal Australian Air Force (RAAF) on 10 October 1942. He graduated from flying school the following year and was commissioned as officer. In 1944, Thiele was posted to the Mediterranean theatre, where he served with No. 458 Squadron RAAF, a maritime patrol/strike unit, flying Vickers Wellingtons, from bases at Foggia, Italy, and Gibraltar. He was promoted to Flight Lieutenant in September 1945 and was discharged on 16 January 1946, after returning to Australia.

== Career ==
=== Radio serials ===
Thiele's career as a professional actor commenced in the late 1940s and early 1950s, in radio serials; his roles included that of Superman/Clark Kent and Tarzan.

Thiele was a co-compère of the radio ABC Children's Session, as "Chris" from 1951 to 1954 (also playing the title role in its Muddle-Headed Wombat serial), his involvement possibly cut short by management for political reasons. At this time he was still using the surname "Thiele" professionally.

He also made regular appearances in radio variety programs such as the Bonnington's Bunkhouse Show, and voiceovers in countless commercials.

=== PACT ===
His talent was nurtured and developed at the Producers Authors Composers and Talent Centre, which was founded in 1964.

=== Films ===
He appeared in several feature films, including Smiley, Smiley Gets a Gun and Bungala Boys.

In the early 1950s, with Raymond Hanson, Roland Robinson and others, Thiele helped form the short-lived Australian Cultural Defence Movement, aimed at protecting local arts and crafts production from the perceived inroads being made by imported content, particularly from the US. However, the movement faltered after becoming a target of anti-communist activists, (His brother, Neville Thiele, was also targeted, for participating in left-wing theatre.)

=== TV presenter and actor ===
Major television roles included a regular comedic role in the Mobil-Limb Show, host roles in variety programs Singalong and Folkmoot, and acting roles in locally produced drama series including Whiplash, The Hungry Ones, Adventure Unlimited , Split Level and Consider Your Verdict. He is best remembered, however, for his long-running role as Senior Detective (later Detective Sergeant) David "Mac" Mackay in Homicide from 1965 to 1973. Homicide was Australia's first-ever locally produced TV police drama. Teale won a Logie for best Australian actor in 1974. He also hosted a documentary about the series, The Homicide Story, in 1970. Other leading television roles included Captain Woolcott in Seven Little Australians (1973), and headmaster Charles Ogilvy in school-based soap opera Class of '74 (1974–75).

=== Narrator ===
Teale narrated for ABC audio recordings, including the Banjo Paterson poem The Man from Snowy River, and a spoken-word version of the Led Zeppelin song "Stairway to Heaven" on ABC-TV's The Money or the Gun. His reading of Dorothea Mackellar's poem "My Country", which included the lines "I love a sunburnt country, a land of sweeping plains" was so widely played in Australia during the 1970s that it was also frequently parodied.

== Awards & honours ==
Year	Title	Award	Category	Result
1974	Homicide	Logie Award	Best Australian Actor	Won
1992	Leonard Teale	Queen's New Years Honours List – Officer of the Order of Australia (AO)	Services to the Performing Arts & Community	Honoured

== Personal life ==
Married three times, Leonard Teale had four children, Amanda, Juli, Jennifer and Melinda. He married his third wife, entertainer Liz Harris in 1968; Harris had appeared in three episodes of Homicide.

Leonard Teale died of a heart attack in 1994. A documentary, Homicide: 30 Years On, aired later that year which included reminiscences from former Homicide castmates and footage of an appearance made by himself and Homicide actors George Mallaby and Alwyn Kurts in 1992 presenting a Logie Award for Most Outstanding Series partially in character (with hilarious results).

== Filmography ==
=== Film ===
Year	Title	Role	Notes
1949	Eureka Stockade		Feature film
1955	Call for Order		
1956	Smiley	Ernie	Feature film (segment: The Load of Wood)
1958	Smiley Gets a Gun	Mr. Stevens	Feature film
1960	The Sundowners	Shearer #2	Feature film
1961	Bungala Boys	Sam Taylor	Feature film
1961	In Writing	Detective Inspector Hurst	TV play
1961	The Merchant of Venice	Prince of Morocco	TV play
1962	Lend Me Your Stable		
1964	The One That Got Away	Major Arthur Dawson	Feature film
1966	They're a Weird Mob	Building Inspector (uncredited)	Feature film
1976	The Bushranger		Feature film
1981	Maybe This Time	The Minister	Feature film
1983	The Body Corporate	Sir Arthur Tustrain	TV movie
1984	Stanley	1st Detective	Feature film

=== Television ===
Year	Title	Role	Notes
1951–54	Muddle-Headed Wombat	Chris	TV series
1960	Whiplash		TV series
1961	Telestory	Narrator	TV series (narrating the novel Sundowners)
1961–64	Consider Your Verdict		TV series
1961–64	Mobil Limb Show	Regular comedic role	TV series
1963	The Hungry Ones	Will Bryant	TV miniseries
1965	Adventure Unlimited	Don Williams	TV series, Episode 6: The Buffalo Hunters
1965–73	Homicide	Senior Detective (later Detective Sergeant) David "Mac" Mackay	TV series, 357 episodes (won a Logie for Best Australian Actor)
1970	The Homicide Story	Host	TV documentary (about Homicide)
1973	Seven Little Australians	Captain John Woolcot	TV series
1974–75	Class of '74	Charles Ogilvy	TV series
1976	The Outsiders	Steve	TV series
1985	Professor Poopsnagle's Steam Zeppelin	Used-to-Was	TV series, 4 episodes
1989/90	The Money or the Gun	Narrator	TV series (spoken-word version of the Led Zeppelin song "Stairway to Heaven")
	Singalong	Host	TV series
	Folkmoot	Host	TV series
1994	Homicide: 30 Years On	Himself as David "Mac" Mackay	TV documentary about Homicide (posthumously via archive footage)

== Radio ==
Year	Title	Role	Notes
1948	Hagen’s Circus	Jim Cameron || Radio 2UE serial	
1949–1954	The Adventures of Superman	Superman	Radio 2GB, Sydney serial, 1,040 episodes
1950	Portrait of Jennie		Radio 2UW, Sydney, Radio 3DB, Melbourne
1951	The Muddle-Headed Wombat	Joe	ABC Radio serial
1951–1954	ABC The Children’s Session	Co-compère Argonaut ‘Chris'	ABC Radio serial
1952	Portia Faces Life	Christopher	Radio 3UZ, Melbourne serial with Grace Gibson Radio Productions
1952	The Pathway of the Sun	Simon Challinor	Radio serial with Grace Gibson Radio Productions
1952	Behind the Footlights		Radio serial with George Edwards Productions
1952–1954	Bonnington’s Bunkhouse Show		Radio serial with Grace Gibson Radio Productions
1953	Book Club of the Air		Radio 2TM serial with Grace Gibson Radio Productions
1955	Nestle's Show		Radio 2KO with Macquarie Broadcasting Service
1955–1956	Harry Dearth's Playhouse		Radio 2GB, Sydney & Radio 2UW, Sydney serial
1959	The Guiding Light	Fred Baum	Radio 2UW, Sydney serial with Grace Gibson Radio Productions
Late 1950s	We Love and Learn	Robert	Radio 2GB, Sydney serial

== Theatre ==
Year	Title	Role	Notes
1939	The Invisible Duke / The Bride / Paradise Now		Empire Chambers, Brisbane with Dulcie Scott Players
1940	Family Affairs		Student Theatre, Brisbane with Dulcie Scott Players
1940	George and Margaret		Princess Theatre, Woolloongabba with Brisbane Repertory Theatre Society
1947	French Without Tears		Sydney Radio Theatre & Killara Soldiers Memorial Hall, Sydney with Mercury Theatres
1947	The Water Babies		Theatre Royal Sydney with J. C. Williamson
1949	The Bushranger	Sergeant Blogg	Mosman Town Hall, Sydney with Mosman Children's Theatre
1949	The Tempest		Independent Theatre, Sydney
1949	The Winter’s Tale		Independent Theatre, Sydney
1950	S.S Glencairn		Independent Theatre, Sydney
1950	In the Zone		Independent Theatre, Sydney
1950	Moon of the Caribees		Independent Theatre, Sydney
1950	The Long Voyage Home		Independent Theatre, Sydney
1950	Bound East for Cardiff		Independent Theatre, Sydney
1950	The Merchant of Venice		Independent Theatre, Sydney
1950	Home of the Brave		Independent Theatre, Sydney
1950	The Pied Piper of Hamelin		Theatre Royal Sydney with J. C. Williamson
1951	The Miser		Independent Theatre, Sydney
1952	A Sleep of Prisoners		Garrison Church, Sydney
1956	The Rivals	Faulkland	Comedy Theatre, Melbourne, Elizabethan Theatre, Sydney, Playhouse, Perth with J. C. Williamson
1956	Twelfth Night	Orsino	Elizabethan Theatre, Sydney, Comedy Theatre, Melbourne, Playhouse, Perth
1957	Macbeth	Macbeth	Independent Theatre, Sydney
1960	Inherit the Wind		Independent Theatre, Sydney
1960	Hunger of a Girl		Independent Theatre, Sydney
1963	Twenties Spectacular	Compère	Independent Theatre, Sydney
1963	The Fire on the Snow		Independent Theatre, Sydney
1964	The Man from Snowy River		AMP Theatrette, Sydney with Q Theatre Company
1964	The Caucasian Chalk Circle		UNSW with Old Tote Theatre Company
1964	J.B.	J.B.	Independent Theatre, Sydney
1965	Two Plays in Rehearsal		Independent Theatre, Sydney
1965	Down in the Valley / Leonard Teale & Andy Sundstrom	Guitarist	UNSW Old Tote Theatre with NIDA
1965	The Fire on the Snow (in rehearsal)		Independent Theatre, Sydney
1975	Down Under		Stables Theatre, Sydney with The King O'Malley Theatre Company
1977–1980	While the Billy Boils	Henry Lawson	Australian tour
1981	The Gin Game	Weller Martin	Queensland tour
1982	Einstein	Albert Einstein	SGIO Theatre, Brisbane with QTC
1983; 1984; 1985	84, Charing Cross Road	Frank	Marian Street Theatre, Sydney, Hoyts Prince Theatre, Hobart, Princess Theatre, Launceston, Civic Theatre, Burnie
1983	In Duty Bound		Marian Street Theatre, Sydney
1984; 1985	The Quiet Achievers	Reader	Marian Street Theatre, Sydney, Playhouse, Canberra with Northside Theatre Company for Sydney Festival
1988	The Men Who Made Australia	Reader	Parramatta Cultural Centre

== Discography ==
- Leonard Teale The Man From Snowy River - Leonard Teale Reading Bush Ballads By A. B. (Banjo) Paterson LP, CBS 1956
- Leonard Thiele Henry Lawson Spoken By Leonard Thiele - When Your Pants Begin To Go LP, Festival Records 1957
- Bruce Finlay, Leonard Teale & Jim Gussey Seven Cities Suite LP, His Master's Voice 1960
- Leonard Teale & Andy Sundstrom Songs Of The Sundowners LP, CBS 1964
- Leonard Teale & Andy Sundstrom Travelling Down The Castlereagh LP, CBS 1965
- Leonard Teale Henry Lawson Spoken By Leonard Teale - His Life Story In His Own Verse LP, CBS 1965
- Leonard Teale The Australiana Collection - Australian Verse Read By Leonard Teale LP, CBS 1980
- Leonard Teale My Country - Traditional Australian Verse LP, CBS 1988
- Leonard Teale Henry Lawson's Australia CD, CBS 1988
- Leonard Teale: Leonard Teale's Australia CD, Sony Australia 1994
- Peter Sullivan, Frank Strangio, Noel Watson & Leonard Teale Banjo Paterson's The Man From Snowy River CD, PolyGram 1995
- Leonard Teale: Famous Australian Poems 2011*Leonard Teale My Country (Australian Verse Selected And Read By Leonard Teale) LP, Pacific
- Leonard Teale Henry Lawson's Australia Spoken By Leonard Teale LP, CBS
- Leonard Teale, Chips Rafferty, Kevin Brennan, Tex Morton and The Bush Music Club Songs & Poems Of Australia: Henry Lawson, John O'Brien, Adam Lindsay Gordon, C. J. Dennis LP, Festival Custom Recording
