= Bungala Boys =

- Film poster
- Directed by: Jim Jeffrey
- Written by: Jim Jeffrey
- Based on: novel The New Surf Club by Claire Meillon
- Produced by: Otto Plaschkes
- Starring: Peter Couldwell
- Cinematography: Carl Kayser
- Edited by: Terry Trench
- Music by: Edwin Astley
- Production companies: Jimar Productions; Children's Film Foundation
- Release dates: December 1961 (United Kingdom); 24 April 1964 (Australia)
- Running time: 61 minutes
- Countries: Australia; United Kingdom
- Language: English

Bungala Boys is a 1961 children's film directed and written by Jim Jeffrey. It was the second Australian based film made by the Children's Film Foundation, following Bush Christmas and was the first non-documentary film to focus on surf clubs.

== Plot ==
Brian is a newcomer to Bungala Beach, near Sydney. He forms a new Surf Life Saving Club which wins first prize in a surf boat race.

== Cast ==
- Peter Couldwell as Tony Wakeford
- Alan Dearth as Brian Wakeford
- Terry Bentley as Normie
- Julie Youatt as Nancy Phelan
- Ross Vidal as Timmy
- Geoffrey Parsons as Buzz
- Jon Dennis as Hatch
- Max Osbiston as Reg Phelan
- Leonard Teale as Sam Taylor
- John Sherwood
- Janice Dinnen as Sylvia
- Dennis Carroll as Lyall
- David Broad as Douglas
- Peter Goslett as Barney
- David Sumpter
- Margaret Roberts
- Jack Amistead
- Betty Dyson

== Production ==
The film was based on Claire Meillon's children's novel The New Surf Club (1959). Meillon was formerly assistant fiction editor of The Australian Women's Weekly. The book was based on her brother's founding of Newport Surf Club, on Sydney's Northern Beaches. The name "Bungala" is a combination of "Bilgola" and "Bungan", which are also northern beaches of Sydney, and located near Newport Beach.

Jimar Productions made the film at the request of the Children's Film Foundation.

The film was shot on location at Bungan Beach and at Artransa Studios in Sydney in April–May 1961. Many of the child stars had never acted before.

The actors were given brief training in surf lifesaving.

== Release ==
The film was released in the United Kingdom, Canada and Europe before Australia.
