= New Guinea Patrol =

1958 documentary film

New Guinea Patrol is a 1958 Australian documentary film produced by R. Maslyn Williams.

The film is regarded as a classic.
