= Rock 'n' Roll (1959 film) =

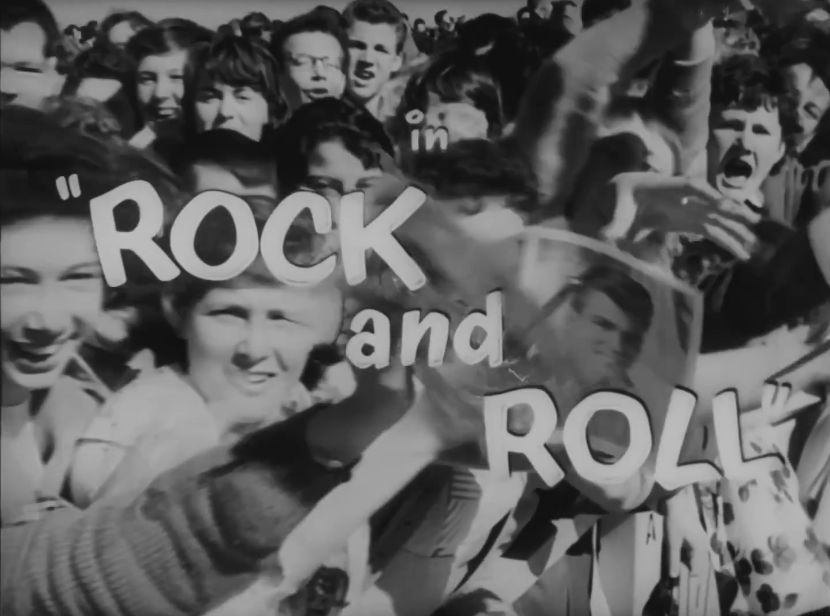
- Title card from opening credits
- Directed by: Lee Robinson
- Produced by: Lee Gordon
- Starring: Johnny O'Keefe
- Production company: Southern International
- Distributed by: Lee Gordon (Australia); Kerridge Organisation (New Zealand)
- Release date: 30 October 1959
- Running time: 78 minutes
- Country: Australia
- Language: English

Rock 'n' Roll is a 1959 Australian rock and roll concert film filmed at Sydney Stadium during the Lee Gordon's Rock 'n' Roll Spectacular shows, directed by Lee Robinson. Performers include Johnny O'Keefe, The Delltones, The Devils and Johnny Devlin. All acts are from either Australia or New Zealand. American singer Fabian's performance was also shot, but this was cut from the Australian version of the film as the producers did not wish to pay the fee his management requested. They did, however, discreetly keep the Fabian sequence intact in some versions of the film that were sent to New Zealand.

The film is the only full-length rock'n'roll concert film from the 1950s shot anywhere in the world. It was considered lost for decades until March 2020, when a print of the Australian version (sans Fabian) was discovered by Mark Iaria in a suitcase on a nature strip in the suburbs of Melbourne. The print was eventually restored to excellent condition, digitised and screened around Australia from 2021, then uploaded to YouTube in 2024. Rock 'n' Roll is in the public domain, having fallen out of copyright in the 2010s.

== Featured acts ==
The full film.

In order of appearance:

Order	Main performer	Supporting act	Songs
1	The Rebels (without Johnny Rebb)	none	"In a Persian Market" (instrumental)
2	The Delltones	The Rebels	"Gee"; "Why"
3	The Crescents	The Devils	"Mr. Blue"; "Why Do Fools Fall in Love"
4	Warren Williams	The Joy Boys	"Tallahassee Lassie"; "My Teenage Love"
5	The Graduates	none	"Till My Baby Comes Home"; "Little Darlin"
6	Lonnie Lee	The Devils	"Let's Have a Party"; "Lover Doll"
7	The Rebels	none	"Bluebirds Over the Mountain"; "Say Yeah"
8	The Rebels	The Delltones	"We Belong Together"; "Pathway to Paradise"
9	Johnny Devlin	The Devils	"Whole Lotta Shakin' Goin' On"; "Gotta Be True"; "Hippy Hippy Shake"; "Trouble"
10	Col Joye	The Joy Boys	"Mona Lisa"; "Living Doll"; "Rocky Road Blues"; "Oh Yeah, Uh Huh"; "Rockin Rollin Clementine"
11	Johnny O'Keefe	The Dee Jays	"You Excite Me"
12	Johnny O'Keefe	The Dee Jays The Delltones	"Over the Mountain"; "Swanee River"; "Just a Closer Walk with Thee"; "Shout"; "What'd I Say"
unknown	Fabian	The Graduates	unknown

== Production ==
Ad from the Sydney Morning Herald, 16 October 1959.

Filming took place over four concerts at The Sydney Stadium on 15 and 16 October 1959. The performances, filmed on a revolving stage, and the audience reactions were shot using seven cameras. Directed by Lee Robinson, cameramen included Johnny Leake, Keith Loon, Bill Grimmo Bobby Wright, and Ron Horner. It was produced at Southern International Studios. There were only three negatives of the film produced - one kept by Robinson, while the other was distributed under contract to New Zealand.

== Release ==
The first showing of Rock 'n' Roll was in Newcastle, NSW on 30 October 1959 followed by a show at North Sydney's Orpheum Theatre on 31 October (both of which included Fabian). It also played at the Capitol Theatre in Sydney in December 1959. Its Melbourne premiere was at Loco Cinestar Theatre on 11 January 1960 but by mid-1960 it was no longer being shown in either city. It did appear sporadically after that in the 1960s, including at a drive-in.

The movie did receive a reasonably wide release in New Zealand through the Kerridge Organisation who paid £3,000 for the screening rights. It premiered on 10 December in Auckland then across the country. Apart from this stint in New Zealand, it was not shown in any other country.

According to the official website of the film, Fabian appeared in the original cuts of the movie but was quickly removed and replaced by O'Keefe in the Australian version (due to objections by his manager, Bob Marcucci, given that no separate film rights had been negotiated). In the rescued film's current state, Fabian's cut section (apart from his singing) remains unclear, though it may have included an interview and images of his dramatic arrival at Essendon airport, where he was mobbed by 2,000 teenagers and had to be taken away on a forklift.

In December 1959, Johnny Devlin was granted an injunction preventing the exhibition of the film by Greater Union theatres. Devlin claimed that the film grossly defamed him. However, after Gordon agreed not to release any more Devlin recordings without Devlin's permission, the injunction was dismissed. Robinson also stated that the film's release was hurt by Gordon (who lost interest in the project after the removal of Fabian) and would not let distributors have the film under normal contractual terms.

Poster from The Press 30 Dec 1959

== Reception ==
Rock 'n' Roll is regarded as a unique and priceless piece of Australiana and Rock 'n' Roll history. Having been filmed by arguably Australia's most important pioneering director, it is also, just as importantly, a treasured record of Australia's cinematic past. The film's worth is also enhanced by the fact that the sound and camera technology used for its filming was ahead of its time, capturing the essence of the Australian/International Rock 'n' Roll scene in the 1950s like no other. It also reveals a euphoric female Beatlemania-stye reaction largely unseen in other films at that time.

Stephen Vagg, reviewing the film for Filmink said he "had a great time" watching it. "The fact that it was shot on 35mm film, meant that it has aged very well and it is a fascinating glimpse of a time now passed...The cinema had a healthy amount of boomers in the audience, which added to the enjoyment – they would excitedly whisper to each other during the film going “I remember that singer”, and sing along to some of the tunes." Lonnie Lee remembers singing on the show. Just prior to the show, Devlin's NZ band The Devils left him and joined Lee as The Leemen so Lonnie's previous Leemen became Johnny's Devils.

== Loss and rediscovery ==
Robinson would periodically licence the surviving amount of film to other filmmakers. Robinson, however, later lost his film copy due to removalists accidentally disposing of it. Besides small sections of the film with no audio attached, the O'Keefe performance of "Shout" was thought to be the only surviving piece of the films footage until recently. This performance in the film has been used in the opening credits of ABC Australia's music show Rage since 1987.

In March 2020, more than 60 years since its premiere, the film was rediscovered in Melbourne by Mark laria. He found it in a dusty old suitcase that he saw on a hard rubbish day "on the nature strip of a yard sale", a day before it was going to be disposed of. It was reported to be in excellent condition for its age, with the image quality far surpassing any existing footage of this era. This was in no small part due to the equipment used for the filming, and that the film was shot on 35mm safety film. With the film out of copyright, Iaria decided to restore and digitise the film himself rather than simply donate it, for example, to the National Film and Sound Archive.

Until 2020, Rock 'n' Roll was classified as a lost film by the NFSA and rested in their 'most wanted' list for a number of years. Its discovery is arguably the most important Australian cultural artefact recovered in the last 50 years, due in no small part to the fact that Rock 'n' Roll was the only 35mm feature-length film of a live rock 'n' roll concert ever made in the 1950s. Moreover, it is arguably the only piece of 35mm rock 'n' roll live footage from the 1950s in existence, since the 1955 film The Pied Piper of Cleveland (the only other 35mm live film shot in this decade) is considered to be lost by many researchers.

== Re-release ==
O'Keefe performing at the Sydney Stadium while being filmed for Rock 'n' Roll

The restored film screened at ACMI, Melbourne for the first time in over 50 years on 6 December 2021, then in a restored state for the first time at Dendy Cinemas Newtown Sydney on 22 May 2023. The screening included three performers of the film in attendance, including Col Joye, Lonnie Lee and Tony Brady - alongside surviving members of the audience.

In early 2021, a short clip from the documentary was posted onto YouTube, featuring O'Keefe performing "Swanee River". Other performances were released individually on the official YouTube channel, including some that were colourised. On 6 April 2024, the entire film was uploaded to the Rock'n'Roll (1959) website.
