= Smiley Gets a Gun =

Smiley
- Directed by: Anthony Kimmins
- Written by: Anthony Kimmins; Rex Rienits
- Based on: novel by Moore Raymond
- Produced by: Anthony Kimmins
- Starring: Sybil Thorndike; Chips Rafferty
- Cinematography: Edward Scaife
- Edited by: G. Turney-Smith
- Music by: Wilbur Sampson
- Color process: Color by DeLuxe
- Production company: Canberra Films
- Distributed by: Twentieth Century Fox
- Release dates: May 1958 (London); December 1958 (Australia); 15 April 1959 (Fargo)
- Running time: 90 minutes
- Country: Australia
- Language: English

Smiley Gets a Gun is a 1958 Australian comedy-drama film in CinemaScope directed by Anthony Kimmins and starring Sybil Thorndike and Chips Rafferty. It is the sequel to the 1956 film Smiley.

== Synopsis ==
A young boy named Smiley desperately wants a gun. A deal is made between him and Sergeant Flaxman that if he gets 8 nicks (marks on a certain tree) for his good deeds he will get a .22 calibre rifle, valued at £2. He has several adventures and is accused of stealing some gold. Smiley runs away but the real thief is caught and Smiley is rewarded with a gun.

== Cast ==
- Keith Calvert as Smiley Greevins
  - Alexander ( Bruce) Thomas as Smiley Greevins on horse
- Bruce Archer as Joey
- Sybil Thorndike as Granny McKinley
- Chips Rafferty as Sergeant Flaxman
- Margaret Christensen as Ma Greevins
- Reg Lye as Pa Greevins
- Grant Taylor as Stiffy
- Guy Doleman as Mr Quirk
- Leonard Thiele as Mr Scrivens
- Verena Kimmins as Miss MacCowan
- Bruce Beeby as Dr Gasper
- Ruth Cracknell as Mrs Gaspen
- John Fegan as Tom Graham
- Brian Farley as Fred
- Janice Dinnen as Jean Holt
- Barbara Eather as Elsie
- William Rees as Mr Protheroe
- Gordon Chater as Reverend Galbraith

== Production ==
The novel Smiley had been so popular that author Moore Raymond followed it up with Smiley Gets a Gun in 1947.

The father of Colin Petersen, the actor who first played Smiley, wanted more money for him to return. This meant a replacement had to be found. Anthony Kimmins looked at over 4,000 other applicants before finding Keith Calvert. Moore Raymond also had returned to England, writing Smiley comics for Swift Comics. Kimmins' daughter Verena, who helped the young actors in the first Smiley movie, had a featured role in the film.

Filming took eight weeks towards the end of 1957. Shooting took place at Camden and Pagewood Studios. It was part of a "mini boom" of foreign productions in Australia in the late 1950s.

== Release ==
The film was less successful than its predecessor and a proposed third film, Smiley Wins the Ashes, was never made.
