= Bill Randle =

American disc jockey

Bill Randle (March 14, 1923 – July 9, 2004) was an American disc jockey, lawyer and university professor.

== Biography ==
Randle was born William McKinley Randle Jr. in Detroit, Michigan. In Detroit, he hosted a popular show on WJLB-AM radio (now WDTK) called The Interracial Goodwill Hour, featuring rhythm and blues music and hot jazz. As a pioneering disc jockey at radio station WERE in Cleveland, Ohio, he helped change the face of American music. In the 1950s, Time magazine called Randle the top DJ in America. His popularity and huge listening audience allowed him to bolster the careers of a number of young musicians, including the Four Lads, Bobby Darin, and Fats Domino. Nicknamed "The Pied Piper of Cleveland", a 1955 musical documentary film was made about him titled The Pied Piper of Cleveland: A Day in the Life of a Famous Disc Jockey. The film includes a Cleveland concert at Brooklyn High School on October 20, 1955, featuring Pat Boone and Bill Haley & His Comets with Elvis Presley as the opening act. It is the first commercial film footage of a Presley performance but has never been released.

Randle almost did not survive early radio. One Thanksgiving, he played an unusual version of "Silent Night" sung by gospel and blues artist Sister Rosetta Tharpe. Many persons called in to complain and the station manager, longtime radio and television fixture Sidney Andorn fired Randle. The next morning, WERE owner Ray T. Miller, the chairman of the Cuyahoga County Democratic Party, rehired Randle after he learned he had so many listeners to Randle's program, and fired Andorn instead.

While working in Cleveland, Randle would travel back to Detroit for some radio programs. In the late 1950s, Randle would fly back and forth from Cleveland to New York where he produced radio shows in both markets (at WERE and WCBS-AM, respectively). He sat alongside other top DJs of the era including Carl Reese, Phil McLean and Howie Lund.

In spring of 1955 Randle told listeners to his WERE radio show that while in New York City he had received a recording of a hot new talent from the singer's manager. He decided to premiere it in Cleveland (understanding the crossover appeal there of a young Elvis Presley). Randle championed Elvis' early recordings on Sun Records and those following his signing by RCA Victor that fall. On January 28, 1956, Bill Randle introduced Elvis on TV to America on the Dorsey Brothers' Stage Show.

Many songs that Randle championed on-air ended up as commercial hits, the most successful of which was an edited 45 rpm single of the Mormon Tabernacle Choir's "Battle Hymn of the Republic" which won the 1959 "Best Performance By A Vocal Group Or Chorus" at the 2nd annual GRAMMY Awards event. That version, which Randle suggested to and arranged with Columbia Records (then owned by CBS and a sister property to WCBS-AM) was an unlikely hit in 1959; it ended up on the Billboard charts for 11 weeks and reached as high as #13 on Billboard's "Hot 100" that autumn. In addition, the album The Lord's Prayer hit No. 1 and stayed on the charts for 80 weeks.

A wealthy Bill Randle left Cleveland radio in the 1960s to further his education. During the 1960s, Randle appeared on the local CBS affiliates in New York City interviewing celebrities. He obtained an undergraduate degree from Wayne State University and a law degree from Oklahoma City University. He went on to earn a doctorate in American studies, a master's degree in sociology from Case Western Reserve University, a master's degree in journalism from Kent State University and a master's degree in education from Cleveland State University. He was also awarded an honorary doctorate from Bowling Green State University. Randle also studied history at Columbia University under Richard Hofstadter. While away from radio, Randle taught popular music at Case Western Reserve University assisted by Roger Lee Hall. Randle also taught communications at Kent State University, Phillips University (Enid, Oklahoma), and the University of Cincinnati.

At age 64, he passed the Ohio State Bar exams and opened a law office in Lakewood, Ohio, where he practiced bankruptcy and estate planning law for sixteen years. He also was knowledgeable in energy and zoning law. In addition, Randle became an educator, and taught sociology and mass communication classes at several universities.

During the 1970s and 1980s, Randle resurfaced on several different Cleveland radio stations, even hosting a talk show on WBBG 1260-AM in 1977. In the 1990s, Randle joined the airstaff of the now-defunct WRMR 850-AM, anchoring the Big Show on Sunday afternoons and a late-afternoon program. His success in afternoon drive time prompted station management to move him to morning drive time in April 1998. While the station's format was adult standards similar to the Music of Your Life satellite network, Randle's shows bucked the mold, featuring a unique combination of big band standards, early rock and roll, and new artists such as Norah Jones, Michael Buble, *N Sync, Jewel, Sarah Vaughn, Dido and the Backstreet Boys. Following an ownership, format and frequency swap in 2001, Randle retired from full-time on-air duties at WRMR. However, he would rejoin the rechristened WCLV 1420-AM a year later with a Saturday night music show, which would ultimately move back to Sunday afternoons as the Big Show. (WCLV would revert to the WRMR call letters in 2003.)

Dr. Randle died of cancer in Cleveland on July 9, 2004. In a sad irony, WRMR was sold off the day before, and signed off two days later with Randle's final broadcast, which had been prerecorded via voice-tracking.

His wife of 51 years, Annalee, with whom he had a daughter, Patricia, predeceased him in 2000.
