= Rafferty's Rules (radio series) =

Rafferty's Rules is a 1941 Australian radio series starring Chips Rafferty. Rafferty had just leapt to fame with a support role in the Australian film Forty Thousand Horsemen (1940). The series is significant as an early starring vehicle for Rafferty.

Rafferty had featured on radio station 2UE in episodes of Michael Willoughby's Breakfast Session. The station gave him his own show, Rafferty's Rules which aired each Monday to Friday from 7 am. to 8 a.m. and Saturday 7 a.m. to 8.30 a.m.
