= The Pied Piper of Cleveland =

1955 film

- Directed by: Arthur Cohen
- Produced by: Bill Randle
- Starring: Bill Randle
- Release date: 1955
- Country: United States
- Language: English

The Pied Piper of Cleveland: A Day in the Life of a Famous Disc Jockey is an American musical documentary film produced in the fall of 1955 documenting the career of disc jockey Bill Randle. Arthur Cohen directed the film, which was produced by Bill Randle himself.

Included in the film was live footage shot at several live shows at local high schools and auditoriums in Cleveland, Ohio on and around October 20, 1955. Performers featured included Elvis Presley (several months prior to his first RCA Records recording sessions), Bill Haley and His Comets (still riding high from "Rock Around the Clock" topping the US music charts), Pat Boone, LaVern Baker, Roy Hamilton, Johnnie Ray and others. This was the first film Presley ever appeared in, and is the "movie short" referred to by Randle when he introduced Presley on his first national TV appearance on Stage Show in early 1956. It was Bill Haley's second film appearance after his group appeared in the 1954 short film, Round Up of Rhythm.

A plaque commemorating one of the filmed performances is located at Brooklyn High School in Cleveland, and was installed by the Rock and Roll Hall of Fame.

The original forty-eight-minute film was supposed to be cut down to a twenty-minute "short" for national distribution, but never made it that far. As of 2005, 50 years after it was produced, the movie remains unreleased. There is some dispute over whether or not this film actually exists, although it was shown publicly, albeit only once in Cleveland, and excerpts were also aired on a Cleveland television station in 1956.

According to music historian Jim Dawson, Randle, before his death, sold the rights to the film to PolyGram, although it has been reported that Universal Studios has the negatives of the film in its vaults. Marshall Lytle, who was nearing the end of his tenure as bass player for the Comets, corroborates the existence of the film in his memoir, Still Rockin' Around the Clock, and makes the unsubstantiated claim that Colonel Tom Parker, Presley's manager, bought the film and destroyed the existing copies. It has been reported that Presley was invited to the concert, as he was appearing close by. He was not in the lineup, but showed up to meet fans. It appears that he did perform - lip syncing to his first record, stretching the show, as one act was running late; but the camera operator(s) refused to film him, as there was a limited amount of film.

While the first feature film of a live rock'n'roll, simply entitled Rock'n'Roll, occurred in 1959, produced by the American promoter Lee Gordon while operating in Australia, The Pied Piper of Cleveland was the first ever instance of a 35mm filming of a rock 'n' roll concert.

== The Alien Autopsy connection ==
The Pied Piper of Cleveland achieved notoriety in the 1990s when it was linked to the infamous "Alien Autopsy" film circulated by producer Ray Santilli. According to Santilli, he was attempting to obtain a copy of Pied Piper from a man who claimed to have been the cinematographer on the film. Instead of the rare Elvis film, Santilli claims, the cameraman offered him footage he claimed to have shot in the late 1940s of an alleged autopsy of an alien recovered from one of the UFO crash sites.

The FOX network produced a popular documentary, Alien Autopsy: Fact or Fiction? centred on this footage, which was later debunked (by FOX) as being a hoax. This has led to some claims that Pied Piper is likewise a hoax; however, documentation supporting the film's existence predates the Alien Autopsy affair by many years.
