= A Sound of Trumpets =

- Written by: Donald Bull
- Directed by: Henri Safran
- Country of origin: Australia
- Original language: English

Production
- Running time: 60 mins

Original release
- Release: 3 June 1964 (Sydney)

A Sound of Trumpets is a 1964 Australian drama directed by Henri Safran.

== Premise ==
A family wants to adopt a refugee boy.

== Cast ==
- Nigel Lovell
- Henry Gilbert
- Peter Wagner
- Mark McManus
- Philippa Baker
- Janice Dinnen as Pam

== Reception ==
The Sydney Morning Herald criticised the "excessive detail" and called it "dour, plodding, earnest" but said it "explored its chosen situation thoroughly enough to illuminate not so much a social problem as the complex interdependence of ordinary family life."

The Bulletin said "this banal story, of an insufferable do-gooder and his equally insufferable family of long-suffering stereotypes faced with practising what they preach in the adoption of a refugee boy, rubbed its second-hand humanity in the audience's face with all the subtlety of Sonny Liston wielding a nine-pound hammer. Only Janice Dinnen’s remarkably mature performance as the eldest daughter and Ethel Gabriel’s complaining grandmother achieved any semblance of sympathy or credibility."

== See also ==
- List of television plays broadcast on Australian Broadcasting Corporation (1960s)
