= The Way Back (TV play) =

- Genre: religious
- Starring: Margaret Christensen
- Country of origin: Australia
- Original language: English

Production
- Running time: 30 mins
- Production company: TCN-9

Original release
- Network: TCN-9
- Release: 6 April 1958

The Way Back is a 1958 Australian television play. It was the first professional live drama featuring professional actors filmed for Australian commercial television.

It was made for Easter Sunday.

== Premise ==
The story of the rehabilitation of a derelict.

== Cast ==
- Margaret Christensen
- Leonard Bullen
- Frank Taylor
- Ken Fraser
