= The Flaming Sword (1958 film) =

- Directed by: Dave Lee
- Starring: Geoffrey Black
- Release date: 1958
- Country: United Kingdom
- Language: English
- Box office: 4 304 624 admissions (France)

The Flaming Sword is a 1958 British film directed by Dave Lee and starring Geoffrey Black and Reg Lye.

== Cast ==
- Geoffrey Black as Gordie
- Reg Lye as Poggy
- Douglas McLand as Blind John
- Terence Morgan as Captain
- Chips Rafferty as Long Tom
- Laird Stuart as Timmy
- Frank Thring as Gar

== Reception ==
The film was a box office failure.
