= Johnny Rebb =

- Born: Donald James Delbridge; 20 March 1939
- Died: 28 July 2014 (aged 75) Newcastle, New South Wales
- Occupations: Singer, panel beater
- Years active: 1958–1976
- Label: Leedon

Johnny Rebb, born Donald James Delbridge, (20 March 1939 – 28 July 2014) was an Australian singer.

== Career ==
While working as a panel beater, Rebb began his music career as a country & western singer. In 1956, aged around 17 he was influenced by the film Rock Around The Clock and approached John Charter, a music arranger and keyboard player, to start a band. They approached Festival Records and EMI but were finally noticed by Lee Gordon and signed up with Leedon Records.

In mid-October 1959, Rebb (and The Rebels) performed in shows titled Lee Gordon's 1959 Rock'n'Roll Spectacular. The Sydney concerts were edited into a film called Rock 'n' Roll which premiered on 30 October. The film, thought lost but rediscovered in 2020, includes rare footage of a 1950s rock and roll concert in Australia.

He was dubbed the "Gentleman of Rock" by disc jockeys of the time and replaced Johnny O'Keefe as the MC of Saturday Rock while O'Keefe was in the USA. In 1965, with the onslaught of rock'n'roll, Rebb began singing in the band The Atlantics and became their lead singer. After the band finished performing live in 1970, he continued solo until the mid-70s.

He died of emphysema in 2014 and was survived by his wife Elizabeth.

== Singles ==
- "Johnny B. Goode" / "Rebel Rock" - Columbia, 1958
- "Think Me A Kiss" /"Love Ville" - Coronet, 1960
- "Lonesome Road" / "We Belong Together" - Leedon, 1960
- "Hey Sheriff" / "Noeline" - Leedon, 1959
- "How Will It End" /"There You Go" - Coronet, 1960
- "Anytime You Want Me" / "She's Just Another Girl" - Coronet, 1961
- "Billy Blue Shoes" / "Letter A Day" - London, 1962
- "Got Over It" / "Secret" - CBS, 1963
