= The Queen in Australia =

- Film poster
- Directed by: Stanley Hawes
- Produced by: Stanley Hawes
- Narrated by: Peter Finch; Wilfred Thomas
- Production company: Film Australia
- Release date: 1954
- Running time: 68 mins
- Country: Australia
- Language: English
- Budget: £73,060
- Box office: £37,000

The Queen in Australia is a 1954 documentary about the visit of Queen Elizabeth II to Australia in 1954. It was the first colour film made in Australia.

It was released in the US by the Australian government information service.
