= Dawn! =

- Original release poster
- Directed by: Ken Hannam
- Written by: Joy Cavill
- Produced by: Joy Cavill
- Starring: Bronwyn Mackay-Payne; Ron Haddrick; Bunny Brooke; Tom Richards; Ivar Kants
- Cinematography: Russell Boyd
- Edited by: Max Lemon
- Music by: Michael Carlos
- Production company: South Australian Film Corporation
- Distributed by: Hoyts Distribution (Australia)
- Release dates: 8 March 1979 (USA); 19 March 1979 (Australia)
- Running time: 109 minutes
- Country: Australia
- Language: English
- Budget: $641,000

Dawn! is a 1979 Australian sports biopic about the three-time Olympic gold medallist swimmer Dawn Fraser, who served as technical adviser for the production. It starred Bronwyn Mackay Payne and Bunney Brooke, and was written by Joy Cavill and directed by Ken Hannam. The film was entered into the 11th Moscow International Film Festival.

== Plot ==
The film deals with Dawn Fraser's rise to fame as a champion Olympic swimmer, her anti-authoritarian clashes with Australian Swimming officials, her triumphs, marriage and eventual divorce.

== Cast ==
- Bronwyn Mackay-Payne as Dawn Fraser
- Ron Haddrick as Pop
- Bunney Brooke as Mum
- Tom Richards as Harry
- John Diedrich as Gary
- Gabrielle Hartley as Kate
- Ivar Kants as Len
- David Cameron as Joe
- Kevin Wilson as Bippy
- Kevin Manser as Official
- John Clayton as Syd
- Lyndall Barbour as Edie
- Deborah Kennedy
- Bob Baines as 12th Policeman

== Production ==
The film was produced by Joy Cavill who had previously made a documentary, The Dawn Fraser Story (1964).

In the 1970s Cavill wrote a script based on Fraser's life and showed it to Jill Robb and John Morris of the South Australian Film Corporation. They agrees to put up $250,000 and raise the balance of the money in exchange for 50% of the profits.

The lead, Bronwyn Mackay-Payne, was cast after a search that involved interviewing 1,200 girls and screen testing ten. Mackay-Payne had never acted before.

Shooting began on 19 September 1977 and went for ten weeks, with studio work in Adelaide and location shooting in Balmain, Sydney, Melbourne Olympic Stadium, and Tokyo.

== Reception ==
The film performed disappointingly at the box office.

== See also ==
- Cinema of Australia
- List of Australian films
- Australian films of 1979
- List of films set in Australia
- List of films shot in Adelaide
