= Adventure Unlimited =

1965 Australian television series

- Genre: Anthology
- Created by: Lee Robinson
- Directed by: Ken Hannam; Robin Lovejoy
- Composer: Bruce Finlay
- Country of origin: Australia
- Original language: English
- No. of seasons: 1
- No. of episodes: 10

Production
- Executive producer: Herb McIntyre
- Producer: Lee Robinson
- Editor: Don Saunders
- Running time: 25 mins
- Production company: Waratah Productions

Original release
- Network: TEN-10
- Release: 8 October – 10 December 1965

Adventure Unlimited is a 1965 Australian anthology television series. It was produced by Lee Robinson and associate produced by Joy Cavill. The directors included Ken Hannam. It was made by Waratah Film Productions a short lived company that came out of an unsuccessful attempt to gain a third commercial television licence.

It has been described as "surprisingly obscure" considering the talent involved.

== Broadcast history ==
The series was made in 1963, but was not shown in Sydney until 1965, airing on Channel Ten on Friday nights at 7.30. An episode appears to have aired on Thursday, 30 September 1965.

It was not seen in Melbourne until 1968, where it started 15 September. It sold to Canadian television and screened there in 1965.

== Episodes ==
Ten episodes were completed, three episodes were abandoned mid-production and a further 13 episodes were planned.

No.	Title	Directed by	Written by	Original release date
1	"The Buffalo Hunters"	Lee Robinson	Cecil Holmes	8 October 1965
Ted Abbot is a buffalo hunter struggling to make a living. He decides to go into breeding buffalo but struggles to round them up. His wife’s cousin, Julie, who is visiting, flirts with pilot Don Williams to get him to help. Cast: Grant Taylor, Jacqueline Knott, Gay Hartley, Leonard Teale, Alan Stewart, Yorkie Tilly as himself.
2	"Uncontrolled Territory"	Robin Lovejoy	Unknown	15 October 1965
In the highlands of Papua New Guinea, a young Australian patrol officer leads his party to search for the survivors of a plane crash near the Indonesian border. He becomes the first white man to contact a tribe of cannibals. Cast: Richard Meikle, Reg Livermore, Chris Christensen.
3	"Adventure Unlimited"	Robin Lovejoy	D'arcy Niland	22 October 1965
Two divers, Snow and Frank, are commissioned by a steel company to survey the sands of a section of the Great Barrier Reef for limestone. The area is full of sharks and divers go on a shark killing spree when a strange boat turns up with armed men on board. The men steal the divers’ boat and proceed to hunt them. However, the divers ambush the men on their own boat and take them prisoner. It turns out they are bringing in illegal aliens. Cast: Murray Rose, Richard Meikle, Alexander Cann, Peter Williams, Wal Gibbins, Ray Teal.
4	"Crocodile"	Robin Lovejoy	Lee Robinson	29 October 1965
For weeks, two crocodile hunters are on the trail of Melangie (“the evening star”), a giant crocodile valued at £500, if it can be captured alive for a zoo. The plans go astray when three American female tourists arrive in Arnhem Land to record the mating call of the crocodile. Local Aboriginals tell the women to leave as they are trespassing. The crocodile hunters refuse to help, but advise the women to “give them (the Aboriginals) things.” Bob is attracted to Ethel. Cast: Chips Rafferty, Sophie Stewart, Bonnie Walker, Gwen Plumb, Ted Hepple.
5	"The Witness"	Robin Lovejoy	Joy Cavill	5 November 1965
Detective Sgt Hamilton is sent to Papua New Guinea to escort the witness to a murder in Sydney years ago by a gangster called Benson. She’s a nun, Sister Francesca, working at a Roman Catholic mission on the upper Sepik River. Hamilton brings her back to a small town where she’s met by Father Raymond who is going to accompany her for the rest of the trip. Raymond works for Benson, who has been paying bribes to Hamilton for years. Raymond tells Benson to look the other way. Cast: Owen Weingott, Janette Craig, Bob McDarra, Don Phelps, Beryl Meekin, Mike Maxwell
6	"The Rivals"	Ken Hannam	Unknown	12 November 1965
Set in Mount Hagen in Papua New Guinea. A regional show takes place and sees a feud between two coffee growers, Gordon Gillespie and Bob Cole with Gordon’s Bossboy as prize. The competition is a draw, and the Bossboy goes off to start his own plantation. Cast: Alexander Archdale, Chips Rafferty, Nigel Lovell, Lowell Thomas
7	"The Coastwatcher"	Ken Hannam	Walter Brooksbank	19 November 1965
The story of coast watcher Arthur Reginald Evans, who helped save the lives of John F. Kennedy and the PT 109 crew after their boat was sunk by a Japanese destroyer in the Bracket Strait. Cast: Fred Parslow as Arthur Reginald Evans
8	"Camel Patrol"	Robin Lovejoy	Brian Wright; Story by Lee Robinson	26 November 1965
In the Finke River district, a young officer, Max, takes over the district from a more experienced one by undertaking a camel patrol. When the camels are stolen, the two men almost die. Cast: Ron Haddrick, Neil Fitzpatrick, Jessica Noad, Tubba Tubba, Shorty
9	"The Silver Backed Brushes"	Ken Hannam	Kay Keavney; Story by Joyce Spelling	3 December 1965
Set in 1942 in Madang, Papua New Guinea. It’s based on a true story about the first front line marriage to take place in New Guinea during the Pacific War. It tells the true story of nurse Margaret Evans of the Army Medical Woman’s Service, and her brief marriage to Air Force pilot Bill Malone which lasted only minutes, as he was killed shielding her with his body during an air raid immediately after the wedding. Cast: Mary Reynolds, Tom Oliver, Thelma Scott, John Armstrong, Jeanie Drynan, Judith Arthy, Mike Thomas, Olga Blood, Kingsley Jackson
10	"Summer Affair"	Ken Hannam	Michael Plant and Evan Green	10 December 1965
Set on Hayman Island. A drama involving a rich heiress, her husband and a pretty young singer. Cast: Tom Oliver, Clarissa Kaye, Ron Haddrick, Gabrielle Hartley

== Production ==
Lee Robinson had extensive experience making documentaries and films in New Guinea and the outback.

Five episodes were shot in New Guinea – "The Rivals", "Uncontrolled Territory", "The Rescue", "The Witness", and "Silver Backed Brushes". Tom Oliver called the result of "Silver Backed Brushes" "awful" and "terrible".

Gwen Plumb wrote in her memoirs that "Crocodile" was shot in 1961 in East Arnhem Land, 200 km (120 mi) from Darwin. Plumb wrote "we were told it was a rich man's safari camp where brave sportsmen from all over the world, and particularly America, shot crocodiles, water buffaloes, kangaroos - anything that moved. So Sophie [Stewart] and I packed a couple of cocktail frocks. It was the biggest dump you could ever imagine." Plumb says conditions were unsanitary, water buffalo would wanted through the camp at will", and the camp 'was run by a looney called Alan Stewart who wore a pistol in his belt.'" A crocodile was brought in from the aquarium in Darwin and Plumb says it passed out in the heat. She enjoyed filming at a lagoon, and a plane that flew in beer every night. "One night it didn't and we mutinied till they send another," wrote Plumb.

The National Film and Sound Archive holds a copy of "The Buffalo Hunters", though it is listed there as episode 6.

== Reception ==
The episode titled "Adventure Unlimited" was reviewed in the Sydney Morning Herald by Kylie Tennant who said "besides being dull it was slow".
