= Stanley Hawes =

British-born documentary film producer and director

- Born: 19 January 1905; England
- Died: 19 April 1991 (aged 86); Sydney
- Occupation(s): Documentary film producer and director; Film administrator

Stanley Gilbert Hawes MBE, (19 January 1905 – 19 April 1991) was a British-born documentary film producer and director who spent most of his career in Australia, though he commenced his career in England and Canada. He was born in London, England and died in Sydney, Australia. He is best known as the Producer-in-Chief (1946–1969) of the Australian Government's filmmaking body, which was named, in 1945, the Australian National Film Board, and then, in 1956, the Commonwealth Film Unit. In 1973, after he retired, it became Film Australia.

== Career ==
He started work in 1922 as a committee clerk with the City of Birmingham Corporation, but started his film career in 1931, when he co-founded the Birmingham Film Society. He arrived in Australia in 1946, from the National Film Board of Canada, to take up a position as Producer-in-Chief with the Australian National Film Board, initially as a temporary assignment but made permanent within a couple of years of his arrival. Hawes is regarded as working primarily in the classical style of documentary he learnt with John Grierson in the 1930s. As Moran writes, 'Films such as School in the Mailbox, Flight Plan and The Queen in Australia make clear his aesthetic preference for the classic documentary rather than for drama or the more evocative, poetic forms of documentary'.

He was elected a member of the board in 1952 and became a member of the British Film Academy the following year. He joined UNESCO in 1958 and chaired the National Film Theatre of Australia between 1970 and 1974. In 1971 he was appointed to chair the Film Board of Review.

== Awards ==
In 1970 he was awarded an MBE and the Raymond Longford Award from the Australian Film Institute

== The Stanley Hawes Award ==
The $5,000 Film Australia Stanley Hawes Award was established in 1997 to honour Stanley Hawes as first Producer-in-Chief of the Australian National Film Board and Commonwealth Film Unit. The award recognises the significant support he gave independent filmmakers in the documentary sector and is thus awarded to a person or organisation that makes an outstanding contribution to the documentary sector in Australia. The award is announced annually at the Australian International Documentary Conference.

Awardees:

- 1997 Graham Chase
- 1999 John Heyer
- 2001 Pat Fiske
- 2003 Stewart Young
- 2004 Robin Hughes
- 2005 CAAMA (Central Australian Aboriginal Media Association) Productions
- 2006 John Hughes
- 2007 Michael Gissing
- 2008 David Bradbury
- 2009 Bob Connolly
- 2010 Tom Zubrycki
- 2011 Rachel Perkins
- 2012 Julia Overton
- 2013 Documentary Australia Foundation
- 2014 Chris Hilton
- 2015 Pauline Clague
- 2016 Sonya Pemberton
- 2017 Brian Beaton
- 2018 Curtis Levy
- 2019 James Bradley
- 2020 Janine Hosking
- 2021 Michaela Perske
- 2022 David Tiley

== Selected filmography ==
=== Producer ===
- Today We Live: A Film of Life in Britain (1937, Associate producer)
- Here is the Land (1937)
- Timber Front (1940)
- Heroes of the Atlantic (1941)
- Women are Warriors (1942)
- Crocodile Hunters (1949)
- Darwin-Doorway to Australia (1949)
- Australia's Greatest River (1950)
- Know Your Children (1950)
- The Shearers (1950)
- Bush Policemen (1952)
- Snowy Waters (1952)
- Mike and Stefani (1952)
- Outback Patrol (1952)
- Across the Frontiers (1953)
- Bush Policeman (1953)
- The Queen in Australia (1954)
- Melbourne Olympic City (1956)
- Bring out a Briton (1958)
- Welcome Your Majesty (1958)
- The Queen Returns (1963)
- The Presidential Tour (1966)
- Expo 70 series (1970)

=== Director ===
- The G.B.I. Geography of Scotland: Water Power (1937)
- Here is the Land (1937)
- Man into Monkey (1938)
- Speed the Plough (1939)
- The Home Front (1940)
- Maple Sugar Time (1941)
- The World in Action: The Invasion of North Africa (1942)
- School in the Mailbox (1946)
- Building for Tomorrow (1947)
- Flight Plan (1950)
- The Queen in Australia (1954)
- Children's Theatre (1961)

=== Editor ===
- Dry Dock (1936)
