= Bring Out a Briton =

- Directed by: Lee Robinson
- Narrated by: Chips Rafferty
- Production company: Australian National Film Board
- Release date: October 1957
- Country: Australia
- Language: English

Bring Out a Briton was an Australian propaganda short film directed by Lee Robinson and presented by Chips Rafferty.

It was made by the Australian government to promote British emigration to Australia as part of the "Bring Out a Briton" campaign launched in 1957 by Athol Townley.
