= Margaret Christensen =

Australian radio hostess, actress (1921–2009)

Margaret Christensen OAM
- Born: 8 January 1921; Beulah Park, South Australia, Australia
- Died: 30 November 2009 (aged 88); Melbourne, Victoria, Australia
- Other names: Margaret Cristensen, Peg Christenson (credited as)
- Occupations: Radio hostess; actress
- Years active: 1940s–2002
- Children: 2 (including Sean Scully)

Margaret Christensen (8 January 1921–30 November 2009), also credited as Margaret Caristensen and Peg Christensen, was an Australian radio hostess and character actress, who appeared in numerous television series, primarily in guesting roles.

Christensen was known for her role as Emmie Lawson, starring alongside Queenie Ashton, Gwen Plumb and Ethel Lang in the long-running Gwen Meredith radio series Blue Hills. She was a pioneer woman in radio at a time when the medium was largely dominated by men.

== Early life ==
Christensen was born on 8 January 1921 in Adelaide, to Herbert and Nell Christensen. Her siblings were Bertie and Chris. The family relocated to Sydney when she was three, where Christensen began speech and drama classes at the age of six. At the age of 16, she earned a diploma in teaching, with honours in voice production and literature.

When she was 18, Christensen earned a scholarship to study at Trinity College London, but World War II put an end to her plans. Instead, she moved to Brisbane where her brother Chris worked as a radio announcer.

== Career ==
Christensen gained radio experience in Brisbane, presenting shows on 4BH for three years. After marrying and starting a family, she relocated to Sydney in 1943, where she initially landed small roles in radio, most notably as Jane Bennet in a serial of Pride and Prejudice, alongside Lyndall Barbour.

She next landed the titular role in radio serial, Josephine, Empress of Sorrows, after which time she appeared in nationally-broadcast Sunday night radio plays and had consistent roles in radio serials, including playing Jessie, Dexter's wife, in 2GB sitcom, Life with Dexter.

She appeared on stage in a 1945 production of They Came to a City, playing the role of waitress, Alice. She also performed at the Mercury Theatre and Independent Theatre. From 1949 to 1954, she played Lois Lane in a radio adaptation of Superman, while presenting commercials and sketches in Calling the Stars and other variety shows.

In 1956, Christensen began working in film, playing the mother of the titular character in Smiley, before reprising the role in the 1958 sequel Smiley Gets a Gun.

Christensen appeared in long-running radio series Blue Hills as Emmie Lawson and played opposite John Gray as Lucienne in The Fiends in 1958. She also worked as 'The Side Saddle DJ' on Sydney radio station, 2UE.

In 1959, Christensen moved to London for seven years, where she worked in radio and stage, including the premiere production of Noël Coward's Sail Away on the West End. While there, her son Sean followed her into acting. Returning to Sydney in 1966, Christensen appeared in stage productions of Funny Girl and Fiddler on the Roof.

In her later years, Christensen worked as a voice-over artist and had guest roles in television shows including Stingers, All Saints and Blue Heelers. She also had a minor role in 1998 film Babe: Pig in the City, the sequel to Babe.

In 2008, Christensen was awarded the Medal of the Order of Australia.

== Personal life ==
Christensen met violinist Dan Scully in Brisbane. The couple were married and had a daughter, Wendy, before moving to Sydney. In 1947, the couple had a son, actor and singer Sean Scully, but later divorced.

Christensen lived in London from 1959 to 1966, taking son Sean with her. In the early 1970s, she moved to Japan, where her daughter Wendy was living and raising a family. While there, she taught English and dubbed Japanese films.

== Death ==
Christensen died in hospital on 30 November 2009, at the age of 88. She was survived by her two children, three grandchildren and four great-grandchildren.

== Awards ==
| Year | Work | Award | Category | Result | Ref. |
|---|---|---|---|---|---|
| 1953 | The Petrified Forest | Macquarie Award | Best Actress in a Leading Role | Won | |
| 2008 | Margaret Christensen | Medal of the Order of Australia | | Honoured | |

== Filmography ==
=== Film ===
| Year | Title | Role | Notes | Ref. |
|---|---|---|---|---|
| 1955 | Three in One | Customer | Anthology film, segment: "The City" | |
| 1956 | Smiley | Mrs Greevins | | |
| 1958 | Smiley Gets a Gun | Mrs Greevins | | |
| 1982 | Kitty and the Bagman | Band of Hope Lady | | |
| 1998 | Babe: Pig in the City | Haughty Woman | | |

=== Television ===
| Year | Title | Role | Notes | Ref. |
|---|---|---|---|---|
| 1958 | The Way Back | | TV play | |
| 1960; 1961 | Theatre 70 | Madge Saul / Mrs. Fenwick | 2 episodes | |
| 1961 | Probation Officer | Mrs. Carmichael | 1 episode | |
| 1963 | Compact | Shirley Hawkins | 9 episodes | |
| 1964 | Story Parade | Woman at Clinic | 1 episode | |
| 1965 | The Flying Swan | Jo | 1 episode | |
| 1965 | Crossroads | Sally Morrison / Miss Morrison | 5 episodes | |
| 1966 | Australian Playhouse | Esme Hutton | Episode: "No Dogs on Diamond Street" | |
| 1966–1974 | Homicide | Various roles | 5 episodes | |
| 1969 | Skippy the Bush Kangaroo | Mrs. Woodleigh-Smith | Season 3, episode 3: "A Work of Art" | |
| 1970–1974 | Division 4 | Various roles | 6 episodes | |
| 1972 | Lane End | Grandma Pappas | Miniseries, 7 episodes | |
| 1973 | Frank and Francesca | | 6 episodes | |
| 1974 | Matlock Police | Beverley Jones | 1 episode | |
| 1975 | Number 96 | Celia Palmer | 3 episodes | |
| 1976 | Certain Women | | 1 episode | |
| 1976 | King's Men | | 1 episode | |
| 1978 | Glenview High | Virginia Gold | 1 episode | |
| 1979 | Barnaby and Me | Doctor | TV movie | |
| 1979 | Doctor Down Under | Mrs. Beaumont | 3 episodes | |
| 1980 | Cop Shop | Hilda Perry | 1 episode | |
| 1981 | Airhawk (aka Star of the North) | Mum Foster | TV movie | |
| 1985 | The Pickwick Papers | Voice artist | Animated TV movie | |
| 1987 | Treasure Island | Voice artist | Animated TV movie | |
| 1989 | Rafferty's Rules | Phyllis O'Neal | Season 5, 1 episode | |
| 1990 | Outback O'Bourke | Narrator | Documentary | |
| 1993 | Tracking the Rainbow Serpent | Narrator | Documentary | |
| 1991 | A Country Practice | Female caller | Episode: "A Trouble Shared" | |
| 1994 | G.P. | Gran | 1 episode | |
| 1995 | Kansas | Verna Mason | TV movie | |
| 1995 | Blue Heelers | Venetia Hayes | Season 2, 1 episode | |
| 1998; 1999 | All Saints | Edna / Carol Birch | 2 episodes | |
| 2002 | Stingers | Alice | Season 6, episode 6: "The Last Dance" | |

== Theatre ==
| Year | Title | Role | Notes | Ref. |
|---|---|---|---|---|
| 1945 | They Came to a City | Alice | New Theatre, Sydney | |
| 1952 | They Knew What They Wanted | Amy | Mercury Theatre, Sydney | |
| 1961 | Time and Yellow Roses | Laurette Gerard | His Majesty's Theatre, Aberdeen, St Martin's Theatre, London | |
| 1962–1963 | Sail Away | Mrs Lush (Alvin's mother) | Bristol Hippodrome, Savoy Theatre, London | |
| 1966 | Funny Girl | Mrs Strakosh | Australian tour with J. C. Williamson's | |
| 1967–1969 | Fiddler on the Roof | Yente | Australian tour with J. C. Williamson's | |
| 1974 | Doctor in the House | The Matron | Princess Theatre, Melbourne, Her Majesty's Theatre, Brisbane with AETT | |
| 1976 | Da | | Tasmanian tour with Tasmanian Theatre Company | |
| 1990 | The Lesson / Krapp's Last Tape | | Crossroads Theatre, Sydney | |
| 1996–1997 | Last Night of the Proms | Queen Victoria | Sydney Opera House | |

== Radio ==
| Year | Title | Role | Notes | Ref. |
|---|---|---|---|---|
| | Pride and Prejudice | Jane Bennet | | |
| 1940s | Josephine, Empress of Sorrows | Josephine | 2GB | |
| 1940s–1950s | Cashmere Bouquet Show | (PRT) | 2UE | |
| 1940s–1950s | Leave it to the Girls | | 2GB | |
| 1941–1951 | Mrs 'Obbs | Mr Bundle's Secretary | 2GB | |
| 1944–1949 | The Lawsons | Ruth Lawson (Chris's wife) | ABC Radio | |
| 1947 | Strange Destiny | Lady Hester Stanhope | 2UW | |
| 1947– | Courtship and Marriage | | 2UW / 3UZ | |
| Late 1940s–1951 | Hagen's Circus | Winnie Nelson | | |
| 1949–1954 | Superman | Lois Lane | 2GB | |
| 1950– | Death Takes Small Bites | Charmain Anthony | 2UW | |
| 1951–1960s | Hart of the Territory | Leslie Winters | 2GB | |
| 1952 | They Knew What They Wanted | | | |
| 1952–1956 | Strike it Rich | (ANN) | | |
| 1953 | Danger in Paradise | Iris Randall | 2UW | |
| 1953–1964 | Life with Dexter | Jessie | 2GB | |
| 1954– | Dick Tracy | | 2UW | |
| 1954–1955 | The Hunted One | Nina Sabin | 3KZ | |
| 1954–1956 | Dangerous Assignment | Marga / Louella / Liana | Episode 11: "Turkey", episode 24: "Cuba", episode 51: "Coral Sea" | |
| 1955 | White Coolies | Sister Delforce | | |
| 1955– | Laura Chilton | | 2UW / 3KZ | |
| 1958 | The Fiends | Lucienne | 2GB | |
| 1958 | Phantom Time | | | |
| 1963 | Dr Paul | Virginia Martin | 2UW | |
| | Air Hostess | Diana Drew | | |
| | The Broken Circle | Angela Cartwright | | |
| | Dad and Dave from Snake Gully | Mabel | | |
| | Death by Horoscope | | Sequel to Death Takes Small Bites | |
| | The General Motors Hour | | 2GB | |
| 1979 | Lies My Father Told Me | Mother | ABC Radio | |
| 1979 | Uncle Moon | Lilah | ABC Radio | |
| 1979 | Laura and the Angel | Skittles | ABC Radio | |
| 1979 | The Great God Mogadon | Old Lady | ABC Radio | |
| 1979 | Lord Arthur Savile's Crime | Lady Clemtine | ABC Radio | |
