= Smiley (1956 film) =

1956 British film by Anthony Kimmins

- Directed by: Anthony Kimmins
- Written by: Anthony Kimmins; Moore Raymond
- Based on: Smiley; 1945 novel by Moore Raymond
- Produced by: Anthony Kimmins
- Starring: Ralph Richardson; Chips Rafferty; Colin Petersen
- Cinematography: Edward Scaife
- Music by: William Alwyn
- Production company: London Films
- Distributed by: 20th Century Fox
- Release dates: 28 June 1956 (London); 19 March 1957 (United States)
- Running time: 97 minutes
- Countries: United Kingdom; United States
- Language: English
- Budget: £250,000

Smiley is a 1956 British–American comedy film directed by Anthony Kimmins and starring Colin Petersen. It was based on the 1945 novel of the same name by Moore Raymond who co-wrote the film with Kimmins. It tells the story of a young Australian boy who is determined to buy a bicycle for four pounds, and along the way gets into many misadventures.

It was the last film made under the supervision of Alex Korda, who died in January 1956.

== Plot ==
Smiley Greevins is a mischievous boy who lives in the small country town of Murrumbilla (based on Augathella). His father is an alcoholic drover who is a poor provider for the family, and his mother works as a laundress. Smiley is always getting into trouble with his best friend Joey. He decides to try to save up enough money to buy a coveted bicycle.

Smiley takes on various odd jobs, showing enterprise, hard work, and persistence in slowly accumulating the considerable sum (£5) needed, despite getting involved in a number of pranks, including getting into trouble with the local law enforcement in the figure of Sergeant Flaxman. Smiley unwittingly helps the local publican, Jim Rankin, sell opium to aborigines who live in a camp near the town.

Smiley's father steals his savings and loses it playing two-up. Smiley accidentally knocks him out and runs away to the bush, where he is bitten by a snake. His life is saved by boundary rider Bill McVitty. Rankin is arrested and the townspeople chip in to buy Smiley a bike.

A romantic subplot involves Rankin and Sergeant Flaxman vying for the affections of Miss Workman the new local schoolmistress.

== Cast ==
- Colin Petersen as Smiley Greevins
- Alexander (Bruce) Thomas as Smiley on horse
- Bruce Archer as Joey
- Ralph Richardson as Reverend Lambeth
- John McCallum as Jim Rankin
- Chips Rafferty as Sergeant Flaxman
- Jocelyn Hernfield as Miss Workman
- Reg Lye as Pa Greevins
- Margaret Christensen as Ma Greevins
- Charles Tingwell as Mr Stevens
- Marion Johns as Mrs Stevens
- Gavin Davies as Fred Stevens
- Toni Hansen as Jean Holt
- William Rees as Mr Johnson
- John Fegan as Nobby
- Guy Doleman as Bill McVitty
- Leonard Teale as doctor
- Letty Craydon as lady at christening

== Production ==
=== Development ===
The film is based on the 1945 novel Smiley by Moore Raymond, who was born in Queensland but worked as a journalist in Britain. The book was hailed as an Australian Huckleberry Finn and film rights were bought immediately by Sir Alexander Korda. Korda sent Raymond to Australia in 1946 to find possible child actors and locations. However Korda said he could not find an appropriate director and shelved the project.

Korda eventually assigned the project to Anthony Kimmins, who had served in Australia in World War II. Kimmins arrived in Australia in March 1950 to begin pre-production and announced he would make the film near Augathella for £100,000. However, after actually inspecting the site he doubted it would be useful and he was unable to find a lead actor he was happy with. Plans to make the movie were delayed again.

Kimmins returned to Australia in September 1955 to begin pre-production. After interviewing over 2,000 boys, he cast Colin Peterson as Smiley and Bruce Archer as Joey.

Part of the budget was provided by 20th Century Fox, who had money frozen in Australia due to currency restrictions. Apart from Ralph Richardson, the entire cast was Australian. Korda reportedly took risky measures to finance the film, proceeding without a completion guarantee.

=== Shooting ===
Filming started in late October, with the township of Murrumbilla being created on an estate at Camden Park, Gundy, New South Wales, and finished eight weeks later. Post production work was done at Pagewood Studios in Sydney. It was filmed in CinemaScope.

Filming took 41 days.

== Release ==
The Age called it "the most amiable, unassuming and pleasing little film to be shot in Australia since Bush Christmas."

In July 1957 Kimmins announced the film had earned more than £150,000 at the British box office.

The film was followed by a sequel, Smiley Gets a Gun (1958), based on Raymond's second Smiley novel (he would write one more). It also spawned a hit single composed by Clyde Collins, "A Little Boy Called Smiley". There was a proposed third Smiley film but it was never made.

== Musical ==
The novel inspired Smiley The Musical with music by Clyde Collins, David Cocker, Mark Jones and Lance Strauss.

== Accolades ==
The screenplay received a Best British Screenplay nomination at the 1957 BAFTA awards.
