= Chips Rafferty =

Australian actor (1909–1971)

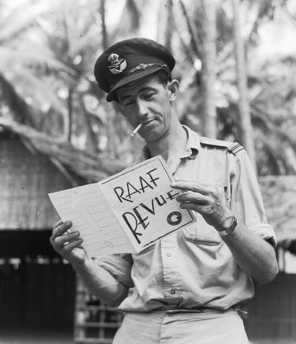
- Rafferty in 1943
- Born: John William Pilbean Goffage; 26 March 1909; Broken Hill, New South Wales, Australia
- Died: 27 May 1971 (aged 62); Sydney, New South Wales, Australia
- Resting place: Ashes cast into his favourite fishing hole in Lovett Bay, Pittwater
- Occupation: Actor
- Years active: 1939–1971
- Spouses: Jean Stewart Ferguson (1935–1940; divorced); Ellen Jameson (1941–1964; her death)

John William Pilbean Goffage MBE (26 March 1909 – 27 May 1971), known professionally as Chips Rafferty, was an Australian actor. Called "the living symbol of the typical Australian", Rafferty's career stretched from the late 1930s until he died in 1971, and during this time he performed regularly in major Australian feature films such as Wake in Fright, as well as appearing in British and American productions, including The Overlanders and The Sundowners. He appeared in commercials in Britain during the late 1950s, encouraging British emigration to Australia.

== Early days ==
John William Pilbean Goffage was born at Billy Goat Hill, near Broken Hill, New South Wales to John Goffage, an English-born stock agent, and Australian-born Violet Maude Joyce. Gaining the nickname "Chips" as a school boy, Rafferty studied at Parramatta Commercial School. At age 16, Rafferty began an apprenticeship as an iron moulder at Clyde Engineering Works before working in a variety of jobs, including opal miner, sheep shearer, drover, RAAF officer and pearl diver.

== Film career ==
Rafferty was in his thirties when he made his debut at Cinesound Studios. His first film role was as a fireman in Ken G. Hall's comedy Dad Rudd, M.P. (1940) - Hall later recalled he was looking for an actor who was tall and skinny as a visual contrast to others and Cinesound's casting director, Ron Whelan, introduced Hall to Rafferty. Hall enjoyed Rafferty's performance and when he shot some additional scenes for the comedy Ants in His Pants he used Rafferty again, although the part was much smaller. (This film was released prior to Dad Rudd MP which is why many list it first on Rafferty's filmography.) At that time, he managed a wine cellar in Bond Street, Sydney.

=== Forty Thousand Horsemen ===
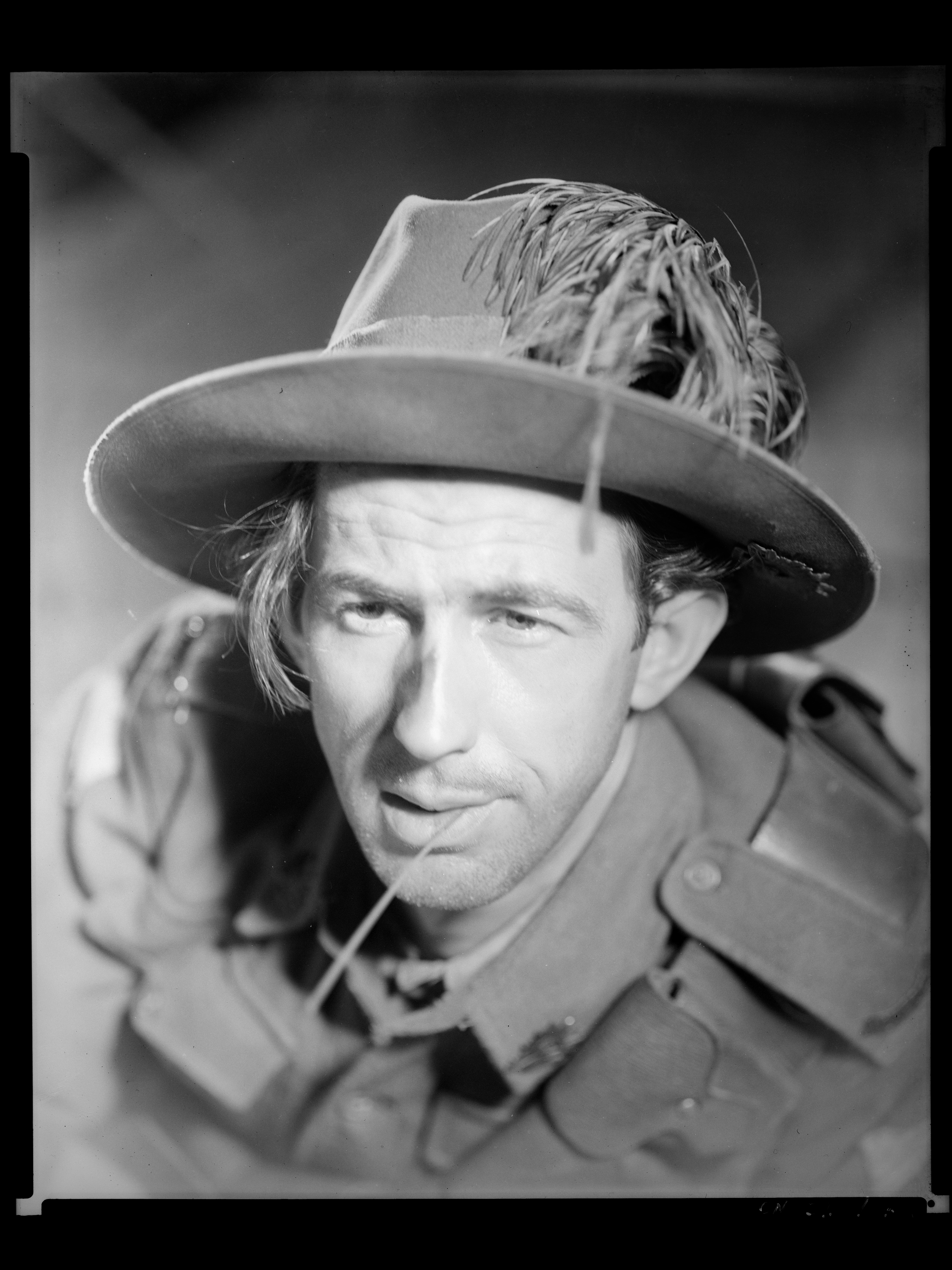
Portrait of Chips Rafferty, on the set of Forty Thousand Horsemen, 1940

Rafferty leapt to international fame when cast as one of the three leads in Forty Thousand Horsemen (1940), a film directed by Charles Chauvel that focused on the Battle of Beersheba in 1917. Rafferty's part was originally given to Pat Hanna but Chauvel changed his mind after being introduced to Rafferty by Ron Whelen and seeing a screen test with Rafferty. Chauvel described him as "a cross between Slim Summerville and James Stewart, and has a variety of droll yet natural humour." According to Filmink "Rafferty’s inexperience is evident, but it’s made up for by his presence."

Forty Thousand Horsemen was enormously popular and was screened throughout the world, becoming one of the most-seen Australian films made to that point. Although the film's romantic leads were Grant Taylor (actor) and Betty Bryant, Rafferty's performance received much acclaim.

=== War service ===
Rafferty married (1) Jean Stewart Ferguson, daughter of John Ferguson of Belmore at St. Stephen's Presbyterian Church, Sydney on 16 November 1935, divorcing in 1940 in Sydney.

Rafferty married (2) Ellen Kathleen "Quentin" Jameson on 28 May 1941. He enlisted in the Royal Australian Air Force the next day and entertained troops.

During the war, Rafferty was allowed to make films on leave. He appeared in a short featurette, South West Pacific (1943), directed by Hall. He was reunited with Chauvel and Grant Taylor in The Rats of Tobruk (1944), an attempt to repeat the success of Forty Thousand Horsemen.

Rafferty was discharged on 13 February 1945, having reached the rank of Flying Officer.

=== International fame ===
Ealing Studios were interested in making a feature film in Australia after the war, and assigned Harry Watt to find a subject. He came up with The Overlanders (1946), a story of a cattle drive during war time (based on a true story) and gave the lead role to Rafferty who Watt called an "Australian Gary Cooper."

Rafferty's fee was £25 a week. Ealing Studios were so pleased they signed Rafferty to a long-term contract even before the film was released. The film was a critical and commercial success and Rafferty was established as a film star.

Ealing Studios were associated with Rank Films, who cast Rafferty in the lead of Bush Christmas (1947), a children's movie where Rafferty played the villain. It was very popular.

Ealing Studios signed Rafferty to a long-term contract. He went to England to promote The Overlanders and Ealing put him in The Loves of Joanna Godden. While promoting the film in Hollywood he met Hedda Hopper who said Rafferty "created quite a stir. They call him the Australian Gary Cooper, but if he were cut down a bit he would be more like the late Will Rogers. I don't know how they'll get him on the screen unless they do it horizontally... He is as natural as an old shoe."

Ealing and Watt wanted to make another film in Australia and decided on a spectacle, Eureka Stockade. Rafferty was cast in the lead as Peter Lalor, the head of the rebellion, despite pressures in some quarters to cast Peter Finch. The result was a box office disappointment and Rafferty's performance was much criticised. A writer called it "one of the most spectacular pieces of miscasting in Australian cinematic history".

Rafferty was meant to follow this with a comedy for Ealing co-starring Tommy Trinder. Instead, Ealing put the two actors in a drama about aboriginal land rights Bitter Springs (1950). The film was not widely popular and Ealing wound up their filmmaking operation in Australia.

Rafferty kept busy as an actor, appearing on radio in a show Chips: Story of an Outback. He was cast by 20th Century Fox in a melodrama they shot in Australia, Kangaroo (1952). The studio liked his performance enough that they flew him (and Charles Tingwell) over to Los Angeles to play Australian soldiers in The Desert Rats (1953), a war movie.

=== Producer ===
Film production in Australia had slowed to a trickle and Rafferty decided to move into movie production. He wanted to make The Green Opal, a story about immigration but could not get finance. However he then teamed up with a producer-director Lee Robinson and they decided to make movies together.

Their first movie was The Phantom Stockman (1953), directed by Robinson and starring Rafferty, and produced by them both. The film was profitable. It was followed by King of the Coral Sea, which was even more popular, and introduced Rod Taylor to cinema audiences. Rafferty and Robinson attracted the interest of the French, collaborated with them on the New Guinea adventure tale, Walk Into Paradise (1956). This was their most popular movie to date.

Rafferty also appeared as an actor only in a British-financed comedy set in Australia, Smiley (1956). It was successful and led to a sequel, Smiley Gets a Gun (1958), in which Rafferty reprised his role. In England he appeared in The Flaming Sword (1958).

He also participated in cinema advertisements that were part of an Australian Government campaign in 1957 called "Bring out a Briton". The campaign was launched in a bid to increase the number of British migrants settling in Australia.

Rafferty and Robinson raised money for three more movies with Robinson. He elected not to appear in the fourth film he produced with Robinson, Dust in the Sun (1958), their first flop together. Nor was he in The Stowaway (1959) and The Restless and the Damned (1960). All three films lost money and Rafferty found himself in financial difficulty.

== Later career ==
Rafferty returned to being an actor only. He had a small role in The Sundowners (1960), with Robert Mitchum and Deborah Kerr and played a coastwatcher in The Wackiest Ship in the Army (1960) with Jack Lemmon and Ricky Nelson. He guest starred in several episodes of the Australian-shot TV series Whiplash (1961).

Rafferty was cast as one of the mutineers in the 1962 remake of Metro-Goldwyn-Mayer's Mutiny on the Bounty, starring Marlon Brando. The filming of Bounty in Tahiti dragged longer than six months but it restored him to financial health after the failure of his production company; it enabled him to buy a block of flats which supported him for the rest of his life. Rafferty dubbed the film The Bounteous Mutiny.

In 1962, the 6 foot 5 inch actor was socialising with fellow expatriates in a London club when they were joined by an Australian who acted as doorman, and unbeknownst to Rafferty, was a professional wrestler. Claiming he was being ignored after helping them get in the doorman was so argumentative that Rafferty was provoked into accepting a challenge to 'step outside'. In the severe beating that followed he sustained deep grazing across his face and suffered a myocardial infarction (he had not been aware of having a heart condition until the incident) costing him the chance at roles in two major film productions.

In 1963 he recorded a long play record with Festival Records (FL-31015) titled A Man and His Horse, narrating a selection of works from Australian verse composers including Banjo Paterson (1864–1941), Adam Lindsay Gordon (1833–1870) and Will H. Ogilvie (1869–1963).

Rafferty appeared in some episodes of the series Adventure Unlimited shot in 1963. He played the Australian Prime Minister in the Australian sci-fi TV series The Stranger (1964) then travelled to England and appeared in eight episodes of Emergency-Ward 10 (1964). While in England he was in The Winds of Green Monday (1965) on British TV.

He travelled to the US and guest starred in episodes of The Wackiest Ship in the Army (1965) (as a different character to the role that he played in the movie version). This led to further offers to work in Hollywood on television shows; he played a Union soldier in The Big Valley (1966) with a noticeably Australian accent. He was also in episodes of Gunsmoke (1966) and Daktari (1966). "What else can I do but look to America for my future when there is still no assistance or help from the government," said in April 1966.

Back in Australia Rafferty had a good part in the Australian-shot comedy They're a Weird Mob (1966) a big local success. He returned to Hollywood to appear in episodes of The Girl from UNCLE (1967), Tarzan (1967) and The Monkees, as well as the Elvis Presley movie Double Trouble (1967) and the adventure tale Kona Coast (1968)

Returning to Australia he guest-starred in Skippy the Bush Kangaroo, Adventures of the Seaspray (1967), Rita and Wally (1968), Woobinda, Animal Doctor (1970) and Dead Men Running (1971). He continued to make films such as Skullduggery (1970).

Rafferty's final film role was in 1971's Wake in Fright, where he played an outback policeman. (The movie was filmed mainly in and around Rafferty's home town of Broken Hill.) In a review of the film, a critic praised Rafferty's performance, writing that he "exudes an unnerving intensity with a deceptively menacing and disturbing performance that ranks among the best of his career".

His final performance was in an episode of the Australian war series Spyforce (1971).

Hours before he died, Rafferty was offered a prominent role in a film The Day the Clown Cried by Jerry Lewis which was never completed or released.

== Death ==
On 27 May 1971, Rafferty collapsed and died of a heart attack at the age of 62, while walking down a Sydney street shortly after completing his role in Wake in Fright. His wife Ellen had predeceased him in 1964 and they had no children. His remains were cremated and his ashes scattered into his favourite fishing hole in Lovett Bay.

Rafferty had been married to Jean Stewart Ferguson from 1935 to 1940.

== Honours ==
In the 1971 New Years' Honours, Rafferty was made a Member of the Order of British Empire (MBE) by Queen Elizabeth II for his services to the performing arts.

Australia Post issued a stamp in 1989 that depicted Rafferty in recognition of his work in Australian cinema, and in March 2006, Broken Hill City Council announced that the town's Entertainment Centre would be named in honour of Rafferty.

The Oxford Companion to Australian Film refers to Rafferty as "Australia's most prominent and significant actor of the 1940s–60s".

Australian singer/songwriter Richard Davies wrote a song, "Chips Rafferty" for his album, There's Never Been A Crowd Like This.

== Associations ==
He was also a talented artist, and as "Long John Goffage" was a leading light of the Black and White Artists' Club. He was a Freemason.

== Filmography ==
=== Film ===
Year	Title	Role	Notes
1939	Come Up Smiling (aka Ants in His Pants)	Man in Crowd (uncredited)	Feature film
1940	Dad Rudd, MP	Fireman (uncredited)	Feature film
1940	Forty Thousand Horsemen	Jim	Feature film
1943	South West Pacific	RAAF Mechanic	Short film
1944	The Rats of Tobruk	Milo Trent	Feature film
1946	The Overlanders	Dan McAlpine	Feature film
1947	Bush Christmas	Long Bill	Feature film
1947	The Loves of Joanna Godden	Collard	Feature film
1949	Eureka Stockade (aka Massacre Hill)	Peter Lalor	Feature film
1950	Bitter Springs	Wally King	Feature film
1952	Kangaroo (aka The Australian Story)	Trooper 'Len' Leonard	Feature film
1953	The Desert Rats	Sergeant 'Blue' Smith	Feature film
1953	The Phantom Stockman (aka Return of the Plainsman)	The Sundowner	Feature film. Also producer and co-writer.
1953	King of the Coral Sea	Ted King	Feature film. Also producer and co-writer.
1956	Smiley	Sergeant Flaxman	Feature film
1956	Walk Into Paradise (aka Walk into Hell)	Steve MacAllister	Feature film. Also producer.
1958	Smiley Gets a Gun	Sergeant Flaxman	Feature film
1958	The Flaming Sword	Long Tom	Feature film
1960	The Sundowners	Quinlan	Feature film
1960	The Wackiest Ship in the Army	Patterson	Feature film
1962	Mutiny on the Bounty	Michael Byrne	Feature film. Feature film
1962	Alice in Wonderland	White Knight	TV pantomime
1965	The Winds of Green Monday		TV play
1966	They're a Weird Mob	Harry Kelly	Feature film
1967	Double Trouble	Archie Brown	Feature film
1968	Kona Coast	Charlie Lightfoot	Feature film
1970	Skullduggery	Father 'Pop' Dillingham	Feature film
1971	Willy Willy	Old Man	Short film
1971	Wake in Fright	Jock Crawford	Feature film

=== Television ===
Year	Title	Role	Notes
1961	Whiplash	Sorrel / Patrick Flagg	TV series, 2 episodes
1964	The Stranger	The Australian Prime Minister	TV miniseries, episode 12
1964	Emergency Ward 10	Mick Doyle	TV series, 8 episodes
1965	The Wackiest Ship in the Army	Boomer McKye	TV series, 1 episode
1965	Adventure Unlimited	Bob Cole / Mick Larkin	TV series, 2 episodes
1966	The Big Valley	Jock, Union Soldier	TV series, 1 episode
1966	Gunsmoke	Angus McTabbott	TV series, 1 episode
1966	Daktari	Rayburn	TV series, 1 episode
1967	The Girl from U.N.C.L.E.	Liverpool 'Enry	TV series, 1 episode
1967	Tarzan	Dutch Jensen	TV series. 2 episodes
1967	The Monkees	Captain	S2:E12, "Hitting the High Seas"
1967	Skippy the Bush Kangaroo	Pop Miller	TV series, 1 episode
1967	Adventures of the Seaspray		TV series, 1 episode
1968	Rita and Wally	Mr Stiller	TV series, 1 episode
1969	Delta	Sawtell	TV series, 1 episode
1970	Woobinda, Animal Doctor	Grazier	TV series. 2 episodes
1971	Dead Men Running		TV miniseries
1971	Spyforce	Leon Reilley	TV series, episode: Reilley's Army (final appearance)

=== Unmade projects ===
Rafferty tried to make the following projects but was unsuccessful:

- Pepper Trees – comedy from Ealing about two immigrants, co-starring Tommy Trinder and Gordon Jackson, written and directed by Ralph Smart
- The Green Opal – a £60,000 film about immigration he tried to make in 1951
- Return of the Boomerang (1969) directed by Philip Leacock

=== Radio ===
- Rafferty's Rules (1941)
- Lightning Ridge Australian Walkabout (1948)
- The Sundowner (1950)
- Chips (1952)
- It's Not Cricket (1953)

== Notes ==
- Larkins, Bob (1986). Chips: The life and films of Chips Rafferty. Macmillan Company.
