= R. Maslyn Williams =

Australian documentary filmmaker and writer

Robert Ronald Maslyn Williams (20 February 1911 – 11 August 1999) was an Australian documentary filmmaker and writer.

He was born in England and moved to Australia in the 1920s, where he grew up in the New England and Southern Highlands districts of New South Wales. He studied at the Conservatorium of Music in Sydney and worked as a journalist before going into filmmaking.

In 1940, he joined the Official War Film and Photographic Unit as a writer-producer and served under Frank Hurley in the Middle East. He worked for the Australian Information Bureau in New York in 1945 and the Canadian Film Board in 1946.

In 1962 he left filmmaking and became a writer.

== Select filmography ==
- Mike and Stefani (1952)
- New Guinea Patrol

== Selected works ==
=== Nonfiction ===
- Williams, Maslyn (1964), Stone Age island : seven years in New Guinea, Collins
- Williams, Maslyn (1965), Five Journeys from Jakarta inside Sukarno's Indonesia, New York W. Morrow
- Williams, Maslyn (1967), The East is Red, Collins
- Williams, Maslyn (1988), His Mother's Country, Melbourne University Press, ISBN 978-0-522-84361-3

=== Novels ===
- Williams, Maslyn (1967), The Far Side of the Sky : a novel, F.W. Cheshire
- Williams, Maslyn (1971), The Benefactors : a novel of New Guinean conquest, Angus and Robertson (U.K.) Ltd, ISBN 978-0-09-130911-4
- Williams, Maslyn (1974), Florence Copley of Romney, Collins, ISBN 978-0-00-221587-9
- Williams, Maslyn (1982), The Temple, Alternative Publishing Co-operative, ISBN 978-0-909188-64-1
