= The Siege of Pinchgut =

1959 film

- Original UK quad format film poster
- Directed by: Harry Watt
- Written by: Jon Cleary; Alexander Baron; Harry Watt
- Based on: Story by Inman Hunter; Lee Robinson
- Produced by: Michael Balcon
- Starring: Aldo Ray; Heather Sears
- Cinematography: Gordon Dines
- Edited by: Gordon Stone
- Music by: Kenneth V. Jones
- Production company: Ealing Studios
- Distributed by: ABPC
- Release dates: 2 July 1959 (Berlin Film Festival); August 1959 (UK)
- Running time: 104 minutes
- Country: United Kingdom
- Language: English
- Budget: more than £200,000
- Box office: 338,711 admissions (France)

The Siege of Pinchgut (released in the US as Four Desperate Men) is a 1959 British thriller filmed on location in Sydney, Australia, and directed by Harry Watt. It was the last film produced by Ealing Studios, and was entered into the 9th Berlin International Film Festival where it was nominated for the Golden Bear Award.

== Plot ==
An ambulance drives through Sydney, having been hijacked by escaped convict Matt Kirk and his three accomplices: Matt's brother Johnny, Italian Luke and Bert. The four men manage to avoid detection at Sydney Hospital and head out through Sydney Harbour in a purchased vessel, intending to go north. However, the boat breaks down before they can get through the Sydney Heads and the men decide to take refuge in Fort Denison (also known as Pinchgut), unaware it is occupied by caretaker Pat Fulton, his wife and daughter Ann.

Matt's gang take the Fultons hostage and decide to wait until the following night before leaving again. A boatload of tourists arrives, but Pat manages to act as if everything is normal. However, when a police officer, Constable Macey, visits the fort bringing some milk, Ann screams for help and the authorities are alerted to the gang's presence.

A siege situation results, with the police led by Superintendent Hanna. Matt is initially reluctant to hurt anyone but becomes less stable after Johnny is shot and injured by Macey. Bert, an ex-naval gunner, realises the gun on Fort Denison could be fired at a nearby munitions ship in the harbour and cause tremendous damage similar to the Bombay Explosion of 1944. However, shells for the gun are locked behind three heavy doors at the bottom of the fort, which need to be laboriously prised open. Matt demands a retrial for his conviction in exchange for not firing the gun.

The police order an evacuation of harbourside suburbs and the stealthy unloading of the munitions boat. They position snipers around the fort as they try to negotiate a peaceful surrender. Johnny starts to develop feelings towards Ann and suggests they surrender, but Matt refuses. Luke is shot dead by the snipers, and a sailor on the munitions ship is trapped under some crates. Matt and Bert manage to retrieve the ammunition and are in the process of transferring it to the gun when Bert is shot and killed. Matt loads the gun and prepares to fire when Johnny reveals that he has disabled the firing pin. A furious Matt tries to kill Johnny. Hanna leads a squad of police as they raid the island; Matt is killed. Johnny is arrested and taken away, but not before Pat promises to speak up for him.

== Cast ==
- Aldo Ray as Matt Kirk
- Heather Sears as Ann Fulton
- Neil McCallum as Johnny Kirk
- Victor Maddern as Bert
- Carlo Giustini as Luke (as Carlo Justini)
- Alan Tilvern as Superintendent Hanna
- Barbara Mullen as Mrs Fulton
- Gerry Duggan as Pat Fulton
- Kenneth J. Warren as Police Commissioner (as Kenneth Warren)
- Grant Taylor as Constable Macey
- Deryck Barnes as Sergeant Drake (as Derek Barnes)
- Richard Vernon as Under Secretary
- Ewan MacDuff as Naval Captain
- Martin Boddey as Brigadier
- Barry Foster as Charlie Patterson (uncredited)
- Glyn Houston as Navy Rating (uncredited)
- George Woodbridge as Newspaper Editor (uncredited)

== Saturday to Monday ==
The story was written by Australian filmmaker Lee Robinson and British editor Inman Hunter in 1949 when both were working in Sydney at the Film Division of the Department of the Interior. According to one account, the original idea began with Hunter, who saw Fort Denison while travelling on the Sydney ferry shortly after arriving in Australia, and thought it would make a perfect location for a film. Lee Robinson had worked as an anti-aircraft gunner on Denison in the early days of the war, and together they developed a story about two German POWs who escape and take over Fort Denison, then hold Sydney to ransom by threatening to fire a gun there on a munitions ship.

According to Robinson, he came up with the idea in 1947 when he would see posters of German and Italian POWs who were still at large in Australia. The original story was set in 1947 and concern Germans, one of whom spoke English and the other one who didn't, who were trying to escape to Argentina. They committed a crime and wound up at Pinchgut. They used the guns "for pardon onto a ship that was leaving two nights later to South America...also two men were trained artillerymen. You know, they had been in the German army in artillery. So they knew how to handle the gun, they knew what they could do with it, and they had no love for the people. As far as they were concerned, this was still the enemy."

In 1950 Robinson and Hunter announced the film would go into production the following year under the name Saturday to Monday, with both intending to direct. The following year it was announced the film would be the first of three made by a new company, One World Film Productions. The story would be about two escaping prisoners who board a tourist launch at Fort Macquarie and inspect Pinchgut. They remain behind after other tourists have gone and imprison a soldier who is there to guard some army equipment left behind after the war. They commence a siege, threatening to fire an anti-aircraft gun at the city. The second film would be about the pearling industry and the third would be set in Kosciuszko National Park. (Robinson says Harry Watt, while making Eureka Stockade was keep to help Robinson make a film about Aboriginals called The Brimming Billabong. The Brimming Billanbong and the Kosciuszko film were never made, but Robinson did make a film set in the pearling industry, King of the Coral Sea.)

However although they secured some backing Robinson and Hunter were unable to get the necessary finance, and their script was sold to Ealing Studios.

== Ealing Studios ==
Ealing Studios, under the management of Michael Balcoln, had made a number of films in Australia, notably The Overlanders, Eurkeka Stockade, Bitter Springs and The Shiralee. The first two of these had been directed by Harry Watt, who would direct The Siege of Pinchgut.

Watt had resigned from Ealing in 1955 to work for Granada Television, but had not enjoyed the experience and asked to return to Ealing after eighteen months. Watt came across the script for Saturday to Monday and became enthusiastic about its possibilities. It was the only one of Watt's three Australian films made without a historical basis and was a deliberate attempt on the director's part to create a commercially successful film. "I determined on my return to film to make a box-office success," he wrote. "This was the first time I had thought like this because before that I had just made pictures, and if they were a success, so much the better." There was a mini-boom of foreign productions in Australia in the late 1950s inspired by the success of Smiley and The Shiralee.

Watt went to Australia in February 1958 to begin pre production on the project, then called The Siege. Watt said that month he had a 60 page treatment which he wanted to spend the next two-three months turning into a full script. "I largely walk around, listening to how people talk, and learning how Australians should behave and feel," he said.

Watt travelled out to Fort Denison and was "delighted with it. It's a wonderful location, from every angle you turn."

Watt felt that Sydney had not changed too much in the 12 years he was last in the city. He felt the people had become friendlier and less insular, and that the city was "spreading all over the place... like lave" and "I am still enormously struck by the number of good looking girls."

Watt said the Robinson-Hunter story "was a hell of a good idea. But it now has a completely different set of characters." He changed the story so it was no longer about a German POW, but an escaped convict fighting to prove his innocence to an uncaring judicial system.

Watt said the story "is basically a character study of a man, an escaped convict with a persecution complex. But it is also an action picture... a thriller. I have always wanted to make a film of this modern city. But it has to appeal to the world; otherwise it goes on the shelf, and I feel The Siege will appeal to America and Britain and Europe."

Lee Robinson later said "Harry had a bug about some bloke in England who'd been sent to gaol, and years later it'd been proven that he was innocent... And he made these two fellas local fellas who in effect were going to use the gun on their own people, to get what they wanted - whatever it was. And I didn't find that acceptable. But it was acceptable that two escaped strong Nazis would fire a gun, either at local shipping or local people."

He then returned to Britain but returned months later to begin the film.

The script was assigned to British writer Alexander Baron, who brought in his friend, Australian novelist Jon Cleary, to help him with the dialogue. This was done despite reservations of Michael Balcon who worried that Cleary's involvement would make the script "too Australian".

Despite Cleary's international reputation, he is an Australian which will mean that the picture may be too Australian in its outlook, whereas I was relying on the fact that you have a fair knowledge of Australia and its background, and the international aspects might be better protected by our working with a British writer.

Filmink later argued "the entire script of Pinchgut is a perfect example of how to take a terrifically suspenseful idea and suck all the tension out of it. "

== Casting ==
Watt would have preferred to make the film with unknowns but Ealing had just been taken over by Associated British which insisted on casting a name actor in the lead role of Matt Kirk. American Aldo Ray was selected. This meant the nationality of Matt and his brother Johnny was changed to American. (In January 1959 Hedda Hopper reported that Stewart Granger turned down $200,000 to make The Siege in Australia because his mother was visiting from England.)

The rest of the key cast were imported, with only supporting roles given to Australians. Heather Sears and Barbara Mullins came from England; Jerry Duggan was an Irishman who had recently settled in Australia. Neil McCallum was Canadian and Carlo Justini came from Italy. Watt said "I'm making it a sort of international cast because I think that is right now for Australia." It was reported that more than 30 Australians would have speaking parts. It was later argued "it’s remarkable that a studio which historically prided itself on authenticity as much as Ealing took such an inauthentic approach to casting."

== Filming ==
Filming began on 30 November 1958 under the title The Siege at Fort Denison. The Maritime Services Board picked that day to start repairs on the Martello round tower on the fort, causing "a real mess up" according to the Sydney Morning Herald. Shooting took place on the fort for three weeks.

Over sixty technicians were imported from Britain to make the movie, although production facilities were provided by a local company, Southern International Productions, which had been established by Lee Robinson.

"Marvellous setting, this fort" said associate producer Eric Williams. "Ideal for a film - it has a real medieval touch."

The Australian National Line agreed to anchor a freighter in Farm Cove for the filmmakers to depict an ammunition boat.

Scenes were shot in police headquarters in Philip Street, the Town Hall clock, Bondi beach. Watt said in the scenes where the public was warned about the attack "no one takes any notice of it, of course. It's real Sydney."

Ealing Studios were in flux during production. They had just completed six films for MGM – including the Australian-set The Shiralee (1957) – before moving over to Associated British Picture Corporation at Elstree. The association would prove to be an unhappy one and this film wound up being the last one ever made under the Ealing banner.

In November 1958 Michael Balcon announced he was leaving Ealing although he said he would stay until June to see Pinchgut through to completion. Soon after filming began, Associated British announced they no longer wished to continue Ealing's production programme. Jon Cleary says this hurt morale and that Watt's "heart wasn't in it" when making the movie. Production was also held up when Aldo Ray tore a leg muscle while jumping into a boat.

In December the unit shifted to London for studio work at Elstree.

== UK Reception ==
The film was entered in the 1959 Berlin Film Festival and released in the UK and Australia. Although aged almost 50, Gerry Duggan was nominated for the BAFTA Film Award for Newcomer to Leading Film Roles in 1960 for his role as Pat Fulton. He lost to the 13-year-old Hayley Mills in Tiger Bay.

=== Critical ===
In England The Guardian said it had "a story with depth and real life which sometimes holds up the pace of what must succeed as a thriller."

Variety said:

Within the first couple of minutes, even before the credit titles, an atmosphere of considerable tension is created, but suspense at that pace and standard is hard to maintain.. Nevertheless Siege of Pinchgut is a lively action pic with prospects of brisk b.o. returns. In the U.S., the star billing of Aldo Ray should help some... The siege of the island has its complement of suspense - but not to compare with original getaway scenes... Ray’s virile and vigorous portrayal is right for the role: Victor Maddern turns in another fine part as one of his friends. Heather Sears, as the caretaker’s daughter, gives a completely negative performance. The kid brother role is ably filled by Neil McCallum. Carlo Justini makes an acceptable showing as the fourth fugitive. Gerry Duggan and Barbara Mullen hit the right note of restrained fear as the girl’s parents.

Sight and Sound wrote "some effective surface detail but not much emotional conviction."

Kinematograph Weekly wrote "The plot holds no secrets, but what it lacks in finesse it gains in robustness. Widely varied characters, adequately portrayed... are effectively deployed, while terrific initial momentum carries it through poplar channels to a gripping, neatly turned climax. Authentic backgrounds, finely photographed, strengthen conviction and heighten atmosphere."

=== Australian reception ===
The film was not released in Australia until July 1960. The Sydney Morning Herald said "as a thriller, it is not half as bad as has been painted.". The Age said Watt was "seen at his best and his worst in this piece of tough suspense. His best is the real life location work. His worst is the fictional character studies and their melodrama."

=== Box office ===
In October 1959 Kinematograph Weekly reported the film "just hasn't registered [at the box office] and many think one of the causes is a poor title. They're probably right for I muyst confess Pinchgut conveyed nothing to me. I know it takes more than an attractive label to sell a film, but a vague one can undoubtedly be a handicap."

In April 1960 Variety reported the film "failed to pull biz at Embassy, Sydney, and was yanked pronto."

The film was not a success at the box office and turned out to be not only the last movie made by Ealing, but the last adult feature film Watt ever directed.

=== Later reputation ===
Charles Barr, Ealing historian, later wrote:

As with other honourable Ealing films that recoil from violence (Secret People), it’s hard to express criticism in summary terms without appearing callously pro-violence; but I feel confident in saying that Pinchgut’s attitude to its violence is very confused, and that the confusion is typical of the weak side of fifties Ealing. The film gives to its police and politicians a moral endorsement which they have not earned. Appropriately, the final image of any Ealing film is of a return to security and the embrace of the law.

According to film historians Brian Adams and Graham Shirley:

The final result is a strange hybrid; Aldo Ray is disastrously miscast and emotions are synthetically overwrought. These contrast unfavourably with the assured documentary-style handling of the exterior locations, particularly Watt’s handling of the mass evacuation of harbourside suburbs and the placing of sharpshooters on the city’s surrounding vantage points as Ray threatens to use Pinchgut’s defence armoury to blow up the waterfront. Away from the urgency of the threatened catastrophe, the social drowsiness of Sydney in the 1950s is evoked with accuracy.

However, the film's reputation has risen in recent years: Quentin Tarantino screened it at the Quentin Tarantino Film Festival in Texas, and in 2006 it was restored by the National Film and Sound Archive. It has historical value, depicting postwar Sydney, its harbour foreshore and the remains of the Fort Macquarie Tram Depot which was being demolished for construction of the Sydney Opera House.
