= Crocodile Hunters =

- Directed by: Lee Robinson
- Produced by: Stanley Hawes
- Narrated by: Harold Gary
- Cinematography: Frank Bagnall
- Music by: Willy Redstone
- Production company: Australian National Film Board
- Release date: 1949
- Running time: 10 minutes
- Country: Australia
- Language: English

Crocodile Hunters is a 1949 Australian documentary directed by Lee Robinson about both Aboriginal and professional crocodile hunters in the Northern Territory of Australia. The film has since been used as a study text for Australian secondary schools.
