= Namatjira the Painter =

- Directed by: Lee Robinson
- Produced by: Ralph Foster
- Cinematography: Axel Poignant
- Production company: Australian National Film Board
- Release date: 1947
- Running time: 22 mins
- Country: Australia
- Language: English
- Budget: £3,000

Namatjira the Painter is a 1947 documentary about the artist, Albert Namatjira. It deals with his background, his relationship with Rex Battarbee and how he learned to paint.

== Production ==
The film was among the first productions of the Australian National Film Board, later known as Film Australia. Ralph Foster served as the Board’s first appointed Film.

Lee Robinson joined the Board after leaving the army and wrote a treatment for the documentary in January 1946. As no one else had directing experience, he was given the role. Robinson received basic advice on directing from Harry Watt, then in Australia shooting The Overlanders.

Filming took around five months in mid 1946 in the Northern Territory, finishing in August, and was edited in Ralph Foster's flat. The movie was completed after Stanley Hawes became head of the film board.

== Reception ==
The film was widely screened in cinemas as a support feature. It was re-released in 1974 with new narration.

Namatjira later had a cameo as himself in Robinson's first film as director, The Phantom Stockman.
