= Bush Policeman =

1953 film by Lee Robinson

- Directed by: Lee Robinson
- Production company: Commonwealth Film Unit
- Release date: March 1953
- Running time: 10 minutes
- Country: Australia
- Language: English

Bush Policemen is a 10-minute Australian documentary about the work done by a policeman in the Australian Outback. It was released to cinemas as a supporting feature. Robinson said it was "really the story of a river operating policeman."

It was directed by Lee Robinson who later made a drama feature film set in the same milieu, Dust in the Sun.
