= Inman Hunter =

British film editor

- Born: Edward Inman Hunter; 25 August 1914; Lincolnshire, England, UK
- Died: 1 July 1986 (aged 71); Richmond, Surrey, England, UK
- Other names: E. M. Inman Hunter; E. M. Hunter
- Occupation: film and television editor
- Years active: 1938-1972

Inman Hunter (25 August 1914 – July 1986) was a British film editor who worked in both Australia and England from 1938 to 1969.

== Career ==
His first film editing project was for Reginald Denham's 1938 crime thriller Queen of Crime. He then went to Australia in 1945 to work on the 1946 film The Overlanders. He returned to Australia in 1946 on a special Halifax bomber, a trip that achieved much publicity at the time, and worked at Film Australia. He then worked in Australian film production for several years, also providing the original story for the 1959 film The Siege of Pinchgut.

Hunter later returned to England, where he worked mainly in television, editing until 1969. He also served as supervising editor on the 1949 film Alice in Wonderland.

== Partial filmography ==
=== Film ===
- Secret of Stamboul (1936)
- Kate Plus Ten (1938)
- Dreaming (1945)
- The Overlanders (1946)
- The Monkey's Paw (1948)
- Alice in Wonderland (1949)
- Mike and Stefani (1952)
- Little Red Monkey (1955)
- Children Galore (1955)

=== Television ===
- A Matter of Manners (1951)
- The Adventures of Robin Hood (1956–58)
- The New Adventures of Charlie Chan (1958)
- Dial 999 (1958–59)
- Interpol Calling (1960)
- The Golden Ring - The Making of Solti's "Ring" (BBC/Austrian Television documentary) (1965)
- The Saint (1966–68)
- Journey to the Unknown (1968–69)
- The Champions (1969)

=== Screenwriter ===
- The Siege of Pinchgut (1959) – original story
