= King of the Coral Sea =

- Directed by: Lee Robinson
- Written by: Lee Robinson; Chips Rafferty
- Produced by: Chips Rafferty; Lee Robinson (uncredited)
- Starring: Chips Rafferty; Charles Tingwell; Rod Taylor
- Cinematography: Ross Wood; Noel Monkman (underwater photography)
- Edited by: Alex Ezard
- Music by: Wilbur Sampson
- Production company: Southern International Productions
- Distributed by: British Empire Films
- Release date: 17 July 1954 (Australia)
- Running time: 85 mins
- Country: Australia
- Language: English
- Budget: £23,862
- Box office: £34,000 (England) £26,000 (Australia)

King of the Coral Sea is a 1954 Australian film directed by Lee Robinson and starring Chips Rafferty and Charles Tingwell. It was written by Robinson and Rafferty, and was shot on location on Thursday Island. It was one of the most commercially successful Australian films of the 1950s and was Rod Taylor's film debut.

== Synopsis ==
A body is found floating in the Torres Strait and pearler Ted King is asked to investigate. He discovers the murder is connected to a people smuggling ring and involves one of his men, Yusep. He is helped by Peter Merriman, the playboy owner of King's company who romances King's daughter Rusty. Yusep kidnaps Rusty but Merriman and King rescue her.

== Cast ==
- Chips Rafferty as Ted King
- Charles Tingwell as Peter Merriman
- Ilma Adey as Rusty King
- Rod Taylor as Jake Janiero
- Lloyd Berrell as Yusep
- Reg Lye as Grundy
- Charles Peverill as Sergeant Charlie Wright
- Frances Chin Soon as Serena

== Production ==
Financed was raised following the success of The Phantom Stockman.

Lee Robinson had previously made a documentary on the pearling industry, The Pearlers (1949). All Australian slang was removed from the script to ensure it would not be confusing for international audiences. The shoot took place from June to October 1953.

=== Casting ===
The supporting cast included Rod Taylor in his film debut. He played an American who elected to stay on in Australia after World War II, a character Robinson created with the aim of making the film appealing to the international market. Taylor, Robinson, Rafferty, Charles Tingwell and Lloyd Berrell all knew each other from working in Sydney radio. Also featured in the cast were Ilma Adey, a model and cabaret entertainer without any previous acting experience, and Frances Chin Soon, a local nurse from Thursday Island.

=== Underwater photography ===
The film was shot almost entirely on location on Thursday Island, except for the underwater footage, which was filmed off Green Island. Noel Monkman was primarily responsible for this. The filming was unique as the cameraman and the actors dived with a rare scuba known as the Lawson Lung. It was a patent violation of the Cousteau-Gagnan patented Aqua Lung. It had a unique appearance, which came from the tank being worn on the diver's back, with the regulator worn on the chest. The Lawson Lung was made in Sydney in small numbers, because getting scuba gear in Australia was very difficult at the time. Rafferty dived in an open British made Heinke helmet as well as using the Lawson Lung towards the end of the film. Thursday Island was known for its pearl shells, which were collected for jewelry and buttons. The film was noted for the documentation of pearl shell divers and the luggers they sailed in.

== Release ==
The film was originally entitled King of the Arafura but was retitled King of the Coral Sea as it was felt the Coral Sea was a better known sea than the Arafura. The world premiere was held on Thursday Island on 17 July 1954, with a simultaneous screening in Melbourne. The film enjoyed a successful release and Robinson estimated it tripled its costs within three months. A "Queen of the Coral Sea" competition was held to promote the movie.

== Reception ==
The Monthly Film Bulletin wrote: "This Australian adventure story, variable and uneven in quality, is boisterous and uninhibited; in its unsophisticated way it is often quite diverting."

Kine Weekly wrote: "The picture takes a little time to warm up, but superb vistas sustain interest until the battle between the law abiding and the lawless factions has joined. Chips Rafferty has an easy way with him as Ted, Charles Tingwell is a manly Peter, Alma Adey looks delightful in her Bikini as Rusty, and Reginald Lye registers as the treacherous Grundy."
