= Lee Robinson (director) =

Australian film director

- Born: 22 February 1923; Petersham, New South Wales, Australia
- Died: 22 September 2003 (aged 80); Sydney, New South Wales, Australia
- Occupations: Producer; director; screenwriter; studio executive

Lee Robinson OAM (22 February 1923 – 22 September 2003) was an Australian producer, director and screenwriter who was Australia's most prolific filmmaker of the 1950s and part of the creative team that produced the late 1960s international hit television series Skippy the Bush Kangaroo.

== Biography ==
Robinson was born in Petersham, New South Wales and left school aged 12. He worked at the Daily Telegraph as a copy boy, and wrote short stories prior to the war. He first entered film as a member of the Australian Army History Unit where he filmed Australian troops in Rabaul and East Timor. His commanding officer in the History Unit was the author and screenwriter Jon Cleary.

After the war he was going to work for the ABC as a scriptwriter when he received an offer to join the Australian Information Service film unit (later Film Australia) where he directed a film on Albert Namatjira called Namatjira the Painter (1946). Robinson made several films in the Northern Territory such as Outback Patrol, The Pearlers and Crocodile Hunters as well as a short film with actors in a studio called Double Trouble (1951). The high quality and Australian subject matter of these films led them to be released theatrically as support for main features. He developed a film called Saturday to Monday but was unable to secure finance - he later sold the script to Ealing who filmed it as The Siege of Pinchgut.

=== Association with Chips Rafferty ===
Robinson had known actor Chips Rafferty from writing radio serials for him. Together with George Heath they formed a company called Platypus Productions with the goal of producing Australian films that Robinson would direct and Rafferty could appear in. The Australian Government put a £10,000 limit on any non-essential Australian company, forcing them to make their first film The Phantom Stockman (1953) for that amount. The movie was a success, launching the career of Robinson discovery Victoria Shaw and Robinson found out that modestly made films with good advertising made their money back. He also felt that a film with an unconventional setting should have a conventional story line.

Rafferty and Robinson then formed a new company, Southern International Productions, and made the popular King of the Coral Sea (1954), which marked the feature film debut of Rod Taylor. This was followed by Walk into Paradise (1956), an Australian/French international co-production which American showman Joseph E. Levine acquired for American release and shrewdly retitled Walk into Hell. The film became the most successful Australian film up to that time.

However later Robinson-Rafferty collaborations were unsuccessful such as Dust in the Sun. and The Stowaway.

In 1959, he was also asked to film a series of Sydney rock concerts, later released as Rock 'n' Roll, which today provides a rare record of early Australian rock performers.

He became involved with Waratah Productions making Adventure Unlimited.

=== Fauna Productions ===
With feature film production drying up, Robinson moved from directing and writing to producing. In 1966 he formed Fauna Productions with John McCallum to produce the television series Skippy the Bush Kangaroo. Robinson had been advised that a children's show would sell well globally. Robinson was inspired by Flipper, changing the dolphin into a kangaroo. The series was filmed in colour before Australia had colour television. Robinson directed a feature film of the series called The Intruders (1969) or Skippy and the Intruders.

Throughout the 1970s, he concentrated on television production. In the early 1980s, he returned to feature films, producing two films based on the activities of Z Special Unit during World War II.

== Personal life ==
Robinson and his wife, Gwenyth, remained together from their marriage in 1940 until her death in 1968. They had five children.

He was awarded the Medal of the Order of Australia (OAM) in the 1985 Australia Day Honours for "service to the Australian film and television industry".

== Quotes ==
"To put an Australian tag on it [an Australian feature film] was the worst thing you could do."

== Feature films ==
- The Phantom Stockman (1953) (director, writer)
- King of the Coral Sea (1954) (director, writer)
- Walk into Paradise (1956) (director, writer)
- Dust in the Sun (1958) (director, writer)
- The Stowaway (1958) (director, producer, writer)
- The Restless and the Damned (1959) (producer)
- Hula, Hula (1959) – French-Italian film
- The Intruders (1969) (director, producer, writer)
- Attack Force Z (1981) (producer)
- The Highest Honor (1983) (producer)

== Documentaries ==
- Darwin Gateway to Australia (1946)
- Namatjira the Painter (1947)
- The Pearlers (1949)
- Problem Town (1949) – a documentary about Broome that was shot but not released due to its subject matter
- Crocodile Hunters (1949)
- Flight Plan (1950)
- Double Trouble (1951)
- Outback Patrol (1952)
- Bush Policeman (1953)
- The Power Makers (1957)
- Bring Out a Briton (1958)
- Rock 'n' Roll (1959)
- Australia Today – the District Commissioner (1963)
- The Dawn Fraser Story (1964)

== Radio ==
- Chips (1952)
- The Winner (1952) – series starring boxer Tommy Burns
- The Bill Morris Story (1953)

== Television ==
- High Adventure (1957–58) – episodes "Australian Outback", "Uncontrolled Territory", "Dewline"
- Machete (1960) – pilot for CBS series not picked up shot in Tahiti for Gil Ralston
- Adventure Unlimited (1965, filmed 1963) (ten episodes)
- Skippy the Bush Kangaroo (1968–71)
- Barrier Reef (1971–72)
- Boney (1972–73)
- Shannon's Mob (1975–76)
- Bailey's Bird (1979) (TV series)

== Short stories ==
- Square Off (1944)
- Railroad Out (1945)
- Suffer Little Children (1946)
