= Grant Taylor (actor) =

Australian actor (1917–1971)

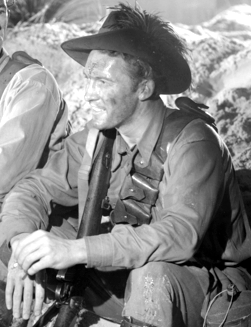
- Taylor in Forty Thousand Horsemen (1940)
- Born: Ronald Grant Taylor; 6 December 1917; Newcastle upon Tyne, England
- Died: 26 January 1971; London, England
- Occupation: Actor
- Spouses: Margaret Haslett (m. 1941; div. 1946) Jean Bullen (m. 1947; died 1956) Beth Revenna (m. 1958; died 1971)
- Children: Kit; Duncan

Ronald Grant Taylor (6 December 1917 – 26 January 1971) was an English-Australian actor best known as the abrasive General Henderson in the Gerry Anderson science fiction series UFO and for his lead role in Forty Thousand Horsemen (1940).

== Early life ==
Taylor was born in Newcastle upon Tyne in England, but moved to Australia with his parents as a child. For a time he worked as a professional boxer in Melbourne under the name of Lance Matheson. According to a later newspaper report, he had 70 bouts, lost eight and drew 11. He reportedly also served in the Merchant Marine.

=== Acting debut ===
Cinesound Productions were looking for someone with wrestling skills to play the part of a gorilla in Gone to the Dogs (1939), so Taylor auditioned. He did not get the part but met Alec Kellaway who persuaded him to join Cinesound's Talent School.

Ken G. Hall said that one of the problems of the Australian industry of this time was they "were consistently short of trained juveniles and ingenues". Cinesound in particular had a great deal of trouble finding male romantic leads. They either left to work in radio (Dick Fair), returned overseas (John Longden, Billy Rayes), left for overseas (Frank Leighton), or died (Brian Abbot). Cinesound Talent School was partly founded with an intention to rectify this.

Taylor's physique, good looks and charm saw Ken G. Hall cast him as the juvenile lead in Dad Rudd, M.P. (1940) opposite Yvonne East. The Sydney Truth later wrote:

Taylor... scored in the scenes of the flood, where, clad in oilskins, he shouted instructions above the torrent of the waters. He was happier in the romantic finale, too, than Australian leading men are wont to be. But lighting did not flatter his appearance, nor microphone his voice, in some of the early scenes.

=== Forty Thousand Horsemen and stardom ===
Taylor was then selected by Charles Chauvel to play the lead role of 'Red' Gallagher in the war film Forty Thousand Horsemen (1940). Chauvel had cast Errol Flynn in his first lead role. His wife Elsa described Taylor as like "a big kid" on the set. Charles Chauvel said "I consider Grant Taylor by far the best screen lead here." Taylor was paid £15 a week. Filmink called him "good looking, charismatic and masculine, with a terrific physique, relaxed demeanour and confidence."

This movie was a massive international success and a Hollywood or English career beckoned, but Taylor elected to stay in Australia. Career-wise it proved to be a bad decision, as film production in Australia declined sharply with the advent of World War II and Taylor was unable to follow up his success immediately. However, according to one historian, his "radio career advanced rapidly, particularly in Sydney where he not only turned in some memorable performances but earned himself a reputation as one of the wild and colourful characters of the 1940s and 50s."

=== Army service ===
In April 1941 Taylor reportedly relocated from Sydney to his home in Melbourne, where it was announced he would focus on radio work. Taylor had been enlisted in the Australian Military Forces (the militia) at Randwick on 19 August 1940 (service number NN57548) but not called to full time service until December 1941. Taylor transferred to the Australian Imperial Force (AIF) Australian Army on 7 October 1942, at East Prahran (and therefore available for service overseas) (service number VX110733). He had served in various units including as a stretcher bearer in a Field Ambulance and as a military policeman, though his entertainment career was recognised with a posting to the Army Amenities Unit, in Sydney, and the Detachment No 8 Army Entertainment Unit, alongside singer Smoky Dawson. During the course of the war, Taylor's duties would include entertaining troops in New Guinea, Borneo and adjoining islands.

Taylor was also given leave to appear in some propaganda short films, such as While There is Still Time (1942), 100,000 Cobbers (1942), Another Threshold (1942) and South West Pacific (1943). Reviewing Cobbers Filmink wrote Taylor and co star Shirley Ann Richards "have charisma to burn and chemistry off the charts."

Taylor was allowed to appear in the feature The Rats of Tobruk (1944), which reunited him with Chauvel and Chips Rafferty.

The last film Taylor appeared in during his army service was Australia Is Like This (1945). However, he was also in a stage production, A Soldier for Christmas at the Minerva Theatre, in King's Cross, Sydney. In 1945, it was announced that he would star in a Chauvel film titled Green Mountain, but by the time the movie was actually made (as Sons of Matthew, released in 1949), he did not appear in it.

Taylor was discharged from the Army on 26 February 1946, with the rank of private; his final unit was officially the 2/3 Anti-Tank Regiment. In March 1946 it was reported he had returned from a final posting, in Borneo, and would recommence his acting career on ABC's Press Gang.

== Post-War career ==
After the war Taylor was unable to consolidate his position as a film star, and saw the majority of leading man roles go instead to actors such as Charles Tingwell and Chips Rafferty. Filmink magazine later wrote a profile on the actor which asked " Why did Taylor go from a leading man to support player in such a short period of time? Did he deteriorate physically too much? Look too old? (He was only around 30.) Difficult to deal with? Did he charge too much money?"

However he remained busy as a character actor, and in radio and theatre. A review of a performance he gave in The Paragon in 1948 called him "a virile figure in the Clark Gable tradition, but is over-inclined to inflate his chest and growl menacingly through his teeth, a picturesque characteristic, but one which does not always lend itself to clarity of enunciation."

He was a sergeant in Eureka Stockade (1949) – Rafferty had the leading role – and played a thug in The Kangaroo Kid (1950). He took part in the 1951 re-enactment of Sir Charles Sturt's journey down the Murrimbidgee River, playing Sturt – a film of this was made, called Inland with Sturt (1951). He had a role in another short, Far West Story (1952) then returned to lead roles when he played the title part in Captain Thunderbolt (1953). His co star in that film was Charles Tingwell who said "Grant was a tough man, yet he was very gentle. He was not one to get close to people, but he was loved by most in the acting profession."

Taylor was cast in a support role in a Hollywood film shot in Fiji, His Majesty O'Keefe (1954). The director, Byron Haskin, liked Taylor's performance and used him again as a pirate in Long John Silver, and its television spinoff, The Adventures of Long John Silver. His son Kit played Jim Hawkins. In 1954 he said his main hobbies were "a book and a bottle."

Taylor was in two big stage hits, Dial M for Murder and Teahouse of the August Moon. In the late 1950s he appeared in several productions for the Elizabethan Theatre Trust, including The Slaughter of St Teresa's Day.

In 1959 Taylor appeared in a brief role in Stanley Kramer's On the Beach. He played a mystery man in Smiley Gets a Gun (1958), and a policeman in The Siege of Pinchgut (1959). He was kicked in the head filming a brawl while making Smiley Gets a Gun and had to take off a number of days. He toured with a production of Fire on the Wind.

Taylor had several roles in Whiplash (1960–61). He then focused on theatre, touring the country in Two for the Seesaw (one review called him "an actor of considerable strength and presence"), The Pleasure of His Company (1960), Bye Bye Birdie (1961), and Woman in a Dressing Gown (1962–63). In April 1963, John McCallum, head of JC Williamsons, said Taylor was one of three Australian actors who could "hold an audience in a starring part" in Australian theatre (the others were Kevin Colson and Jill Perryman).

=== Australian television ===
Taylor made his live TV debut in Funnel Web (1962) for the ABC, playing a murderer. The Sydney Morning Herald called his performance "easy-limbed, masterful". He had good roles in the TV plays Jenny (1962), Flowering Cherry (1963), The Right Thing (1964), and The One That Got Away (1964). In 1964 he appeared in the ABC-TV children's adventure serial The Stranger, Australia's first locally produced science fiction TV series, which was also sold to the BBC. He was in an episode of Adventure Unlimited filmed in 1963.

== Return to the UK ==
Returning to the United Kingdom in early 1963, Taylor worked on the long-running medical drama Emergency Ward 10. This led to plenty of work in character roles, from Anglia TV's soap opera Weavers Green (where Taylor had a regular part) to The Avengers, The Troubleshooters and several Lew Grade-backed projects including The Champions. He also appeared in a British TV adaptation of Summer of the Seventeenth Doll (1964).

He appeared in a production of Twelve Angry Men on the West End and had a regular role in the TV series Weavers Green (1966) He was a Scots border chieftain in the BBC's 1968 colour costume drama The Borderers.

A high-profile role for him was in the Gerry Anderson science fiction series UFO, where he played sometime-ally, sometime-antagonist General Henderson. His last appearance in the series was in the penultimate episode 'Mindbender', where he also appears as himself, acting the role of Henderson in the studio.

Taylor appeared in the big-screen adaptation of Quatermass and the Pit (1967) and in Calamity the Cow (1967) (with Phil Collins).

== Personal life ==
In June 1941 Taylor married Margaret Josephine Haslett at St Joseph's Church, Malvern. (They were engaged in May.) Shortly afterwards her mother in law moved in with them. They had one child, Christopher John (later known as Kit) born in April 1942. Taylor went to Sydney in early 1942 to make a recruiting film and says when he returned his wife had moved out. He did not see her again until 1945, when she said she had no intention to return to him. Taylor was granted a divorce in 1946 with custody of their child going to Margaret. Margaret Taylor died in 1952.

In 1947 Taylor married Jean Ebsworth Bullen (née Hosking). It was later revealed that Jean and Taylor had an affair while she was married to her first husband, Walter Bullen; Jean and Bullen divorced in 1945.

Jean and Taylor raised Kit, who became an actor, appearing with his father in Long John Silver. Jean was fatally injured in an accident at their Potts Point home after she fell over on her way back from a party on 23 April 1956. She was taken to hospital and died five days later of bronchial pneumonia, aged 39.

He married a third time, Beth Revenna, and they had a son, Duncan, both in 1958. She died in 1989 in an accident.

Taylor died of cancer in 1971 aged 53.

== Filmography ==
=== Film ===
- Dad Rudd, MP (1940) – Jim Webster
- Forty Thousand Horsemen (1940) – Red Gallagher
- While There is Still Time (1941, Short)
- 100,000 Cobbers (1942, Short)
- Another Threshold (1942, Short)
- South West Pacific (1943, Short) – A.I.F. Soldier
- The Rats of Tobruk (1944) – Bluey Donkin
- Australia is Like This (1944, Short)
- Eureka Stockade (1949) – Sergt. Major Milne
- The Kangaroo Kid (1950) – Phil Romero
- Inland with Sturt (1951, Short) – Captain Charles Sturt
- Far West Story (1951, Short)
- His Majesty O'Keefe (1954) – Lt. Brenner
- Long John Silver (1954) – Patch
- Captain Thunderbolt (1955) – Fred Ward
- Smiley Gets a Gun (1958) – Stiffy
- The Siege of Pinchgut (1959) – Constable Macey
- Turn of the Road (1959) (short)
- On the Beach (1959) – Morgan (Holmes party)
- Quatermass and the Pit (1967) – Police Sergeant Ellis
- Calamity the Cow (1967) – Mr. Grant
- UFO... annientare S.H.A.D.O. stop. Uccidete Straker... (1974) – Gen. James Henderson
- UFO: Prendeteli vivi. (1974) – Gen. James Henderson
- UFO: Distruggete base Luna! (1974) – Gen. James Henderson (final film role)

=== Television ===
- The Adventures of Long John Silver (1956–1957) – Patch
- Whiplash (1961) – John Kerrabee / Horton / John Dundee
- Funnel Web (1962, TV Movie)
- Jenny (1962, TV Movie)
- The Right Thing (1963, TV Movie)
- Flowering Cherry (1963, TV Movie)
- Adventure Unlimited (1963, Ep 6 "The Buffalo Hunters")
- The One That Got Away (1964, TV play)
- The Villains (1964) – Jigger Jones
- The Stranger (1964, TV Series) – Detective Inspector Chisholm
- Emergency Ward 10 (1964) – Jim Singleton
- Summer of the Seventeenth Doll (1964, TV movie part of Thursday Theatre) – Ron Webber
- The Saint (1964, all Australian episode directed by Leslie Norman with Ray Barrett) – Pete Grove
- ITV Play of the Week (1964–1966) "Deep and Crisp and Stolen" (1964) (as an Australian criminal) "Breaking Point" (1965), "Variation on a Theme" (1966) – Defendant / Kurt / Danny / Bluey
- Court Martial (1965) – Col. Hendrys
- The Wednesday Play (1965–1966) – Colonel Lloyd Beacher, Prosecuting Officer / Sergeant Pender - "Pyre for Private James" (1966) - soldier in the jungle with Nick Tate
- Weavers Green (1966, regular for TV series) – Alan Armstrong
- BBC Play of the Month: Lee Oswald Assassin (1966)
- Uncle Charles (1967) – Mr. Heavistone
- Trapped (1967) – Captain Craig
- Champion House (1967) – Harvey Kane
- Escape (1967) – Brady
- The Champions (1968) – General Winters
- Sherlock Holmes (1968) – Neil Gibson
- The Troubleshooters (1967–1969) – Jack Burns / Al Viner
- Mogul (1967) – episodes "Twenty Years is No Time at All", "Thanks for Nothing"
- City '68 (1968) – Mannering
- Armchair Theatre (1968) - "Home Movies"
- The Jazz Age (1968) – Mr. MacDougal
- The Avengers (1968) – Merridon
- The Borderers (1968) – Gilbert
- Judge Dee (1969) – Yang Mai
- ITV Playhouse (1969) – "The Friendly Persuaders" - Sir Terence Norrington
- Detective (1969) – Arthur Kelstern
- Doomwatch (1970) – Colonel Kramer
- UFO (1970–1971) – Gen. James Henderson

== Select theatre credits ==
- Smilin' Through – performed by Cinesound Talent School, September 1940 – with Peter Pagan
- Waste and Waists – musical revue, May 1941
- A Soldier for Christmas – Minerva Theatre, Kings Cross, NSW, January 1945
- Parade of the Stars – special charity performance Minerva Theatre, Kings Cross, Sept 1947
- Woman Bites Dog – New Theatre, Sydney, August 1947
- Love from a Stranger – Minverva Theatre, Kings Cross, Sept 1948
- The Philadelphia Story – Minerva Theatre, Kings Cross, NSW, 4 October 1948
- The Paragon – Minerva Theatre, Kings Cross, NSW, November 1948
- A Kiss for Cinderella – Minerva Theatre, Kings Cross, NSW, December 1948
- The Streets of London – Minerva Theatre, Kings Cross, NSW, 20 December 1948
- The Gioconda Smile – Minerva Theatre, Kings Cross, NSW – March 1949
- Dark Enchantment – Minerva Theatre, Kings Cross – June 1949
- See How they Run – Minerva Theatre, Kings Cross, NSW, August 1949
- Pirates at the Barn – Minerva Theatre, Kings Cross, NSW – December 1949
- The Two Mrs Carrolls – Sydney, Melbourne – June-Sept 1950 – with Elisabeth Bergner
- It All Takes Time – Sydney – June 1952 – Australian play about immigration
- The Hollow by Agatha Christie – Melbourne – August 1953
- Dial M for Murder – Sydney, Brisbane – October 1953
- The Teahouse of the August Moon – Sydney, Newcastle – Dec 1955 to mid 1956
- Double Image – Adelaide, Melbourne – May to Oct 1957
- Curly on the Rack – Elizabethan Theatre, Newtown, NSW – September 1958
- The Slaughter of St Teresa's Day – Elizabethan Theatre, Newtown – March 1959
- The Bastard Country – Elizabethan Theatre, Newtown, 1959
- Man and Superman – Adelaide, Sydney 1959
- Fire on the Wind (The Bastdard Country – Brisbane, Adelaide 1959
- Two for the Seesaw – Jan-March 1960
- The Pleasure of His Company – Sydney, Brisbane, Melbourne – Oct 1960
- Bye Bye Birdie – Adelaide, Sydney – Oct 1961
- Alice in Wonderland – Philip St Theatre, Sydney, Jan 1962 – as Humpty Dumpty
- Shipwreck – Union Theatre, Sydney Feb 1962
- The Break – Union Theatre Sydney March 1962
- A Man for All Seasons – Adelaide, Sydney – Jun 1962
- Woman in a Dressing Gown – Melbourne, Adelaide, 1962–63 – with Googie Withers
- Twelve Angry Men – London stage

== Select radio credits ==
- Capek in Wonderland (in Melbourne)
- Inside Informer (in Melbourne)
- Shadow and Substance (Jul 1941)
- Street Scene (Aug 1941)
- Mr. Smith Goes to Washington (Aug 1941)
- The Squeaker (Dec 1941)
- The Backburns Take Over (Dec 1941) – radio mystery written by Max Afford
- Juno and the Paycock (Dec 1941)
- Gentlemen, the King (Dec 1941)
- Devonshire Cream (Jan 1942)
- The Corn Is Green (Jun 1942)
- Press Gang (1946) – ABC variety show
- Invitation to Melody (April 1946) – variety show, Taylor was compere
- The Atlantic Show (Dec 1946) – with Bob Dyer
- Good Friday (1947)
- Bluebeard's Eighth Wife (Sept 1947) – with Muriel Steinbeck
- The First Gentleman (Sept 1947) – 2UW
- Shenandoah (Dec 1947) – the story of a Melbourne Cup winner
- Romona (March 1948)
- The Egg and I (November 1948)
- Men in White (November 1948)
- Nurse White (December 1948)
- Fortune's Wheel (March 1949) – a serial
- Seal Island (May, 1949)
- Red Anemones (May 1949)
- The Velvet Touch (November, 1949)
- Big City
- Body and Soul (February 1949) – with Ruth Cracknell
- The Maltese Falcon (July 1949)
- Doctor Paul (1949)
- The Saxby Millions (1949)
- Night Beat (1950)
- The Battling Bensons (1950)
- January's Daughter (1950)
- Vengeance is Mine (1950)
- The Last of Mrs Cheyney (Aug 1950)
- Homecoming (October 1950)
- The Sturt Expedition (Jan-March 1951) – nightly updates from the re-enactment of Charles Sturt's journey
- Vengeance in Mine (Nov 1951) – with Muriel Steinbeck by Tony Scott Veitch
- Black Lightning (1952)
- The Harp in the South (1952)
- Spies in Melbourne (July 1952) – with Ken Wayne, Ruth Cracknell
- The Jay Martell Show (August 1952) – compere
- The Saxby Millions (Sept 1952) – a serial
- Mobilsong (Sept 1953) – a variety show
- The Battling Bensons (Oct 1953) – a serial by Tony Scott Veitch
- They Were Champions (Sept 1954) – he narrated the story of boxer Bob Fitzsimmons who was played by Rod Taylor
- Strange Stories of the Sea (Sept – December 1954)
- The Fire of Etna (1955)
- Harry Dearth's Playhouse (1956)
- The Hidden Truth
- Shenandoah
- The Wally Norman Show
- Interpol Confidential (1961)
- Overland Patrol (1965) - BBC radio series with Taylor in the lead as Constable Adam Strang although he was eventually replaced by Charles Tingwell in 1966
