= Osbiston =

Osbiston is a surname. Notable people with the surname include:

- Alan Osbiston (1914–1971), Australian-born British film editor
- Max Osbiston (1914–1981), his cousin, Australian actor
