= Muriel Steinbeck =

Australian actress (1913–1982)

Muriel Myee Steinbeck
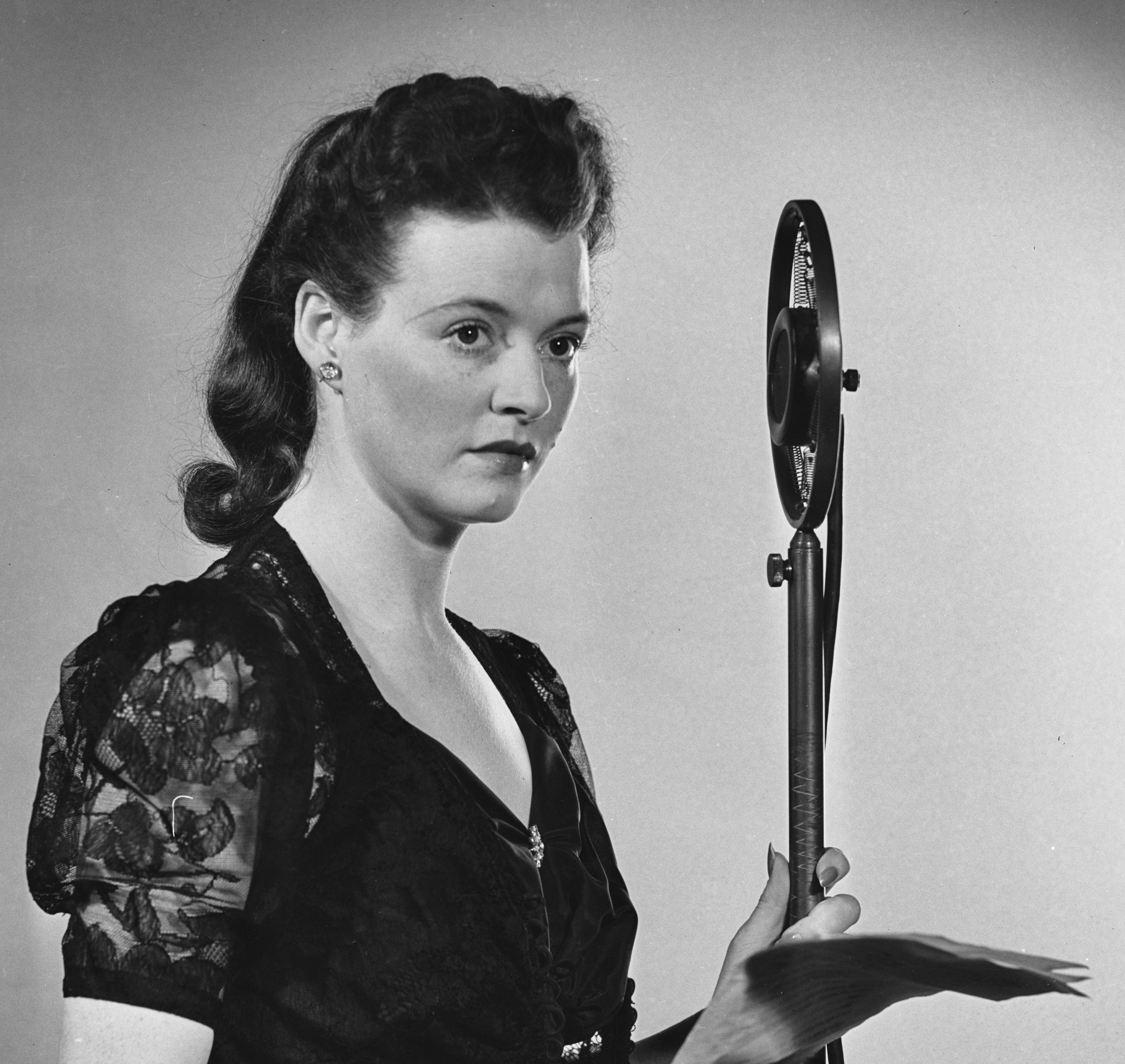
- Muriel Steinbeck in 1941
- Born: 21 July 1913; Broken Hill, New South Wales, Australia
- Died: 20 July 1982 (aged 68); Orange, New South Wales, Australia
- Other names: Muriel Myee Nicholson; Muriel Myee Aubrey
- Occupations: Actress, drama school proprietor and tutor
- Years active: 1934–1966
- Known for: Smithy
- Children: 1

Muriel Myee Steinbeck (21 July 1913 – 20 July 1982) was an Australian actress who worked extensively in radio, theatre, television and film. She is best known for her role in 1946 film Smithy (1946) and her lead role in Autumn Affair (1958–59), Australia's first television soap opera.

== Early life ==
Steinbeck was born the youngest of four children of William Martin Steinbeck and Lily Clarissa (née Batten), in Broken Hill, New South Wales, where her father, a keen Shakespearean scholar was working as a headmaster and her mother was a member of the Sydney Repertory Club. Her family left Broken Hill when Steinbeck was five.

Steinbeck was educated in Newcastle and at Sydney Girls High (1926–1930), where taking an interest in acting, she often appeared in school plays. When the family moved to Sydney she became involved in amateur theatre, appearing in plays, particularly Shakespeare, such as The Merchant of Venice and A Midsummer Night's Dream and becoming renowned for her performances in comedy and drama.

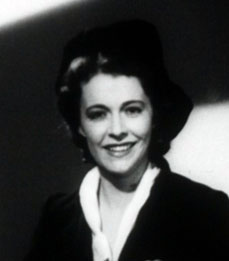
Film still for South West Pacific

== Career ==
=== Radio ===
Steinbeck was appearing in a production of Beverley Nichols' Where the Crash Comes at Sydney Players' Club, when she was spotted by Lawrence H. Cecil of the ABC. He hired her to do radio drama and her career was launched. Her first radio play was The Silver Cord and her first serial lead was The Three Diggers (1938). She was later briefly under contract to James Raglan while he was producing at Colombia where she starred in Soldier of Fortune.

Steinbeck appeared in numerous radio serials in the 1950s and 1960s, including Blue Hills, Portia Faces Life, Gabrielle and Cattleman.

=== Film ===
Steinbeck made her film debut in the wartime propaganda short, Eleventh Hour (1942), directed by Ken G. Hall. Hall then used her in another short, South West Pacific (1943). She made her feature film debut in A Son Is Born (1946), a melodrama where she played the lead role, of an unhappily married woman, alongside Peter Finch, and Ron Randell, who both went on to become major names.

The release of A Son is Born was delayed, to take advantage of publicity for her second film, Smithy, a biopic about Charles Kingsford Smith (played by Randell), in which Steinbeck played his wife. The film was a commercial success, but Steinbeck said this initially hurt her theatre career, as producers assumed she would be too expensive to hire. She resisted heading overseas to further her career, electing to stay home with her daughter, as her marriage was breaking up. Australia made few films at the time, so Steinbeck focused on radio and theatre work. She was sufficiently famous that she was able to command paid endorsements, for chocolate and lipstick.

In 1949, Steinbeck played the role of Laura in horse-racing melodrama Into the Straight and in 1951, she featured in biopic Wherever She Goes, playing the mother of the character played by Eileen Joyce. She was then in 1954 film Long John Silver.

Steinbeck's final film role before her retirement was 1966 comedy They’re a Weird Mob, in which she played Mrs. Kelly, wife of Chips Rafferty’s character Harry.

=== Television ===
Steinbeck appeared in 1954 series The Adventures of Long John Silver, playing the governor's wife. She went on to star in the lead role in Australia's first TV soap opera, Autumn Affair (1958), playing Julia Parrish, a middle-aged widowed mother who wrote popular novels.

In 1960, Steinbeck was in two TV plays – Thunder on Sycamore Street and Reflections in Dark Glasses, the latter of which was met with rave reviews. She also had a recurring role in the serial, Stormy Petrel, playing the wife of Captain Bligh.

From 1963, Steinbeck was a compere on the ABC's English for New Australians series, Making Friends. She also compered the 1963–1964 series Woman's World, focused on women's issues.

=== Theatre ===
Steinbeck began appearing on the stage regularly at the Minerva Theatre in Sydney's Kings Cross. She was in such productions as Spring Tide (1941), Claudia (1942), Watch on the Rhine (1942), Janie (1943), and The Amazing Dr Clitterhouse (1943).

In between film engagements, Steinbeck continued to work in theatre, appearing in Dangerous Corner (1946), The Third Visitor (1946), Clutterbuck (1947), and I Have Been Here Before (1948).

In 1950, Steinbeck starred as Portia in The Merchant of Venice with John Alden Company. In 1961, she was in another production of The Merchant of Venice with the Elizabethan Theatre Trust. She was in Heartbreak House (1964) at Sydney's Old Tote Theatre.

In the 1960s, after relocating to Orange, Steinbeck worked in amateur theatricals in the area.

== Personal life ==
Steinbeck was married to her first husband, Robert Aubrey, a journalist, from 7 July 1934 until their divorce in 1949. They had a daughter, Janice Claire, born in 1939.

Steinbeck then married company manager and engineer, Brian Dudley Nicholson in 1951.

Steinbeck lost a brother and a cousin during World War II; her brother was a POW and died in 1945, while her cousin was reported dead in 1944.

Although Steinbeck retired from acting in 1966, she accompanied her husband to Orange, New South Wales, to become a teacher of the arts, running her own drama school and authoring a book titled On Stage: A Practical Guide to the Actor's Craft.

Steinbeck died of cancer on 20 July 1982, aged 68.

== Filmography ==
=== Film ===
Year	Title	Role	Notes
1942	The Eleventh Hour		Short film
1942	Another Threshold	Nurse	Short film
1943	South West Pacific	The Munitions Worker (Gwennie)	Short film
1943	Grumblens	Mrs Grumblens	Short film
1944	Australia Is Like This	Mother	Documentary film
1946	Smithy	Lady Mary Kingsford Smith	
1946	A Son Is Born	Laurette Graham	
1949	Into the Straight	Laura Curzon	
1951	Wherever She Goes	Mrs. Joyce	
1952	Far West Story	Mother	
1954	Long John Silver	Lady Strong	
1966	They're a Weird Mob	Mrs. Kelly	Final film role

=== Television ===
Year	Title	Role	Notes	Ref.
1956–1977	The Adventures of Long John Silver	Governor's wife	3 episodes	
1958–1959	Autumn Affair	Julia Parrish	156 episodes	
1960	Reflections in Dark Glasses	Nancy Roberts	TV play, episode of Shell Presents	
1960	Stormy Petrel	Mrs Elizabeth Bligh	Miniseries, 3 episodes	
1960	Thunder on Sycamore Street		TV play, episode of The General Motors Hour	
1962	Jonah	Caroline Chisholm	1 episode	
1963	Making Friends	Compère		
1963–1964	Woman's World	Compère		

== Radio ==
Year	Title	Role	Notes	Ref.
	The Silver Cord			
	Macquarie Radio Theatre		2GB	
	Lux Radio Theatre		2GB / 2UW	
	James Raglan Players		2UE	
	Coriolanus		ABC	
	Abraham Lincoln		ABC	
	The Lady of the Lamp		ABC	
	Cyrano de Bergerac		ABC	
1934–1935	Smithy	Lady Kingsford Smith		
1937	Coronets of England	Lady Castlemaine	2CH / 2TM / 2HD	
1938	The Three Diggers	Lead	2BL	
1938	The Merchant of Venice	Portia	ABC	
1939	Soldier of Fortune	Queen Adeline	2LE	
1940	These Three			
1940s	When Cobb and Co. was King		2CH	
1940s	Judge Marshall’s Family		2UW, 2GB	
1941	How the Other Half Lives		2UW	
	Bulldog Drummond			
	Aunt Jenny's Real Life Stories		2UE	
	Backstage of Life			
	Strange Mysteries			
	Storm in a Teacup			
1944	Mystery of Mooredge Manor		2TM	
1944	Diary of the Air			
1945	The Man Who Didn’t Die			
1945	Come Again Crusoe			
1946	Murder without Crime			
1947	Edmund Conquest and the Pirates of the Barbary Coast	Yasmin	2UE	
1948–1951	Hagen’s Circus		2UE	
Late 1940s	The Tender Heart	Lead	2UW	
1950s	Quick As a Flash		ABC	
1950s	This is My Story		2SM	
1959	Beth			
1961	Cattleman	Judith		
1963–	English for New Australians		ABC	
	Blue Hills		ABC	
	Portia Faces Life		3UZ / 2UW	
	Gabrielle			

== Theatre ==
Year	Title	Role	Notes	Ref.
1933	Where the Crash Comes		St James' Hall, Sydney with Sydney Players Club	
1935	Drama Through the Ages		Independent Theatre, Sydney	
1936	Exit John Barcombe	Mrs Barcombe	St James' Hall, Sydney with Sydney Players Club	
1941	Spring Tide		Minerva Theatre, Sydney with Whitehall Productions	
1942	Watch on the Rhine		Minerva Theatre, Sydney with J. C. Williamson's	
1942	Claudia		Minerva Theatre, Sydney with J. C. Williamson's	
1943	Janie		Minerva Theatre, Sydney with J. C. Williamson's	
1943	The Amazing Dr. Clitterhouse		Minerva Theatre, Sydney with J. C. Williamson's	
1946	Dangerous Corner		Minerva Theatre, Sydney with Whitehall Productions	
1946	The Third Visitor		Minerva Theatre, Sydney with Whitehall Productions	
1947	Clutterbuck		Minerva Theatre, Sydney with Whitehall Productions	
1948	I Have Been Here Before		Independent Theatre, Sydney	
1950	The Merchant of Venice	Portia	Independent Theatre, Sydney, St James' Hall, Sydney with John Alden Company	
1961	The Merchant of Venice		NSW Conservatorium of Music, Elizabethan Theatre, Newtown, Cremorne Orpheum, Sydney with John Alden Company & AETT	
1964	Heartbreak House	Mrs Hushabye	UNSW Old Tote Theatre, Sydney	
