= Eleventh Hour (1942 documentary film) =

- Directed by: Ken G. Hall
- Produced by: Ken G. Hall
- Starring: Muriel Steinbeck; John Nugent Hayward; Margaret Sinclair
- Production company: Cinesound Productions
- Distributed by: Columbia
- Release date: November 1942
- Running time: 11 minutes
- Country: Australia
- Language: English

Eleventh Hour is a 1942 Australian short documentary film from director Ken G. Hall for the Department of Information.

It was the third in a series of movies to promote Austerity War Loans, following Another Threshold.

== Plot ==
A woman wonders if the sacrifices of war are worth it. Her first World War veteran husband assures her that it is.

== Cast ==
- Muriel Steinbeck as the wife
- John Nugent Hayard as the husband
- Margaret Sinclair as the daughter in law

== Reception ==
The Sydney Morning Herald wrote that:

Ken Hall... has used the Anzac Day memorial services with effect... [the film] should rally the dilatory to the war bond booths. Muriel Steinbeck Is splendid... The mournful retrospection of... [the wife]... could with advantage be less insistent in the script, and more heartening implication and less exhortation be given to the propaganda angle of the narrative.

Smith's Weekly said "Nothing is over-dramatised, and the mother...in the opening scenes particularly, is genuinely moving." The Age called it "impressive".
