= South West Pacific (disambiguation) =

South West Pacific is a geographical region in the Pacific Ocean.

It may also refer to:

- South West Pacific (film), a 1943 Australian film
- South West Pacific Area, a World War II military command
