= Henry Clutterbuck =

Henry Clutterbuck may refer to:

- Henry Clutterbuck (writer) (1767–1856), English medical writer
- Henry Clutterbuck (footballer) (1873–1948), English footballer
- Henry Clutterbuck (cricketer) (1809–1883), English cleric and cricketer
