= Wherever She Goes =

- Directed by: Michael Gordon
- Written by: Michael Gordon; Barbara Woodward (add dialogue)
- Based on: Prelude: The Early Life of Eileen Joyce by Lady Clare Hoskyns-Abrahall
- Produced by: Michael Gordon
- Starring: Suzanne Parrett; Muriel Steinbeck
- Cinematography: George Heath
- Edited by: Brereton Porter
- Production company: Faun Film Productions
- Distributed by: British Empire Films
- Release dates: 6 July 1951 (UK); 7 September 1951 (Aust)
- Running time: 80 mins
- Countries: United Kingdom; Australia
- Language: English

Wherever She Goes is a 1951 British-Australian drama musical film that tells the early part of the life story of pianist Eileen Joyce. Directed by Michael Gordon, it stars Suzanne Parrett, Eileen Joyce, Nigel Lovell and Muriel Steinbeck.

== Synopsis ==
Eileen Joyce is born on the Tasmanian coast and becomes fascinated with music after hearing a man named Daniel play a mouth organ. When her parents decide to move the family to the Kalgoorlie goldfields Eileen sees a piano and resolves to play it. Her father's mine fails and the family has to live in a tent.

Eileen is given an old piano as a Christmas gift and soon becomes a child prodigy. She enters a local music carnival and wins. The story ends when she leaves Kalgoorlie to go to Perth, then flashes forward to a grown up Eileen playing in a concert.

== Cast ==
- Suzanne Parrett as young Eileen Joyce
- Pamela Page was the pianist for the close-up scenes of the pianist's hands.
- Muriel Steinbeck as Mrs Joyce
- Nigel Lovell as Will Joyce
- George Wallace as the stage manager
- Eileen Joyce as herself (non-speaking role)
- Sefton Daly as farmer/pianist
- Tim Drysdale as John Joyce
- Rex Dawe as Mr James
- Syd Chambers
- John Wiltshire as Daniel
- Harold Bourne as Bob

== Production ==
The film was one of several planned by independent companies in association with Ealing Studios to use Pagewood Studios in between official Ealing productions.

The director was Michael Gordon (1909 – 2008), an English film editor, and it was the only full-length feature film he directed. He had given a copy of the book on which the film was based to his children, and his wife suggested that it would make a good film. Both the book and the film were highly fictionalised accounts of Joyce's life. The opening credits of the film state that only the two children were real people and everyone else was fictionalised.

Gordon arrived in Australia in August 1949 to start work on the film. Eileen Joyce herself is shown at the start and end of the film, performing the Grieg Piano Concerto in A minor, but she was primarily played by Suzanne Parrett, who never made another film. Parrett's hand double was Pamela Page.

The bulk of the movie was shot at Pagewood Studios in Sydney, with some location filming in Kalgoorlie and the Huon Valley. It features the last screen performance of comedian George Wallace, who plays a stage manager. The cast also includes Tim Drysdale, son of Australian artist Russell Drysdale. Filmink later argued "Steinbeck should have played the title role but is wasted in the part of her mother."

== Reception ==
The film had its Australian premiere at The Strand Theatre in Hobart, and was introduced by Tasmanian Premier Robert Cosgrove. It was one of the few Australian films of the time to receive a cinema release in the United States as well as the UK, but box office receipts were poor and critical reception mixed although Suzanne Parrett's performance was praised.

Kine Weekly wrote "Suzanne Parrett creates a most favourable impression as the youthful Eileen, but the rest of the cast, to say nothing of the script, is well below standard." Variety wrote "Although the film won't send indie film importers scurrying through the Australian bush for additional product, “Wherever She Goes” shapes up as a fair art house attraction."

Filmink wrote the film "is not a masterpiece, but it’s the sort of bread-and-butter biopic Australia should (and could) have made more of: it’s got engaging child actors, location filming in Tasmania and Western Australia, plenty of music and a good heart. The movie was not a huge hit, though it had a long life… it popped up on television a bit when we were growing up and had a quite wide release in the US."
