= The Three Diggers =

Australian radio serial

- Written by: E.V. Timms
- Starring: Max Osbiston; Henry Howlett; George Hewlett; Muriel Steinbeck
- No. of episodes: 200+

Production
- Producer: Charles Wheeler

Original release
- Network: 2BL
- Release: January 1938 – 1939

The Three Diggers is a 1938 Australian radio serial by E.V. Timms. It aired on 2BL as part of a special radio session for 'diggers'.

Timms was a former Australian soldier who had served in World War One. Three Diggers was among his best remembered radio work.

Timms was approached to write it by the ABC. It started in January 1938. There was a special session for Australian soldiers five nights a week from 7pm to 7.15pm. The serial Three Diggers aired Monday, Wednesday and Friday.

The serial ran for over 200 episodes, when it was cancelled in mid-1939.

Timms later co wrote the script for the film Forty Thousand Horsemen which was about three diggers in World War One.

== Cast ==
- Max Osbiston as Jim
- Henry Howlett as Whistling Bill
- George Hewlett as Shady
- Muriel Steinbeck
