= Penthouse (Australian TV series) =

- Genre: Talk show
- Presented by: Pat Firman
- Country of origin: Australia
- Original language: English

Original release
- Network: ATN-7
- Release: 1960 – 1961

Penthouse is an Australian television series which aired 1960 to 1961 on Sydney station ATN-7. It was a daytime series featuring Pat Firman interviewing guests in a set designed to look like a penthouse apartment. It was sponsored by the magazines Woman's Day and Pix.

== Episodes ==
The archival status of the series is not known, though a single episode is held by the National Film and Sound Archive. This episode features singer Rolf Harris and Janine Arnold.
