= Far West Story =

- Directed by: T.O. McCreadie
- Produced by: T.O. McCreadie; George Hughes
- Starring: Grant Taylor
- Production company: McCreadie Brothers Embassy Picture
- Release date: 1952
- Country: Australia
- Language: English

Far West Story is a 1952 Australian short film which had a cinematic release.

It was made to promote the Far West Children's Health Scheme.

It starred Muriel Steinbeck and Grant Taylor and was produced by T.O. McCreadie.

ABC Weekly called it a "moving, well-told little story."

== Plot ==
A young girl living on an outback station comes down with polio.

== Cast ==
- Alan Clarke
- Laurie Mathers
- Grant Taylor
- Muriel Steinbeck as Mother
