= Pyre for Private James =

- The Wednesday Play episode
- Episode no.: Season 1 Episode 24
- Directed by: Gilchrist Calder
- Teleplay by: Simon Raven
- Production code: BBC
- Original air date: November 30, 1966
- Running time: 43 mins

Pyre for Private James is a 1966 episode of The Wednesday Play for British television.

== Premise ==
Major Andrew Carlyle faces a court martial for murder after shooting to death Private Trevor James during a jungle patrol.

It is revealed Carlyle was an obsessed man who killed his injured driver.

== Cast ==
- Basil Henson as Major Andrew Carlyle
- Percy Herbert as Colour Sergeant David Mackison
- Dudley Sutton as Corporal Tom Oates
- David Conville as Captain Jeremy Dilston
- Grant Taylor as Colonel Lloyd Beacher, Prosecuting Officer
- John Bailey as Humphrey Wiles, Counsel for Defence
- William Fox as Judge Advocate
- Basil Dignam as President of Court Martial
- Nick Tate as Private Trevor James

== Production ==
It was one of Nick Tate's first appearances after arriving in Britain.

== Reception ==
The Guardian said "all the episodes introduced in the telling of the story were handled with a strong sense of the dramatic."

The Leicester Mercury critic thought "the dramatic climax never came" although he enjoyed the acting and handling.

The Daily Mirror called it "slow moving but often dramatically sure".

The Observer thought "nearly everybody was hamming it up in the jungle scenes."
