= Patricia Firman =

Australian model and actress (1922–1980)

- Born: 1922; Australia
- Died: June 1980 (aged 58); Sydney, Australia
- Occupations: Model, actress, tv personality
- Years active: 1936–1974

Patricia Firman (1922 – June 1980) was an Australian model, actress and TV personality.

She began her career aged 14 when discovered by Cinesound Productions. She was a contender for the female lead in Forty Thousand Horsemen but lost to Betty Bryant.

She was an early panellist on the Beauty and the Beast TV show and had her own program Penthouse.

She died of cancer in June 1980

== Select film credits ==
- 100,000 Cobbers (1942) – film
- Another Threshold (1942) – film
- Australia Is Like This (1944)
- Beauty and the Beast (1964–74)

== Select theatre credits ==
- Mannequins (1938) – play
- Three Cornered Moon (1938) – play
- Spring Tide (1941) – play – Minerva Theatre, Sydney 1941
- The Wind and the Rain Theatre Royal, Sydney 1944
- The Maid of the Mountains – Theatre Royal, Adelaide 1945
- The Merry Widow – Theatre Royal, Adelaide 1945
- Dangerous Corner – Minerva Theatre, Sydney 1946
- Youth at the Helm – Minerva, Sydney 1946
- Sweetest and Lowest: A Revue – Minvera, Sydney 1947
- The Little Hut – Theatre Royal, Adelaide 1956
- Both Ends Meet – Theatre Royal, Adelaide 1956
