= Thunder on Sycamore Street =

- The General Motors Hour episode
- The Age 21 Jul 1960
- Episode no.: Season 1 Episode 3
- Directed by: David Cahill
- Teleplay by: Reginald Rose
- Original air date: 23 July 1960
- Running time: 60 mins

Guest appearance
- Frank Waters

Episode chronology
← Previous "This is Television"	Next → "You, Too, Can Have a Body"

"Thunder on Sycamore Street" is a 1960 Australian television play directed by David Cahill. It was based on a script by Reginald Rose. It aired on 23 July 1960 in Melbourne and Sydney.

It followed production of The Grey Nurse Said Nothing as part of General Motors Hour. Like that production it starred Frank Waters.

== Plot ==
The residents of Sycamore Street are upset when they discover a new neighbour has served a prison sentence.

== Cast ==
- Frank Waters as Joseph Blake
- Joe McCormick
- Muriel Steinbeck
- John Brunskill
- Richard Davies as the man of conscience
- James Fallows
- Brett Hart
- Benita Harvey
- Mary Hoskin
- Therese Macrae
- Verity Marina
- Terry McDermott
- Ida Newton
- Moya O'Sullivan
- Max Osbiston
- Ivor Bromley

== Production ==
The drama was produced in ATN 7 Studio 'A' at its Television Centre in Epping. This studio is the largest production studio for TV in Australia. The major set, representing the exteriors of three homes, covered 2,000 square feet. It was the largest single set ever installed at the ATN studios, and ATN production executives said it was the biggest single set ever made for Australian live TV. A further 600 feet was allowed for the roadway and for camera movement. As all three houses in which the action of the play was set were identical, a second basic set was used, covering about 500 additional feet of studio space.

It was one of the last appearances of Muriel Steinbeck.

The play had been performed on Australian radio in 1959.

== Reception ==
The TV critic for The Sydney Morning Herald said the production "gave audiences something to think about" and was "careful enough, although evidences of pinch-pennyism were apparent... Frank Waters... stood head and shoulders over a comparatively indifferent cast."

== See also ==
- List of television plays broadcast on ATN-7
