= Joseph Post =

Joseph Post OBE
- Born: Joseph Mozart Post; 10 April 1906; Erskineville, Sydney, Australia
- Died: 27 December 1972 (aged 66); Gold Coast, Queensland, Australia
- Occupations: Conductor; music administrator
- Spouse: Nancye Lille Tucker (m. 1943)

Joseph Mozart Post OBE (10 April 1906 – 27 December 1972) was an Australian conductor and music administrator. He made an unrivalled contribution to the development of opera-conducting in Australia and was, in Roger Covell's words, the 'first Australian-born musician to excel in this genre'. As an orchestral conductor, he was judged a 'good all-round man': he was well regarded for his enthusiasm, clarity and economy of gesture, but he was not associated with inspiring or challenging musicianship. Nonetheless, his ability to take over conducting assignments at very short notice became legendary and he was often greeted with 'rave' reviews.

== Early years ==
Joseph Post was born on 10 April 1906 at Erskineville, Sydney, the eldest child of Australian-born parents. His mother was a chorister, and his father an conductor who involved himself with church choirs and suburban musical societies. He and his brothers were given the surnames of famous composers for their middle names; he was Joseph Mozart, and his brothers were John Verdi and Noel Schumann. Joseph regarded his father as his most important mentor and severest critic. Although the family had Jewish connections, Post was raised as a Roman Catholic; he later became an atheist.

He attended the Christian Brothers' parish school at Waverley (now Waverley College), won a scholarship, and at age 9 was among the first students at the New South Wales State Conservatorium of Music, of which he was later to become the director (1966–71). Post studied piano and oboe, and from the age of 15 he played oboe with the New South Wales State Orchestra until it was disbanded in 1922.

== Career ==
Post first toured with theatre orchestras, visiting New Zealand in 1924 with one of J.C. Williamson Ltd's musical-comedy companies.

By 1926 Post was teaching oboe and cor anglais at the conservatorium; later, he also offered tuition in piano. He graduated in 1927 with diplomas in performance and teaching (pianoforte). Despite such auspicious beginnings, he did not see his vocation as a teacher nor as an orchestral musician, but chose to build a career as a conductor. The elder Post gave his son extensive informal training in the conductor's art. In 1932 Post seized an opportunity to organize a 350-voice choir for the Imperial Opera Company (a touring Italian troupe) to perform in the Williamson Imperial Grand Opera Season. When the regular conductor became indisposed, Post conducted a performance of Verdi's Aida at only a few hours' notice, which led to regular conducting appearances with the company.

The establishment of the Australian Broadcasting Commission in 1932 introduced a powerful new force to the Australian music scene. Post recognized the potential of radio and accepted an offer from the ABC to form a wireless chorus in Sydney. He severed his connection with the conservatorium, did some conducting with Sir Benjamin Fuller's Royal Grand Opera Company and visited Europe in 1935. Returning to Australia, he moved to Melbourne. From 1936 to 1947 he worked for the ABC as a conductor of the Victorian Symphony Orchestra and the city's ABC wireless chorus. Whilst driving through Bairnsdale on a roadtrip from Melbourne to Sydney in 1937, Post was involved in a car crash and sustained slight injuries.

Post served in World War II as a lieutenant, acting major, and commandant of the transshipment centre at Terowie, South Australia, an important staging point on the overland supply route to Darwin. He relinquished command in February 1945 and was placed on the Reserve List of Officers in March.

After the war, Post continued as one of the ABC's main conductors. From 1947 to 1957 he was associate conductor with the Sydney Symphony Orchestra, during Sir Eugene Goossens's tenure as chief conductor. Post made many guest appearances with ABC orchestras across Australia. He conducted the first performance of the Tasmanian Symphony Orchestra on 25 May 1948; the soloist was the pianist Eileen Joyce.

In 1950 he went to Britain on exchange with Charles Groves, conductor of the British Broadcasting Corporation's Northern Orchestra (now the BBC Philharmonic). At his debut at the Royal Albert Hall, Post became the first Australian to conduct at a Promenade Concert; he included a piece by the Australian composer Clive Douglas. He also conducted the Hallé Orchestra and other British orchestras.

Despite such successes, Post's career with the ABC was marred by disappointment. In 1945 he had submitted a proposal to the ABC to establish the Victorian Symphony Orchestra on a full-time basis, but he was twice overlooked for the position of principal conductor. He made no secret of his chagrin when he was not appointed director of music in 1957. Throughout his long tenure with the ABC, he never relinquished his involvement with his first love, opera. He was musical director (1947–54) of Gertrude Johnson's National Theatre Movement and principal conductor (from 1949) for its opera. In addition, Post also conducted seasons with the New South Wales National Opera in Sydney, and joint seasons of the combined opera companies in 1952. Granted leave from the ABC, he was appointed musical director of the Australian Elizabethan Theatre Trust (now Opera Australia) in 1955. He conducted the trust's first opera production, Mozart's The Marriage of Figaro, in 1956, but resigned next year to return to the ABC as assistant director of music.

Heavier administrative responsibilities did not significantly curtail the number of Post's performances. In 1963 he established the Sydney Little Symphony Orchestra and conducted its debut series of four concerts. He also continued his long association with school concerts. The advent of television broadcasting created new audiences for him. He made television appearances with the Sydney Symphony and conducted numerous operas on television. In 1962 he travelled to Europe and the USA to investigate methods of presenting music on television.

At a time when most Australian classical musicians depended on success abroad, Post built a public career in Australia. He and Sir Bernard Heinze represented the first generation of native-born conductors to rise to prominence under the ABC. Post conducted when an Australian was required to support visiting celebrity musicians. The role suited his talents admirably. He was proud of his efforts to promote 'Australian' composers, releasing recordings of Raymond Hanson's Concerto for Trumpet and Orchestra (1948) and Robert Hughes's Xanadu (1954). Nor was he averse to the performance of 'new music', though his tastes could hardly be regarded as avant garde.

In 1966 Post was appointed an Officer of the Order of the British Empire (OBE). That year he succeeded Heinze as director of the New South Wales State Conservatorium of Music. He was the first of its former students to fill the position. He eventually put considerable effort into the conservatorium's opera school, but limited his wider involvement to consolidating initiatives begun by Heinze.

Increasingly dogged by ill health, Post resigned from the conservatorium in late 1971 and moved to the Gold Coast, Queensland. He died of myocardial disease on 27 December 1972 at Broadbeach and was cremated. At St Patrick's Cathedral, Melbourne, on 12 May 1943 he had married Nancye Lille Tucker, a 28-year-old stenographer. His wife and their daughter Nola survived him. He had actively discouraged Nola from any sort of musical training.
