= You, Too, Can Have a Body =

- The General Motors Hour episode
- SMH ad 15 Aug 1960
- Episode no.: Season 1 Episode 4
- Directed by: Rod Kinnear
- Teleplay by: Fred Robinson
- Original air dates: 20 August 1960 (Sydney, Melbourne)
- Running time: 90 mins

Episode chronology
← Previous "Thunder on Sycamore Street"	Next → "Shadow of a Pale Horse"

"You, Too, Can Have a Body" is a 1960 Australian television play that screened as part of The General Motors Hour.

It was based on a play which had been performed on stage and television in England. It was shot in the GTV 9 Studios in Melbourne.

== Plot ==
Two television scriptwriters—Chick Weld (Bill Maynnrd) and Lucky Wilson (Mark Kelly) — accept an invitation from Lord Leverdale to stay at the haunted Creckwood Castle. The castle is haunted by The Black Monk, who was tortured to death in 1305 for practising magic. The two script writers work on a television play as mysterious goings on happen at the castle.

== Cast ==
- Bill Maynard as Chick Wade
- Campbell Copelin as Lord Loverdale
- Mark Kelly as Chick Wade's assistant
- Diana Bell as Maud Tarrant
- Ivan Vander
- John Morgan
- Melissa Jaffer
- Mary Ward
- Lyn Rowe
- Godfrey Philipp

== Production ==
The play was based on a British play by Fred Robinson which was first performed in England in 1958. The cast was headed by Bill Maynard who subsequently moved to Australia where he repeated his stage performance in the TV play. Robinson later wrote The Larkins.

Mark Kelly played the role played in London by Australian actor Bill Kerr. The production was taped on 24 July 1960 at GTV 9 Studios in Melbourne for simultaneous broadcast in Sydney and Melbourne. Except for a few cuts it was substantially the same as that presented at Victoria Palace between June and September 1958. Rod Kinner said he felt Maynard was more a "comedy actor than a comedian.

== Reception ==
The Age said "it did have a few good laughs and was a useful vehicle" for Maynard.

In 1967 Agnes Harrison reviewed the first decade of Melbourne television and said Body was the "least 'worthy'" of dramas made in Melbourne but said "this slap-happy play achieved something in showing off the throw-away comedy talents of its producer-star, Englishman Bill Maynard, of happy memory."
