= Seal Island (radio drama) =

Scottish radio play

Seal Island is a Scottish radio play by Ewen MacGregor. It debuted on the BBC in 1942.

== Premise ==
On an island on the Hebrides, a man called Neil writes a book on superstitions. He is with his wife, Morag.

== Australian radio ==
The play was adapted for Australian radio in 1943.

It was again adapted for Australian radio in 1949 with Grant Taylor and John Bushelle. It played for one hour. One reviewer said it was "worthy of a top spot in any ABC programme".
