= Max Olding and Pamela Page =

Australian husband and wife pianists

Max Olding AM (4 July 1929 – 17 November 2021) and Pamela Page (born 4 April 1934) were a distinguished Australian husband and wife team of duo-pianists. They performed separately in recitals and as concerto soloists, chamber music performers and accompanists both nationally and internationally, but were best known as a piano duo.

They met when they tied for first place in the inaugural Royal Concert Trust Fund Competition in London in 1954. They married in Vienna in 1955.

They performed as a duo for the opening of ABC Television in 1956. They gave many recitals in Australia, the United Kingdom, the United States, Austria, Vietnam, Thailand, Malaysia, Indonesia, Hong Kong, and New Zealand. In Australia they appeared with all major and many regional orchestras.

Their repertoire was extensive and included original two-piano works and concertos as well as arrangements and transcriptions. Larry Sitsky composed his Concerto for Two Solo Pianos for this duo. Olding and Page recorded this work with the Sydney Symphony Orchestra in 1977 on the World Record Club label. Many other works have been dedicated to them by composers including Felix Werder, Peter Sculthorpe, Philip Bračanin, John Carmichael and Margaret Sutherland.

In the 1950s, Olding and Page were duo-pianists who broadcast recitals on Australian Broadcasting Corporation radio, including repertoire by Australian composer Margaret Sutherland.

In 1975, Olding and Page appeared on TV, performing music for four hands in the Australian Broadcasting Corporation's educational television series, All About Music.

During the 1970s, 1980s and 1990s, Olding and Page performed together in concerts that were also broadcast nationally on ABC radio.

Max Olding and Pamela Page have one son, the violinist Dene Olding.

In 2025, the Australian Piano Duo Festival Inc. announced a new piano duet/duo prize honouring Pamela Page and Max Olding.

== Max Olding ==
Maxwell Charles Olding was born on 4 July 1929. He grew up in Launceston, Tasmania, where as a pianist he often competed against Australian composer Peter Sculthorpe, who later joked that he turned his focus to composition because he could never beat Olding in piano competitions. In 1950, at age 21, he was appointed an Australian Music Examinations Board (AMEB) Examiner. He won the Commonwealth final of the 1952 ABC's Concerto Competition.

He began his tertiary teaching career at the University of Melbourne Conservatorium. He was an adjudicator at the 1952 City of Sydney Eisteddfod and has since adjudicated at most of Australia's major music competitions, has chaired many of them and has acted as external examiner for higher degrees at the Universities of Melbourne, Western Australia, Tasmania, Queensland, Southern Queensland and Queensland University of Technology (QUT). Olding adjudicated at the 2010 National Young Performers Awards in Invercargill, New Zealand.

In 1952 he was a state finalist in the ABC Concerto and Vocal Competition.

He was a patron of the Music Teachers Association of Queensland, the Piano Tuners and Technicians Guild and was a Fellow of the Queensland Conservatorium. He gave many master classes and seminars nationally and internationally.

He was deputy chair and principal examiner (Instrumental) for the Australian Music Examinations Board (AMEB) in Queensland. In later years he also worked extensively in Southeast Asia and New Zealand for the board in examining and promotional activities.

Max Olding held positions as president of the Queensland Symphony Orchestra Society and deputy chair of the Brisbane Institute of Art. He was patron of the Queensland Piano Tuners and Technicians Guild, and was a Life Member of the Accompanists Guild of Queensland.

Olding was a Churchill Fellow, awarded in 1970 "To investigate new methods and techniques relating to pianoforte teaching and instruction at advanced and tertiary levels – Japan, Russia, Hungary, France, UK, USA".

Olding recorded chamber music including cello and piano works by Australian composer Dulcie Holland, on the CD, Study in Green: Music of Australian Composers; Mozart, Beethoven and Brahms with violinist Dene Olding on Great Violin Sonatas; and several pieces with Dene Olding on the compilation album, The Essential Violin.

Max Olding recorded solo piano examination repertoire for the AMEB.

He was also involved in conducting symphonic, choral, operatic and theatre works as well as teaching, administration and as organist and choirmaster.

In 2011, Olding (along with Page) received a Doctor of Music honoris causa from the University of Queensland, where he had taught piano for many years. He also held senior teaching and administrative positions at the Queensland Conservatorium Griffith University (deputy director and principal lecturer in piano); QUT (acting head and senior lecturer); and City University of New York (visiting professor).

He died on 17 November 2021, aged 92.

== Pamela Page ==
Pamela Harcourt Page was born on 4 April 1934. She won an Empire Overseas Scholarship to study at Trinity College of Music, London, where she was awarded the Maude Seton Prize for the most outstanding student. She later performed on BBC radio and television and gave solo and concerto performances in London and the English counties. She was subsequently accepted into Walter Gieseking's master class in Saarbrücken.

Back in Australia, Page provided the close-up scenes of the pianist's hands in Wherever She Goes, a 1951 biographical film about Eileen Joyce (whose character was otherwise played by Suzanne Parrett).

During the 1950s and 1960s, Pamela Page was a pianist for the Australian Broadcasting Commission, now known as the Australian Broadcasting Corporation (ABC), including as a solo pianist.

Page has performed as a pianist in a recording with the Queensland Symphony Orchestra.

Page gave many concerto performances in all capital cities, recitals on ABC radio, live TV appearances and also hosted a TV children's show.

Later, Page was appointed senior lecturer at the Faculty of Music, University of Queensland.

Pamela Page is also a painter, and has performed Mussorgsky's Pictures at an Exhibition accompanied by the display of her art.

Pamela Page has recorded solo piano examination repertoire for the Australian Music Examinations Board.

Pamela Page is a Life Member of the Accompanists Guild of Queensland.

In 2011, she (along with Olding) received a Doctor of Music honoris causa from the University of Queensland, where she had been employed in a teaching capacity since 1968.

== Honours and awards ==
In January 1991, Max Olding was appointed a Member of the Order of Australia (AM) "for service to music and to music education".

The Australian Music Examinations Board (AMEB) in Queensland has named its auditorium the Max Olding Auditorium.

Both Pamela Page and Max Olding were awarded the Centenary Medal in 2001.
