= The One That Got Away (1964 film) =

- Written by: Maureen Walsh
- Starring: Grant Taylor
- Country of origin: Australia
- Original language: English

Production
- Producer: Gerald Turney-Smith
- Cinematography: Ron Horner
- Production company: Visatone Television Pty Ltd

Original release
- Release: 1964

The One That Got Away is a 1964 Australian television show.

== Plot ==
A family leaves a teaching job and a home in the suburbs. They live in a tiny shack in the bush and the father becomes a fisherman.

== Cast ==
- Leonard Teale as Major Arthur Dawson
- Deryck Barnes
- Janette Craig
- Gordon Glenwright
- John Heywood
- Mark McManus
- June Salter
- Grant Taylor
- Bob McDarra
