= Wayne Froman =

American actor

Wayne Froman was an American actor who worked extensively in Australia, in particularly on radio. He also appeared on stage and in the film South West Pacific.

He had worked as a comedian in New York when he arrived in Australia in late 1939 to appear in Ziegfeld Follies.

In July 1945, he and a number of other actors were banned for three months from radio for broadcasting "objectionable matter".
