= While There Is Still Time =

While There is Still Time
- Directed by: Charles Chauvel
- Written by: Charles Chauvel; Elsa Chauvel
- Produced by: Charles Chauvel
- Starring: Peter Finch; Chips Rafferty; Grant Taylor
- Narrated by: Claude Flemming
- Cinematography: George Heath
- Production company: Charles Chauvel Enterproses
- Distributed by: Universal
- Release date: 9 October 1942
- Running time: 12 mins
- Country: Australia
- Language: English

While There is Still Time is a 1942 short Australian dramatised documentary about Australian soldiers during World War II directed by Charles Chauvel.

It was the second in a series of films produced by the Austerity Loan Campaign.

== Premise ==
A young woman, Gracie, is bored with her factory work and dissatisfied with war life. Her soldier boyfriend, Jim, is blinded while fighting overseas, and writes her a letter which inspires Gracie and her workmates to make sacrifices and win the war.

== Cast ==
- Nola Warren as Gracie
- Peter Finch as Jim
- Chips Rafferty
- John Nugent
- Beatrice Wenban
- Bobbie Hunt
- Grant Taylor

== Production ==
The film was known during production as Five Minutes to Midnight.

== Reception ==
The Sydney Morning Herald called it:

A first-class production. This is easily the most impressive, most gripping locally-made documentary yet screened here. Its message is the memory it leaves, more than its brief, indirect request for the support of the austerity loan. Mr. Chauvel has most effectively clothed propaganda with compelling drama. As it should, the film will make many uncomfortable. Every one of its thirteen minutes is vibrant with quiet domestic realism and the humorous and tragic notes of its brief, but very boiling, Libyan episode... The film has as its theme the routing of selfishness by the recogni-tion of sacrifice. Its implications cut deep, and the narrative, poignant and very convincing, will leave none un-moved, for the film has an emotional quality rare in Australian productions. Acted by some of our most natural screen players, it gives newcomer Noala Warren the leading role, which she plays with astonishing poise and ability.

The Brisbane Telegraph said Chauvel "made it well".

The Sydney Daily Telegraph called it "more human, shrewder, and moving than any previous such documentary" praising "Nola Warren's extraordinarily real heroine" and the "Skilfully blending its home scenes with a most effective shot of Libya, the film keeps its message reasonably within bounds until the final scene. Why doesn't someone inform the D.O.I. heads that indirect propaganda is the best?"

Smith's Weekly thought it "suffers from over-dramatisation, and from the fact that too much footage is given to Nola Warren, the munition worker, and her father, played by Nugent Hayward. Peter Finch does a good job, and Chips Rafferty only needs to lift an eyebrow to put punch into a scene. '"While There Is Still Time" would have been more valuable to the Austerity Loan Campaign if it had had a - severe pruning. Claude Flemming gives effect to the commentary."
