= Clatterbuck =

Clatterbuck is a surname. Notable people with the surname include:

- Bobby Clatterbuck (1932–2004), American football player
- Nick Clatterbuck (born c. 1969), American juvenile convicted of murder
- Sarah Clatterbuck, American engineer

== See also ==
- Clutterbuck
