= Clare H. Abrahall =

British writer

Clare Hoskyns-Abrahall
- Clare Constance Maria Drury Hoskyns-Abrahall
- Clare Hoskyns-Abrahall in 1950
- Born: Clare Constance Maria Drury; 31 January 1900; London, England
- Died: 29 November 1990 (aged 90); England, UK
- Occupation: Writer
- Writing career
- Pen name: C.H. Abrahall, Clare H. Abrahall, C.M. Drury
- Language: English language

Clare Hoskyns-Abrahall, née Drury (31 January 1900 – 29 November 1990) was a British writer as C.H. Abrahall, Clare H. Abrahall or occasionally as C.M. Drury. She wrote biographies and historical fiction for children and young adults, school stories, stage plays which she sometimes helped produce, and more. She is known for her book Prelude about the pianist Eileen Joyce which was turned into a film, Wherever She Goes.

== Biography ==
Clare Constance Maria Drury was born on 31 January 1900 in London to Gertrude Elizabeth (née Holt) and Lieutenant-Colonel Richard Frederick Drury, a civil engineer who was in the RAF during World War I. They were living in Wheathampstead by the time Clare (sometimes Clara) Drury was eleven and this was still the family home in 1925. She was educated at St Helen's School, Abingdon and then at the Royal College of Music. Towards the end of the First World War she served as a driver in the parachute section of the Women's Royal Air Force. During World War II she was a commandant in the British Red Cross.

On 21 February 1925 she married Theo Chandos Hoskyns-Abrahall (1896–1975), who worked in the Colonial Service, mainly in Nigeria. They had three Children: Priscilla (b. 1926), Robin Chandos (b. 1928) and Follett Peter Mark (b. 1934). They divorced in 1944. The same year her ex-husband remarried Lois Jennet Ogle. In 1950 T. C. Hoskyns-Abrahall was made a knight. After his knighthood Clare Hoskyns-Abrahall was sometimes called Lady Clare Hoskyns-Abrahall, despite the divorce and the prevailing conventions. In 1953 newspapers reported her shouting repeatedly at a political meeting because she felt the speaker "was saying such horrible things about England". She described her politics as "Conservative".

Clare Hoskyns-Abrahall survived her daughter Priscilla and son Follett and died on 29 November 1990. Her other son Robin died in 1995.

== Writing and drama ==
=== Books for children and young adults ===
- Kit Norris: Schoolgirl Pilot, Juvenile Productions, Runnymede series, 1937 ~ A combination of a school story friendship plot with a "flying melodrama".
- From Serf to Page, Harrap, 1939 ~ During the Peasants' Revolt in 1381 a young boy has split loyalties between his father, Clod, and an aristocratic benefactor.
- Priscilla's Caravan, Epworth, 1939
- Chris of Crighton's, Parrish 1964 ~ A "more mature" story of a girl settling into a new school.
- Looking after wild birds, Corgi mini-book 1971

=== Biographical books for children and young adults ===
After meeting at a charity concert around 1945, Hoskyns-Abrahall persuaded the concert pianist Eileen Joyce to let her tell her story, in which she incorporated imaginative sections about Joyce's early life. They became friends and in the 1950s Hoskyns-Abrahall accompanied Joyce on concert tours, overseas and in the UK. The biography, Prelude, was her most successful book. Originally aimed at children, it was also read by adults. Not only was it re-published several times in English, it was translated into other languages too, including German (Ein Mädchen macht Karriere) and Dutch. After the film version, Wherever She Goes, stage and radio adaptations followed.

- Prelude, OUP 1947 ~ "An imaginative account of the early life of Eileen Joyce."
- Boadicea, Queen of the Iceni, Harrap 1949 ~ Boadicea is portrayed as someone who died for the "cause of freedom".
- Finale, Adelina de Lara in collaboration with Clare H. Abrahall, Burke 1955
- The young Marie Curie, Parrish 1961 (also in Spanish)
- The young Elizabeth Barrett Browning, Parrish 1962
- The young Louis Braille, Parrish 1964
- The young John Bunyan, Parrish 1968

In the 1950s a newspaper reported on a forthcoming book by Hoskyns-Abrahall, Kate Fox and the Princesses, the story of the nanny to Princesses Olga, Elisabeth and Marina. It is listed in a reference book but not in authoritative library catalogues.

=== Plays ===
Hoskyns-Abrahall was a member of the Arts Theatre Club, and of the Hovenden Theatre Club, both in London. She was sometimes involved in production as well as writing.

- Palissy the Potter in Short plays from history, edited by A. E. M. Bayliss, 1940
- The Light Within, with Ross Mackenzie, staged at the Hovenden Theatre Club ~ The story of Elizabeth Fry
- Pitchblende, with Justine Glover, staged at the Hovenden Theatre Club ~ The story of Marie Curie
- Florence Nightingale
- Butler in a Box, Steele's Play Bureau, c1963 ~ "Set in a Scottish castle, with thunder and lightning outside and murder within."
- Amateur Dramatics, Collins nutshell, 1963 ~ Advice on producing plays.
