= Australia Is Like This =

Australia is Like This
- Written by: Jack S Allan; Jesse Lasky Jnr
- Produced by: Jack S Allan
- Starring: Grant Taylor
- Production companies: Commonwealth Department of Information; US Signal Corps Motion Picture Unit
- Release date: 1945
- Running time: 18 minutes
- Country: Australia
- Language: English

Australia is Like This is a 1945 documentary about the experiences of two American soldiers in Australia during World War II until they leave for battle. It takes the form of a letter written by one of the soldiers to his family in America describing Australia.

It was also known as A Letter from Australia.

The film was made for Australia and the United States, but was not released in Australia.

== Plot ==
The film is told in the form of a letter written by an American soldier and his friend on leave in Sydney. They leave a troopship and see the sights, encounter 'wrong side' traffic, and meet two Australian soldiers on leave who abandon their girlfriends to buy the Americans a beer. The Americans go to a Red Cross canteen and meet a waitress whose brother is in New Guinea. They take her to the zoo and accept a dinner invitation to her house. The troops then head north.

== Cast ==
- John McCallum as Australian soldier
- Muriel Steinbeck as mother
- Grant Taylor as Australian soldier
- Patricia Firman as waitress
- John Nugent Hayward

== Production ==
The film was one of a series of shorts made by Australia's Department of the Interior, others including Island Target.

Filming began late September 1944, using a predominantly American crew.

== Release ==
The film was completed by January 1945.
