= Michael Gordon (film editor) =

British film editor and screenwriter (1909–2008)

- Born: Michael Slingsby Gordon; 25 September 1909; Bradford, Yorkshire, England
- Died: 1 August 2008 (aged 98); Pulborough, West Sussex, England
- Occupations: Editor, Writer, Director
- Years active: 1933–1960 (film)

Michael Gordon was a British film editor and screenwriter. He also directed a couple of documentaries and the 1951 feature film Wherever She Goes.

== Selected filmography ==
- Sleeping Car (1933)
- Me and Marlborough (1935)
- The First Offence (1936)
- Seven Sinners (1936)
- His Lordship (1936)
- King Solomon's Mines (1937)
- Strange Boarders (1938)
- Climbing High (1938)
- The Sky's the Limit (1938)
- Esther Waters (1948)
- All Over the Town (1949)
- Wherever She Goes (1951)
- Malta Story (1953)
- Simba (1955)
- Safari (1956)
- The Rising of the Moon (1957)
- Night of the Demon (1957)

== Bibliography ==
- Chris Fujiwara. Jacques Tourneur: The Cinema of Nightfall. McFarland, 1998.
