= Deep and Crisp and Stolen =

1964 British television play by Dave Freeman

Deep and Crisp and Stolen is a 1964 British television play by Dave Freeman directed by Ronald Marriott. It was a Christmas season "special" featuring many cameos from British television stars of the time and aired on 21 December 1964.

== Premise ==
A gang of thieves rob a West End department store on Christmas Eve.

== Cast ==
- Raymond Francis as Chief Det. Supt. Tom Lockhart / Percy Turner
- Dennis Price as William
- Maggie Fitzgibbon as Leoni
- Robert Dorning as Manager
- George Moon as Ted
- Muriel Young as WP Sgt. Saunders
- Joan Hickson as Mrs. Caley
- Arthur Mullard as PC Muldoon
- Dennis Lotis as Bryant
- Grant Taylor as Bluey
- Frances Guthrie as Miss Burton
- Tony Quinn as Dooley
- Jack Cunningham as 1st Landlord
- John Quayle as Space pilot
- Margaret Nolan as Space hostess
- James Copeland as Security man Tom
- Jack Lynn as Security Sergeant

=== Guests ===
- Patrick Allen
- Gerald Flood
- Keith Fordyce
- Jimmy Hanley
- Sam Kydd
- Cathy McGowan
- Michael Miles
- Laurie West

== Reception ==
According to BFI Screenoline "the audience-pleasing focus of the play being the guest appearance of Detective Chief-Superintendent Lockhart (played by Raymond Francis), the hero of ITV's popular police drama No Hiding Place (1959-67)." The play was described by the Western Daily Press as a "cracking good comedy."

The Birmingham Evening Mail called it "hardly the hilarious thing it seemed intended to be." The Guardian said it was "mostly rubbish". The Daily Telegraph declared it was "a very entertaining piece of nonsense." The show was the seventeenth most popular program of the year on British television with an audience of 7.46 million.
