= Clutterbuck =

Clutterbuck is a surname.

== People ==
Notable persons include:

- Sir Alexander Clutterbuck (1897–1975), British diplomat, high commissioner to Canada and India and ambassador to Ireland
- Andrew Clutterbuck (born 1973), birth name of English actor Andrew Lincoln
- Anne Clutterbuck (born 1961), American lawyer and politician
- Beryl Markham (1902–1986), née Beryl Clutterbuck, a British-born Kenyan aviator
- Bryan Clutterbuck (born 1959), American former baseball player
- Cal Clutterbuck (born 1987), Canadian ice hockey player
- Charles Edmund Clutterbuck (1806–1861), English stained glass artist
- Sir David Clutterbuck (1913–2008), Royal Navy admiral
- Dorothy Clutterbuck (1880–1951), English society lady alleged to be associated with Gerald Gardner and the founding of Wicca
- Henry Clutterbuck (writer) (1767–1856), English physician and medical writer
- Henry Clutterbuck (cricketer) (1809–1883), English cricketer
- Henry Clutterbuck (footballer) (1873–1948), English footballer
- James Clutterbuck (born 1973), English former cricketer
- Katherine Mary Clutterbuck (1860–1946), Anglican nun and Australian education figure
- Peter Clutterbuck (1868–1951), British colonial civil servant
- Richard Clutterbuck (1917–1998), British soldier and academic, scholar of political violence
- Robert Clutterbuck (1772–1831), English antiquary and topographer
- Thomas Clutterbuck (1697–1742), British politician
- Walter Clutterbuck (1894–1987), British Army general

== The arts ==
- Fictional editor of some of Sir Walter Scott's novels, including The Monastery and The Fortunes of Nigel. The Abbot is dedicated by the "author of Waverley" to Captain Clutterbuck
- "Captain Clutterbuck's Treasure", an episode of British sitcom The Last of the Summer Wine
- Clutterbuck, a 1946 play by Benn Levy
- Alice and Fred Clutterbuck, hosts of the eponymous party in the 1968 film The Party

== See also ==
- Clatterbuck
