= Inland with Sturt =

- Directed by: Hugh McInnes
- Starring: Grant Taylor; Rod Taylor
- Distributed by: Film Australia
- Release date: 1951
- Running time: 20 mins
- Country: Australia

Inland with Sturt is a 1951 documentary from Film Australia consisting of the 1950–51 re-enactment of Captain Charles Sturt's 1829–30 expedition down the Murrumbidgee and Murray Rivers. The re-enactment was part of Australia's 1951 Commonwealth Jubilee Celebrations, commemorating 50 years of Federation.

== Production ==
The parts of Charles Sturt and George Macleay were performed by two professional actors, Grant Taylor and Rod Taylor. Several officers from Duntroon played the men who travelled with them.

The expedition took several weeks, travelling from Sydney to Adelaide. The crew travelled by road to the town of Maude, then entered the Murrumbidgee River in a whaleboat and went by water to Goolwa, after which they drove to Adelaide. All the time they wore 1830 period costume.

An extensive support crew accompanied the whaleboat from land, including Talbot Duckmanton and a team from ABC radio who would present a nightly report. The trip was also covered extensively by local media and seen by an estimated 300,000 people along the way.

Inland with Sturt marked the first film appearance for Rod Taylor, who, although he played George Macleay, was actually related to Charles Sturt through his father; he was Sturt's great-great-grandnephew. He was cast only after the original choice for his role, Charles Tingwell, pulled out to act in Kangaroo (1952).

== Cast ==
- Grant Taylor as Captain Charles Sturt
- Rod Taylor as George Macleay
- Pat Trost
- Ian Gilmore
- Roy Pugh
- Captain Jim Laughlin
- Ron Wells
- Brien Forward

== Reception ==
ABC Weekly said "All the little, intimate details of crew personalities and incident had to be sacrificed because there was notime to dwell on them, and these are the very things that would have lifted the to a more engrossing level. Still, some good effects have been achieved, and Frank Bagnall’s camera has managed... to capture the initial virginity and loneliness of the country Sturt and his men rowed or sailed past."
