= South West Pacific (film) =

- Directed by: Ken G. Hall
- Written by: Tom Gurr
- Produced by: Ken G. Hall
- Starring: Chips Rafferty; Bert Bailey; Peter Finch; Ron Randell
- Cinematography: Bert Nicholas
- Edited by: William Shepherd
- Production company: Cinesound Productions
- Distributed by: BEF
- Release dates: 12 May 1943 (Hobart); 18 June 1943 (Sydney)
- Running time: 33 mins
- Country: Australia
- Language: English

South West Pacific is a 1943 propaganda short Australian film directed by Ken G. Hall which focuses on Australia as the main Allied base in the South West Pacific area. Actors depict a cross section of Australians involved in the war effort. It has been called "the most controversial Australian film of the war."

== Plot ==
A series of everyday people talk about their contributions to the war effort. A motor mechanic speaks about how he was working happily in 1939, not thinking much of the crisis in Europe; he subsequently began making aircraft and enlisted in the Volunteer Defence Force.

The factory manager talks about how Australia has increased its industrial capacity and the high rates of tax necessary to pay for it. In peace time he was an engineer in charge of a cosmetics factory. He talks in particular about the munitions and weapons made in Australia.

Old Man Stewart, the farmer, talks about how the war interrupted his life and the importance of getting on with the job of growing food. He speaks about the female land army.

A man on a tractor, a former milkman, talks about his job building roads and aerodromes. His daughter Gwennie is working making munitions. She used to work in a beauty parlour and now pours TNT into munitions. She talks about the varied things women do in the war.

Her boyfriend Bill is in the navy. He talks about the Australia navy, the battles they lost, including the Sydney, Perth and Canberra.

Bill and Gwennie are at a cafe when they meet a merchant seaman who has survived several attacks and sinkings. He talks about the role of the merchant navy in transporting troops, munitions and food.

An RAAF pilot banters with an RAF pilot in New Guinea. They go off on a mission. An RAF mechanic and RAAF mechanic banter and worry about their pilots. Then with an American mechanic "Brooklyn" they remember the bombing of Darwin and talk about how the Allies will defeat Japan.

In the jungle, an Australian and American soldier get cut off together. The Australian soldier reminisces about service in Tobruk, Greek, Greece and the Malayan campaign. He praises his English, Indian and New Zealand allies. The Australian has a brother taken POW in Malaya, the American a brother in Bataan. They vow to get revenge on the Japanese.

The narrator then talks about Peter Lalor, the Eureka Rebellion and the vow taken at the Eureka Stockade.

== Cast ==
- Alec Kellaway as the Mechanic (the former motor mechanic)
- John Nugent-Hayward as Harry, the Factory Manager
- Bert Bailey as Old Man Stewart, the Farmer
- Bill Perryman as the Road Builder
- Muriel Steinbeck as Gwennie, the Munition Worker
- Walter Pym as Bill, the Sailor
- George Randall as the Merchant Seaman
- Peter Finch as the RAAF pilot
- Ralph Smart as the RAF pilot
- Joe Valli as the RAF mechanic
- Chips Rafferty as the RAAF mechanic
- Wayne Froman as USAC mechanic
- Grant Taylor as AIF soldier
- Ron Randell as US soldier

== Production ==
Various actors were granted leave from the armed services to appear in the movie, including Gunner Peter Finch, Sgt. Ron Taylor, LAC Chips Rafferty, PO Ralph Smart, Joe Valli, Ron Randell and Sergeant-Major Walter Pym and Squadron Leader George Randall.

Jungle scenes were reconstructed in Cinesound's studio under the supervision of Damien Parer. The US Army lent fighting equipment for battle scenes. To add realism to sequences live ammunition was used.

Ken Hall later said he wanted to use professional actors rather than real workers and farmers "to give the film a professional finish, and that the majority of them were real-life war workers, either in the services, or in essential industry."

Prime Minister John Curtin wrote a special foreword for the film which stated that the film:

Was made to give the people of Great Britain, America, Soviet Russia, and the United Nations some accurate idea of Australia at war. The Commonwealth Government has released this film for exhibition throughout Australia, in the feeling that every citizen will take pride in a record of national achievement. You are about to see a motion picture which you helped to make as a member of thee fighting forces, as a worker on the home front, as a tacpayer, as a buyer of war bonds.

== Release ==
The film had its first public screening in Hobart on 12 May when Senator Bill Ashley, the then-Minister for Information, showed it after giving a talk.

The film premiered to commercial audiences in Sydney at the Lyceum Theatre in Sydney in June 1943. It had been passed without cuts by the government censor, but the word "bloody", which was spoken twice in the jungle scenes, was removed by a cleric who ran the Lyceum.

The Bulletin called it "excellent... The Australian voices are as distinctive in it as the clear atmosphere and the eucalypts... The Americans and English for whom the film is intended will see the best exposition yet sent abroad of our war effort, our vast spaces (and let me get this in: I’m thinking of standing for a Federal seat), our rural and other industries and, above all, the potentialities still awaiting development."

The Sydney Daily Telegraph called it "a grand job" with Rafferty being "the finest piece of telling playing to the film". However although the critic thought the movie was "Strong on propaganda, on magnificent photography, on commentary, and on Ken Hall's smooth production" he thought using "well-known actors to play the typical Australians" was "a dangerous device" as some of the cast "mug their parts."

The Sydney Morning Herald called the film:

One of the best, and certainly the most comprehensive, of the propaganda films yet made here. Well written, yet not – without some trace of the bombast, which unfortunately seems characteristic of so many of our propaganda film narratives, the picture graphically reviews our national contribution to the Allied cause. More engrossing than a major screen story, it outlines an amazing achievement, one which audiences here will find is much greater and more versatile than they had imagined.... The acting on the whole is so convincing and the varied Australian types so well portrayed that it would be unfair to single out any particular player for mention. Here is a picture that every Australian should see.

=== Political controversy ===
A special screening of the movie for Members of Parliament and other special guests took place in July. The screening did not go well: reportedly several MPs laughed at sequences and walked out of the theatre. The general consensus was the film compared poorly to its companion feature, Desert Victory (1943), and should not have used actors instead of real people.

According to a journalist from the Brisbane Sunday Mail who was present at the screening, one viewer said it had "enough ham to feed the whole Australian army". The journalist went on to criticise the film:

The artificiality of the sequences, false values, false sentiments, and complacency of the whole film made almost a painful impression on many of the vice regal, diplomatic and parliamentary audiences upstairs at the theatre. Downstairs, where the audience comprised soldiers, mostly taken from the front line to attend a special training school at Duntroon, there was loud laughter at some scenes intended to be impressive. There was no smell of battle in the film as in the wonderful Desert Victory, which had preceded it. There were no actors and no politics in Desert Victory, only fighters and workers. There were only actors and a strong political flavour in South-west Pacific... Any audience ran be forgiven for laughing in the wrong place. In the search for lightness and brightness, comedy has been over emphasised. The film misses a glorious opportunity to show some thing of the real work of Australian soldiers.

The movie was then released in Adelaide. The Adelaide Advertiser said it should not be exported:

Despite the excellence of its pictorial matter, its sentiment is out of key, it is boastful, and its characters talk incessantly. Some of the characters employed are more caricatures or comedians than average Australian people (Bert Bailey is there in his Dad part of On Our Selection fame), and the servicemen types are quite inadequate. The pictorial representation of factory development, of farm and pasture, and of the Allied Works Council projects, is good, but in all else Producer-Director Ken G. Hall has made a far too low assessment of the intelligence of his prospective audiences.

However, a critic from the Hobart Mercury liked the film, writing that "Script is direct, forceful. Photography good. Worth seeing." The Adelaide News thought the film had good and bad points:

It is undoubtedly comprehensive for a 3,000-ft. film. Producer-Director Ken G.Hall and commentator Tom Gurr have snapshotted Australia's war effort from a good many angles. They seem out of perspective at times. 'Tough! Of course it's tough.' booms the voice of Australia. No-it's not one of Damien Parer's sweaty heroes from "Road to Kokoda" speaking, but the ex manager of a cosmetics factory talking about his taxes. The emphasis throughout is on the home front, its trials, and Its achievements, the last' described with a complacency that's naive and perhaps ill judged in a film intended for export. Even so, as a home-front documentary the film has a good deal to commend it, except that the workers portrayed are an over-clean and actorish lot. Not enough footage is given to servicemen. Those who do appear are stock types.

The Adelaide Mail reported that:

Points in its favor... were its crisp photography, clear commentary, economical dove-tailing of sequences showing many aspects of war work, and its patient sincerity in trying to give industrial war workers a pride in their jobs. On the debit side were a naive boastfulness ('things we taught the Allied Nations'), emphasis on the amateur aspect of Australia's war work (plenty about factory operatives who used to make and sell cosmetics, but not a word about the sizeable heavy industries operating for years), too much home front, too little front line, and too many of those old familiar faces — like 'Dad' Bert Bailey — from screen and vaudeville. There seemed to be a feeling of 'Dad 'n' Dave' in types and dialogue right through the film.... Summary — 'South-West Pacific' good enough as a civilian morale booster, for home consumption, but definitely not for export.

=== Arthur Fadden complaint ===
The film was subsequently screened by Senator Ashley, after a speaking engagement in Brisbane, Queensland during which Ashley praised the achievements of the Curtin government, and claimed the film illustrated these.

The then-leader of the opposition, Arthur Fadden, complained that the movie was being used for electioneering purposes (it was near the time of the 1943 election) and asked for it to be withdrawn from distribution.

=== Film withdrawn ===
Despite Ashley's protests, Curtin ordered that all future screenings of South West Pacific be stopped, and the movie be replaced by an entirely new documentary to be made later. Curtin claimed this was not because of Fadden's complaint, but due to his belief that South West Pacific was not sufficiently realistic and vivid to do justice to Australian services fighting in the South-west Pacific area; he wanted a better portrayal of the war in this zone, with more emphasis on fighting troops.

Curtin later stated "I make it clear that the decision to make what I have described as a better film than South-west Pacific in no way reflects on the ability of Cinesound Productions Ltd. as producers of motion pictures. That company was asked to do a Pacific film and it did so in accordance with the specifications given to it."

Queensland Theatres Ltd then wrote to Curtin requesting that they continue to be allowed to show the film and Curtin said he would have another look at it.

The government later made Jungle Patrol (1944), set during the Markham, Ramu and Finisterre campaigns, which used real soldiers and emphasised fighting troops. It was made by Tom Gurr who wrote South West Pacific.

Doc Evatt took a copy of the film to the US and Britain.

=== Later reputation ===
Filmink magazine wrote that the plot involving Steinbeck was strong enough for a feature. The same magazine declared "While Ken G. Hall directs with customary skill, the device of getting actors to talk to the camera in monologues pretending to be real people feels a little silly, not helped by their florid self-conscious dialogue... Still, the film isn’t so bad that it needed to be withdrawn. There’s some excellent acting and photography. Sociologically the movie is fascinating."
