= Alan Osbiston =

British film editor

- Born: 7 May 1914; Crows Nest, New South Wales
- Died: 1971 (aged 56–57); Twickenham, Middlesex, UK
- Occupation: Film editor
- Notable work: The Guns of Navarone
- Spouse: Lyla Cranston (m. 1942)
- Relatives: Max Osbiston (cousin)
- Awards: Academy Award for Best Film Editing (1962)

Alan Brigstocke Osbiston (7 May 1914 – 1971) was a British film editor. He was nominated for the Academy Award for Best Film Editing in 1962 for The Guns of Navarone.

== History ==
Osbiston was born in Crows Nest, New South Wales, to Charles Alan and Emily Florence "Bae" Osbiston, née Brigstocke of Brockley Farm, Mount Druitt, New South Wales.

Osbiston attended "Shore School" and for much of his early life lived in Chatswood, Sydney.

Prior to joining the British Ministry of Information, Osbiston worked for Cinesound in Sydney.

== Personal ==
Osbiston married Lyla Cranston of London, on 15 August 1942 in London.

He was a cousin of Australian actor Max Osbiston (7 August 1914 – 12 March 1981).

== Selected filmography (as editor) ==
- The Laughing Lady (1946)
- Against the Wind (1948)
- Twist of Fate (1954) (U.S. ' Beautiful Stranger ')
- Footsteps in the Fog (1955)
- The End of the Affair (1955)
- Manuela (1957)
- Time Without Pity (1957)
- A Touch of Larceny (1959)
- The Challenge (1960)
- The Entertainer (1960)
- The Guns of Navarone (1961)
- Lord Jim (1965)
- Duffy (1968)
- Three into Two Won't Go (1969)
- Toomorrow (1970)
