= Max Osbiston =

Australian actor (1914–1981)

- Born: Maxwell Hamilton Osbiston; 7 August 1914; Sydney, Australia
- Died: 12 March 1981 (aged 66)
- Education: Yanco Agricultural High School, North Sydney Boys High School
- Occupation: Actor
- Family: Alan Brigstocke Osbiston (cousin)

Maxwell Hamilton Osbiston (7 August 1914 – 12 March 1981) was an Australian actor, active in radio, stage, film and television.

== Early life ==
Osbiston was born in Sydney, the son of Frank and Iolanthe Osbiston (née Margoliouth) of Cremorne, New South Wales.

He spent three years at the Agricultural School at Yanco, followed by North Sydney High School. He left school during the Great Depression, and with difficulty found employment delivering bread, and spent some time panning for gold in the Central West. On his return to Sydney he found employment as a traveler for a firm selling dentists' supplies, and remained in this business for four years.

== Career ==
Osbiston had been attracted to the stage from schooldays, and in 1935 joined Doris Fitton's Independent Theatre, appearing in The Late Christopher Bean (Emlyn Williams) in October 1935, The Three Sisters (Anton Chekhov) in September 1936, Hassan (James Elroy Flecker) in March 1937, and Boy Meets Girl (Samuel and Bella Spewack) in November 1937.

During much of this time he was also acting in radio plays for the Australian Broadcasting Commission, and in January 1938 he was signed to a one-year contract. His most enduring, though minor, role was in Blue Hills as Dr Peter Frobisher. He was one of three (with Patricia Crocker and Queenie Ashton) who took part in both the first and last episodes (28 February 1949 and 30 September 1976). He had roles in hundreds of radio dramas.

His professional stage career started with a small part in Of Mice and Men at the Minerva, which did not go unnoticed, and followed with French Without Tears at the same theatre, for which he received the highest accolades. Both plays were produced by Harvey Adams.

Osbiston served with the RAAF during WWII, but details are hard to find, though he may have attained the rank of flight lieutenant.

He was the romantic male lead in the film The Phantom Stockman.

== Selected appearances ==
=== Film ===
| Year | Title | Role | Notes | Ref. |
|---|---|---|---|---|
| 1941 | The Power and the Glory | Flight Leader | | |
| 1953 | The Phantom Stockman | Frank McLeod | | |
| 1954 | His Majesty O'Keefe | | | |
| 1960 | The Sundowners | Farm Couple | | |
| 1961 | Bungala Boys | Reg Phelan | | |
| 1978 | Little Boy Lost | Inspector James | | |

=== Television ===
| Year | Title | Role | Notes | Ref. |
|---|---|---|---|---|
| 1959 | Act of Violence | | TV play | |
| 1960 | Thunder on Sycamore Street | | TV play | |
| 1960 | The Square Ring | Watty | TV play | |
| 1960 | The Life and Death of King Richard II | Lord Willoughby | TV movie | |
| 1961 | Whiplash | Gillespie / Garth Blake | 2 episodes | |
| 1961 | The Outcasts | Edward Eagar | Miniseries, 1 episode | |
| 1962 | Consider Your Verdict | Kevin Tressell | 1 episode | |
| 1963 | Time Out | Robert O’Hara Burke | 1 episode | |
| 1965 | The Magic Boomerang | George Duffy | 1 episode | |
| 1965 | The Stranger | Telescope Technician | Miniseries, 2 episodes | |
| 1966 | Australian Playhouse | | Episode 7: "Getting Along with the Government" | |
| 1966–1973 | Homicide | Various roles | 14 episodes | |
| 1968 | Skippy the Bush Kangaroo | Dr Morton | 1 episode | |
| 1968; 1969 | Hunter | Foster / Mason | 2 episodes | |
| 1969–1973 | Division 4 | Jim Roberts / Nobby King / Det. Insp. Roche / Robinson / Maurie Brown / Bullock / Warren Nash / William Harris | 8 episodes | |
| 1970 | The Long Arm | Charlie Hall | 1 episode | |
| 1971 | Dynasty | Thomson | 1 episode | |
| 1971 | The Godfathers | | 1 episode | |
| 1971–1975 | Matlock Police | Ralph Donaldson / Marshall / The District Inspector / Charles Wilson / Father Dawson / Harold Mason / Danny Hunt / Bull Ballard / Mr Robinson | 9 episodes | |
| 1972 | Spyforce | Sir Roland Jensen | 1 episode | |
| 1972–1973 | Around the World in Eighty Days | Mr Fix (voice) | Animated series, 16 episodes | |
| 1973 | Boney | McDonald Snr | 1 episode | |
| 1973 | Ryan | Lynch | 1 episode | |
| 1974 | 27A | Frederick Parsons | TV movie | |
| 1974 | Our Man in the Company | Bruce | 1 episode | |
| 1974 | Silent Number | | 1 episode | |
| 1974 | Escape from Singapore | | TV docudrama movie | |
| 1974; 1975 | Behind the Legend | | Anthology series, 2 episodes | |
| 1975 | Last Rites | | TV movie | |
| 1975 | Ben Hall | Buchanan | Miniseries, 2 episodes | |
| 1975 | Shannon's Mob | Samuels | 1 episode | |
| 1972–1975 | Number 96 | Charles / Sergeant Murphy | 3 episodes | |
| 1976 | Secret Doors | | TV movie | |
| 1976 | Arena | Parsons | TV movie | |
| 1976 | The Bushranger | | TV movie | |
| 1977 | Chopper Squad | Rodney Coombs | 1 episode | |
| 1977 | Moby-Dick | | TV movie | |
| 1978 | Glenview High | Inspector | 1 episode | |
| 1978 | Little Boy Lost | Inspector James | TV movie | |
| 1978 | Case for the Defence | Proudfoot | 9 episodes | |
| 1979 | A Place in the World | | Miniseries, 1 episode | |
| 1979 | Cop Shop | Fred Daniels / Supt Reg Lane | 3 episodes | |
| 1980 | Spring & Fall | Doctor | Anthology series, 1 episode | |

=== Theatre ===
| Year | Title | Role | Notes | Ref. |
|---|---|---|---|---|
| 1934 | Macbeth | | Criterion Theatre, Sydney | |
| 1935 | The Late Christopher Bean | | Independent Theatre, Sydney | |
| 1936 | The Three Sisters | | Independent Theatre, Sydney | |
| 1937 | Hassan | | Independent Theatre, Sydney | |
| 1937 | Boy Meets Girl | | Independent Theatre, Sydney | |
| 1940 | Of Mice and Men | | Minerva Theatre, Sydney | |
| 1940 | French Without Tears | | Minerva Theatre, Sydney | |
| 1941 | Susan and God | Clyde | Her Majesty's Theatre, Melbourne with J. C. Williamson's | |
| 1958 | Curly on the Rack | Harry | Elizabethan Theatre, Sydney | |
| 1963–1964 | The Private Ear / The Public Eye | | Phillip St Theatre, Sydney | |
| 1965; 1977 | The Business of Good Government. A Modern Nativity Play | | Scots Church, Sydney with Q Theatre | |
| 1969 | Canterbury Tales | Chaucer | Comedy Theatre, Melbourne with J. C. Williamson's | |
| 1973–1974 | What If You Died Tomorrow? | | Sydney Opera House, Elizabethan Theatre, Sydney, Canberra Theatre, Comedy Theatre, Melbourne, Comedy Theatre, London | |
| 1974 | That Championship Season | | UNSW Parade Theatre, Sydney | |
| 1977 | The Magistrate | | Sydney Opera House | |

=== Radio ===
| Year | Title | Role | Notes | Ref. |
|---|---|---|---|---|
| 1937 | As Ye Sow | Gilbert | ABC Radio series | |
| 1937 | Fly by Night | Edward Blaine | ABC Radio series | |
| 1937–1953 | Dad and Dave from Snake Gully | Dave | 4BK / 4AK series | |
| Pre-1938 | Heroisms All Around Us | | | |
| 1938 | The Three Diggers | Jim | 2BL series | |
| 1940 | French Without Tears | | 2GB series | |
| 1940s–1950s | Drama of Medicine | | Grace Gibson Productions series on 2UW | |
| 1942 | The Blackburns Take Over | Jeffrey Blackburn | | |
| 1945–1954 | The Air Adventures of Biggles | Algy | AWA series on 2GB | |
| 1946 | Invisible Circus | Bradley McGhee | ABC Radio series | |
| 1947 | Crime and Punishment | | Macquarie Network series | |
| 1949–1976 | Blue Hills | Dr Peter Frobisher | ABC Radio series | |
| 1950s | Dragnet | | Grace Gibson Productions series on 2GB | |
| 1950s | My Heart's Desire | | AWA series on 4IP | |
| 1950s | Timber Ridge | | AWA series on 3XY / 3TR | |
| 1950s–1960s | Diamonds of Death | Mark Sherwood | | |
| 1950s–1960s | Life in the Balance | | ARP series | |
| 1952 | The Explorers | | 2BL / ABC Radio series | |
| 1954 | The Dam Busters | Mick Martin | 2UE series | |
| c1954– | Stairway to Fame | | ARC series | |
| 1956 | The White Rabbit | Hutchison | Australasian Radio Productions / Grace Gibson Productions series on 2UE | |
| 1956 | The Clock | Fred / The Sergeant | Grace Gibson Productions series on 3XY, episode 33: "Behind the Mask", episode 35: "Flaming Frances" | |
| 1957 | Carter Brown Mysteries | | Grace Gibson Productions series, episode: "Curves for a Coroner" | |
| 1957–1960 | Big Sister | Perry | Macquarie / Artransa series, season 2 | |
| 1958 | Phantom Time | Narrator (introduction) | Fidelity series | |
| 1960s | No Rainbow in the Sky | Jack Morrison | AWA series | |
| 1965 | The Square Ring | Proudfoot | | |
| 1970s | Without Shame | Grimes | Grace Gibson Productions series on 3LK | |
| c.1972 | I Christopher Macaulay | | Grace Gibson Productions series | |
| | Adopted Son | Bruce Conway | Grace Gibson Productions series | |
| | Beyond the Rainbow | Jack Morrison | AWA series | |
| | The Broken Circle | Howard Cartwright | Fidelity series | |
| | Radio Cab | | Fidelity series | |
| | Walk a Crooked Mile | Pomeroy | Donovan Joyce series | |

== Personal life ==
Osbiston married Beulah 'Babs' Mayhew of Ermington, New South Wales sometime around early 1939. They had appeared together as a couple in the radio series As Ye Sow, and continued to work on the same shows wherever possible, Mrs Osbiston continuing to appear as 'Babs Mayhew'.

Max Osbiston was a cousin of film editor Alan Brigstocke Osbiston (7 May 1914 – 1971) — see chart below.

== Family ==
Three children of Samuel Osbiston of Ryburgh, Norfolk, England found their way to Australia. Several descendants were prominent in banking, mining and the arts in Sydney:

- Frank Frederic Osbiston (c. 1843 – 23 April 1902) mine manager; worked in America, died at Coolgardie, Western Australia.
- Robert Osbiston of Campbelltown (c. 1846 – 16 November 1898) economist, secretary of the Bankers Institute, married Sarah Elizabeth Ann "Annie" Finch on 23 December 1871 in Chelsea, London.

- (Robert) Newton Osbiston (c. 1872 – 24 February 1902) married Susan Jane "Susie" Allison on 7 February 1900. She married again, to Arthur Smith of Cheviot Hills Station, Drake, New South Wales

- Frances Allison Osbiston ( – ) married Alexander Wyatt Martin on 19 February 1927

- Ann Osbiston (1874–1964)
- Francis "Frank" Osbiston (16 September 1876 – 16 May 1953). He married Iolanthe Yolande Lindsay Margoliouth of New Zealand on 23 December 1911, lived at Cremorne.

- Francis Robert "Bob" Osbiston (25 January 1913 – ) served as war correspondent for the Sydney Truth and Daily Mirror. He married Winifred Joan Collins, daughter of painter and broadcaster Albert Collins, on 30 April 1938 and had two children. They divorced in 1946. She married again, to Neville Ballard Lewis on 16 February 1948.
- Maxwell Hamilton Osbiston (7 August 1914 – 12 March 1981) married Beulah "Babs" Mayhew (died 2004) early in 1939.

- daughter (18 July 1944 – )
- Karen Osbiston (c. 1946 – )

- Judith Lindsay Osbiston (5 September 1917 – ) married John Rorke, lived in Arcadia, New South Wales.
- David John Osbiston (5 October 1918 – 18 September 1996)
- Michael Osbiston ( – ) youngest son of Frank, was another actor. (Check SMH 26 May 1962 p.68)

- Charles Alan Osbiston (c. 1881–c. 1957) married Emily Florence Brigstocke on 6 July 1912

- Alan Brigstocke Osbiston (7 May 1914 – 1971) of Chatswood married Lyla Cranston on 17 June 1943

- William Osbiston (c. July 1883 – 16 November 1939) served with 1st AIF

- Maude Osbiston (c. 1850 – 16 April 1923), died at Waterfall, New South Wales
