= Another Threshold =

- Directed by: Ken G. Hall
- Written by: Michael Terry
- Produced by: Ken G. Hall
- Starring: Grant Taylor; Peter Finch; Joe Valli; Muriel Steinbeck; Pat Firman
- Production companies: Cinesound Productions; Department of Information
- Distributed by: BEF
- Release date: 5 September 1942
- Running time: 10 minutes
- Country: Australia
- Language: English

Another Threshold is a 1942 Australian propaganda short film directed by Ken G. Hall and starring Peter Finch.

It was produced for the Austerity Loan Campaign and features an appearance by then Prime Minister John Curtin.

== Premise ==
An Australian family have lost a son in action and discuss whether it was worth it. The father (Joe Valli) is a World War One veteran. One family member (Peter Finch) has returned from war service in the Air Force. Another (Grant Taylor) is in the army.

== Cast ==
- Grant Taylor (billed as "Ron Taylor") as the army lieutenant
- Peter Finch as the sergeant pilot
- Joe Valli as the father
- Muriel Steinbeck as the nurse
- Pat Firman
- Connie Martin as the mother

== Reception ==
The Sydney Morning Herald wrote that:

The film's appeal from this angle is anything but forceful. In an amiable discussion that lacks strength and conviction because of its generalities and cliches, an average Australian family and some of their friends from the fighting forces review the situation in Australia today. They find much to be proud of in the country's war effort, despite certain elements of complacency in the community. In the general summing up, in a much too rambling and superficial argument, "squealers", "slackers", "lounge lizards", hoarders, blackmarket operator, and the rest of their kind are found to be very small fry when weighed in the balance against those who are earnestly doing their share in the struggle for victory... [a]rather too conscious effort.

The Mercury said "the film is well produced and presented."

Smith's Weekly called it "another excellent documentary for the Dept of Information" in which "refreshing candor marks the dialogue in which lack of effort by all classes of people comes in for censure. Mr. Hall's fearlessness is, In fact, to be as highly commended as his management of the film, which should certainly make the lazy minded think. Of the actors Joe Valli is the easiest and perhaps the most true to life, but Peter Finch turns in an outstanding job."

The Daily Telegraph called it "ingeniously drawn, well-acted (Joe Valli is superb)... although a trifle over-dialogued, the film is the most vivid, most characteristic, of Australia's wartime shorts."
