= A Soldier for Christmas =

British play

- Written by: Reginald Beckwith
- Original language: English
- Genre: Comedy
- Setting: Southern England, 1942

Premiere
- Date premiered: 6 October 1944
- Place premiered: Playhouse Theatre, London

A Soldier for Christmas is a 1944 comedy play by the British actor and playwright Reginald Beckwith. It was staged twice in London's West End that year. Between 3 February and 22 April it ran at Wyndham's Theatre before transferring to the Vaudeville Theatre where it continued between 25 April and 8 July, running for a total of 181 performances. It was then revived and ran for a further 34 performances at the Playhouse Theatre between 6 October and 4 November 1944. The West End cast included Trevor Howard, Robert Beatty, Joyce Barbour, Joan Harben and Jane Cain.

== Synopsis ==
Mrs Ferguson issues an invitation to a local Canadian Army base for one of the soldiers to spend Christmas with them. When he arrives he finds the house overwhelmed with the emotional issues of both of the Ferguson's daughters, plus a WAAF girl who has been billeted on them. The arrival of the easygoing Canadian leads to further turmoil in the Ferguson household.

== Film adaptation ==
In 1946 it was adapted into a film This Man Is Mine by the British branch of Columbia Pictures. Directed by Marcel Varnel it starred Tom Walls, Nova Pilbeam and Glynis Johns.

== Bibliography ==
- Goble, Alan. The Complete Index to Literary Sources in Film. Walter de Gruyter, 1999.
- Wearing, J.P. The London Stage 1940–1949: A Calendar of Productions, Performers, and Personnel. Rowman & Littlefield, 2014.
