= Rajmund Kanelba =

Polish painter

Raymond Kanelba (1897–1960), also known as Rajmund Kanelba, was a 20th-century Polish painter.

He was born in Warsaw and educated there as well as in Vienna and Paris. He was strongly influenced by the école de Paris but with rather realistic and anti-impressionist style. In 1926 his works were on display in Salon des Indépendants and Salon d'Automne and in 1952 he had a large exposition of his paintings in New York City.

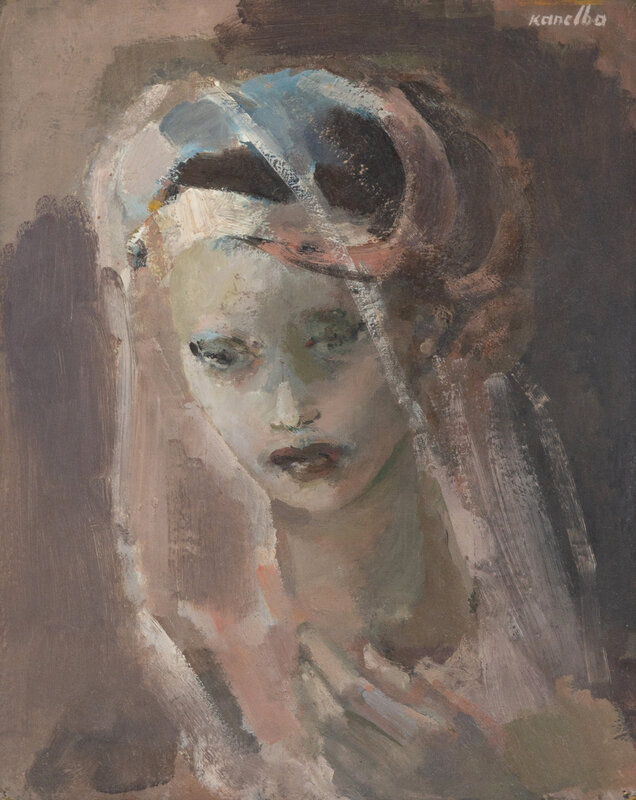
Portrait of a Young Woman

He was especially admired for his portraits of women, as well as his paintings of flowers, interiors, and street scenes. Some of his works were signed as Raymond Kanelba.

In 1955, the painter traveled to England, where he undertook the most important commission of his career – at the request of the Grenadier Regiment, he painted a portrait of Queen Elizabeth II.

Rajmund Kanelba lived most of his life in France but died in London in July 1960.
