= Henry Clutterbuck (cricketer) =

English cleric and cricketer

Henry Robert Clutterbuck
- Born: 22 November 1809
- Died: 18 December 1883 (aged 74)
- Occupation: cricketer

Henry Robert Clutterbuck (22 November 1809 – 18 December 1883) was an English cleric, and a cricketer who represented Oxford University. A batsman of unknown handedness who was born in Great Stanmore, Middlesex, Clutterbuck made one appearance for the University when facing the Marylebone Cricket Club in July 1832 at Lord's. He batted at number 10, scoring one before being dismissed by William Lillywhite, followed by a duck in the second innings. The MCC were victorious by four wickets. He died in Bath, Somerset in 1883.

Clutterbuck was educated at Harrow School and Peterhouse, Cambridge, where he graduated B.A. in 1831. He became a Church of England priest and was vicar of Kempston, Bedfordshire, 1835–46 and of Buckland Dinham, Somerset, 1848–83. He did not study at Oxford, although the University awarded him an ad eundem degree in 1858.
