= Waratah Park =

Fauna sanctuary

- Location within Sydney
- Location: 13 Namba Road, Duffys Forest, Northern Beaches Council, New South Wales, Australia
- Coordinates: 33°40′34″S 151°10′51″E
- Etymology: Waratah; (Telopea speciosissima)
- Owner: Metropolitan Local Aboriginal Land Council

New South Wales Heritage Register
- Official name: Waratah Park; Skippy the bush kangaroo - television set; TV set; Duffy's Forrest
- Type: State heritage (landscape)
- Designated: 27 February 2015
- Reference no.: 1944
- Type: Cultural Feature
- Category: Landscape - Cultural

Waratah Park is a heritage-listed former Aboriginal land and fauna sanctuary and now Aboriginal title claim at 13 Namba Road, Duffys Forest in the Northern Beaches Council local government area of New South Wales, Australia. It is also known for serving as the fictional Waratah National Park, the filming location for the Australian television series Skippy the Bush Kangaroo (produced from 1967 to 1969), when the area was still undeveloped Crown land. After the series ended, the Crown land remained mostly undeveloped, with the government granting management of the area to a series of operators until August 2014, when the government passed full ownership of the land to the Metropolitan Local Aboriginal Land Council. It was added to the New South Wales State Heritage Register on 27 February 2015.

== History ==
=== Aboriginal land ===
Waratah Park is sited adjacent to Ku-ring-gai Chase National Park in which some Indigenous sites have been dated as older than 7,400 years.

Waratah Park is located within the traditional lands of the Dharug-speaking peoples of the greater Sydney Basin. "Before the colonisation of Australia in 1788, this nation of Aboriginal people lived from Broken Bay in the north to Sydney Harbour in the south. Two clans occupied the area that is now the national park: the Garrigal people, who lived around West Head and down to the coast, and the Terramerragal, who lived in the Turramurra area.".

Within six weeks of the arrival of the British First Fleet in Sydney, Governor Phillip was exploring Broken Bay near Waratah Park. He commented on the friendliness of the Aboriginal people but when he returned a year later, all except those too sick with smallpox fled from him. By the 1840s, few Aboriginal people were noted living in a traditional lifestyle in this region.

Today, Aboriginal people live in this vicinity and more widely across the Sydney community. The National Heritage listed Ku-ring-gai National Park, adjacent to Waratah Park, has cultural significance for its natural landscape and for the many Aboriginal sites found in the park.

=== History of site since European occupation ===
In the early 19th century, European colonisers used the Ku-ring-gai area for timber-getting and boat building. They also collected materials such as soda ash, salt and shell lime.

In the 1880s Ku-ring-gai Chase National Park, adjacent to Waratah Park became the earliest reserve for nature conservation in Australia after Eccleston Du Faur successfully lobbied the New South Wales Government to protect its native flora from the threat of expanding settlement.

The lot now known as Waratah Park was not included in the national park at that time, probably because it was in an area subject to Railway Reserve 63, but it remained undeveloped Crown land.

==== Skippy the Bush Kangaroo ====
In 1967 a large swathe of undeveloped Crown land west of Namba Road, including the lot now known as Waratah Park became the fictitious "Waratah National Park", a film location for the internationally renowned television series "Skippy the Bush Kangaroo". Filming commenced in May 1967 following preparatory work including obtaining permission from the NSW State Government to occupy the Crown land and consent from Warringah Council to use the site as a film location.

Also necessary was the cooperation of the NSW National Parks & Wildlife Service and the Ku-ring-gai Chase Trust to allow access to a further 202 hectares (500 acres) within the adjacent Ku-ring-gai National Park. The Ranger Headquarters and residence was purpose-built for the series and used for both exterior and interior scenes. Power and water supply had to be connected and roads constructed, together with a helipad and helicopter servicing area. Other national parks were also utilised for filming, as well as the streets and beaches of Sydney and surrounding districts. "The Australian bush provided an excellent scenic backdrop, which was much appreciated by local and overseas viewers alike."

Head Ranger of the park was Matt Hammond, played by Ed Devereaux, an accomplished actor who had appeared in many film and television roles. In the series, Matt Hammond was a widower in his early 40s with two sons, 16-year-old Mark played by Ken James, and 9-year-old Sonny played by Garry Pankhurst. Sonny's constant companion was Skippy, the bush kangaroo, in the title role. Skippy was not a pet and it was often reiterated in the series that Skippy lived in the park and was free to come and go as she pleased. Skippy was found in the bush as a baby by Sonny - an orphan, her mother having been killed by shooters. It was always understood that once Skippy was old enough to look after herself she would go back to the bush, but a strong bond had been built up between Skippy and Sonny and the rest of the Hammond family. Skippy was a remarkable kangaroo. Capable of near-human thought and reasoning, she could understand everyone, open doors, carry things in her pouch, cross streams on narrow logs, foil villains, rescue hapless bushwalkers, untie ropes, collect the mail and even operate the radio.

The Skippy TV series was produced from 1967 to 1969, and broadcast from 1968 to 1970. A 1969 feature film, entitled "The Intruders" or "Skippy And The Intruders", was largely filmed on the Waratah Park set as well as near the East Gippsland town of Mallacoota. "Basically a feature-length episode, the movie was seen as a good rollicking adventure yarn and was well-received by Skippy fans."

==== After Skippy ====
After production of the series ceased, Warringah Council granted land use access for Waratah Park to be used as an "animal park and entertainment area" in December 1969. Ed Devereaux was at the official opening in January 1970, appearing in uniform as Matt Hammond. Initially operated by Fauna Productions, the management of the park changed hands over the years, being held by Waratah Park Pty Ltd from 1976 and by Waratah Park Earth Sanctuary from 1995 to 2000. Visitors could see kangaroos and other wildlife including koalas, dingoes, emus and wombats. Visitors could also see the home of Skippy by walking through the Ranger Headquarters and seeing the film set used for interior scenes, still in situ.

Waratah Park operated as a tourism venue for over 35 years. In 2006 the business failed and the park was closed. In 2010, the Minister for Lands cancelled the lease to Melbourne-based company Prudentia Investments. By then all wildlife had been removed from the park.

In October 2011 NSW Crown Lands issued with a 'Letter of Authority" to Duffys Forest Residents Association over Waratah Park for "temporary occupation of crown land to undertake beautification, eradication of noxious weeds, hazard reduction /bushfire prevention at Duffys Forest." A submission in favour of SHR listing of Waratah Park from Jenny Harris, Secretary of the Duffys Forest Residents Association dated 21 October 2014 stated:

Duffys Forest Residents Association (DFRA) has been working tirelessly with volunteers from outside the community since November 2010 (under a Letter of Authority from Crown Lands) to suppress weeds and to support and promote resilience of bushland across the site. We have developed a significant database of volunteers now exceeding 150 people who volunteer at regular monthly working bees because of their emotional attachment to the "Home of Skippy". Volunteer contributions have exceeded 3500 hours since work began and the passion of these volunteers epitomizes community sentiment that the home of Skippy should be preserved in perpetuity for all Australians and international visitors.'

A land claim on Waratah Park as Crown Land under the NSW Aboriginal Land Rights Act 1983 was successful and on 28 August 2014, ownership of Waratah Park was transferred to the Metropolitan Local Aboriginal Council (Metro LALC). Metro LALC have plans to re-develop Waratah Park as centre for Aboriginal and environmental education. The Land Council has been restoring the park, working with the Duffys Forest Residents' Association, using occasions such as National Tree Day (with Planet Ark, each July) to encourage community tree planting and activity on site.

== Description ==
Waratah Park comprised 12.6 hectares (31 acres) of bushland adjoining Ku-Ring-Gai National Park in Duffys Forest Reserve, near Sydney's northern beaches. Within the site are several built elements:

1. The Ranger Headquarters building dating from 1967 including the Skippy TV set of moveable heritage. Merchandise and some other items on site from more recent operations at Waratah Park as a tourism venue may be regarded as part of the collection;
2. In the close vicinity of the Rangers Headquarters is small adjoining service building, a large undercover BBQ area, a large shed with contemporary farm equipment and a play equipment area;
3. A large octagonal building probably dating from the 1970s which serves as a gatehouse and display area;
4. Two modest demountable residences with an associated shed;
5. Remnants of wildlife enclosures and electrified fencing.

Of these elements, only the Rangers Headquarters building and with its moveable heritage Skippy TV set, all set within its bush-land context, are considered to be of State heritage significance.

Bushland

The site adjoins Ku-Ring-Gai National Park. There are multiple recordings of threatened flora and fauna species on Waratah Park and adjacent lands. The following species have been recorded on or near Waratah Park and are highly likely to be onsite:

Flora

- Epacris purpurascens var. purpurascens, coastal heath/native fuchsia
- Tetratheca glandulosa, heath
- Melaleuca deanii, Deane's honey bracelet myrtle/paperbark
- Pimelea curvifolia
- Lasiopetalum joyaceae
- Grevillea caleyi, Caley's spider flower
- Eucalyptus camfieldii, Camfield's gum

Fauna

- Glossy black cockatoo
- Southern brown bandicoot
- Eastern pygmy possum
- heath monitor
- New Holland mouse
- red-crowned toadlet
- powerful owl
- giant burrowing frog

=== Condition ===
As at 21 March 2012, the Ranger Headquarters building is in sound physical condition although somewhat run-down. The Skippy set within the Ranger Headquarters building has undergone basic conservation by ICS in 2014. The set is now stored elsewhere while the building is made more secure for its long-term exhibition. The bushland setting for the Rangers Headquarters is considered significant to this listing. The bushland vulnerable to the effects of weeds and feral animals and in recent years has been cared for by the Duffys Forest Residents Association DFRA under a "letter of authority" from Crown Lands. In 2012 DFRA successfully obtained a $35k funding grant for bush regeneration works at Waratah Park and many volunteers have given their time working on bush maintenance and regeneration there. The other buildings and built structures within the property are in variable condition but are not considered significant to this State listing.

The Ranger Headquarters building is in sound physical condition although somewhat run-down. The Skippy set within the Ranger Headquarters underwent conservation works by ICS in 2014. The bushland is vulnerable to the effects of weeds and feral animals but has been under the care of Duffys Forest Residents Association and their volunteers from Sydney and other areas of NSW. The other buildings and built structures within the property are in variable condition but are not considered significant to the State listing.

=== Modifications and dates ===
c. 1967 Permission was granted by the NSW Government to occupy 10 hectares (24 acres) of Crown land adjoining the Ku-ring-gai Chase National Park for use as a film set for the TV series, "Skippy the Bush Kangaroo". A building was constructed in the park to function as Ranger Headquarters and residence in the series. From 1970 after filming was complete, Waratah Park was open to the public as a tourism venue and conservation area where plants and wildlife were protected. Various structures were built to help with the operations of the site at this time including a gatehouse, BBQ area, children's play area, animal enclosures and two mobile homes. The helipad was dug out and turned into a lagoon. These later built additions to the park are not significant and some may be considered intrusive. Since 2006 Waratah Park has been closed to the public.

== Heritage listing ==
As at 28 November 2014, Waratah Park is of State historical significance as the site where the iconic television series "Skippy the Bush Kangaroo" was set and filmed 1967–1969. The adventures of a boy and a kangaroo in the Australian bush held great appeal for both Australian and overseas viewers, and Skippy achieved outstanding international sales to over 100 countries. Running to 91 episodes, plus a feature film, the TV series may be considered one of Australia's most successful exports. Waratah Park retains familiar remnants from the TV set including largely intact bush-land, the Ranger's Headquarters building with interior set and remnant "Skippy" merchandise. Waratah Park is likely to have social significance at a State level for both domestic and international TV viewers who enjoyed watching the "Skippy" series and became attached to this image of the Australian bush-land, and for its role as a tourist venue offering an "Australian bush experience" and an opportunity to see the set of "Skippy". Waratah Park is also likely to be of State significance for its rarity as a bush-land site which was shown all over the world and raised international awareness of the Australian landscape. The Rangers Headquarters building is rare for being a surviving TV set from the 1960s with recognisable and intact interior sets.

Waratah Park was listed on the New South Wales State Heritage Register on 27 February 2015 having satisfied the following criteria.

The place is important in demonstrating the course, or pattern, of cultural or natural history in New South Wales.

Waratah Park is of state historical significance as the site where the iconic TV series "Skippy the Bush Kangaroo" was set and filmed between 1967 and 1969. The adventures of a boy and a kangaroo in the Australian bush held great appeal for both Australian and overseas viewers, and Skippy achieved outstanding international sales to over 100 countries. Running to 91 episodes, plus a feature film, the TV series may be considered one of Australia's most successful exports. Waratah Park retains important remnants from the TV set including largely intact bush-land, the Ranger's Headquarters building with interior TV set and remnant "Skippy" merchandise.

The place has a strong or special association with a person, or group of persons, of importance of cultural or natural history of New South Wales's history.

Waratah Park is of state significance for its strong association with the iconic Australian TV series and actors from "Skippy the Bush Kangaroo", which was filmed there between 1968 and 1970. The set, and therefore the place, became familiar to many Australians in NSW and others throughout the world who fondly recall the TV series.

The place has a strong or special association with a particular community or cultural group in New South Wales for social, cultural or spiritual reasons.

Waratah Park has social significance at a state level to both domestic and international TV viewers who enjoyed watching the "Skippy" series and became attached to this image of the Australian landscape through that medium. Waratah Park also has social significance for the esteem in which it was held by local and international guests who visited the park during its time as a tourist venue offering an "Australian bush experience" and an opportunity to see the set of "Skippy".

The place possesses uncommon, rare or endangered aspects of the cultural or natural history of New South Wales.

Waratah Park is of state significance for its rarity as a bush-land site used as the film set of an iconic Australian TV series, which was shown all over the world and raised the world's awareness of the Australian landscape. The Rangers Headquarters building is rare for being a surviving TV set from the 1960s with highly recognisable and intact interior sets.
