= Ken James (actor) =

Australian actor

- Born: 16 November 1948 (age 78); Sydney, New South Wales, Australia
- Occupations: Actor, celebrity chef
- Years active: 1960–2018
- Known for: Skippy the Bush Kangaroo (TV series) as Mark Hammond; The Box (TV series) as Tony Wild; Skyways (TV series) as Simon Young; Glenview High (TV series) as Tom Walker; Sons and Daughters as Mike O'Brien (TV series); Good Morning Australia (TV series) as Celebrity chef
- Height: 178 cm (5 ft 10 in)
- Partner: Rosemarie Stuhlener
- Website: www.kenjames.com.au

Ken James (born 16 November 1948) is an Australian former actor and celebrity chef. He is most widely known for his role in children's TV show Skippy the Bush Kangaroo as Mark Hammond from which he became known to both local and international audiences Following Skippy, James continued to work in film, television and theatre for another 36 years. In December 2009, James was diagnosed with stage three non-Hodgkin lymphoma, which escalated to stage four by 2011. James started chemotherapy, and as of November 2020 the cancer is in remission. James was also actively involved in the Victorian Police Force as an unsworn member from 1993 to 2013.

== Early life and education ==
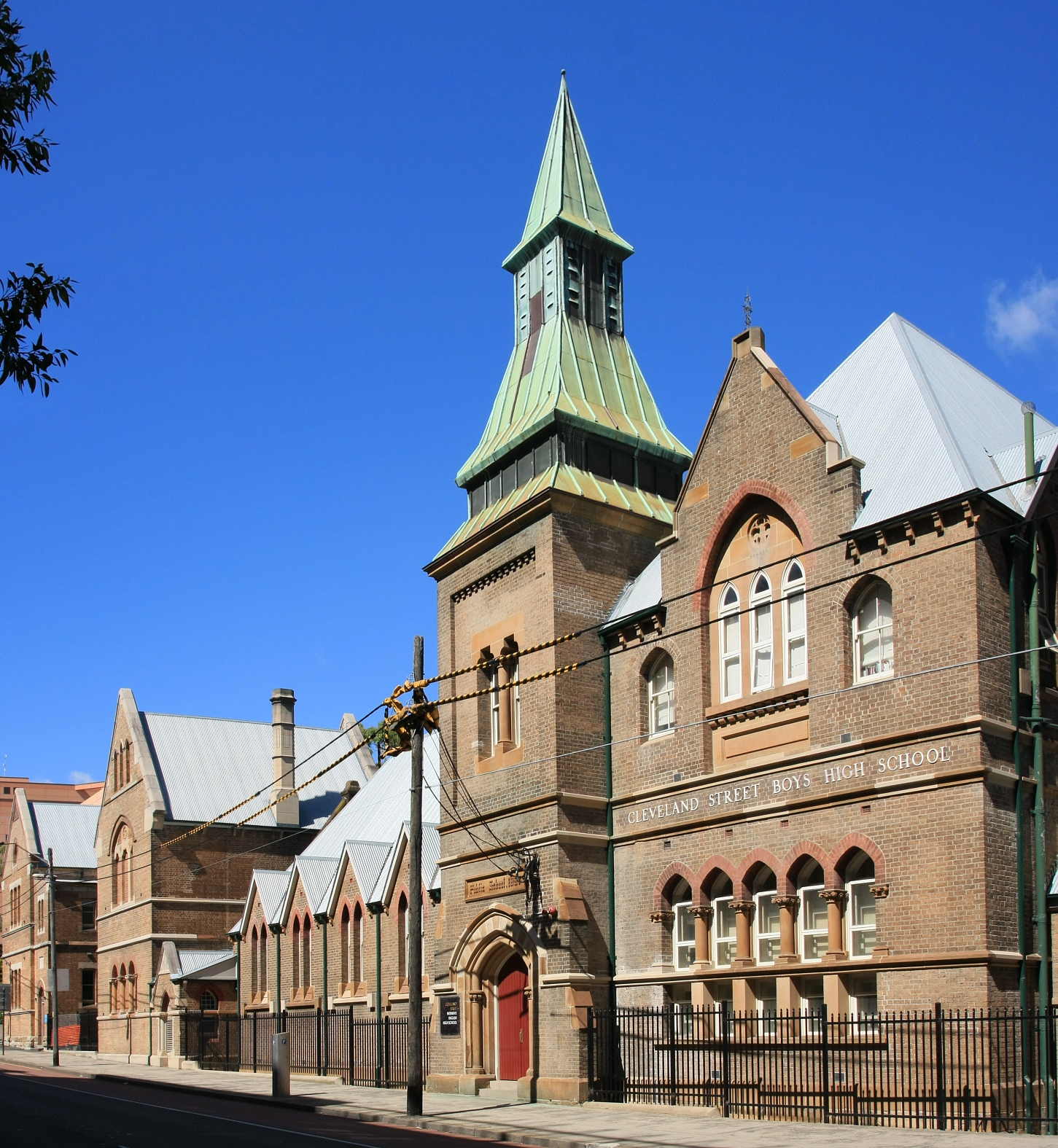
Front of Cleveland Street Boys High School, where Ken James graduated from high school - December 2009

James was born in Sydney on 16 November 1948 and finished his schooling at Cleveland Street Boys High School. During his time at school, James became particularly interested in school plays, which acted as an impetus to join the acting industry. At the age of 12, a neighbour showed him an advertisement in a newspaper calling for young child actors/models to join the agency. The same year, in 1960, James appeared in the children's drama The Adventurers produced for ATN-7 Sydney as his first acting role.

== Career ==
James has acted in multiple film roles, TV series, musicals and theatrical productions, as well as appearing on various game and news shows. After Skippy ended in 1970, James was still on a contract with Fauna Productions for another 12 months, and was cast to play Kip Young in Barrier Reef in 1971. James had his 21st birthday during the production of the TV show.

Once Barrier Reef ended after a single season, James had recurring roles as television actor Tony Wild in The Box (1974–1977), Tom Walker in Glenview High (1977–1978), air traffic controller Simon Young in Skyways (1979–1980), and Mike O'Brien in Sons and Daughters (1984–1985).

He has also appeared in smaller roles in series Matlock Police, Pugwall, Prisoner, and made guest appearances in many other TV shows.

James is passionate about cooking and worked on Good Morning Australia with Bert Newton for over 10 years as a celebrity chef. He was also involved in the marketing campaign of the cooking aid Ecopot.

James worked as a drama tutor at the Australian Television Academy for 10 years, and also as a Master of Ceremonies for the Royal Children's Hospital, weddings and private functions at the suggestion of a friend who listed an ad in the Yellow Pages. James didn't receive much work as an MC, although he was the Master of Ceremonies for John Knowles' wedding.

James worked as an adjudicator at the Ararat One Act Play Festival in August 2013, awarding first prize to Erica Smith and Jeanette and Meg Dunn, who performed Snuffuff's Emporium of Odds, Sods and Collectibles at Nuworks Theatre.

In August 2013, James was involved in the filming of a comedic advertisement for Sport Rider Pride Mobility Scooter on the original grounds of the Skippy set, Sydney's Waratah Park. The advertisement involved James hurting his back while repairing a motor bike in front of the Ranger's headquarters. Geoff Harvey then rides into the scene on a Pride Mobility Scooter and convinces James to try riding it. James' on-screen grandson tells James and Harvey that 'Jerry' is at the gate and needs help, before the two drive off scene on mobility scooters.

James acted in the play Ladies Night in 2012 alongside Steven Tandy and Alli Pope (produced by Jally Entertainment). The Australian tour was six months long, and began with a fundraiser in Gympie, Queensland for the charity Little Haven. After the initial fundraiser, the cast went on to perform in 52 other locations.

After the conclusion of the Ladies Night tour, James directed Calendar Girls for Jally Entertainment in January and February 2013.

== Skippy the Bush Kangaroo ==
At the age of 16, four years after joining the acting industry, James was cast as Mark Hammond in the pilot episode of the classic Australian TV show Skippy. The series had not been confirmed at the time and James was also offered a scholarship to the National Institute of Dramatic Art (NIDA), which he accepted. James left NIDA after four days as the Skippy series had been confirmed. He played Mark Hammond over the next three and a half years, starring in 91 episodes. Skippy was screened in 128 countries and is still screened around the world today. James' co-star Garry Pankhurst was cast as Sonny in Skippy at the age of 10 and left the acting industry after the show finished 3 years later, as he was overwhelmed by the adulation received from being a child actor. Despite this, James still praises Pankhurst, saying "The camera loved him, and he was very photogenic. He also had a photographic memory; he could look at a page of dialogue and get it down like "bang". He was extremely natural."

James and other cast members of Skippy were not paid residuals from the TV show. Because of this, Tony Bonner had a falling out with the producers and moved to England to continue working in the acting industry. James has also expressed his own distress at lack of ongoing residuals from Skippy.

That a show as mild and escapist as Skippy debuted in 1968, a year in which the world was in turmoil (it was, for instance, the year in which both Robert F Kennedy and Martin Luther King were assassinated, might seem unusual. James suggests this is because "We [Australia] weren’t that sophisticated, quite frankly, when you look at the world stage."

== The Box and Tony Wild ==
James' role in The Box saw him prominent on screen in the high-rating soap for three years. Tony Wild was a significant presence in the show and featured heavily in major storylines, albeit usually with a comedic element. The opening credits for The Box showed James, as Wild playing Detective Blake, leaping from a police vehicle and shooting at an unseen target. This cuts to a television set exploding.

Tony Wild played the character of Blake in the fictitious police drama Manhunt, a parody of the Crawford Productions police dramas for which the company was best known at this time. Wild is good-natured and hard working but egotistical and obsessed both with his career generally and his role in Manhunt specifically. When he moves into Fanny Adams' apartment as co-tenant and sometime lover, he installs a floor-to-ceiling poster of himself on the wall.

Wild typically eschews long-term relationships, though he does periodically liaise with Vicki Stafford (Judy Nunn)) and is perturbed when Sharon Lewis ((Noni Hazelhurst) turns him down for a second date on the basis that she does not want to be tied down. He is the long-term object of the affection of teenager Tina Harris (Tracey Mann) and the two claim to have a brother-sister friendship; Harris lives alone in a flat above Wild's in a converted terrace house.

As well as appearing in Manhunt, Wild was for a brief period host of Channel 12's cornerstone variety show Big Night Out while its usual host, Gary Burke (Peter Regan) was pursuing theatrical ambitions in Sydney.

== Personal life ==
James has two children from his first marriage of 24 years. In 2001, James met Rosemarie Stuhlener, a retired Telstra manager who lives in Geelong, and the two were engaged in 2003 and married in 2011. James and Shuttler do not live with each other and do not intend to, making them a living apart together couple.

James has made contributions to multiple charities including Life Education, Variety, and Bali's Jodie O’Shea Orphanage.

James was diagnosed with stage 3 non-Hodgkin lymphoma in 2009 after he noticed a lump on his neck while shaving. This cancer then escalated to stage 4 and spread to his bones in 2011, requiring radiotherapy and chemotherapy in order to be treated. James began a chemotherapy course in April 2011 and is now cancer-free, after successfully completing chemotherapy. His diagnosis followed the cancer death of former Skippy cast member Ed Devereaux (oesophagus) in December 2003, and the diagnoses of other Skippy cast members Liza Goddard (breast) and Tony Bonner (prostate) in 1997 and 2004 respectively.

=== Involvement in the Victorian Police Force ===
James was involved in the Victorian Police Force as an unsworn police officer for over 20 years, from 1993 to 2013. He originally assisted the Victorian Police Force in Detective Training School through role-playing in crime re-enactments. James played a bank manager who was robbed, as well as a witness to a sexual assault. James believes in 'the thin blue line', and after asking, was later given permission by the Chief Commissioner of the Victorian Police Force at the time, Neil Comrie, to give a 1-hour pro bono lecture on police and detective communication skills with the public and motivation, which he delivered from 1993 to 2013. James has received multiple certificates of appreciation from the Victorian Police Force in regard to his lectures on communication and motivation.

== Acting credits ==
=== Television ===
Year	Title	Role	Notes	Ref
1960	The Adventurers		TV series	
1968–1970	Skippy	Mark Hammond	TV series, recurring role	
1970	Dynasty	Ted Morris	TV series, season 1, episode 4	
1971	The Group	Mark Sebel	TV series	
1971	Barrier Reef	Kip Young	TV series, recurring role	
1972	Division 4	Ted Johnson / Paul Cooper / Ben Davis	TV series, 3 episodes: "To Bribe or Twist", "Take Over", "Inside Information"	
1972; 1973	Matlock Police	Peter Ward / David	TV series, 3 episodes: "Bury Them Together", "Cheeky Charlie", "Big C Blues"	
1974–1977	The Box	Tony Wild	TV series, recurring role	
1977–1979	Glenview High	Tom Walker	TV series, recurring role	
1978	Catspaw	Nuggett	TV series	
1978	Cop Shop	Larry Walker	TV series, season 1, episode 6	
1979–1980	Skyways	Simon Young	TV series, recurring role	
1981	Bellamy	Rego	TV series, 1 episode	
1983	Prisoner	Barry Simmons	TV series	
1984–1985	Sons and Daughters	Mike O'Brien	TV series, recurring role	
1989–1991	Pugwall	Frank 'Herohead' Wall	TV series	
1993	Time Trax	Sgt. Davis	TV series	
1994; 2000	Blue Heelers	Mathew Balfour / Keith Herbert	TV series, season 1, episode 38 & season 7, episode 37	

=== Film ===
Year	Title	Role	Notes	Ref
1966	Illegal Abortion			
1966	They're a Weird Mob	Bellboy at King's Cross Hotel (uncredited)	Feature film	
1969	The Intruders	Mark Hammond	Skippy the Bush Kangaroo spin-off feature film	
1972	A Fan's Notes	Joey, the bartender	Feature film	
1975	The Box	Tony Wild	Feature film	
1981	Silence of the North	The Salesman	Feature film	
1983	Moving Targets	Jimmy		
1984	Change of Heart	Bob		

=== Self appearances ===
Year	Title	Role	Notes	Ref
1972	Split Second	Host	Game show	
1972	Switched On Set	Presenter	Magazine style show	
1977	The Celebrity Game	Self	TV series	
1993	The Late Show	Guest (The D-Generation reunion)	TV series	
1993	Good Morning Australia	Budget Chef	TV series	
2003	Micallef Tonight	Guest	TV series	
2003	Which Way Did They Go, Skip?	Self	Video documentary short	
2009	Skippy: Australia's First Superstar	Self / Mark Hammond	TV movie documentary	
2015	Millionaire Hot Seat	Contestant	TV series	
2018	The Friday Show	Panellist, Actor	TV series	

=== As actor ===
Year	Title	Role	Location / Co.
1973	The Love Game	Draycott Harris	Comedy Theatre, Melbourne with J. C. Williamson’s
1981	Jack and the Beanstalk	Jack	Northland Shopping Centre Theatre, Melbourne with Terry Gill Productions
1985	The Rocky Horror Show	Brad	Australian tour – Tasmania, Australian Capital Territory, Victoria, New South Wales with Konsmithbar
1990	Anything Goes	Lord Evelyn	Aotea Centre, Auckland, New Zealand
1991; 1993	The Adman	Eric Stirling	Malthouse Theatre, Melbourne, Monash University, Melbourne, Ford Theatre, Geelong, Ensemble Theatre, Sydney with Playbox Theatre Company
1993	I'm Not Rappaport	Danforth	Playhouse, Melbourne with MTC
1994	Pushin' Up Daisies		Napier Street Theatre, Melbourne with Southern Lights
2001	Invasion from a Planet with No Special Effects		Studio 1B, Sydney with Ferknerkle Productions
2004	Previously On		Newtown Theatre, Sydney with Ferknerkle Productions for Short+Sweet
2005	Ten Part Invention – Five Bells Suite	Musician: Saxophonist	Sydney Opera House
2012	Ladies Night		Australian tour with Jally Entertainment (based on The Full Monty)
	Run for your Wife		Harvest Theatre Co.
	Luv		Stage Door Theatre Restaurant
	Not on your Telly		The Mansion Theatre Restaurant
	The Naked Vicar Show		RS Productions
	Help		Revue with Reg Livermore

=== As director ===
Year	Title	Role	Location / Co.
2013	Calendar Girls	Director	Australian tour with Jally Entertainment
