= Don't Blame Me (TV series) =

- Also known as: Don't Blame the Koalas
- Genre: Children's; Comedy
- Written by: Geoff Newton; Kym Goldsworthy; Simon Hopkinson; John Armstrong; John Thomson
- Directed by: Kevin Dobson; Marcus Cole; Ray Quint; Ralph Strasser
- Starring: Liam Hess; Hollie Chapman; Basia A'Hern; Shaun Loseby; Henry Nixon; Fiona Terry; Anh Do
- Country of origin: Australia
- Original language: English
- No. of seasons: 1
- No. of episodes: 26

Production
- Executive producers: Kris Noble; Nick Wilson; Noel Price
- Producers: Noel Price; Dennis Kiely
- Production locations: Waratah Park, Australia
- Running time: 24 minutes
- Production company: Southern Star Group

Original release
- Network: Nine Network
- Release: 14 October 2002 – 30 March 2003

Don't Blame Me (also known as Don't Blame the Koalas in the United Kingdom) is an Australian children's television program produced by Southern Star Group that premiered on October 14, 2002 and ended on March 30, 2003 originally on the Nine Network and is currently shown on ABC3 with a total of 26 episodes. It was nominated for only three awards, two of those at the 2003 Australian Film Institute Awards with Liam Hess' Young Actor Award being the only win.

== Premise ==
Don't Blame the Koalas follows Gabrielle, Greg and Jemma King, an upper-crust family from London who, after learning they are bankrupt, travel to Sydney to live with their Australian relatives, Chris, Kate and Mark, with the belief they have inherited a large cattle ranch, only to discover upon arriving that what they really inherited was a largely unprofitable, slightly rundown wildlife park. The show is set in Wallaby Park, an Australian wildlife park in the Ku-ring-gai National Park on the suburbs of Sydney. Most of the comedy in the series is slightly surreal in a Round the Twist/Driven Crazy-style way. Special effects and sounds are used to convey the characters' actions mixed in with slightly sped up footage when walking. Many of the characters frequently break the fourth wall. Having to do whatever means to keep the wildlife park up to building code standards for visitors, Vinnie has a dark past that he must call upon his old friends still involved in the Golden Triangle to save the day.

== Cast ==
=== Main ===
- Liam Hess as Gregory King
- Hollie Chapman as Jemma King
- Basia A'Hern as Kate King
- Shaun Loseby as Mark King
- Henry Nixon as Chris King
- Fiona Terry as Gabrielle King, Gregory and Jemma's mother
- Anh Do as Vinnie, a Vietnamese-Australian animal handler

=== Recurring ===
- Wendy Playfair as Mrs. Smythe
- Rhys Wakefield as Brad
- Sophie Luck
- Celia Ireland as Schoolteacher
- Roy Billing as Principal
- Brittany Byrnes as Actress #3
- Carole Skinner as Weird Wanda
- Laurie Foell as Miss Crowley

== Episodes ==
Series overview

Series	Episodes	Originally released	
Series	Episodes	First released	Last released
1	26	14 October 2002	30 March 2003

=== Season 1 (2002) ===
No. overall	No. in season	Title	Directed by	Written by	Original release date	Prod. code
1	1	"Fate Steps In"	Kevin Dobson	Noel Price	14 October 2002	101
Chris, Kate and Mark King run Wallaby Park, a small wildlife park near Sydney when they learn that their lives and property are about to be taken over by their long-lost relatives from London, Gabrielle, Jemma and Greg, after going bankrupt.
2	2	"All Kings Together"	Kevin Dobson	Noel Price	15 October 2002	102
When Gabrielle, Jemma and Greg King finally arrive in Australia, they discover that 'Wallaby Park' is far from being the huge cattle ranch they were hoping to sell for a quick profit.
3	3	"Gemma Makes Her Mark"	Kevin Dobson	Noel Price	16 October 2002	103
School's in for Jemma and Greg and it's chaos and culture shock all around.
4	4	"Greg Scores a Goal"	Kevin Dobson	Kym Goldsworthy	17 October 2002	104
Jemma attempts to teach Kate how to be a real girl and Greg's head produces unexpected results for the school soccer team.
5	5	"The Old Devil Music"	Kevin Dobson	Simon Hopkinson	21 October 2002	105
When Greg has to learn the euphonium for the school band, his music has a miraculous effect on the park's Tasmanian Devils.
6	6	"A Snake in the Class"	Kevin Dobson	Geoff Newton	22 October 2002	106
While Kate shepherds Greg through his first encounter with an Australian beach, Jemma turns the tables on Mark with the help of a python.
7	7	"The Monster of Wallaby Park"	Ralph Strasser	John Armstrong	17 November 2002	107
When Kate, Greg and Mark create a mystery creature to help promote Wallaby Park's image, they don't reckon on Jemma becoming an overnight media star.
8	8	"Animal Art"	Ralph Strasser	Kym Goldsworthy	24 October 2002	108
Jemma is furious when she discovers that Mark cheats in art classes by getting the emus to help him with his paintings.
9	9	"Guru Mark"	Ralph Strasser	John Armstrong	28 October 2002	109
Kate's election as class captain produces a very swollen head while Jemma aims to get back at Mark with the best practical joke of all-time.
10	10	"Things That Go Bump"	Ralph Strasser	Simon Hopkinson	29 October 2002	110
Jemma goes vegetarian and stages a protest against Wallaby Park's treatment of animals while Greg finds a new friend in the insect world.
11	11	"Happy Families"	Ray Quint	Geoff Newton and Kym Goldsworthy	30 October 2002	111
A weekend camping trip puts family harmony to the test and Gabrielle learns that life in a cage is strictly for the birds.
12	12	"Suspicious Minds"	Ray Quint	John Armstrong	22 December 2002	112
Jemma's attitude towards animals is upended by the arrival of a cat which refuses to stay and an emu that refuses to go.
13	13	"The Dingo Made Me Do It"	Ray Quint	John Thomson	4 November 2002	113
Mark and Jemma make an unlikely team for the school cross country race while Greg panics about leaving open the gate to the dingo enclosure.
14	14	"Best Foot Forward"	Ray Quint	Kym Goldsworthy	5 November 2002	114
Kate and Greg stumble across mysterious clues suggesting evil work is afoot and Mark discovers that his future lies on a bike in Europe.
15	15	"The Burger Master"	Marcus Cole	Kym Goldworthy	6 November 2002	115
When a world record for hamburger eating is up for grabs, Mark wonders if he's up to the challenge.
16	16	"All for a Good Cause"	Marcus Cole	John Armstrong	12 November 2002	116
It's time for the school fete and the Kings set out to win the prize for the most successful stall.
17	17	"Billy Cart Madness"	Marcus Cole	John Thomson	26 January 2003	117
While Kate and Jemma come up with the ideal venture to make money, Mark and Greg go all out to win the annual Billy Cart derby.
18	18	"Liar Liar"	Marcus Cole	Chris Kunz	14 November 2002	118
Jemma digs herself into a very deep hole when she tells the entire school that she's best friends with a famous English 'rap' artist.
19	19	"A Star Is Born"	Ralph Strasser	John Armstrong	18 November 2002	119
When Karate Girl, a big U.S. television show, films an episode at Wallaby Park, the Kings discover that show business isn't all it's cracked up to be.
20	20	"Dropped In It"	Ralph Strasser	Nick Wilson	18 November 2002	120
Greg applies some very lateral thinking when confronted by Wallaby Park's animal manure problem.
21	21	"Kate's Greatest Fan"	Marcus Cole	Kym Goldsworthy	20 November 2002	121
When Kate proves she's a top marbles player, she wins the admiration of a fan who is both unexpected and unwanted.
22	22	"Murder, Mystery, Mayhem"	Ralph Strasser	Geoff Newton	26 November 2002	122
Mark adopts an unusual training routine to improve his basketball skills while Jemma shows Kate the secrets of movie making.
23	23	"Hoop Dreams"	Marcus Cole	John Benson	9 March 2002	123
Jemma is horrified when a school friend from England arrives and is on the verge of discovering that her life in Australia is not as glamorous as she pretended while Chris takes over coaching duty for Kate's netball team.
24	24	"Jinxed"	Marcus Cole	Chris Kunz	28 November 2002	124
Mark believes that Jemma has brought him bad luck when she accidentally breaks his favorite bat.
25	25	"Who's Who"	Marcus Cole	John Thomson	4 December 2002	125
When Vinnie starts acting strangely, Greg and Kate suspect he could be involved in a bird smuggling operation.
26	26	"Justice for All"	Ralph Strasser	Simon Hopkinson	5 December 2002	126
A surprise offer is made to buy Wallaby Park and the King family must decide whether or not to accept it. Note: This is the end of the series.

== Development and production ==
=== Filming ===
Don't Blame the Koalas was filmed in the Australian wildlife reserve in Waratah Park NSW, previously made famous as the home of Skippy the Bush Kangaroo. Like Malcolm in the Middle, hallmarks of the series' filming and structure, many of which heavily influenced later programs such as Mortified and In Your Dreams (both of those series also feature at least one character frequently breaking the fourth wall), included the following:

- A 1 1/2-second whip pan as a transition from one scene to another.
- Frequent pieces to camera delivered by the King family.

== Crew ==
- Executive producers: Kris Noble, Noel Price, Nick Wilson
- Producers: Noel Price, Dennis Kiely
- Writers: Kym Goldsworthy, John Armstrong, John Thomson, Simon Hopkinson, Geoff Newton, Noel Price, Chris Kunz, Nick Wilson, John Benson
- Directors: Marcus Cole, Ralph Strasser, Kevin James Dobson, Ray Quint
- Script editor: Kym Goldsworthy

== Awards and Nominations ==
Year	Award	Category	Recipient	Result
2003	Australian Film Institute Awards	Young Actor Award	Liam Hess	Won
2003	Australian Film Institute Awards	Best Children's Television Drama	Noel Price and Dennis Kiely	Nominee
2003	BAFTA Children's Award	Best International	Noel Price and Dennis Kiely	Nominee
