= Ross Napier =

Ross Napier (April 21, 1929 – November 2, 2004) was one of Australia's leading radio and TV writers from the 1950s to 1990s, as well as an accomplished novelist. Born in Sydney in 1929, he began writing short stories for magazines while still in high school, selling his first script at 17. Shortly after, he became a staff writer for Grace Gibson Radio Productions, and during the 1950s and 1960s his radio serials were broadcast Australia-wide and internationally. This firmly established Napier as one of Australia's leading drama writers. Whilst at Gibson's he met Ann Fuller, who he married in 1953.

== Career ==
Napier spent much of his career in television, notably as script editor of the classic Australian series Skippy the Bush Kangaroo, for which he wrote the majority of episodes. Skippy was sold to 128 countries, dubbed into 25 languages and watched by a global audience of over 300 million viewers. Napier was also script editor and regular writer on the ground-breaking Number 96, and head writer/script editor of The Restless Years, another TV ratings winner, as well as Chopper Squad.

In 1982, he came up with a new format for radio called The Castlereagh Line. Originally contracted for 65 episodes, it ran for 910 and was aired by more stations than any Australian serial ever. At a time when radio drama had long been put out to pasture, 2WS saw its potential. The program was so popular that factories downed tools to enable the staff to listen to it. According to an article in The Sydney Morning Herald in 1984, "Devotees are continually ringing the station to find out what will happen in the next three weeks as they have to know, or they can't go on holiday". The radio serial has been re-broadcast nationally many times over and continues to run to this day.

Napier loved the Castlereagh project. He and wife Ann researched all the locations where the story took place, driving around Tamworth and Glen Innes and visiting all the old coaching stations. During the course of the initial series from 1982 to 1986, Napier wrote the first three Castlereagh novels: The Castlereagh Line, The Castlereagh Way and The Colours of Castlereagh. The books were sold in all major and most independent bookstores nationally, with Line and Way going into reprint. Over the next few years came four more Castlereagh novels: The Castlereagh Heritage, The Castlereagh Rose, The Castlereagh Crown and The Castlereagh Cross.

The never-before-published grand finale, The Castlereagh Requiem, was drafted before Napier died in 2004. The manuscript is currently being edited by his daughter, Linzi Napier, who, with Jacqui Law-Smith, formed Castlereagh Productions with plans to re-release the novels and turn the successful radio serial into a television series.

== Selected writings ==
- Alias the Baron (1950) – radio
- Amazing Mr Malone (1952) – radio
- Famous Fortunes (1952) – radio
- You Can't Win (1953) – radio
- Address Unknown (1954) – radio
- Portia Faces Life (1950s–70) – radio
- You Can't Win (1953) – radio
- Address Unknown (1954) – radio
- Lust for Life (1961) – radio
- I Know My Love (1962) – radio
- Sara Dane (1962) – radio
- Desiree (1963) – radio
- Emergency Line (1964) – radio
- Pray for a Brave Heart (1964) – radio
- The Tilsit Inheritance (1965) – radio
- Emergency Line (1965) – radio
- The Shame of Sefton Ridge (1966) – radio
- The Sinners of Sonoma (1967) – radio
- Borrasca (1968) – radio
- Kinkhead (1968) – radio
- Skippy the Bush Kangaroo – TV series – writer and script editor
- The Intruders (1969) – film – original story
- Thirty Days Hath September (1969) – radio
- Goodbye Gwynnevere (1970) – radio
- I Killed Grace Random (1970) – radio
- So Help Me God (1970) – radio
- I, Christopher Macaulay (1971) – radio
- My Father's House (1972) – radio
- Without Shame (1972) – radio
- Strip Jack Naked (1973) – radio
- Heir Apparent (1974) – radio
- Way of the Cat (1974) – radio
- Exciting Stories From Australia's History (1975) – radio
- Forever's a Long Time (1977) – radio
- The Castlereagh Line (1982) – radio
- The Castlereagh Line (1984) – novel
- The Castlereagh Way (1985) – novel
- The Castlereagh Rose (1985) – novel
- The Colours of Castlereagh (1987) – novel
- The Castlereagh Heritage (1988) – novel
- The Castlereagh Cross (1992) – novel
- The Castlereagh Requiem (Yet to be Published) – novel

== Additional film, TV and scriptwriting credits ==
- They Were Big, They Were Blue, They Were Beautiful: Ross Napier, Sydney : Australian Television Network, 1959 film/TV
- Boney and the Albatross Ross Napier, Australia: Fauna Productions, 1973 film/TV
- Sunday Afternoon with Peter Ross Peter Ross (interviewer), Crows Nest: ABC Books, 1990 selected work interview
- Follow My Leader: Ross Napier, Australia: Fauna Productions, 1970 film/TV
- Follow My Leader: Ross Napier, 1972 screenplay — Appears in: In Focus: Scripts from Commercial Television's Second Decade 1972; (p. 62-82)
- The Intruders: Ross Napier, Lee Robinson, Australia: Woomera Productions, 1969 film/TV children's adventure
- Number 96: (TV Series) (1975-1977) Writers Ross Napier, David Sale, Peter Pascoe. Sydney: Reg Grundy Enterprises
- Bailey's Bird: John McCallum, Ross Napier, Ted Roberts, Australia: Woomera Productions Seven Network, 1979 series - publisher film/TV adventure
- The Restless Years: Ian Coughlan, Hugh Stuckey, Coral Drouyn, David Phillips, Ross Napier, Maureen Ann Moran, Reg Watson, Sydney: Reg Grundy Enterprises, 1977 series - publisher film/TV
- Barrier Reef: Joy Cavill, Lee Robinson, Brian Faull, John McCallum, Ted Roberts, Ross Napier, Ron McLean, Michael Wright, Peter Maxwell, Norfolk Island: Fauna Productions Network Ten, 1971-1972 series - publisher film/TV
- Chopper Squad: Ron McLean, Tony Morphett, Robert Caswell, Don Battye, Denise Morgan, Everett de Roche, Peter Smalley, Colin Eggleston, Derek Strahan, Luis Bayonas, James Wulf Simmonds, Simon Wincer, Ross Napier, John Bramley, Bruce Wishart, Tom Mclennan, Colin James, Keith Hetherington, Sydney: Reg Grundy Enterprises, 1978 series - publisher film/TV crime adventure
- Skippy Lee: Robinson, Dennis Hill, Ross Napier, Ted Roberts, Joy Cavill, Lee Robinson, Denys Burrows, Ed Devereaux, Moya Wood, Carol Odell, Joan Levy, Rae Glasser, Warren Glasser, James Workman, Tony Booth, J. Benn Darrow, Dennis Hill, Creswick Jenkinson, Michael Wright, Maureen Walsh, Scotty Denholm, Suzanne Baker, Peter Finnane, Peter Kay, Kay Keavney, John McCallum, Will Pryor, Ron Taylor, Margaret Trist, John Warwick, Rene Devereaux, Alex McDonald, Phyllis McLean, Ron McLean, Richard Raper, Stephen Rhodes, Martyn Sanderson, Valerie Taylor, Albie Thoms, Alan Veitch, Brian Wright, Stewart A. Fist, Bill Lambert, Harry Woollerton, Australia: Nine Network Fauna Productions, 1968-1970series - publisher film/TV
- Murder: Pie J. L. Ranken (editor), Jane Clunies Ross (editor), Sydney: Angus and Robertson, 1936 novel crime mystery Mozzie: Collaborative Poem "it is the moon that makes everything so still", Sue Clennell, Cheryl Howard, Jan Price, Ross Jackson, Jan Napier, Bill Henderson, Sue Cook, Avril Bradley, Rhonda Poholke, John Egan, Graeme Hetherington, Colleen Keating, Decima Wraxall, Ros Armstrong, Lyn Williams, Kate Tongs, Ron Heard, Kathryn Hamann, David Adès, Kevin Gillam, Mary Jones, Nola Frawley, Ben Wiegerink, Clio Curtis, 2014 poetry — The Mozzie, October vol. 22 no. 9 2014; (p. [2])
- Mistresses: Bound with Gold Richmond: Mills and Boon, 2010 anthology novel romance Centrefold Valerie Parv, London: Mills and Boon, 1988 novel romance Elizabeth Riddell Peter Ross (interviewer), 1990 interview — Appears in: Sunday Afternoon with Peter Ross 1990; (p. 111-126) Airtight Ian Barry, Australia: UPN, 1999 film/TV science fiction
- Nicholas Quinn–Anonymous: Anthony Scott Veitch, United Kingdom (UK): British Broadcasting Corporation (BBC), 1966 series - publisher radio play thriller
- Flirting: John Duigan, Australia: Kennedy Miller Entertainment, 1991 film/TV (taught in 3 units)
- Robbery Under Arms: Alexander Baron, W. P. Lipscomb, Richard Mason, London: Rank Organisation, 1957 film/TV
- Boney Australia: Fauna Productions Seven Network, 1972-1973 series - publisher film/TV crime
