= Shannon's Mob =

Australian television series

- Genre: Espionage
- Directed by: Ron Way; Brian Bell; Howard Rubie; Ian Bennett
- Starring: Robin Ramsay; Frank Gallacher
- Composer: Eric Jupp
- Country of origin: Australia
- Original language: English
- No. of seasons: 1
- No. of episodes: 13

Production
- Executive producer: Bob Austin
- Producers: Joy Cavill; Lee Robinson
- Production location: Sydney
- Camera setup: John Williams
- Running time: 60 mins
- Production company: Fauna Productions

Original release
- Network: Nine Network
- Release: 27 October 1975 – 4 February 1976

Shannon's Mob is an Australian TV series about an Australian intelligence agency. It was the last TV series from Fauna Productions, who were responsible for Skippy the Bush Kangaroo among others.

== Synopsis ==
FIASCO (The Federal Intelligence and Security Control Organisation) is a top-secret department whose existence was known only to a few and was answerable only to the Prime Minister. Under the control of one time Scotland Yard cop Dave Shannon, the main characters were agents Andrew Blake (Robin Ramsay) and Michael Jamieson (Frank Gallacher) who often worked undercover.

== Cast ==
=== Main ===
- Robin Ramsay as Andrew Blake
- Frank Gallacher as Michael Jamieson

=== Guests ===
- Alastair Duncan
- Alwyn Kurts as Alan Merritt (1 episode)
- Angela Punch McGregor as Prostitute (1 episode)
- Ben Gabriel as Aklov (1 episode)
- Cecily Polson as Edith Thomas (1 episode)
- Chantal Contouri as Tara (1 episode)
- Chris Haywood as Richard Pollard (1 episode)
- Diana Perryman as Mrs Pellini
- Don Crosby
- Elke Neidhardt
- Gerard Maguire as Fraser (1 episode)
- Gillian Jones as Carol (1 episode)
- Joanne Samuel as Felicity Maitland (1 episode)
- John Clayton as Joe (1 episode)
- John Fegan as Corby (1 episode)
- Judy Lynne as Sophie Hochman (1 episode)
- Julieanne Newbould as Libby (1 episode)
- Kevin Manser a Harry Davis (1 episode)
- Lorrae Desmond as Cassandra
- Max Cullen as Vossif (1 episode)
- Max Phipps as Patrick Ryan (1 episode)
- Max Osbiston as Samuels (1 episode)
- Michael Aitkens (1 episode)
- Norman Kaye as Henry Vaughan (1 episode)
- Pat Bishop as Miss Warwick (1 episode)
- Rowena Wallace as Estelle (1 episode)
- Vincent Ball as Ashby (1 episode)

== Production ==
Production of the series took place from October 1973 to May 1974, mostly in and around Sydney.

== Reception ==
The series did not screen until October 1975. It was not a ratings success and did not sell well overseas. TV critic Don Storey wrote that "not only was Shannon's Mob Fauna's least successful production, it was one of the least remembered series of Australian television's first twenty years."

In 1976 Robinson said it was unlikely that the series would ever recover its costs.

== List of episodes ==
1. Without Incident
2. Nothing Else To Lose
3. Trip To Nowhere
4. There Was A Man
5. Stock In Trade
6. Hotspot
7. When Collier Came
8. Mixed Doubles
9. Loser Takes All
10. The Playpen
11. Peace Lovers
12. You've Got To Have Credentials
13. Heart Of Oak
