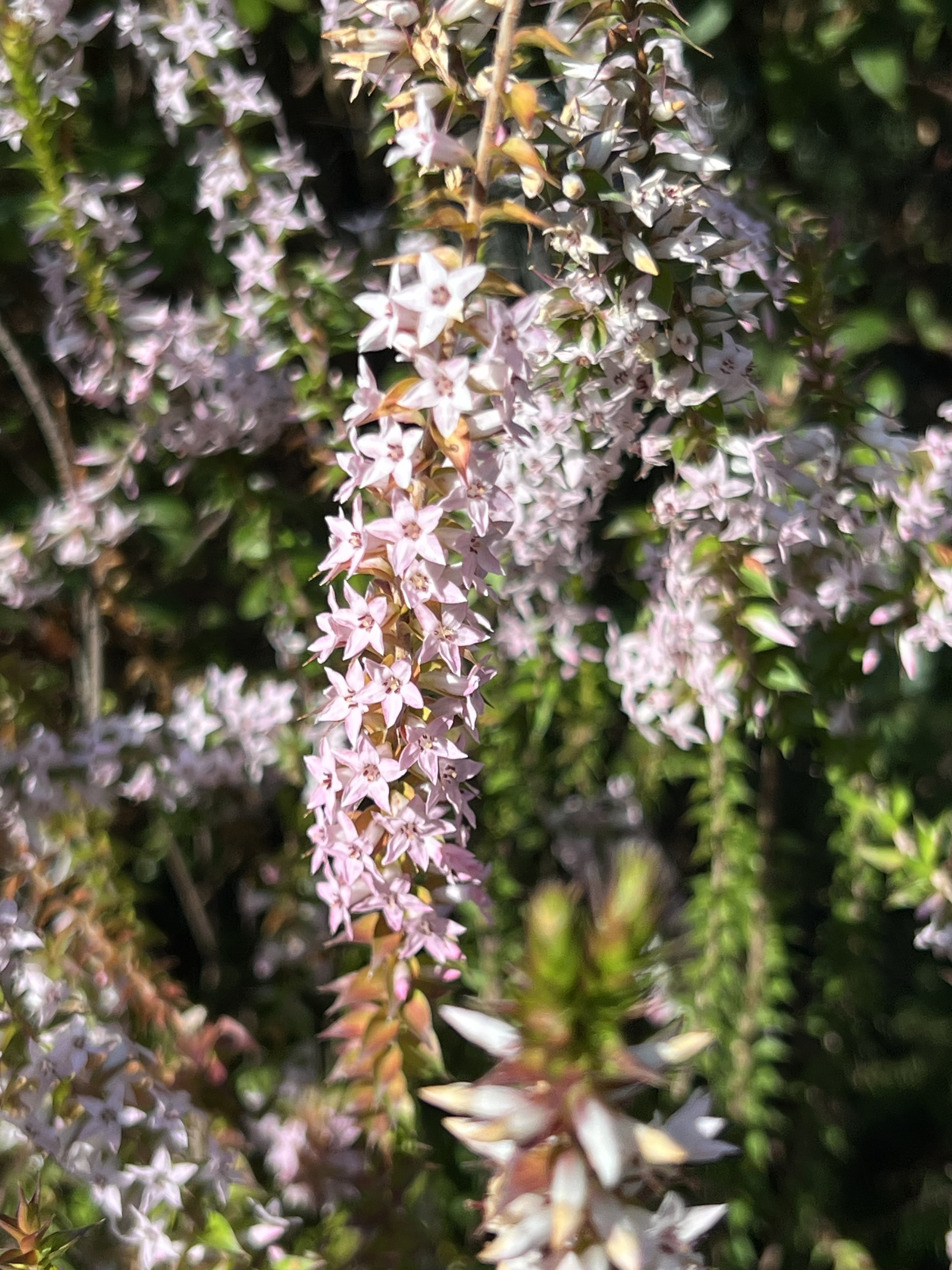
- Epacris purpurascens var. purpurascens growing in the ANBG

Conservation status
- Vulnerable (EPBC Act)

Scientific classification
- Kingdom: Plantae
- Clade: Tracheophytes
- Clade: Angiosperms
- Clade: Eudicots
- Clade: Asterids
- Order: Ericales
- Family: Ericaceae
- Genus: Epacris
- Species: E. purpurascens Banks ex Sims
- Variety: E. p. var. purpurascens

Trinomial name
- Epacris purpurascens var. purpurascens

Synonyms
- Lysinema purpurascens (Banks ex Sims) Courtois

= Epacris purpurascens var. purpurascens =

Variety of flowering plant

Epacris purpurascens var. purpurascens is rare Australian plant from the heath family.

== Habitat and distribution ==
Commonly known as the Port Jackson heath, this small plant grows in swamps and scrubby country on sandstone based soils around the Gosford and Sydney region of central eastern New South Wales. See also Epacris purpurascens var. onosmiflora.
