= John McCallum (actor) =

Australian actor (1918–2010)

- McCallum in The Loves of Joanna Godden (1947)
- Born: John Neil McCallum; 14 March 1918; Brisbane, Queensland, Australia
- Died: 3 February 2010 (aged 91); Sydney, New South Wales, Australia
- Education: Anglican Church Grammar School, Brisbane
- Alma mater: Royal Academy of Dramatic Art
- Occupations: Actor; television producer; studio executive
- Years active: c.1935–1988
- Spouse: Googie Withers (m. 1948)
- Children: 3, including Joanna

John Neil McCallum (14 March 1918 – 3 February 2010) was an Australian theatre and film actor, highly successful in the United Kingdom. He was also a television producer.

== Early life ==
McCallum was born on 14 March 1918. His father, John Neil McCallum Sr., was a theatre owner and entrepreneur, who built and for many years ran the 2,000 seat Cremorne Theatre on the banks of the Brisbane River. After emigrating from Scotland, McCallum Snr. became an accomplished musician and was soon heavily involved in Brisbane's entertainment scene. His mother was an accomplished amateur actress who was born in England.

In 1918, McCallum Jr. was born in Brisbane during the opening night of a comedy performance. After his birth, a family friend sent his father a wire: 'Congratulations on two howling successes'.

McCallum was exposed to acting at a young age: his early childhood was full of backstage encounters at the Cremorne with the wide variety of performers who frequented his father's theatre. Although McCallum and his two younger brothers received their primary school education in the United Kingdom, the family returned to Australia once the Great Depression started. His secondary education was at the Anglican Church Grammar School in Brisbane.

His early theatrical training was with Barbara Sisely at the Brisbane Repertory Company.

== Britain ==
McCallum later did two years at RADA in London under Kenneth Barnes and his sisters Violet and Irene Vanbrugh. From there he went into repertory at Tonbridge and Northampton.

In 1939 he did a season at Stratford-upon-Avon playing small roles and understudying. From there he moved to similar roles at the Old Vic under Harley Granville-Barker in which he appeared in the historic 1939 production of King Lear which featured Jack Hawkins with Peggy Ashcroft, Fay Compton and Cathleen Nesbitt.

== Second World War – Australia ==
McCallum returned to Australia shortly afterwards to join the Second Australian Imperial Force (2nd AIF) for the duration of World War II, in which he served in New Guinea. After the war he joined JC Williamson's for a while, working with Gladys Moncrieff in The Maid of the Mountains. He appeared in the Australian film A Son Is Born (1946) which also starred Muriel Steinbeck and Ron Randell. According to Filmink McCallum "seems unsure how to pitch his voice and has the most thankless role (playing Mr Perfect), but he does have charisma."

== Return to Britain ==
Because there were limited theatrical choices in Australia, McCallum returned to Britain. He tested for a small part in The Root of All Evil (1947) and was given the second male lead. He was also in The Loves of Joanna Godden (1947) and It Always Rains on Sunday (1947). Both starred Googie Withers, whom McCallum married in 1948. McCallum then made The Calendar (1948); Miranda (1948), a popular comedy with Glynis Johns and Withers; A Boy, a Girl and a Bike (1948), directed by fellow Australian Ralph Smart; The Woman in Question (1950) with Jean Kent and Dirk Bogarde; Valley of Eagles (1951); Lady Godiva Rides Again (1951) from director Frank Launder; The Magic Box (1951), one of many cameos; The Long Memory (1952) with John Mills. He did two for Herbert Wilcox, Trent's Last Case (1952) with Margaret Lockwood and Derby Day (1952) with Anna Neagle and Withers. McCallum was in the biopic Melba (1953), then made Trouble in the Glen (1954) for Wilcox. He and Withers teamed for Devil on Horseback (1954) and Port of Escape (1956). He returned to Australia to play a role in Smiley (1956).

He appeared with Withers on the West End stage in the play Waiting for Gillian by Ronald Millar.

== J.C. Williamson ==
McCallum and his wife Googie Withers made their home in Australia from 1958 when McCallum became joint managing director of J. C. Williamson's alongside Sir Frank Tait. McCallum was keen to encourage the casting of talented Australians in leading roles and was instrumental in beginning the starring careers of Kevin Colson, Jill Perryman, Nancye Hayes, Barbara Angell and others.

== Producer ==
McCallum went into producing in association with Lee Robinson. They made Skippy the Bush Kangaroo (1966–70) which was a huge success, although a feature film based on it, The Intruders (1969) was not.

McCallum and Robinson went on to produce the series Barrier Reef (1971–72), Boney (1972–73), Shannon's Mob (1976), and Bailey's Bird. McCallum also wrote, directed and produced the film Nickel Queen (1971) which starred Withers.

He and Robinson went into film production with Attack Force Z (1981) and The Highest Honour (1983).

McCallum continued to act during his career as a producer, on his own shows and for others. He frequently appeared on stage. A particular favourite role was in The Circle by William Somerset Maugham. In this production he acted alongside Googie Withers in the UK as well as in Australia.

== Honours ==
His contribution to the Australian performing arts was considerable and, in 1971, he was made a Commander of the Order of the British Empire (CBE). In 1992, he was made an Officer of the Order of Australia (AO). Both honours were made for services to drama and theatre.

McCallum was a JC Williamson Award recipient for lifetime achievement in 1999. In 1992 Googie Withers and John McCallum were founding patrons and active supporters of the Tait Memorial Trust in London, a charity established by Isla Baring, the daughter of Sir Frank Tait of JC Williamson's to support young Australian performing artists in the UK.

== Death ==
McCallum died in Sydney on 3 February 2010, at the age of 91. He had been suffering from leukaemia.

== Selected filmography ==
=== As actor ===
- Heritage (1935) – minor role (uncredited)
- A Son Is Born (1946) – John Seldon
- The Root of All Evil (1947) – Joe Bartle
- The Loves of Joanna Godden (1947) – Arthur Alce
- Bush Christmas (1947) – narrator (voice)
- It Always Rains on Sunday (1947) – Tommy Swann
- Miranda (1948) – Nigel Hood
- The Calendar (1948) – Capt. Garry Anson
- A Boy, a Girl and a Bike (1949) – David Howarth
- The Woman in Question (1950) – Michael Murray
- Traveller's Joy (1950) – Reggie Pelham
- The Magic Box (1951) – Sitter in Bath Studio
- Valley of Eagles (1951) – Dr. Nils Ahlen
- Lady Godiva Rides Again (1951) – Larry Burns
- Derby Day (1952) – Tommy Dillon
- Trent's Last Case (1952) – John Marlowe
- The Long Memory (1953) – Supt. Bob Lowther
- Melba (1953) – Charles Armstrong
- Devil on Horseback (1954) – Charles Roberts
- Trouble in the Glen (1954) – Malcolm MacFarr
- Three in One (1955) – Introductions
- Port of Escape (1956) – Mitch Gillis
- Smiley (1956) – Jim Rankin

=== As producer ===
- Skippy the Bush Kangaroo (1966–70) (TV series)
- Nickel Queen (1971) (film) (also writer/director)
- Barrier Reef (1971–72) (TV series)
- Boney (1972–73) (TV series)
- Shannon's Mob (1976) (TV series)
- Bailey's Bird (1979) (TV series)
- Attack Force Z (1981) (film)
- The Highest Honour (1983) (film)

== Theatre ==
- King Lear (1939) at Old Vic
- The Maid of the Mountains
- Waiting for Gillian on the West End
- The Circle in Australia / UK
