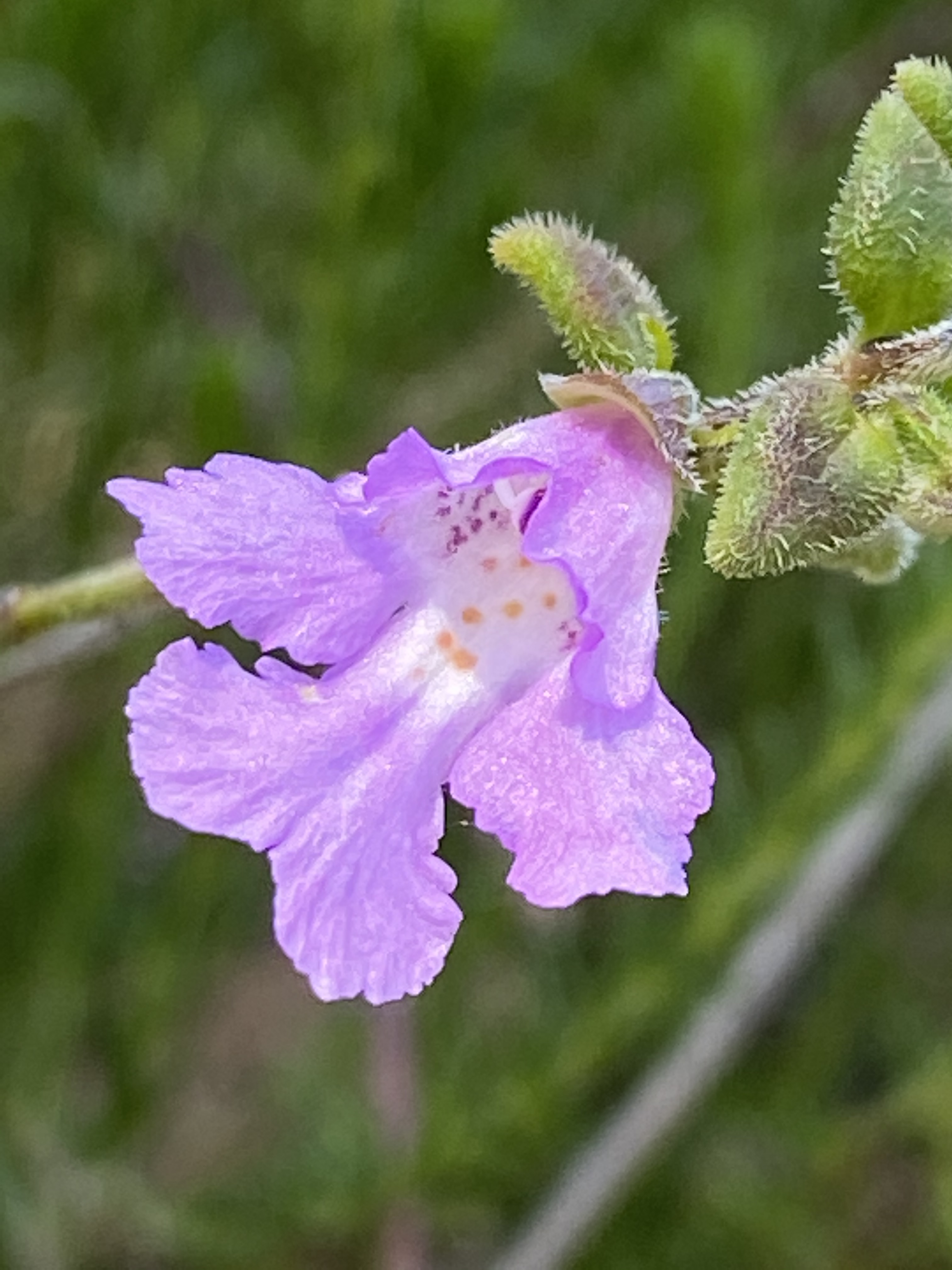

Conservation status
- Critically endangered (EPBC Act)

Scientific classification
- Kingdom: Plantae
- Clade: Tracheophytes
- Clade: Angiosperms
- Clade: Eudicots
- Clade: Asterids
- Order: Lamiales
- Family: Lamiaceae
- Genus: Prostanthera
- Species: P. marifolia

Binomial name
- Prostanthera marifolia R.Br.
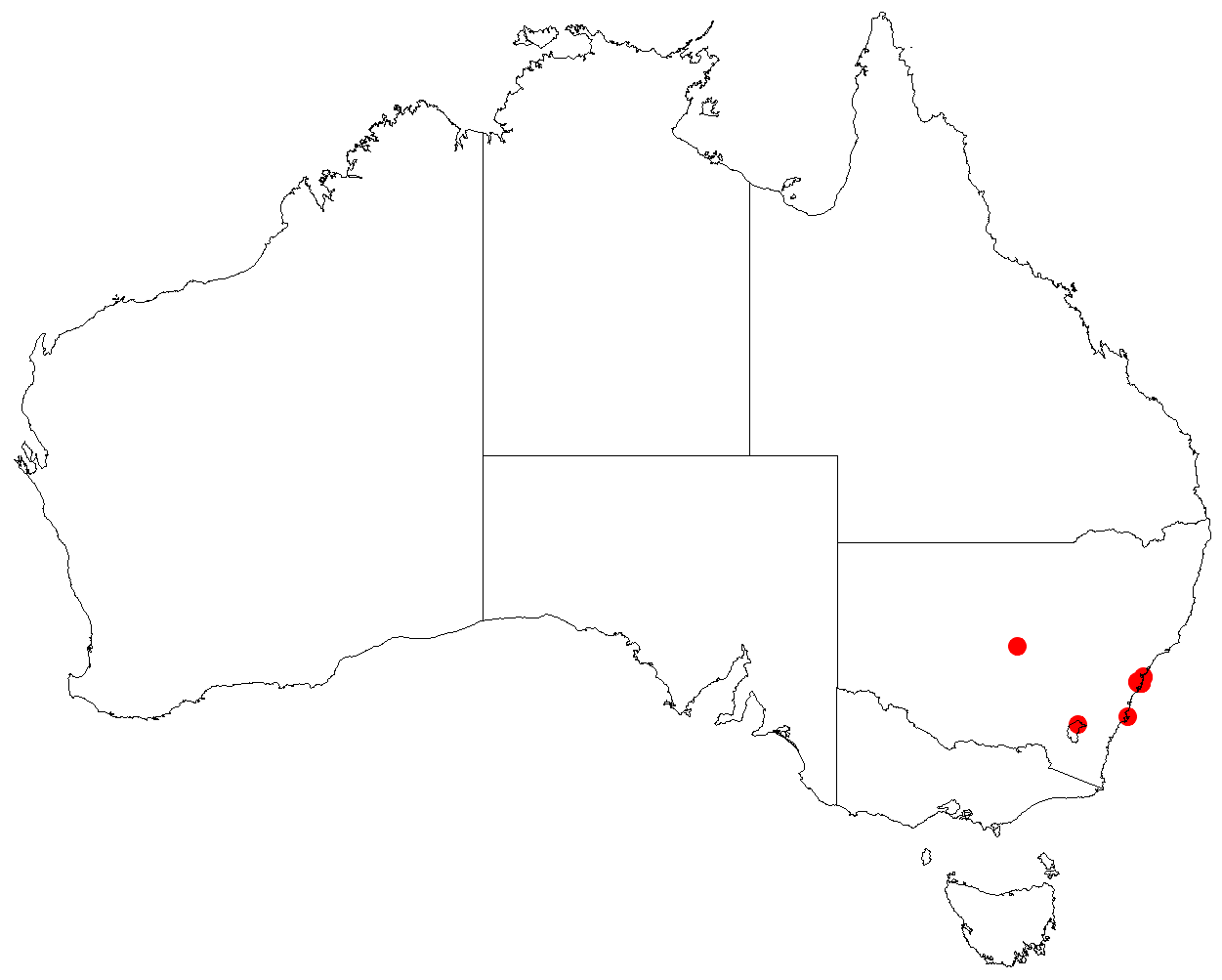
- Occurrence data from AVH

Synonyms
- Prostanthera sp. 'Manly Dam' (Conn 4444)

= Prostanthera marifolia =

Seaforth mintbush

Species of flowering plant

Prostanthera marifolia, commonly known as Seaforth mintbush, is a species of flowering plant that is endemic to a restricted area of New South Wales. It is a small, erect, openly branched shrub with egg-shaped to elliptic leaves, and purple to mauve flowers arranged in leaf axils.

== Description ==
Prostanthera marifolia is an erect, openly branched shrub that typically grows to a height of 0.3 m (1 ft 0 in) with hairy branches. The leaves are egg-shaped to elliptic, sometimes appearing slightly triangular when the edges are strongly curved downwards, 8–12 mm (0.31–0.47 in) long and 4–6 mm (0.16–0.24 in) wide on a petiole 0.5–1 mm (0.020–0.039 in) long. The flowers are arranged in leaf axils with bracteoles 1–1.5 mm (0.039–0.059 in) long at the base. The sepals are 3.5–5.5 mm (0.14–0.22 in) long forming a tube 1.3–2 mm (0.051–0.079 in) long with two lobes, the upper lobe 2.5–3.6 mm (0.098–0.142 in) long. The petals are purple to mauve and 9–12 mm (0.35–0.47 in) long. Flowering probably occurs throughout the year and the fruit is 1.5–1.8 mm (0.059–0.071 in) long.

== Taxonomy ==
Prostanthera marifolia was first formally described in 1810 by Robert Brown in Prodromus Florae Novae Hollandiae et Insulae Van Diemen, based on plant material collected on the north shore of Port Jackson.

== Distribution and habitat ==
Seaforth mintbush is only known from the northern Sydney suburb of Seaforth where it grows on ridge-tops with Eucalyptus sieberi and Corymbia gummifera in or near the endangered Duffys Forest ecological community.

== Conservation status ==
This mintbush was thought to be extinct, not having been collected since 1810, but was rediscovered in 2001 and subsequently classified as "critically endangered" under the Australian Government Environment Protection and Biodiversity Conservation Act 1999 and the New South Wales Government Biodiversity Conservation Act 2016. The main threats to the species are its small population size, habitat degradation from weed invasion, herbicide drift, stormwater runoff, rubbish dumping and trampling.
