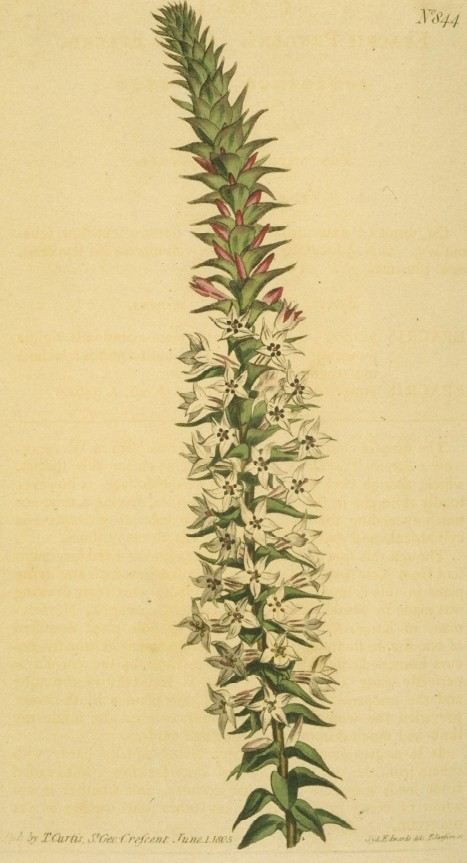
- Painting by Sydenham Edwards

Scientific classification
- Kingdom: Plantae
- Clade: Tracheophytes
- Clade: Angiosperms
- Clade: Eudicots
- Clade: Asterids
- Order: Ericales
- Family: Ericaceae
- Genus: Epacris
- Species: E. purpurascens
- Variety: E. p. var. onosmiflora

Trinomial name
- Epacris purpurascens var. onosmiflora Maiden & Betche

Synonyms
- Epacris onosmiflora A.Cunn.

= Epacris purpurascens var. onosmiflora =

Variety of flowering plant

Epacris purpurascens var. onosmiflora is a small Australian plant from the heath family. It grows on sandstone based soils in the Blue Mountains region of central eastern New South Wales.

See also Epacris purpurascens var. purpurascens.
