= Meet Me on the Corner =

Meet Me On The Corner may refer to:

- "Meet Me On The Corner", hit song by Max Bygraves Roberts, Hart 1955, covered by The Coronets With Eric Jupp And His Orchestra 1956
- "Meet Me On The Corner", hit song from the album Fog on the Tyne by Lindisfarne, Rod Clements, 1972
- "Meet Me On The Corner", song by Jerry Cole Cole
- "Meet Me On The Corner", song by Herbie Flowers Webley, Flowers
- "Meet Me on the Corner Down at Joe's Cafe", 1974 hit song by Peter Noone
