= The Castlereagh Line =

Australian radio serial

The Castlereagh Line is an Australian radio serial and series of 7 novels, written by the late Ross Napier.

Initially contracted for 65 episodes in 1982, the radio serial ran for 910 episodes and was aired on over 100 stations nationally and internationally, more than any Australian radio serial ever. At a time when radio drama had long been put out to pasture, 2WS saw its potential. The program was so popular that factories downed tools to enable the staff to listen to it. According to an article in The Sydney Morning Herald in 1984 "Devotees are continually ringing the station to find out what will happen in the next three weeks as they have to know, or they can't go on holiday". The radio serial has been re-run nationally several times over and continues to run to this day.

During the course of The Line's initial broadcast from 1982 to 1986, Ross wrote the first three Castlereagh novels: The Castlereagh Line, The Castlereagh Way and The Colours of Castlereagh. The books were sold in all major and most independent bookstores nationally, including Angus & Robertson, Dymocks and Collins, with Line and Way going into reprint due to popular demand, selling just shy of 20,000 copies each.

Over the next few years came four more Castlereagh novels: The Castlereagh Heritage, The Castlereagh Rose, The Castlereagh Crown, and The Castlereagh Cross.

The never-before-published grand finale, The Castlereagh Requiem, was drafted before Ross passed in 2004. The manuscript is currently being edited by his daughter Linzi Napier who has formed Castlereagh Productions with Jacqui Law-Smith. The company plans to re-release the novels, record an updated version of the audio series for radio and podcast, as well as turning the successful Australian Saga into a television series.

== Plot ==
Nineteen-year-old Carlotta Clemens leaves her dearest friend and the safety of their home in Brisbane to take a job as governess on a remote Queensland cattle station. Attacked by her employer and fearing for her life, she murders him in self-defence and escapes on horseback to the outback mining town of Cloncurry. Changing her name to escape detection, she finds work as a barmaid under the pseudonym Lottie Long. It is 2 January 1880.

Three months later, 'Black' Jack Seager appears in her saloon bar. Despite his dangerously aggressive manner, she senses in him an opportunity for escape, and together they travel south, eventually settling in Tamworth. Now pregnant with his child, she poses as Mrs Seager, and partnering with horse trader Mat Gore, they use blood money to establish the Castlereagh Coach Company, a coach line servicing northern New South Wales.

The company flourishes, and with the help of corrupt politician Simon Summers, they secure the New South Wales mail contracts to subsidise expansion. New South Wales is not enough, however. Queensland is crucial, and to secure the contracts, Jack deserts Lottie on the day of their son's birth and courts the daughter of Queensland's Postmaster General.

Determined to expose him, Lottie arrives in Toowoomba on his wedding day, only to be savagely assaulted and left in no doubt as to Jack's deadly intentions should she get in his way ever again.

Hell hath no fury. Lottie sells her shares in Castlereagh and with the duplicitous aid of Simon Summers, uses Jack's transport empire to build her own chain of hotels along every Castlereagh route.

Jack cannot be bested. Hell-bent on revenge, his obsession with Lottie spans two decades as he blazes a trail of infamy and mayhem, destroying all in his path.

== Broadcast ==
Between 2 February 2009 and 16 November 2011, the serial was broadcast as part of the Bob Rogers Show on 2CH in Sydney, and until 9 October 2013 on Nightline with Bruce & Phil on 3AW in Melbourne.

It is currently heard on a variety of stations, including 2NURFM Newcastle, 4KZ Innisfail, Golden Days Radio Melbourne and Yass FM Yass.
