= Hollie Chapman =

British actress (born in 1988)

Hollie Chapman (born in 1988 in Gaddesby in Leicestershire, England) is an English actress.

== Career ==
She was trained in acting at the Sylvia Young Theatre School in London. Around 1996 she appeared as Tessie in a West End production of Annie. She acted also in The Sound of Music as Maria, in Annie (village production), the title role, in Whistle Down the Wind (West End production) and in Smike.

She got her first TV role in 2001, in an episode of the UK TV serial Holby City. In 2002 she played in the Channel 5 TV serial Don't Blame Me (or Don't Blame the Koalas), regularly appearing as Gemma King, a lovable and arrogant English girl who goes with her brother and mother to Australia. In 2006 she was the voice of the soft puppet Cuddle in Softies, a pre-school TV-series. Softies (aired since 2003) is a TV serial with 80 episodes. Each episode has a duration of 5 minutes. In 2006 she acted in two episodes of Doctors, the British television soap opera.

In the British radio soap opera The Archers on BBC Radio 4 she plays Alice Carter (née Aldridge). In 2011 she played the character also in Ambridge Extra, a spin-off about the radio drama's younger characters.

== Filmography ==
- Holby City (2001) (Episode: Forgiveness of Sins) as Ruth Boul
- Don't Blame Me (or Don't Blame the Koalas) (2002) as Gemma King
- Softies (2006) as Cuddle (Voice-over only)
- Doctors (2006) (Episode: Marilyn, Sometimes) as Kirsty Wheeler
- Doctors (2006) (Episode: Trust) as Kirsty Wheeler
