= Barrier Reef (TV series) =

- Also known as: "Minus Five"
- Genre: Adventure
- Created by: Fauna Productions
- Developed by: John McCallum and Lee Robinson
- Directed by: Brian Faull; Eric Fullilove
- Creative directors: Ron Taylor; director of underwater photography
- Starring: Joe James; Harold Hopkins; Ken James; George Assang; Rowena Wallace
- Theme music composer: Eric Jupp
- Country of origin: Australia
- Original language: English
- No. of seasons: 1
- No. of episodes: 39

Production
- Production locations: North Queensland, Great Barrier Reef
- Running time: 30 minutes
- Production company: D.L. Taffner

Original release
- Network: The 0-10 Network
- Release: 12 February 1971 – 2 May 1972

Barrier Reef is an Australian television series that was first screened domestically in 1971. However, nineteen episodes had already premiered on British television on BBC1 between 5 October 1970 and 15 February 1971 and four more aired between 5 April and 3 May 1971, in advance of Australian broadcast.

== Premise ==
Barrier Reef was about a group of marine biologists on board a sailing ship called the New Endeavour, researching around the Great Barrier Reef, off Queensland, Australia. "It was the first series in the world to feature extensive colour underwater filming on location".

== Cast ==
=== Main ===
- Joe James as Ted King
- Harold Hopkins as Steve Gabo
- Ken James as Kip Young
- George Assang as Jack Meurauki
- Rowena Wallace as Tracey Deane
- Helen Morse as Joan Norris
- Judy Morris as Gail Smith
- John McCallum as Gordon Lewis
- Tristan Rogers

=== Guests ===
- Ben Gabriel as Sergeant Dwyer
- Don Crosby as Dave McPhie
- Judy McBurney as Annette Conway
- Judy Morris as Gail Smith
- Kevin Miles as Edwards
- Reg Gorman as George
- Ric Hutton as Hyles
- Richard Meikle as Joe Francis
- Stewart Ginn as Travis
- Terry McDermott as Commander Finch

== Production ==
Filming for the series began at Hayman Island in September 1969. The show was almost entirely filmed in North Queensland and at the time the show was reported to be the most expensive series ever produced in Australia and one of the few Australian series to be produced outside Sydney or Melbourne. Barrier Reef was produced by Fauna Productions who also created the uniquely Australian hit TV series Skippy the Bush Kangaroo, using some of the same crew and cast members.

Like the Skippy series, Barrier Reef showcased iconic Australian locations in colour film as the series was intended for an international audience (despite Australia not broadcasting colour television at that time). The show was screened in many countries across the world, giving international audiences a glimpse of what the stereotypical Australia was like.

The show was originally called Minus 5.

== Reception ==
In contrast to TV shows like Riptide or The Outsiders this series was made in Australia, using Australian scripts, featuring Australian leading actors, and covering scientific topics that were uncommon on TV. It was broadcast by BBC, in the US by NBC, and also by TV stations in Canada, Japan, South America, South Africa and numerous European countries. The series had 39 episodes. It was re-run in various markets for many years.

In 1976 Robinson said the series had just recovered its costs.

== See also ==
- Ron Taylor
- Valerie Taylor
