= Bailey's Bird =

- Written by: Michael Jenkins; Don Houghton; Ross Napier
- Directed by: Igor Auzins; Michael Jenkins; Peter Maxwell; Simon Wincer; Howard Rubie
- Starring: Hu Pryce; Mark Lee; Hussein Abu Hassan; Noor Azizah
- Country of origin: Australia
- Original language: English
- No. of seasons: 1
- No. of episodes: 26

Production
- Producers: John McCallum; Lee Robinson
- Production company: Fauna Productions

Original release
- Network: Seven Network
- Release: 25 March 1979

Bailey's Bird is an Australian TV series which was filmed in Asia. It was about a pilot and his son operating a charter operation in South East Asia.

== Cast ==
- Hu Pryce
- Mark Lee as Nick
- Hussein Abu Hassan as Inspector Hamid
- Noor Azizah

== Episodes ==
1. Hijack
2. Friend or Foe
3. A Funny Kind of Hero
4. The Old Monk
5. Outposts of Empire
6. The Search
7. Archeologist
8. Gift Horse
9. The Fishermen
10. The Chinese Coffin
11. Double Trouble
12. Open and Shut
13. Faded Tiger
14. Burning Bright
15. Blow the Man Down
16. A Man of Property
17. The Birthday Present
18. When the Band Begins to Play
19. Ghost with Gold Bangles
20. The Binatang Man
21. Bailey's Big Deal
22. Garland of Tears
23. The Otter Man
24. The Man from Mars
25. May Day
26. Touchdown
