= Nickel Queen =

- Directed by: John McCallum
- Written by: Henry C. James; John McCallum; Joy Cavill
- Based on: a story by Henry C. James; Anneke James
- Produced by: John McCallum; Joy Cavill
- Starring: Googie Withers; John Laws
- Cinematography: John J. Williams
- Edited by: Don Saunders
- Music by: Sven Libaek
- Production company: Woomera Productions
- Distributed by: British Empire Films
- Release date: 1 April 1971 (Australia)
- Running time: 89 minutes
- Country: Australia
- Language: English
- Budget: $500,000

Nickel Queen is a 1971 Australian comedy film starring Googie Withers and directed by her husband John McCallum. The story was loosely based on the Poseidon bubble, a nickel boom in Western Australia in the late 1960s, and tells of an outback pub owner who stakes a claim and finds herself an overnight millionaire.

== Plot ==
Meg Blake is the widowed owner of a pub in a small desert town in Western Australia. Corrupt American mining executive Ed Benson starts the rumour of a nickel discovery to sell shares to gullible investors. Meg heeds the rumour and stakes the first claim. Benson promotes her as the "Nickel Queen".

Hippie Claude Fitzherbert follows Meg into Perth high society and becomes her lover. Benson is exposed as a fraud, Fitzherbert deserts Meg and runs off with Benson's wife and Meg is reunited with an old suitor from her hometown.

== Cast ==
- Googie Withers as Meg Blake
- John Laws as Claude Fitzherbert
- Alfred Sandor as Ed Benson
- Ed Devereaux as Harry Phillips
- Peter Gwynne as Andy Kyle
- Doreen Warburton as Betsy Benson
- Tom Oliver as Roy Olding
- Joanna McCallum as Jenny Blake
- Ross Thompson as Arthur
- Eileen Colocott as Beatrice Whittaker
- Maurice Ogden as Ernest Whittaker
- Sir David Brand as himself
- Sir Charles Court as himself
- Arthur Griffith as himself

== Production ==
The original story was co-written by Henry James, an Australian journalist who had worked in England since the 1930s. It was inspired by the 1969–70 Poseidon nickel boom in Western Australia. British film producer Sydney Box, who had retired to Perth, sent a copy of the script to John McCallum who had just finished making the TV series Barrier Reef and was interesting in moving back into features. Finance was raised from a Perth syndicate, which included the local Channel Seven and Fauna Productions in Sydney.

Shooting started in November 1970 and took place in Perth and in the mining town of Broad Arrow. The film was full of plugs for companies which helped finance the film and cameos from West Australian politicians, including Premier Sir David Brand and Minister for Industrial Development Charles Court.

Radio personality John Laws was cast in the lead after impressing John McCallum with his performance in an episode of the TV series Skippy the Bush Kangaroo. Alfred Sandor came out to Australia to play opposite Googie Withers in Plaza Suite and decided to stay.

== Release ==
The film was highly popular in Perth, running for six months. It did less well in the eastern states.

== See also ==
- Cinema of Australia
