= Fauna Productions =

Australian film and TV production company

- Industry: Television and Film production
- Founder: Lee Robinson, Lionel Austin, John McCallum

Fauna Productions is an Australian TV and film production company established by Lee Robinson, Lionel ('Bob') Austin and John McCallum who met during the making of the film They're a Weird Mob (1966).

Robinson, Austin and McCallum had a view to make productions aimed at the international audience and enjoyed great success with the TV series Skippy the Bush Kangaroo and Barrier Reef.

Fauna Productions is still in business, now being run by two sons of the founders, Philip Austin and Nick McCallum.

== Select credits ==
- Skippy the Bush Kangaroo (1966–69) - TV series
- The Intruders (1969) - film
- Nickel Queen (1971) - film
- Barrier Reef (1971–72) - TV series
- Boney (1972–73) - TV series
- Shannon's Mob (1975–76) - TV series
- Bailey's Bird (1977) - TV series
- Attack Force Z (1981) - film
- The Highest Honor (1983) - film
