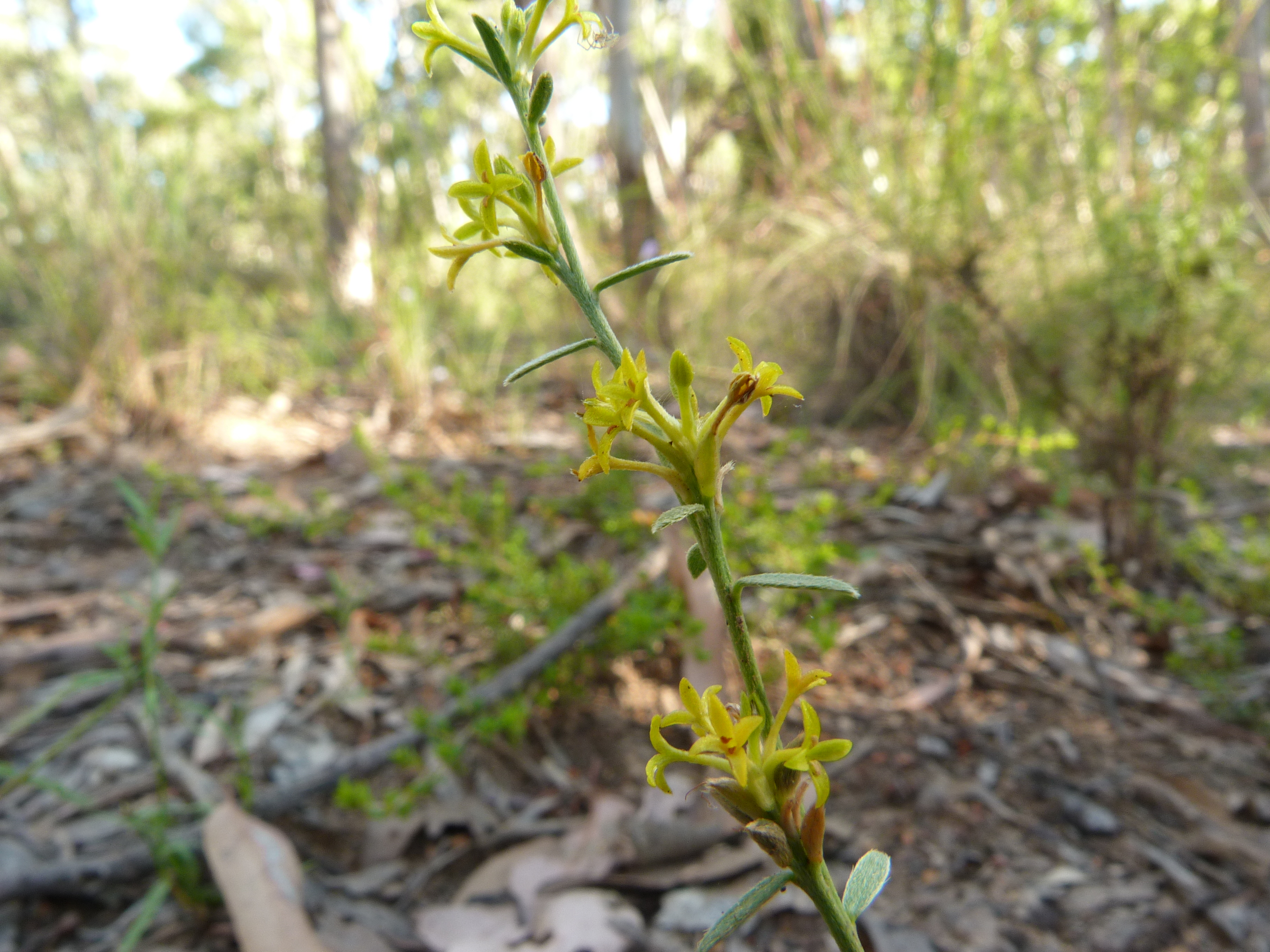
- Pimelea curviflora on Black Mountain

Scientific classification
- Kingdom: Plantae
- Clade: Tracheophytes
- Clade: Angiosperms
- Clade: Eudicots
- Clade: Rosids
- Order: Malvales
- Family: Thymelaeaceae
- Genus: Pimelea
- Species: P. curviflora

Binomial name
- Pimelea curviflora R.Br.

Synonyms
- Banksia curviflora (R.Br.) Kuntze; Calyptrostegia curviflora (R.Br.) C.A.Mey.; Pimelea congesta Benth. nom. inval., pro syn.

= Pimelea curviflora =

Curved rice-flower

Species of plant

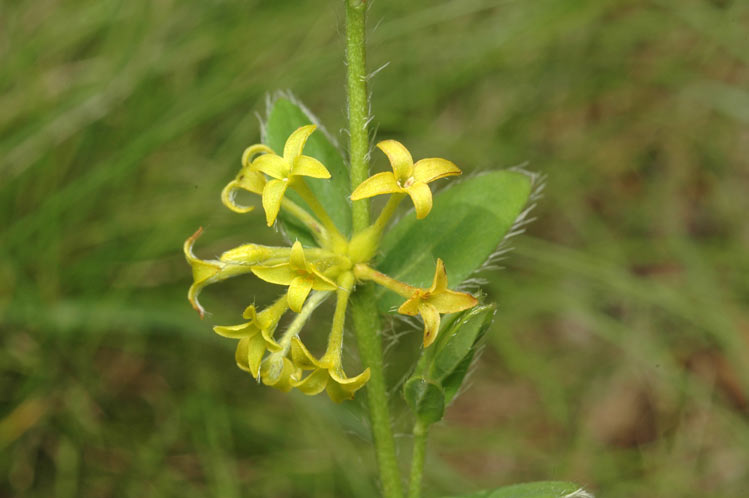
Var. acuta in Namadgi National Park

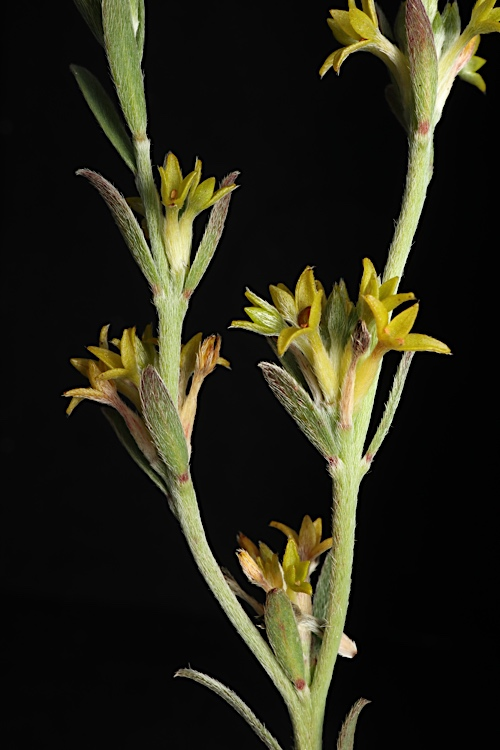
Var. sericea near Bungendore

Pimelea curviflora, also known as curved rice-flower, is a shrub in the family Thymelaeaceae and is endemic to Australia. It is a small, hairy shrub with greenish-yellow or red tubular flowers.

== Description ==
Pimelea curviflora is a small understory woody shrub 20–150 cm (7.9–59.1 in) high with soft hairy stems. The yellowish-green leaves are elliptic, lance or egg-shaped 5–20 mm (0.20–0.79 in) long, 2–8 mm (0.079–0.315 in) wide and hairy on both sides. The leaves are arranged in opposite pairs or alternately, on a short petiole and end in a pointed tip. The upper leaf hairs are spreading or flattened then becoming silky, short and somewhat less twisted, upper leaf surface smooth or with shorter hairs. The leaves may be uniformly coloured or vary on the upperside or underneath. The 6-20 compact, green-yellow or sometimes reddish, female or bi-sexual flowers have a floral tube 5–12 mm (0.20–0.47 in) long and flaring at the tips, usually hairy and arranged in heads at the end of branches or in leaf axils. The flower bracts may be absent or not conspicuous, the style 2–5 mm (0.079–0.197 in) long, sometimes shorter in female flowers and the pedicels hairy. The dry, green fruit are 2–4 mm (0.079–0.157 in) long. Flowering occurs from late spring to early summer.

== Taxonomy and naming ==
Pimelea curviflora was first formally described in 1810 Robert Brown and the description was published in Prodromus florae Novae Hollandiae et insulae Van-Diemen, exhibens characteres plantarum quas annis 1802-1805. The specific epithet (curviflora) is derived from the Latin curvi- meaning "curved" and -florus meaning "-flowered".

Varieties of P. curviflora have been described, and the following have been accepted by the Australian Plant Census:

- Pimelea curviflora var. acuta Threlfall, a much-branched subshrub 15–50 cm (5.9–19.7 in) high with narrowly elliptic to elliptic leaves 5–15 mm (0.20–0.59 in) long and 2–5 mm (0.079–0.197 in) wide, and clusters of 5 to 14 greenish-yellow flowers 9–10 mm (0.35–0.39 in) long. Flowering occurs from November to February and the fruit is straight.
- Pimelea curviflora R.Br. var. curviflora, a much-branched shrub or subshrub 20–120 cm (7.9–47.2 in) high with narrowly elliptic to elliptic or lance-shaped leaves 5–10 mm (0.20–0.39 in) long and 2–4 mm (0.079–0.157 in) wide, and clusters of 4 to 12 red to yellow flowers 6–8 mm (0.24–0.31 in) long. Flowering occurs in most months with a peak from October to January, and the fruit is curved.
- Pimelea curviflora var. divergens Threlfall, a tufted subshrub 20–50 cm (7.9–19.7 in) high with narrowly elliptic leaves 5–22 mm (0.20–0.87 in) long and 2–4 mm (0.079–0.157 in) wide, clusters of 7 to 22 greenish-yellow flowers 5–9 mm (0.20–0.35 in) long. Flowering main occurs from September to January and the fruit is straight.
- Pimelea curviflora var. gracilis (R.Br.) Threlfall, a shrub 15–50 cm (5.9–19.7 in) high with narrowly elliptic to elliptic, or narrowly egg-shaped to egg-shaped leaves 4–20 mm (0.16–0.79 in) long and 1–6 mm (0.039–0.236 in) wide, clusters of 4 to 22 greenish-yellow flowers 8–10 mm (0.31–0.39 in) long. Flowering occurs from July to January and the fruit is straight, or occasionally curved.
- Pimelea curviflora var. sericea Benth., a subshrub 15–30 cm (5.9–11.8 in) high with narrowly elliptic leaves 6–19 mm (0.24–0.75 in) long and 1–7 mm (0.039–0.276 in) wide, clusters of usually 5 to 20 greenish-yellow flowers 6–9 mm (0.24–0.35 in) long. Flowering occurs throughout the year with a peak from October to January, and the fruit is straight.
- Pimelea curviflora var. subglabrata Threlfall, a subshrub 15–30 cm (5.9–11.8 in) high with linear to narrowly elliptic or lance-shaped leaves 5–11 mm (0.20–0.43 in) long and about 2 mm (0.079 in) wide, clusters of usually 6 to 16 greenish-yellow flowers 5–7 mm (0.20–0.28 in) long, and straight fruit.

== Distribution and habitat ==
Curved rice-flower is a variable widespread species found growing in New South Wales, south-eastern South Australia, south-eastern Queensland on or near the Great Dividing Range and coastal areas from Brisbane to Adelaide. It grows in forests, grassland and woodlands amongst acacia, eucalypt, callitris, usually on clay and shale soils. Also in rainforest amongst vine thickets. A common, widespread species in Victoria including montane woodland also found in Tasmania.

Variety acuta grows in forest and woodland at altitudes between 750 and 1,500 m (2,460 and 4,920 ft) from near Mount Kosciuszko to the Budawang Range in New South Wales and the Australian Capital Territory. Variety curviflora is restricted to coastal areas around Sydney where it grows on sandstone. Variety divergens is widespread on the coast, ranges and western slopes from the Boyne River in Queensland to the Sydney region. Variety gracilis usually grows in forest, sometimes in rocky sites, and is widespread from the extreme south-east of Queensland, through eastern New South Wales and southern Victoria to south-eastern South Australia and northern Tasmania. Variety sericea grows in sandy soil in open forest from the extreme south-east of Queensland, in eastern New South Wales and Victoria, where it is widespread, to south-eastern South Australia and islands of the Furneaux Group in Tasmania. Variety subglabrata grows in scrub and pastures from the Goulburn River to Nowra in New South Wales.

== Conservation status ==
Pimelea curviflora var. curviflora is listed as "vulnerable" under the Australian Government Environment Protection and Biodiversity Conservation Act 1999 and the New South Wales Government Biodiversity Conservation Act 2016. The main threats to the species include habitat loss and degradation, weed invasion and road and trail maintenance.
