= Duffys Forest =

- Suburb
- Interactive map of Duffys Forest
- Country: Australia
- State: New South Wales
- City: Sydney
- LGA: Northern Beaches Council
- Location: 28 km (17 mi) north of Sydney CBD

Government
  - State electorate: Pittwater
  - Federal division: Mackellar
- Elevation: 184 m (604 ft)

Population
  - Total: 509 (2021 census)
- Postcode: 2084
Suburbs around Duffys Forest
	Ku-ring-gai Chase National Park
Ku-ring-gai Chase National Park	Duffys Forest	Terrey Hills
	Ku-ring-gai Chase National Park

Duffys Forest is a suburb of northern Sydney, in the state of New South Wales, Australia. Duffys Forest is 28 kilometres north of the Sydney central business district in the local government area of Northern Beaches Council. Duffys Forest is considered to be part of the Northern Beaches region and the Forest District.

== History ==
Duffys Forest is named after Patrick Duffy, who received a land grant there in 1857. He became a timber cutter and cleared a road through the bush to Cowan Creek, where he built a stone wharf for transporting timber. The wharf is still known as Duffys Wharf and the road is Duffys Track.

== Heritage listings ==
Duffys Forest has a number of heritage-listed sites, including:

- 13 Namba Road: Waratah Park

== Population ==
In the 2021 Census, there were 509 people in Duffys Forest. 70.5% of people were born in Australia and 86.2% of people only spoke English at home. The most common responses for religion were No Religion 43.4%, Catholic 23.4% and Anglican 18.1%.

== Landmarks ==
Waratah Park Earth Sanctuary (33.6761°S 151.1772°E) was a popular tourist attraction in Duffys Forest, famous as the film set of the popular television series Skippy the Bush Kangaroo. Much of the set and props are still there, although since being closed in August 2009 all of the animals including descendants of the kangaroos used in the series have now been removed.

The 'Duffys Forest Ecological Community' is an endangered ecological community of the Sydney basin.

== Education ==
Duffys Forest is home to one school:

AGBU Alexander Primary School
