= The Intruders (1969 film) =

- Film poster
- Directed by: Lee Robinson
- Screenplay by: Lee Robinson
- Story by: Ross Napier
- Produced by: Lee Robinson; Joy Cavill
- Starring: Ed Devereaux
- Cinematography: Peter Menzies; Ron & Valerie Taylor (underwater)
- Edited by: Don Saunders
- Music by: Eric Jupp
- Production company: Woomera Productions
- Distributed by: Regent Films (Australia); Children's Film Foundation (UK)
- Release date: 12 December 1969
- Running time: 100 mins (original version); 70 mins (UK version)
- Country: Australia
- Language: English

The Intruders (also known as Skippy and the Intruders) is a 1969 Australian film directed by Lee Robinson. It is a spin-off of the television series Skippy the Bush Kangaroo.

== Synopsis ==
A gang of criminals led by Meredith is looking for sunken treasure off Mallacoota, pretending to be diving for abalone. Sonny, son of Matt Hammond, the Chief Ranger of Waratah National Park, investigates with their family friend, Clancy. Sonny and Clancy are kidnapped. Skippy comes to the rescue. After a speedboat chase and a fight in the sand dunes, Meredith is captured.

== Cast ==
- Ed Devereaux as Matt Hammond
- Tony Bonner as Jerry King
- Ken James as Mark Hammond
- Garry Pankhurst as Sonny Hammond
- Liza Goddard as Clancy
- Ron Graham as Peter Yordan
- Jeanie Drynan as Margaret 'Meg' Curtis
- Kevin Miles as Meredith
- Jack Hume as Curtis
- Jeff Ashby as Graigoe
- George Assang as Sigigi
- John Unicomb as Bernie
- Mike Dawkins as Scott
- Robert Bruning as Lennox
- Harry Lawrence
- Reg Gorman as Boatman (uncredited)
- Skippy

== Production ==
Filming began in October 1968 using the same crew and locations as the TV series. Additional location shooting was done at Mallacoota in Victoria, some 470 km south of the fictional Waratah National Park (Ku-ring-gai Chase) and in Sydney.

== Release ==
The cinema release of the film was promoted with personal appearances from Skippy.

=== Critical ===
The Age called it "quite a pleasant adventure for the younger set" but Lee Robinson "slow paces the indoor talk which is too formal and deliberate for a telly-raised generation. In fact, some snipping with the scissors would do wonders here, even if it meant sacrificing the "A" feature length the producers aimed for."

Filmink thought it "made the cardinal error of barely using Skippy in the film."

=== Box office ===
The film failed to match the popularity of the TV series and was not a box office success. John McCallum later claimed they:

Got the money back on the film but we thought it would be a bigger success in the cinema. If they could see it for nothing at home, the Mums and Dads weren't too keen to take the kids and pay at the cinema. We sold it to the Children's Film Foundation in England and they did well with it. They cut it down to a 60-minute version and played in Saturday mornings in the cinemas.

In 1976 Robinson said the film had been sold to network television in the US but had not recouped its costs and was "unlikely to" although he felt the short version "was a very good film... it really goes crack along." Robinson put the financial failure down to the fact the series was still being made at the time.
