= Eric Jupp =

British-born Australian composer and conductor (1922–2003)

Eric Jupp OAM
- Born: 7 January 1922; Brighton, England
- Died: 2 January 2003 (aged 80) Launceston, Tasmania, Australia
- Occupations: Musician; composer; arranger; conductor

Eric Stanley Jupp (7 January 1922 – 2 January 2003) was a British-born musician, composer, arranger and conductor who gained wide popularity in Australia after settling there in the 1960s, hosting a long-running light music TV show and composing for film and TV. He is best remembered for his theme music to the TV series Skippy the Bush Kangaroo.

== Biography ==
Jupp was born in Brighton, England, in 1922 and began to study piano at seven. He left school and started his musical career at fourteen, playing in nightclubs. He joined the R.A.F. at the outbreak of World War II. When the war ended, he went to London, where he soon became a prominent member of several leading big bands, working as a pianist, composer and arranger.

Jupp worked as an arranger for both of Britain's top bandleaders of the period, Stanley Black and Ted Heath. Heath's all-star staff of arrangers included Jupp, John Dankworth, George Shearing and Wally Stott (later the musical director of The Goon Show). As pianist and arranger Jupp was also a long-serving member of the Oscar Rabin Band, one of Britain's most popular dance orchestras of that period.

In 1951 Jupp formed his own orchestra at the request of the BBC and began making regular radio broadcasts and also appeared in the Hammer Films TV series Bands on Parade. He began writing music for films in Britain, beginning with the crime drama The Secret Place (1957). Jupp first visited Australia in 1960 under short-term contract to the Australian Broadcasting Commission (ABC), and during his visit he arranged the music for the single "First Kiss" / "My Secret" (July 1960) by pop duo the Allen Brothers, which included Peter Allen.

Jupp returned to England later in the year but in 1961 he was invited to join the ABC as musical director of its light entertainment department, based in Sydney. Soon after taking up his new post he formed the Eric Jupp Orchestra and launched his popular and long-running weekly ABC-TV series, The Magic of Music, which was seen in 29 countries and ran from 1961 to 1974. The series featured mainly "orchestral pops" and light classical music, but it also included regular jazz segments featuring notable Australian performers such as Don Burrows and George Golla.

The success of the series led to a contract with EMI's Columbia label and a string of popular "Magic of Music" LPs that continued to the mid-1970s. The LPs (and the show) often featured vocalists Shirley McDonald (whom Jupp married in the 1960s) and Neil Williams. Around the same time in 1961, Jupp and his Orchestra performed on Dickie Pride's only studio album, Pride Without Prejudice.

Jupp soon made a name for himself as a leading composer for film and TV in Australia. Undoubtedly his best-remembered composition is the theme for the popular 1960s TV series Skippy the Bush Kangaroo. The long version (the B-side on the record) has lyrics written by Ted Roberts.

In early 1968 Jupp moved to Norfolk Island, commuting by air to the mainland for his TV, radio and film work.

Jupp was awarded the Medal of the Order of Australia in 1995 for service to music.

== Credits ==
Among his later film and television credits, Jupp was the music director for the 1971 Fauna Productions adventure series Barrier Reef. He composed music for the TV series Bailey's Bird (1977) and wrote the score for Michael Pate's 1979 film version of Colleen McCullough's first novel, Tim, starring the then unknown Mel Gibson. It was Jupp who persuaded McCullough to settle on Norfolk Island after she shot to fame with her second novel, The Thorn Birds.

His last major TV credit was the score for the early 1990s remake of Skippy. In his retirement, Jupp and his family moved to Launceston in Tasmania. He died there in January 2003, after several months' illness, survived by his third wife Anita, his two daughters Linda and Catherine, six grandchildren and seven great-grandchildren.

== Charting discography ==
=== Albums ===
List of albums, with selected chart positions
Title	Album details	Peak chart positions
Title	Album details	AUS
Eric Jupp Presents The Magic Of Music "Live" (with Shirley McDonald, Neil Williams & The Eric Jupp Orchestra)	Released: May 1975; Format: LP; Label:Columbia – SCXO-8025	45

== 45 rpm ==
Columbia Records 45-DB 3875: 1957 : 'Follow Me'-'Steady as a Rock' - Clyde Ray on vocal.
