= Ed Devereaux =

Australian actor, film director (1925–2003)

- Born: 27 August 1925
- Died: 17 December 2003 (aged 78); Hampstead, London, England
- Occupations: Actor, director, scriptwriter
- Years active: 1955–1998
- Known for: Skippy the Bush Kangaroo; The True Believers
- Spouses: Rene Champion (m. 1952; div. 1986) Julie Hopton (m. 1986)
- Children: 4

Edward Sidney Devereaux (27 August 1925 – 17 December 2003), better known professionally as Ed Devereaux, was an Australian actor, director, and scriptwriter who lived in the United Kingdom for many years. He was best known for playing the part of Matt Hammond the head ranger in the Australian television series Skippy the Bush Kangaroo. He was also involved in the series behind the scenes, Devereaux writing the script and directing the episode "The Veteran" (1969), for which he received much critical acclaim. Devereaux based the story of the episode "Double Trouble" on an idea conceived by his children, wrote the screenplay of "Summer Storm" and the script for "The Mine". He also played the part of Joe in the Australian 1966 film They’re a Weird Mob. The film was a local success.

== Biography ==
Devereaux had been a boy soprano, teenage soldier in the New Guinea campaign during the Second World War, cabbie, storeman and truck driver before moving to the UK in 1950.

Devereaux appeared as Mr. Gubbins in the 1963 British comedy film Ladies Who Do and in several Carry On films including Carry On Sergeant, Carry On Nurse, Carry On Regardless and Carry On Jack.

He also appeared as Thomas Macaulay in series five of The Onedin Line, as Lord Beaverbrook in both Edward & Mrs. Simpson and The Life and Times of David Lloyd George, and as Mac in the British comedy series Absolutely Fabulous and in The Professionals (episode "Runner") and The Sweeney ("Jackpot"). In 1964 he appeared in The Saint episode "The Loving Brothers". In 1970 he played the villain in The Persuaders! episode "Anyone Can Play".

Australian TV roles included the title role of Jack Meredith in My Brother Jack (ABC-TV, 1965), and George King in Kings (1983). He also received critical acclaim, including the AACTA Award for Best Lead Actor in a Television Drama, for his role as Australian Prime Minister Ben Chifley, in the ABC TV mini series The True Believers (1988).

== Personal life ==
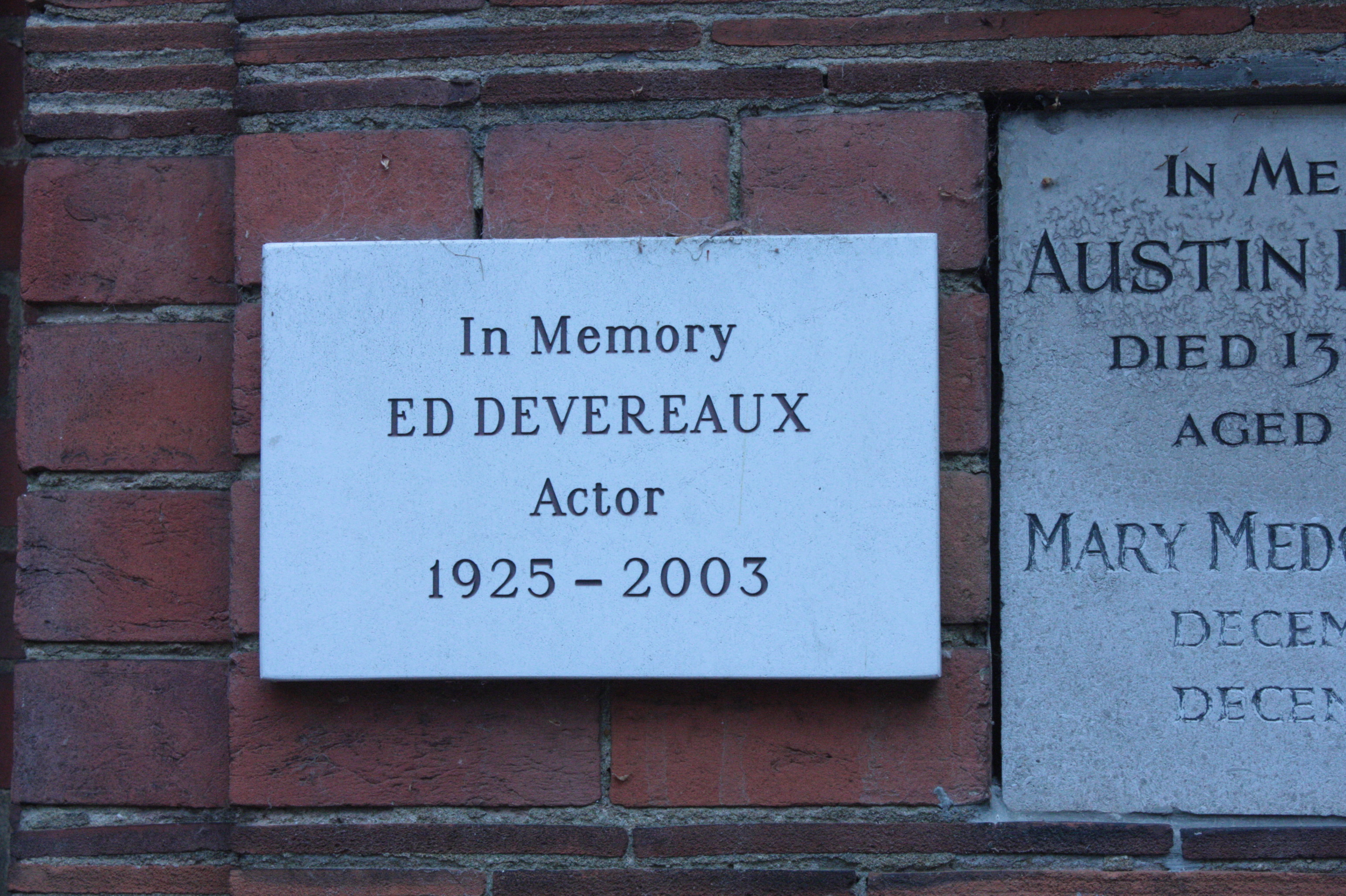
Memorial plaque to Ed Devereaux, London's Golders Green Crematorium

Devereaux's first wife was Rene (Irene) Champion. Together they had four children: John (b. 1954), Steven (b. 1955), Timothy (b. 1956) and Matthew (b. 1962). Champion wrote the song for the Skippy spin-off film The Intruders in 1969. The couple had experienced a marital separation sometime before their 1986 divorce, when Devereaux married his second wife, Julie.

== Death ==
Three months after he was diagnosed with cancer of the oesophagus, Devereaux died in his sleep of kidney failure at his Hampstead home on 17 December 2003 at the age of 78. He had insisted on being released from Royal Free Hospital to be at home with wife Julie. He was cremated at the Golders Green Crematorium, where his ashes remain.

== Selected filmography ==
- Little Red Monkey (1955) - American Sailor (uncredited)
- The Shiralee (1957) - Christy
- Carry On Sergeant (1958) - Sergeant Russell
- Floods of Fear (1958) - National Guard #2
- The Captain's Table (1959) - Brickwood
- Carry On Nurse (1959) - Alec Lawrence
- Bottoms Up (1960) - Policeman (uncredited)
- The Savage Innocents (1960) - Pilot
- There Was a Crooked Man (1960) - American Colonel
- Watch Your Stern (1960) - Cmdr. Phillips
- Man in the Moon (1960) - Storekeeper
- Carry On Regardless (1961) - Mr. Panting
- Very Important Person (1961) - Webber (uncredited)
- Carry On Cruising (1962) - Young Officer
- Mix Me a Person (1962) - Supt. Malley
- The Password Is Courage (1962) - Aussie
- The Wrong Arm of the Law (1963) - Bluey May
- Heavens Above! (1963) - Communications Officer (uncredited)
- Ladies Who Do (1963) - Mr. Gubbins
- Live It Up! (1963) - Herbert Martin
- Carry On Jack (1963) - Hook, Pirate
- The Bargee (1964) - Boat Man (uncredited)
- Never Put It in Writing (1964) - Pringle
- My Brother Jack (1965) - David Meredith
- Watch It (1966)
- They're a Weird Mob (1966) - Joe Kennedy
- Journey Out of Darkness (1967) - Jubbal
- The Intruders (1969) - Matt Hammond, Head Ranger
- Game, Set and Match - Currie
- Nickel Queen (1971) - Harry Phillips
- Anyone Can Play - Ryker
- Bless This House (1972) - Jim
- Fall of Eagles (1974) - Purtales
- Barry McKenzie Holds His Own (1974) - Sir Alec Ferguson
- The Sweeney (1975) - Harry Biggleswade
- To the Devil a Daughter (1976) - Reporter (uncredited)
- Pressure (1976) - Police Inspector
- Three Dangerous Ladies (1977) - Ferryman (segment "The Island")
- The Ghosts of Motley Hall (1978) - Marvin Dewey
- Money Movers (1978) - Dick Martin
- The Rock Pool (1979) - Ernie
- Robbery Under Arms (1985) - Ben
- Claudia (1985) - George
- Reunion at Fairborough (1985) - George Klass
- The Clean Machine (1988)
- Goldeneye: The Secret Life of Ian Fleming (1989) - Sir William Stephenson
- I Bought a Vampire Motorcycle (1990) - Landlord
- Buddy's Song (1991) - Bookie
