= Skippy the Bush Kangaroo =

Australian television series

- UK DVD cover
- Also known as: Skippy
- Genre: Adventure
- Created by: John McCallum; Lionel (Bob) Austin; Lee Robinson
- Written by: Ross Napier; Michael Wright
- Directed by: Eric Fullilove; Max Varnel
- Starring: Ed Devereaux; Garry Pankhurst; Ken James; Tony Bonner; Liza Goddard; Skippy (various kangaroos)
- Theme music composer: Eric Jupp
- Country of origin: Australia
- Original language: English
- No. of seasons: 3
- No. of episodes: 91 (list of episodes)

Production
- Executive producers: John McCallum; Lionel (Bob) Austin
- Producers: Joy Cavill; Lee Robinson; Dennis Hill
- Production locations: Ku-ring-gai Chase National Park; Duffys Forest (in section now known as Waratah Park)
- Running time: 25 minutes
- Production companies: Fauna Productions; Norfolk-International Films Limited

Original release
- Network: TCN Channel 9
- Release: 5 February 1968 – 4 May 1970

Skippy the Bush Kangaroo (known commonly as Skippy) is an Australian television series created by Australian actor John McCallum, Lionel (Bob) Austin, and Lee Robinson, produced from 1967 to 1969 (airing from 5 February 1968 to 4 May 1970) about the adventures of a boy and his highly intelligent pet kangaroo, and the various visitors to the fictional Waratah National Park, filmed in today's Waratah Park and adjoining portions of Ku-ring-gai Chase National Park near Sydney.

Three series comprising 91 30-minute episodes were produced. Additionally, a full-length film titled Skippy and the Intruders was released to theatres in 1969.

== Plot and setting ==
Skippy, the show's namesake star, is a female eastern grey kangaroo, that is befriended by 9-year-old Sonny Hammond, who with 16-year-old brother Mark are the children of widower Matt Hammond, the head ranger of Waratah National Park. The stories revolved around events in the park, including its animals, the dangers arising from natural hazards, and the actions of visitors (featuring numerous stars, predominately of the period in guesting roles). The boys' mother is said (in episode 48 "The Mine") to have died shortly after Sonny was born.

The small and unusually intelligent Skippy was not a pet, and the series often mentioned that Skippy lived in the park and was free to come and go as she pleased. Skippy was found in the bush as a baby by Sonny—an orphan, her mother having been killed by shooters. Once Skippy was old enough to look after herself, she was always understood to be able to go back to the bush, but a strong bond had been built up between Skippy and Sonny and the rest of the Hammond family. Skippy was a remarkable kangaroo. Capable of near-human thought and reasoning, she could understand everyone, open doors, carry things in her pouch, cross streams on narrow logs, foil villains, rescue hapless bushwalkers, untie ropes, collect the mail, and even operate the radio. In one episode, she plays drums in a band; in another, she places a bet - and wins - on a horse at Randwick Racecourse.

Sharing the ranger headquarters residence was the helicopter pilot, Flight Ranger Jerry King, aged in his mid-20s. Later, several female characters were introduced to the series, including Dr. Anna Steiner, a research scientist working in the park, and schoolgirl Clancy Merrick, the teenaged daughter of another park ranger who boards with the Hammonds. Members of the Aboriginal Theatre from Yirrkala in Arnhem Land in the Northern Territory made guest appearances in three episodes.

The series was often characterised as an Australian or kangaroo version of Flipper or Lassie.

== Cast ==
- Ed Devereaux as Matt Hammond, head ranger of Waratah National Park
- Garry Pankhurst as Sonny Hammond, Matt's younger son
- Ken James as Mark Hammond, Matt's elder son
- Tony Bonner as Jerry King (episodes 1-78), flight ranger (helicopter pilot)
- Liza Goddard as Clarissa "Clancy" Merrick (episodes 6, 9-75) was the teenaged daughter of a ranger stationed at another section of the park. When her father is transferred to a park in northern New South Wales, Matt invites Clancy to stay with the Hammond family so that her music studies are not disrupted by the move north. She leaves the series when her character is awarded a musical scholarship to study in London.
- John Warwick as Sir Adrian Gillespie, head of NSW National Parks Board
- Elke Neidhardt as Anna Steiner, a German doctor and playing a support role only in season one
- Morgan Brain as Sgt. Bernard Gillies
- Skippy was played by at least nine different kangaroos

== Guest artists ==
The series featured numerous well known stars (primarily of the era), who featured in guest cameos:

- Frank Thring, actor and executive
- Chips Rafferty, actor
- John Laws, radio broadcaster
- Jack Thompson, actor
- Barry Crocker, actor, singer and variety entertainer
- Maggie Dence, actress and comedienne
- Michael Caton, actor
- Ross Higgins, actor and comedian
- Max Cullen, actor
- Harold Hopkins, actor
- Tom Oliver, actor
- Wendy Blacklock, actress, and comedienne

== Episodes ==
Three series were made with a total of 91 episodes, and production was wound up in September 1969. Producers never intended to make more, partly because 91 episodes were considered enough, and partly because the child actor who played Sonny, Garry Pankhurst, was growing up.

== Production ==
The Skippy TV series was produced by Fauna Productions. During 1963, British film director Michael Powell had visited Australia to preproduce his film, They're A Weird Mob. There, he met actor and theatre businessman John McCallum and legal expert Bob Austin, who used their local knowledge to find financing from Australian backers. The film did well, and McCallum and Austin together with veteran Australian producer Lee Robinson went on to set up Fauna Productions.

The business made its reputation with Skippy, produced in association with Frank Packer's TCN Channel 9 Sydney. Fauna Productions went on to produce the TV series Barrier Reef and Boney, as well as the feature film Nickel Queen. Fauna Productions is still in business, now being run by two sons of the founders, Philip Austin and Nick McCallum. It holds copyright over the original Skippy TV series, while the Nine Network holds the trademark.

Most episodes were directed by Max Varnel or Eric Fullilove, with scripts written by Australian writers. Producer Lee Robinson said, "Each story has the underlying thought, which is the preservation of wildlife".

Accomplished musician, band-leader, and composer Eric Jupp was responsible for the theme and incidental music for Skippy. "It took me a few days to write the Skippy theme", said Jupp. 'I'd already written three or four versions and then rejected them. But the effort has proved worthwhile because about 30,000 records of the theme have been sold in Australia alone.'.

=== Location filming ===
The series was shot in northern Sydney, on then undeveloped Crown land west of Namba Road now known as Waratah Park. Permission to film and build structures on the site was given by Warringah Council. Also necessary was the cooperation of the newly created NSW National Parks & Wildlife Service, under government minister Tom Lewis, and the Ku-ring-gai Chase Trust to allow access to a further 202 hectares (500 acres) within the adjacent Ku-ring-gai Chase National Park. Following preparatory work, filming commenced in May 1967.

The ranger headquarters and residence was purpose-built for the series and used for both exterior and interior scenes. Power and water supply had to be connected and roads constructed, together with a helipad and helicopter-servicing area. Other national parks were also used for filming, as well as the streets and beaches of Sydney and surrounding districts. "The Australian bush provided an excellent scenic backdrop, which was much appreciated by local and overseas viewers alike."

=== Animal actors ===
Between 9 and 15 kangaroos were used for each show. The apparent manual dexterity was often achieved by using separate arms in the hands of human operators. Skippy's trademark "tchk tchk tchk" noise was entirely fictional. Kangaroos make no such sounds, but some sort of sound was needed for the series, and someone came up with the idea of clicking tongues to make the sound. To this day, many people believe that kangaroos make "tchk tchk" noises. To make Skippy move her mouth, supposedly creating the vocalisations, production staff gave the kangaroos chocolate, chewing gum, or grass, and in some cases, an elastic band around the lower jaw.

A menagerie of other animals and birds was used for the show, including dingoes, possums, emus, galahs, and koalas, all trained and managed by Scotty Denholm, a former NSW police-dog trainer. In theory, there was only one Skippy, but in reality, many stand-ins were used. "Like people, some kangaroos are brighter than others", said producer Dennis Hill. Nonetheless, limits exist as to what one can get a kangaroo to do. Often, the actors could be noticed patting the kangaroo to get her to move, or holding her to prevent her moving. Kangaroo-paw bottle openers, of a type that could be purchased at any souvenir shop, were used for close-up scenes of Skippy opening doors or picking up objects. Also, a stuffed kangaroo from a taxidermist was used for scenes from behind, or when Skippy was required to jump into a confined space such as the helicopter.

== Feature film ==
Filming of the Skippy movie commenced in October 1968. Entitled The Intruders or Skippy and the Intruders, the movie was largely filmed on the Waratah Park set, as well as near the south coast town of Mallacoota. "Basically a feature-length episode, the movie was seen as a good, rollicking adventure yarn and was well-received by Skippy fans."

== Popularity and awards ==
Skippy was the first Australian series to be heavily merchandised. The Skippy Club boasted over 67,000 members. In Japan, short 8mm colour films were on sale. In Australia and many overseas countries, one could buy Skippy pyjamas, ice-creams, toys, jewellery, soap, comics, jelly-beans, rulers, pencils, puzzles, toothpaste, shampoo, T-shirts, towels, and soft drinks. The Commercial Banking Company had Skippy moneyboxes, the contents of which could be banked with the details entered into a Skippy passbook. There were LP and EP records, an adventure story narrated by John McCallum, and several books, and in 2009, one could still buy Skippy Corn Flakes. The popularity of Skippy was summed up by Fauna's marketing and merchandising manager, Kevin Gleeson: 'Skippy is clean, non-violent fun with no sex. It's wholesome, family-type entertainment. . .most importantly, any necessary violence is innocuous and insignificant, with the old Skippy coming to the rescue at the end of each episode'.

Skippy won a number of awards:

- A 1968 Logie Special Award for Best Export Production and a Logie for Michael Wright, writer of episode four, "The Poachers"
- A 1968 Penguin Award for Best Live Show
- A 1969 Charlie Award for Best Promotion and Contribution to the Australian entertainment industry.

All three series of Skippy plus The Intruders have been released on DVD. The series sold around the world, reportedly shown in 128 countries. It is still being shown in some countries, some 51 years after it was made. Lee Robinson says the series only recovered its costs in 1976.

== Broadcast history ==
=== Domestic ===
The show was produced for global distribution and filmed in colour. It premiered outside of Australia. The domestic premiere in Sydney (on TCN-9) and Melbourne (GTV-9) was Monday evening, 5 February 1968.

The Nine Network readily repeated the series several times after Australian television switched to colour transmission in 1975. In 2009, the Nine Network began to rerun the series in a graveyard slot in the early hours of the morning. In 2013, 9Gem started showing Skippy at 6:30 am.

=== International ===
The Australian series was one of the most popular exported television programs. Skippy was broadcast in all Commonwealth countries, including in Canada, where it was adapted in Quebec for the Standard French market as Skippy le kangourou.

Making its debut in the UK on 8 October 1967 on ATV (four months before it was released in its native Australia), Skippy rivalled Doctor Who and The Avengers in terms of popularity in Britain’s TV Comic.

Skippy was broadcast in Mexico, where it was dubbed into Spanish and known as Skippy el canguro, and has been seen in most Spanish-speaking countries, including Cuba and Spain, where it became very popular. In Latin America, the show was broadcast on free TV in the 1970s, and on pay TV (cable, satellite and IPTV) vía Sundance Channel (Channel 520 of DIRECTV).

In the Netherlands, Skippy was first broadcast between 1969 and 1972. In Germany, it was known as Skippy, das Buschkänguruh, while in Italy, it was known as Skyppy il canguro and broadcast by RAI Television. The show was popular in Scandinavia, and in Norway, a chain of shopping centres were named in honour of the programme. The series crossed the Iron Curtain and was broadcast in Czechoslovakia and the Soviet Union during the 1970s and 1980s. The series was also widely distributed in Ghana, where it aired weekly on the GBC. The series was also broadcast in Iran. Skippy was syndicated in the United States during the late 1960s; it was frequently scheduled on weekends, with other children's programmes.

== The Adventures of Skippy ==
The series was revived in 1992 as the short-lived The Adventures of Skippy. This revival series focused on the now-adult Sonny Hammond (played by Andrew Clarke) – having followed in his father's footsteps by becoming a ranger at a wildlife park – who now had his own family and a pet kangaroo named Skippy.

In the U.S., this version also aired on Animal Planet in 1997, and also on TBN's Smile of a Child children's network until 2019.

A series of 39 episodes has been released on DVD by Umbrella Entertainment.

== Later history ==
In 1998, an animated spin-off series was produced, known as Skippy: Adventures in Bushtown. It featured a version of Skippy, portrayed as a male, anthropomorphic kangaroo, working as a park ranger.

In 1999, Skippy starred in advertisements for the chocolate confectionery Rolo Cookies.

In September 2008, actor Tony Bonner sued the production company seeking residuals from merchandising and DVD sales from the series.

On 17 September 2009, a documentary Skippy: Australia's First Superstar was broadcast on the ABC in Australia and the BBC in the UK. The documentary was produced by Western Australian-based documentary production company Electric Pictures.

== In popular culture ==
The original series was parodied in a recurring sketch as part of the British comedy series Goodness Gracious Me under the title "Skipinder, the Punjabi Kangaroo": the parody redubbed scenes from the original Skippy. The show was also parodied in the 1989–1992 Australian sketch comedy TV show, Fast Forward.

== Home media ==
Title	Format	Ep #	Discs	Date/Region	Special features	Distributors
The Adventures of Skippy	DVD	39	3	30 December 2003 1 (United States)	None	Platinum Disc Corporation
Skippy the Bush Kangaroo	DVD	8	1	2004 2 (Netherlands & Belgium)	None	Indies Home Entertainment
The Adventures of Skippy: The Vandals	DVD	4	1	2005 0 (United States)	None	Digiview Entertainment
Skippy: The Bush Kangaroo: The Complete First Season	DVD	39	7	1 October 2005 0 (Australia)	TV Special Cast Interviews Photo Gallery Commercial	Umbrella Entertainment
Skippy: The Bush Kangaroo: The Complete First Season	DVD	39	5	10 July 2006 2 (United Kingdom)	None	Fabulous Films
The Complete Skippy: The Bush Kangaroo	DVD	91	14	1 June 2011 4 (Australia)	None	Umbrella Entertainment
Skippy and The Intruders	DVD	Film	01	1 April 2015 4 (Australia)	None	Umbrella Entertainment
Skippy: Australia's First Superstar	DVD	Film	01	1 February 2017 4 (Australia)	Bonus Scenes with Directors Commentary The Academics' View The Crews' View Photo Gallery	Umbrella Entertainment
The Adventures Of Skippy (Complete Series)	DVD	39	5	4 April 2018	None	Umbrella Entertainment
