= Garry Pankhurst =

Child star of iconic Australian TV series

- Born: October 1957 (age 69); Australia
- Occupations: Actor, exporter
- Years active: 1966–1969
- Spouse: Debra Pankhurst
- Children: 2

Garry Pankhurst (born October 1957) is an Australian former child actor and exporter, best known for his role as Sonny Hammond in the 1960s Australian children's television series Skippy. He left the acting profession and went into hotel and restaurant management. He later started a career in meat export to Malaysia which included kangaroo meat, a situation he referred to as "Sonny's revenge".
