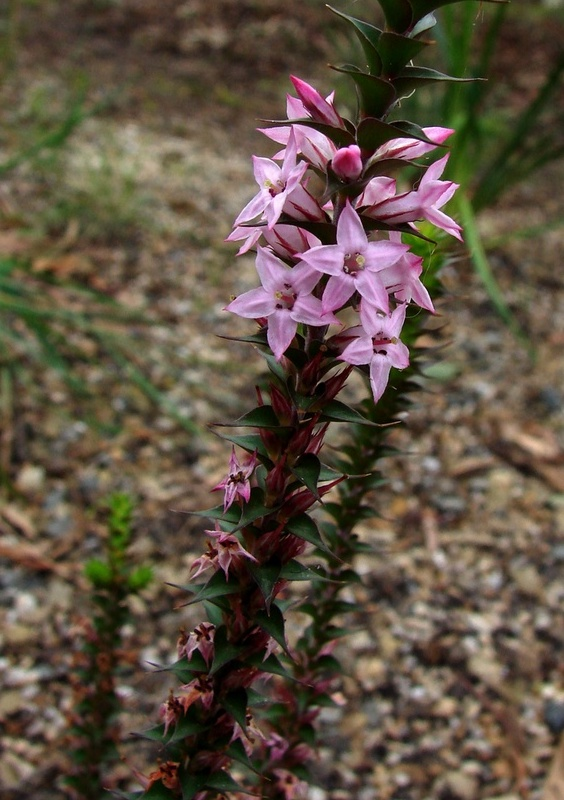

Scientific classification
- Kingdom: Plantae
- Clade: Tracheophytes
- Clade: Angiosperms
- Clade: Eudicots
- Clade: Asterids
- Order: Ericales
- Family: Ericaceae
- Genus: Epacris
- Species: E. purpurascens

Binomial name
- Epacris purpurascens Banks ex Sims

Synonyms
- Epacris purpurascens var. rubra Lodd., G.Lodd. & W.Lodd.; Lysinema purpurascens (Sims) Courtois; Lysinema purpurascens (Sims) Courtois var. purpurascens

= Epacris purpurascens =

Species of flowering plant

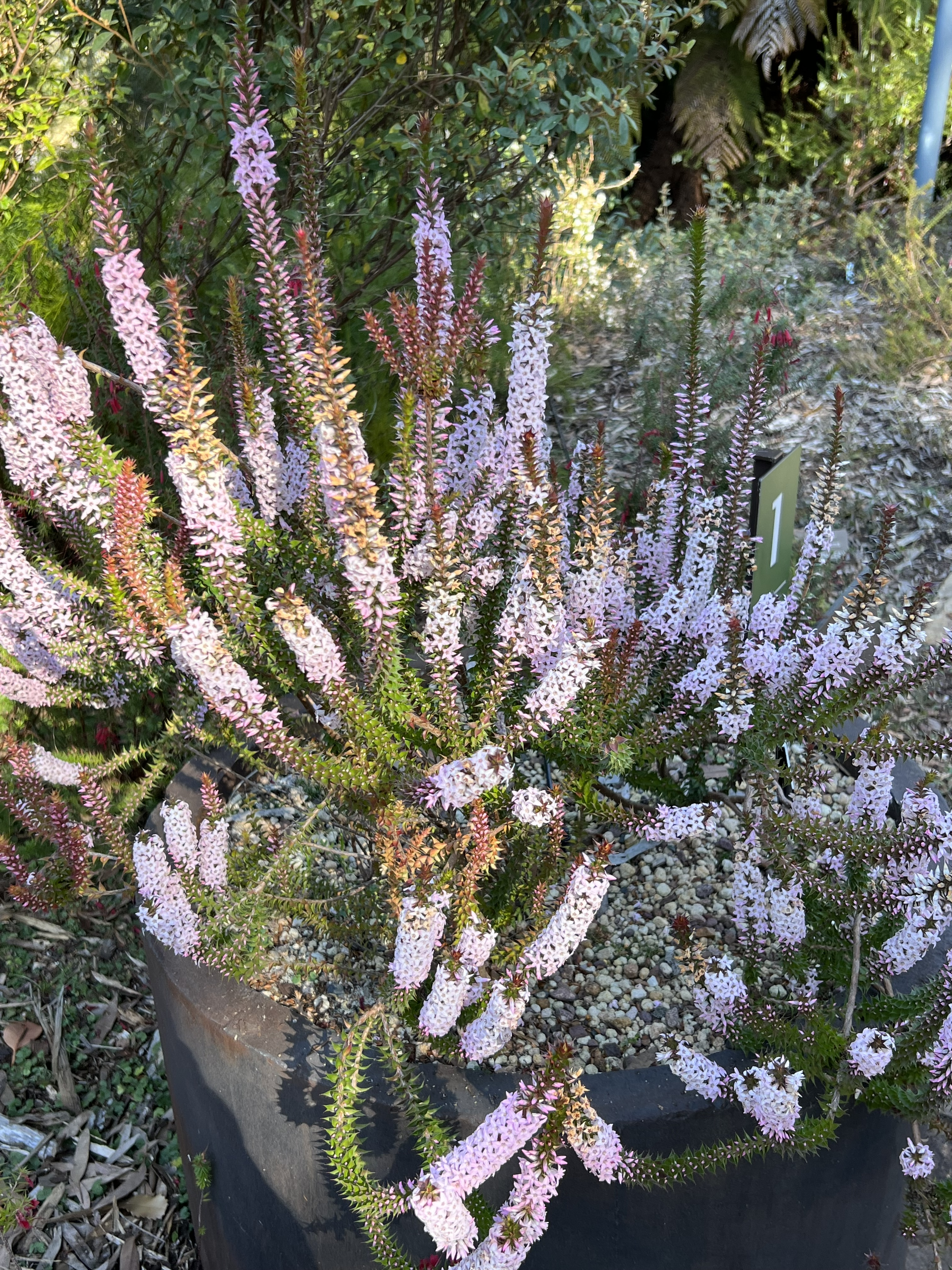
Epacris purpurascens var. purpurascens

Epacris purpurascens is a species of flowering plant in the heath family Ericaceae and is endemic to eastern New South Wales. It is an erect shrub with egg-shaped or heart-shaped, sharply-pointed leaves and white or pink, tube-shaped flowers.

== Description ==
Epacris purpurascens is an erect shrub that typically grows to a height of up to 0.5–1.5 m (1 ft 8 in – 4 ft 11 in), its stems with prominent leaf scars and the branchlets shaggy-hairy. The leaves are pressed against the stem near their bases, and are egg-shaped or heart-shaped, 7–21 mm (0.28–0.83 in) long and 4.4–9 mm (0.17–0.35 in) wide on a petiole 0.8–1.5 mm (0.031–0.059 in) long. The leaves are concave and taper to a sharp, bristly point. The flowers are arranged along the branches, each flower on a pedicel about 1–2 mm (0.039–0.079 in) long. The sepals are 4.3–6.5 mm (0.17–0.26 in) long, the petals white or pink, and joined at the base, forming a bell-shaped tube 4.3–7.7 mm (0.17–0.30 in) long with lobes 3.6–5 mm (0.14–0.20 in) long.

== Taxonomy and naming ==
Epacris purpurascens was first formally described in 1809 by John Sims in Curtis's Botanical Magazine from an unpublished description by Joseph Banks. The specific epithet (purpurascens) means "becoming purple".

In 1824, Joachim Conrad Loddiges, George Loddiges and William Loddiges described two varieties of E. purpurescens and in 1901 Joseph Maiden and Ernst Betche reduced Epacris onosmiflora A.Cunn. to E. purpurascens var. onosmiflora. The names of the following varieties are accepted by the Australian Plant Census:

- Epacris purpurascens var. onosmiflora (A.Cunn.) Maiden & Betche has a petal tube 6.2–7.7 mm (0.24–0.30 in) long and longer than the sepals. It mainly flowers in October and November.
- Epacris purpurascens Banks ex Sims var. purpurascens has a petal tube 4.3–6.0 mm (0.17–0.24 in) long and up to the length of the sepals. It flowers from July to September.

== Distribution and habitat ==
This epacris grows in forest and scrub near creeks and swamps in eastern New South Wales. The variety onosmiflora is restricted to the Blue Mountains and var. purpurascens grows on coastal plateaus in the Sydney and Gosford districts.
