= Michael Bialoguski =

Polish-Australian medical practitioner, musician and intelligence agent (1917-1984)

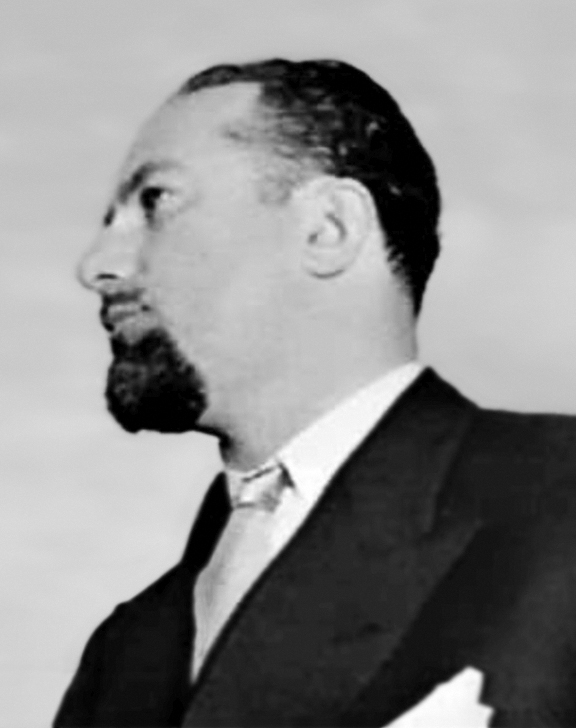
Dr. Michael Bialoguski at the Petrov Royal Commission, Darlinghurst, 08/10/1954

Michael Bialoguski (19 March 1917 – 29 July 1984) was a Polish-Australian medical practitioner, musician and intelligence agent, who played a significant part in the 1954 Petrov Affair.

== Biography ==
Michael Bialoguski was born to Polish Jewish parents in 1917 in Kiev, then part of the Russian Empire and now the capital of Ukraine. When he was three years old, Bolshevik forces were on the point of shooting him and his entire family, when his father bribed them with his gold watch; they were forced to flee immediately, and made their way to Wilno, Poland (now Vilnius, Lithuania). He attended school there, studied violin at the Vilnius Conservatorium, receiving a diploma in 1935, and commenced a course in medicine at the Stefan Batory University. He had an early short-lived marriage. He was jailed by the invading Soviet forces in 1939. It was at this time that he had his first experience of conducting an orchestra, that of a musical comedy troupe.

In 1941, he travelled across the Soviet Union by train to Vladivostok, on to Japan, departing ostensibly for Curaçao (then part of the Netherlands Antilles in the Caribbean) but using forged papers to come instead to Sydney, Australia, where he worked as a violinist and music arranger. He joined the Australian Army, served as an orderly at an army hospital, and was discharged to continue his medical studies at the University of Sydney. He married again in 1943, was naturalised in 1947, the same year in which he qualified as a doctor, and he practised as a general practitioner from 1948, initially in Thirroul and later in Macquarie Street, Sydney.

== The Petrov Affair ==
Around 1945, Bialoguski had made himself known to the Commonwealth Investigation Service, the forerunner of the Australian Security Intelligence Organisation (ASIO), and was recruited to gather information from Russian immigrants. Bob Wake, who ran the Brisbane office of the CIS, was one of the first CIS officers to work with Bialoguski. When Wake became an ASIO director in Sydney he paid Bialoguski about five pounds a week for information. Wake's story can be found in the non-fiction work No Ribbons or Medals: the story of an Australian counter espionage officer. In 1951 in Sydney he met Vladimir Petrov, who had recently arrived from the Soviet Union to take up his post as third secretary at the Soviet Embassy in Canberra. They cultivated each other's friendship, spending much time together, drinking and visiting prostitutes in Kings Cross. Bialoguski played a double game for some time, appearing to be spying on Petrov's behalf while simultaneously spying on Petrov himself for ASIO. He was able to confirm ASIO's suspicions that Petrov was spying for the KGB in Australia. After the death of Joseph Stalin in 1953 and the execution of Lavrentiy Beria, Bialoguski and Ron Richards were able to persuade Petrov that it was not safe for him to return. In return for a promise of safety and a substantial amount of cash, Petrov defected in April 1954. His wife Evdokia was initially unaware he had taken this action; although she was recalled, she did not want to leave her husband, but knew that to remain in Australia against her government's wishes would have placed her sister Tamara in danger back home. In the end, amid extraordinary scenes at Sydney and Darwin airports, she too defected. Bialoguski was a witness for ASIO at the subsequent Royal Commission on Espionage, which commenced the following month. The Leader of the Opposition, Dr. Herbert Vere Evatt, LLD, who appeared at the Royal Commission to defend his staff members whose names had been dragged into the affair, characterised the whole episode as "The Petrov-Bialoguski Affair".

Bialoguski divorced his second wife that year. He published a book The Petrov Story in 1955. Extracts were published in some newspapers, but rival newspapers published his ex-wife's alternative account of his life and character, which painted him in a rather negative light. He sued for libel and eventually won his case in 1961. In the meantime, the book was the basis of an American television documentary in 1956. But his divorce ate up all his earnings, and in 1957 he spent another short period in jail. He married his third wife in 1957. They had three children, two daughters and one son.

== Later musical activities ==
Bialoguski had maintained his passion for music, and sought conducting lessons from Sir Eugene Goossens, then based in Sydney, but was rebuffed. Earlier, in 1949, Goossens had invited him to accept a position as a violinist in the Sydney Symphony Orchestra, of which he was the chief conductor. In 1964 Bialoguski and his wife moved permanently to England. Although continuing to make his living from medicine, he still strove to become a conductor, but was met with continual knockbacks. Sir Adrian Boult suggested he should stay with medicine. He applied for entry to the conducting courses at the Royal Academy of Music and Royal College of Music, but was rejected on account of his age. He did some private conducting training with Ernest Read in London. He was accepted by the Accademia Musicale Chigiana in Siena, Italy, where he obtained his Masters Diploma in 1967 under the guidance of Franco Ferrara. Then, unable to secure any regular conducting engagements back in the UK, he spent his life savings on hiring the New Philharmonia Orchestra for a single concert at the Royal Albert Hall on 29 April 1969, which he conducted, to lukewarm reviews. The concert included Beethoven's 4th Symphony and Chopin's Piano Concerto No. 2 with the pianist Fou Ts'ong as soloist.

He also formed the Commonwealth Philharmonic Orchestra, which he conducted at the Albert Hall and in Westminster Abbey. He did further conducting in England and West Germany. He also recorded two symphonies with the New Philharmonia – Bohuslav Martinů's 6th Symphony and Jan Václav Voříšek's Symphony in D – which were released on LP by Unicorn Records.

He married Nonie Piper, a model who appeared in the film Bitter Springs (1950).

Michael Bialoguski died in Surrey in 1984, aged 67. He was survived by his third wife and three children.

He was played by Slawomir Wabik in the 1987 TV mini-series The Petrov Affair and by Gary Deirmendjian in the 2010 television movie I, Spry.

He appears in Andrew Croome's historical novel about the Petrov Affair, Document Z (2009).
