= Into the Straight =

1949 film by T.O. McCreadie

- Directed by: T. O. McCreadie
- Written by: Zelma Roberts
- Produced by: T. O. McCreadie; Alec McCreadie (executive)
- Starring: Charles Tingwell; Muriel Steinbeck
- Cinematography: Harry Malcolm
- Edited by: Alex Ezard; Jack Gardiner
- Music by: Wilbur Sampson
- Production company: Embassy Pictures
- Distributed by: Universal Pictures
- Release date: 15 July 1949
- Running time: 82 minutes
- Country: Australia
- Language: English

Into the Straight is a 1949 Australian horse racing melodrama directed by T. O. McCreadie. It used many cast and crew from their first effort, Always Another Dawn.

== Plot ==
The Curzons, an Australian horse racing family, are visited by an English horse trainer, Hugh Duncan, and his playboy son, Paul. Both men fall for June Curzon. However, after she is crippled in an accident Paul loses interest, and she realises she loves Hugh.

With Hugh's encouragement, June writes a piano concerto and learns to walk again. Her brother, the weak Sam Curzon, steals money from his father to pay gambling debts and allows Paul to take the blame. However, a horse secretly trained by Paul wins the Melbourne Cup.

== Cast ==
- James Workman as Hugh Duncan
- Charles Tingwell as Sam Curzon
- Margo Lee as Zara Marlowe
- Muriel Steinbeck as Mrs Laura Curzon
- Nonnie Peifer as June Curzon
- Shirley Hall as Bunty
- George Randall as W.J. Curzon
- Alan White as Paul Duncan
- Norton Howarth

== Production ==
The film was made by the same team that had made Always Another Dawn.

Charles Tingwell also worked as a trainee to Alex Ezard. Filmink later wrote "Steinbeck was the biggest name in the cast at the time, but it isn’t much of a role… and in hindsight that was a mistake. The filmmakers would have been better off building the movie around Steinbeck – either have her play the role of her daughter... or made her character the center of the action. But then, Australian cinema has traditionally demonstrated a poor understanding how best to exploit potential stars."

Star James Workman - who later became a radio writer - recalled "The McCreadies were very nice people but they were convinced that they knew all the answers. .. They ran cinemas so they thought they knew what people wanted so they shoved it all into the one film, no explanations no nothing.”

Shooting began in June 1948, on location in Scone, New South Wales, and at the studio of Commonwealth Film Laboratories in Sydney. The Victoria Racing Club allowed a re-creation of the Melbourne Cup to be shot at Flemington Racecourse and scenes were also filmed at Randwick Racecourse. Several jockeys made cameos in the film, including Jack Purtell and George Moore.

The film featured a piano concerto which took up several minutes of screen time.

== Reception ==
The film was well received in Perth but only had a short run in Sydney and Melbourne.

=== Critical ===
The Sun Herald said the film "compares not unfavourably with many of the B-grade quickies successfully produced as cheap supporting films by Monogram and Pine-Thomas" and declared it "sticks pretty firmly to the story line and does not allow itself to be side-tracked and unbalanced by all sorts of amateurish irrelevancies" although "there is a very long patch in the middle where the producers seem to forget that they are making a racing film."

The Newcastle Sun wrote "the script is faulty, but the main trouble is that too many thincs have been attempted. A pleasing feature, however, is the photography."

The Bulletin declared, "In the parlance of that sport [horse racing], it could be said that while it would need a pretty hefty “sting” to make it a winner, it does, atHhe same time, run a fairly honest race under a big handicap and gives supporters a middling-fair run for their money."

Variety called it "unsuited for the US" but felt it "might find a spot or two in the British provinces... Stud farm scenes are fine. Cast is adequate."

Filmink called it "an entirely decent, honest melodrama... the sort of bread and butter picture that they routinely made in Hollywood and Britain" which "benefits from Tom McCreadie’s excellent direction, strong location work and an excellent cast. Its main problem, as with Always Another Dawn, was the script. However, while the McCreadies’ first film suffered from not having enough story, Into the Straight has far too much."

== See also ==
- List of films about horses
- List of films about horse racing
