= Zelma Roberts =

New Zealand screenwriter (1915–1988)

Zelma Oakley Roberts (née Mason, 24 September 1915 – 9 February 1988) was a New Zealand-born writer who wrote several screenplays for T.O. McCreadie in the late 1940s.

== Biography ==
Born in Christchurch on 24 September 1915, Roberts was the daughter of William James Mason and his wife Eva Mason (née Oakley). She studied at Victoria University College in Wellington, graduating Master of Arts in 1936.

After her husband Wilfred died in the war while serving in the New Zealand 2nd Division, she turned to writing. Her novel Always Another Dawn was bought by McCreadie and filmed in 1948.

Roberts moved to Paris where she wrote and produced documentaries for UNESCO.

In 1968, Roberts remarried Herbert Dineley in Scotland. She died in Sydney, New South Wales, Australia, on 9 February 1988, and her ashes were buried at Eastern Suburbs Memorial Park, Matraville.

== Writings ==
- The Black Spider (1945) – novel
- The Corpse Wore Wax (1947) – novel
- Always Another Dawn (1948) – novel
- Always Another Dawn (1948) – screenplay
- Into the Straight (1949) – screenplay
- The Search for Power (1954) – radio script
