= The Desert Rats (film) =

1953 film by Robert Wise

- Theatrical release poster
- Directed by: Robert Wise
- Written by: Richard Murphy
- Produced by: Robert L. Jacks
- Starring: Richard Burton; James Mason; Robert Newton; Robert Douglas; Torin Thatcher; Chips Rafferty; Charles Tingwell; Charles Davis; Ben Wright
- Cinematography: Lucien Ballard
- Edited by: Barbara McLean
- Music by: Leigh Harline
- Distributed by: 20th Century Fox
- Release date: 20 May 1953 (USA)
- Running time: 88 min.
- Country: United States
- Language: English
- Budget: $1,320,000
- Box office: $1.1 million (US rentals)

The Desert Rats is a 1953 American black-and-white war film from 20th Century Fox, produced by Robert L. Jacks, directed by Robert Wise, starring Richard Burton, James Mason, and Robert Newton. The film's storyline concerns the Siege of Tobruk in 1941 North Africa during World War II.

== Plot ==
German field marshal Erwin Rommel and his Afrika Korps have driven the British Army back toward Egypt and the vital Suez Canal. Standing in Rommel's way is Tobruk, a constant threat to his supply lines. The 9th Australian Division are charged with holding the port. The defending Allied general chooses British Captain MacRoberts to take command of newly arrived, untried Australian troops. The no-nonsense MacRoberts, disliked by the undisciplined Australians, is surprised to see in their ranks his former schoolmaster, Tom Bartlett, an alcoholic dismissed from his teaching job for drunkenness. MacRoberts offers to transfer him to a safer billet, but Bartlett refuses. The troops are sent directly into the front lines, where they dig in and prepare for Rommel's assault. Under cover of a sandstorm, Rommel's tanks and infantry attack where the Allied general predicted and head directly at MacRoberts' men. The Germans are beaten back. As a result, MacRoberts is made lieutenant colonel and battalion commander.

It is later decided to send out small commando raids every night, exacting a toll on German positions. But during a successful raid on a German ammunition dump, MacRoberts is wounded and captured. While being treated by a German doctor, he encounters Rommel, who has been shot by a strafing Spitfire. Although he is respectful, MacRoberts points out to the field marshal that Tobruk is a thorn in his side. Rommel, amused by his brashness, orders he be treated well. Later, MacRoberts escapes and makes his way back to Tobruk.

The siege goes on for months, and MacRoberts fears his men are becoming weary and will need to be relieved. After constant attacks and shelling by the Germans, he believes they can take no more. Surprisingly, the self-admitted coward, Bartlett, begs him to hang on. To MacRoberts' surprise, the rest of his men refuse to abandon their positions. Eventually, the Australians hear bagpipes announcing the arrival of a relief column. After a hard-fought 242 days, the Allies have retained Tobruk.

== Cast ==
- Richard Burton as Captain "Tammy" MacRoberts
- James Mason as Field Marshal Erwin Rommel
- Robert Newton as Tom Bartlett
- Robert Douglas as the General
- Torin Thatcher as Colonel Barney White
- Chips Rafferty as Sergeant "Blue" Smith
- Charles "Bud" Tingwell as Lieutenant Harry Carstairs (as Charles Tingwell)
- Charles Davis as Pete
- Ben Wright as Mick
- Michael Pate as Captain Currie (uncredited)
- John Alderson as Australian Corporal (uncredited)

== History ==
The film is based on the Australian 9th Division, who were charged with the defence of Tobruk under the command of General Leslie Morshead. Hoping to survive against overwhelming odds for two months, the garrison held off the best of Rommel's Afrika Korps for over eight months. Morshead was a distinguished Australian citizen-soldier, but is depicted in the film as the anonymous "General" and played by English actor Robert Douglas.

== Production ==
=== Development ===
The film was a quasi-sequel to The Desert Fox: The Story of Rommel (1951), which had been successful critically and commercially, particularly in England. It was, reportedly, partly made to portray a less likeable General Rommel, after criticism that film had been too friendly to the Germans. Rommel is again played by James Mason, but this time he usually speaks in German and is not sympathetic. The title The Desert Rats was selected to refer to the earlier title The Desert Fox. Mason wore Rommel's real scarf in the film, which had been given to him by the general's widow.

In October 1951 Fox announced that Robert L. Jacks would produce and Sam Fuller, who saw active duty in World War II and who had just made Fixed Bayonets for Fox, would direct. The film was based on a book, The Siege of Tobruk by Gregory Rogers, and filming was to start in January 1952. Zanuck said research revealed a few Americans were involved in the siege but none appeared in the final film.

Filming was delayed and Fuller dropped out to work on other films. In July 1952 Fox announced that filming would take place in September and the three leads would be played by Michael Rennie, Robert Newton and James Robertson Justice. (Rennie and Newton had just made Les Misérables together).

The script was written by an American, Richard Murphy, who was familiar with Australian servicemen from his time being a liaison officer with the Ninth Division in New Guinea, after its withdrawal from the Middle East in 1942.

Filming was pushed back further. In October Fox replaced Rennie with Richard Burton, who had just appeared in My Cousin Rachel for the studio and signed a contract with Fox to make one film a year for ten years. (Instead, as he had done in The Desert Fox several years earlier, Rennie delivered an uncredited voiceover.) The same month Robert Wise was assigned to direct.

Several genuine Australian actors were cast, including Chips Rafferty, Charles Tingwell, Michael Pate and John O'Malley. Tingwell and Rafferty had just made Kangaroo (1952) for Fox in Australia and were flown to Hollywood. Rafferty had also appeared in an Australian film based on the battle The Rats of Tobruk (1944).

Richard Boone, who had just made Kangaroo with Rafferty and Tingwell, was announced for an important role. He ended up not appearing in the film. In November, Robert Newton's casting was confirmed, as was that of James Mason, who would reprise his role as Rommel.

Filming started December 1952. Australian journalist Alan Moorehead was used as a consultant and the technical adviser was an Englishman now in the Canadian Army, Lieutenant Adrian (George) Acland, who took part in the defence of Tobruk.

The battle sequences were shot near Borrego Springs, a Californian desert town. Some background scenes were taken from the documentary Desert Victory (1943).

== Inaccuracies ==
The title of the film is a misnomer: The "Desert Rats" were actually the British 7th Armoured Division, the name coming from their jerboa shoulder flash. The Australian 9th Division besieged at Tobruk were denigrated as being "caught like rats in a trap" by German propaganda, the Australians proudly calling themselves "the Rats of Tobruk" as a result.

Also, Rommel is described as a field marshal at the time of the siege when he was actually a lieutenant-general (equivalent to a British major-general); he would become a field marshal in June 1942, after the fall of Tobruk.

Chips Rafferty and Charles Tingwell had both served in the army, and said they tried to correct inaccuracies in the script, but were only partly successful. "The script was full of Cockney idiom", said Rafferty. "I was invited to look over it a week before shooting began, and managed to get some of it changed into Australian slang." "There's one scene in which the sergeant – myself – refuses to obey the colonel's order, while two lieutenants stand idly by", added Rafferty. "That will raise some Ninth Division eyebrows."

A key plot point involved the Australian general deliberately letting German tanks through the defences. "To my knowledge there was no such plan to let the Germans in through the outer defences", said Tingwell. "But whenever difficulties of that sort were mentioned the Hollywood experts claimed to be working on a script based on the actual battle plans of the campaign."

Other criticisms made of the film include the fact no British officer was ever placed in command of an Australian battalion in Tobruk, and there was no raid on the ammunition dump as depicted, although there was one on the Twin Pimples, held by Italy, and there is no depiction of the British, Polish or Indian troops who were also there.

Prior to the film being screened, Chips Rafferty admitted it was likely the film would be criticised by ex-servicemen. "To tell the truth, I think there's going to be a bit of a howl", he said. This prediction proved to be correct. Lieutenant-General Sir Leslie Morshead said that, "The story is wholly foreign to the Tobruk I knew, and to its force which comprised almost as many gallant, purposeful British troops as those of the Ninth Division, all of whom I had the honour to command."

== Reception ==
The film received generally good reviews from British critics, although they complained the British contribution to the campaign had been minimised. Australian critics were also positive despite the historical inaccuracies.

FilmInk argued "the siege of Tobruk, while a tremendous feat of arms, is difficult to visually dramatise on film because the fighting involved so much lying down on the ground and shooting at tanks and night fighting and doesn’t have an obvious climax" and said these were problems in the 1944 Rats of Tobruk as well as The Desert Rats.

The film was banned in Egypt.

During production, 20th Century Fox offered Charles Tingwell, who had also appeared in Fox's Kangaroo, a seven-year contract, but he turned it down because he wanted to keep working in Australia.

== See also ==
- The Rats of Tobruk, an Australian 1944 film
- Western Desert Campaign
- North African Campaign
