= Steve Dodd =

Australian soldier and actor (1928–2014)

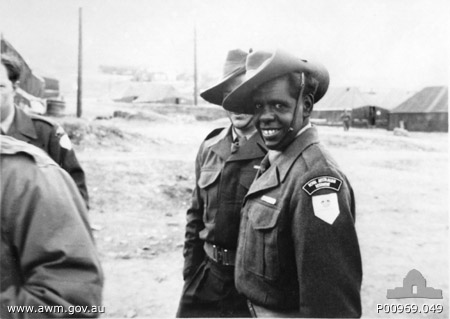
- Steve Dodd, serving with the Australian Army in Korea (1953), Australian War Memorial
- Born: 1 June 1928; Unclear (see below)
- Died: 10 November 2014 (aged 86); Basin View, Australia
- Occupations: Actor, soldier, stockman
- Years active: 1946–2008

Steve Dodd (1 June 1928 – 10 November 2014) was an Aboriginal Australian actor, notable for playing Aboriginal characters across seven decades of Australian film. After beginning his working life as a stockman and rodeo rider, Dodd was given his first film roles by prominent Australian actor Chips Rafferty. His career was interrupted by six years in the Australian Army during the Korean War, and limited by typecasting.

Dodd performed in several major Australian movies, including Gallipoli and The Chant of Jimmie Blacksmith, in which he played Tabidgi, the murdering uncle of the lead character. He also held minor parts in Australia-based international film productions including The Coca-Cola Kid, Quigley Down Under and The Matrix. He likewise appeared in minor roles in early Australian television series, such as Homicide and Rush, as well as later series including The Flying Doctors. In 2013, Dodd was honoured with the Jimmy Little Lifetime Achievement Award at the 19th Deadly Awards at the Sydney Opera House. He died in November 2014.

== Life and career outside acting ==
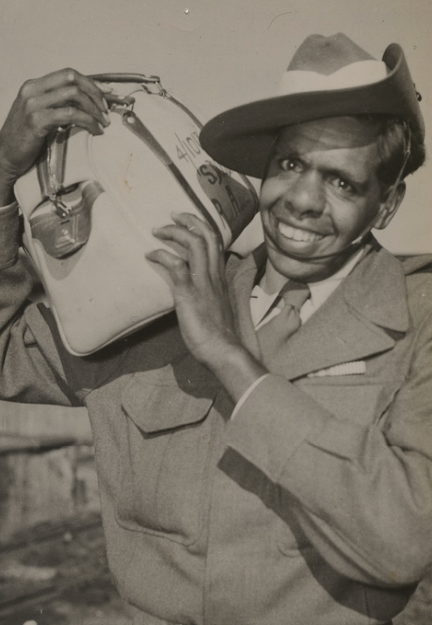
Dodd upon his return from service in the Korean War in 1953

Stephen Dodd, also known as Mullawa, Mulla Walla, or Mullawalla (flying fish), was an Arrernte Aboriginal man from central Australia. Sources vary regarding his place of birth, and whether it was in the Northern Territory or South Australia: a 1966 article in the New South Wales Aborigines Welfare Board magazine Dawn states he was born in Alice Springs, Northern Territory, and one 1973 newspaper source states he was born at the Hermannsburg Mission, to the south-west of Alice Springs. However, his entry on the Department of Veterans' Affairs' Nominal Roll of Australian Veterans of the Korean War states he was born at Oodnadatta, in the far north of South Australia. A 1953 newspaper report about his return from service in Korea states that he was from Coober Pedy in the far north of South Australia, and had been a resident of the Colebrook Home for Aboriginal Children just outside the small town of Quorn in the Flinders Ranges further south, which housed Aboriginal children from northern South Australia; some residents subsequently identified as members of the Stolen Generations. In 1969, Dodd visited the now relocated home in Eden Hills for the 80th birthday celebrations for Sister Delia Rutter, who had looked after him as a boy when the home was at Quorn. The only birth date record is in the Korean War nominal roll, which gives 1 June 1928.

After enlisting in the Australian Army for a six-year term in April 1951, Dodd underwent infantry training before being posted to the 1st Battalion, Royal Australian Regiment (1 RAR); his service number was 41018. In September, 1 RAR was warned for service in the Korean War, which had begun in 1950. After a farewell march through Sydney, 1 RAR boarded the troopship HMT Devonshire on 18 March 1952. Unit training was completed in Japan, and 1 RAR arrived in South Korea on 6 April and occupied positions on the Jamestown Line on 19 June, under the command of the 28th Commonwealth Infantry Brigade. At this stage of the war, the fighting had settled into fairly static trench warfare, and 1 RAR was occupied with duties including defence, repairing minefield fences, patrolling, reconnaissance, and raids on enemy trenches. In July 1952, 1 RAR suffered four killed and 33 wounded during Operation Blaze, and captured its first prisoner in September, before being relieved in the line at the end of that month. Returning to the trenches in December, 1 RAR had a difficult task re-establishing a poorly maintained position, and suffered 50 casualties. During the same month the battalion participated in Operation Fauna, destroying an enemy position for the loss of three missing and 22 wounded. Relieved just before New Year's Day 1953, Operation Fauna became the unit's last action of the war, as it remained in a rest area until it was replaced by the 2nd Battalion, Royal Australian Regiment, in March. During its time in Korea, 1 RAR suffered a total of 42 killed and 107 wounded, and spent long periods in close proximity to the enemy in forward positions. After his return from Korea, Dodd transferred to the Royal Australian Army Ordnance Corps, and completed his term of service in early 1957.

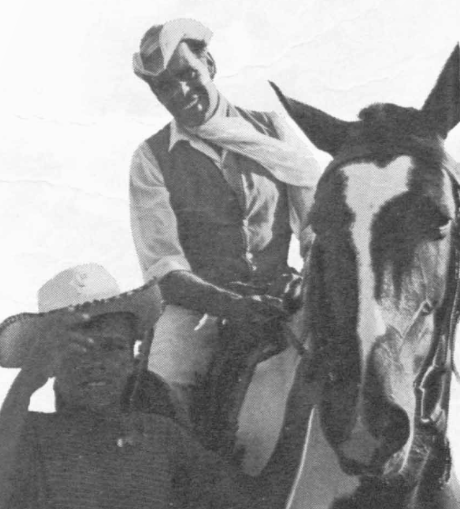
Dodd (on horseback in 1966), worked for rider and entertainer Smoky Dawson.

In 1966 he was reported to be a bachelor; later sources shed no light on his marital status. In 1971 he remarked in an interview that his father and six brothers were living in the Northern Territory. In the 19th and 20th centuries, Indigenous Australian men played significant roles as stockmen in the Australian pastoral industry, and as entertainers participating in competitive demonstrations of stockmen's skills, referred to as rough riding. Dodd worked as a stockman, horse breaker and rodeo rider prior to and during his acting career, including a period working for rider and entertainer Smoky Dawson. He was a member of the Rough Riders Association, and gave exhibition rides at the Calgary Stampede in 1964.

From 1969 to at least 1973 Dodd worked as a guide for Airlines of New South Wales, escorting tours to Uluru and other locations in central Australia. Dodd stated that he demonstrated boomerang and spear-throwing at Expo 70, and at an Olympic Games (though which year is unknown). He was also a participant in a re-enactment of Captain James Cook's landing in Australia, as part of the Australian Bicentenary celebrations. In 1985, Dodd was living in Manly, New South Wales, having spent fifteen years in Sydney's northern suburbs. For the last two decades of his life, Dodd lived at St Georges Basin on the south coast of New South Wales, where he died on 10 November 2014, aged 86.

== Acting career ==
=== Early career ===
Dodd's first opportunity to act in Australian film came in 1946, when the actor Chips Rafferty noticed Dodd on the set of The Overlanders – a film set in the northern Australian bush during World War II – and arranged for him to have a minor role. Two Aboriginal actors who, unlike Dodd, are credited for their parts in the film, were Henry Murdoch and Clyde Combo, who worked alongside Dodd on later movies like Bitter Springs and Kangaroo.

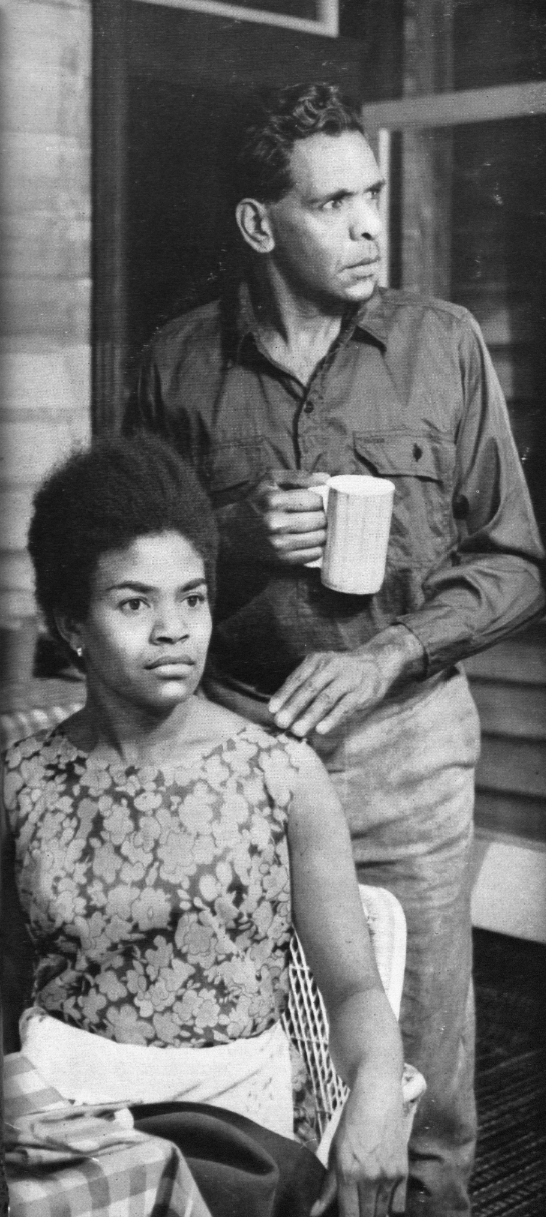
Dodd as Darky Morris and Patsy Kruger in Desire of the Moth in 1966

The Overlanders was the first of three Rafferty movies in which Dodd secured a part, the second being Bitter Springs in 1950, another Ealing Studios film. The film was about a family of white settlers fighting to take possession of land and resources from an Aboriginal clan. It was notable for being "a serious study of the relations of white settlers and Aborigines", and "more honest than most Australian film-makers ventured to be at that time". Film writer Bruce Molloy described Bitter Springs as a "lucid and dramatically effective representation" of black–white conflict in colonial Australia, giving Indigenous Australians "a degree of justice long denied them in cinematic representation". Dodd had been working on Bitter Springs as a tracker and interpreter for the actor Michael Pate when Rafferty arranged for Dodd to have an on-screen role. There was a positive relationship between the local Aboriginal people and the cast and crew, particularly Rafferty, involved in the location filming for Bitter Springs in the area of Quorn in northern South Australia. Pate said that Rafferty "wasn't a prejudiced person ... Chips was a person who appreciated the Aborigine [sic] very much ... he got on very well with the people". Dodd, meanwhile, appreciated Rafferty's vision for an Australian film industry and its potential to provide opportunities for Indigenous Australians. During the making of Bitter Springs the producers were sharply criticised for their poor treatment of the uncredited Aboriginal actors employed on the movie. Rafferty was also the star of the film that gave Dodd his third minor on-screen role, the American production Kangaroo in 1952.

In 1957, the J. Arthur Rank organisation, a British company, came to Australia to make a film adaptation of Robbery Under Arms, an Australian colonial novel by Rolf Boldrewood. Dodd reported travelling to Britain and the United States with the company for six months, where he gained experience; in what role is unknown. Dodd also stated that he worked with Rafferty on a fourth film, Wake in Fright, in 1971, but Dodd's name does not appear in published cast lists. He also reported that in the same year, he was cast in the role of an Aboriginal caretaker in a short film titled Sacrifice, which is held by the National Film and Sound Archive. In 1974, he appeared in a short film titled Me and You Kangaroo.

Dodd also had several roles in theatre. In 1966, he performed the role of Darky Morris in J. C. Williamson's stage production of Desire of the Moth, with a season of nearly three months in Melbourne and Sydney. In August 1971, he appeared in an early Sydney production of Kevin Gilbert's seminal work, The Cherry Pickers. The play also featured fellow Aboriginal actor Athol Compton, and was highly commended in the Captain Cook Bicentenary Competition. In October of the same year, Dodd was a prominent guest at the launch of Identity, a magazine published by the Aboriginal Publications Foundation that was described by the Chairman of the Council for Aboriginal Affairs H. C. Coombs as one "whereby Aborigines can talk to other Aborigines and can also talk to us".

There were numerous small television roles for Dodd. His work for Smoky Dawson included appearing in the television series Adventure with Smoky Dawson: Tim Goes Walkabout, broadcast in June 1966. In other television work, Dodd participated in a Channel 7 documentary series about pioneering Australian transport company Cobb and Co, and also worked on several documentary programs for the Australian Broadcasting Corporation. Dodd had minor roles in many early Australian TV dramas of the 1960s and 1970s, including Whiplash, Skippy the Bush Kangaroo, Division 4, Delta (1969), Riptide (1969), Woobinda – Animal Doctor (1970), Spyforce (1972–73), Homicide (1974), and Rush (1976). In March 1969 it was reported that he had been cast in a new series titled Sparky, the Koala Bear to be filmed after Easter that year. In 1973 it was reported that a television film Marra Marra featuring prominent Aboriginal actors David Gumpilil and Bob Maza, together with Dodd and Zac Martin, had been completed by Spinifex Productions.

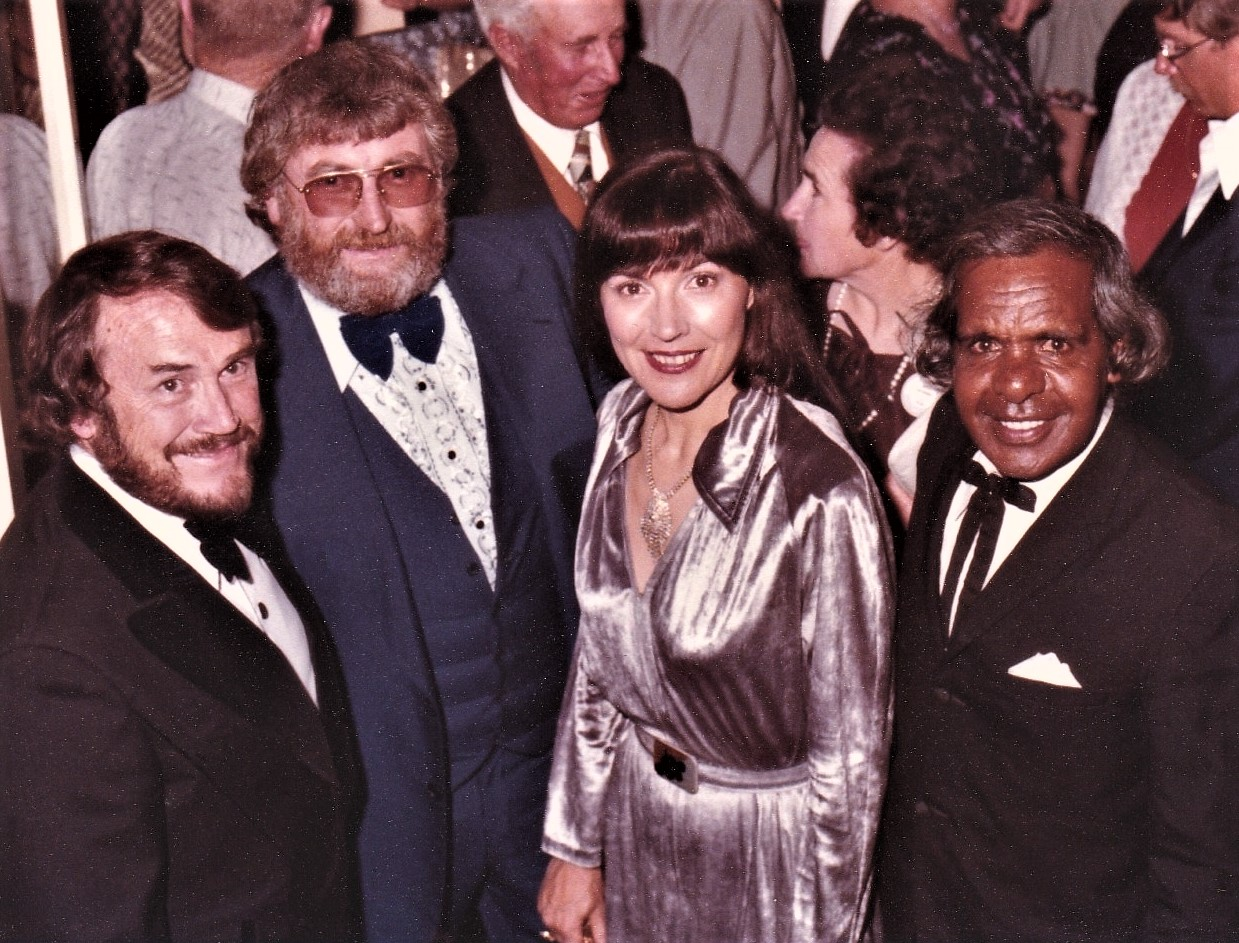
Dodd (right) at the world premiere of Little Boy Lost in November 1978

Although Dodd obtained small parts in several television series, for many years he and his fellow Aboriginal actors found themselves included in only minor and typecast roles in television productions. According to Indigenous actor, historian and activist Gary Foley, Dodd joked that "he was sick of roles where his total dialogue was, 'he went that way, Boss!'" Reflecting on this issue, a commentator remarked on the 1978 film Little Boy Lost: "There are many irrelevant scenes, the most obvious one being where Tracker Bindi (Steve Dodd), an Aboriginal, is introduced – yet another tired reinforcement of a false stereotype.

=== Later career ===
Dodd contributed to several films in which issues facing Indigenous Australians, such as land rights and race relations, were the central subjects. These appearances included Bitter Springs and The Chant of Jimmie Blacksmith (1978), the first of two films in which he appeared alongside Jack Thompson. Dodd played the character of Tabidgi, the uncle of the lead character, Aboriginal man Jimmie Blacksmith. In the film, Jimmie Blacksmith marries a white woman named Gilda Marshall (played by Angela Punch McGregor). When they have a baby, Dodd's character, "a tribal elder, ... is worried about Jimmie's marriage to a white woman and has brought him a talisman to keep him safe". Pauline Kael, writing in The New Yorker, described the performances of the two black professional actors (Jack Charles and Dodd) as "wonderful as sots: ... Steve Dodds [sic], who is tried for murder and simply says, 'You'd think it would take a good while to make up your mind to kill someone and then to kill them, but take my word for it, it only takes a second'".

Dodd's career was busiest in the 1980s, and by 1985 it was reported that he had acted in 55 movies or television features. In 1981 he played Billy Snakeskin in the film Gallipoli, about the fate of young men who participated in the World War I Gallipoli Campaign of 1915. This was followed by parts in Chase Through the Night and Essington, both in 1984. In 1985 he played the role of Mr Joe in The Coca-Cola Kid, an Australian romantic comedy with an international cast including Eric Roberts and Greta Scacchi. In 1986 he appeared in the film Short Changed. He also had minor parts in the popular television series Homicide (1964–1977), Division 4 (1969–1975), Rush (1974–1976) and The Flying Doctors (1985––1988).

The Chant of Jimmie Blacksmith was not the only film in which Dodd appeared that addressed topical Indigenous issues of the day. A decade after Jimmie Blacksmith, Dodd performed in Ground Zero, again with Jack Thompson in one of the lead roles. This film is a thriller based on claims that Indigenous Australians were used as human guinea pigs in the British nuclear tests at Maralinga. The film uses as its context the McClelland Royal Commission, which was investigating radioactive contamination at the site. In the film, Dodd plays a minor character named Freddy Tjapaljarri.

Sources differ on whether Dodd had a part in Evil Angels (released as A Cry in the Dark outside of Australia and New Zealand), the 1988 film about the Azaria Chamberlain disappearance, with Dodd's name not included in the cast list published by Australian Film 1978–1994. In 1988 he played a minor role in Kadaicha, an unreleased horror film about a series of unexplained murders. In 1990 Dodd appeared in two films: Quigley Down Under, a western made in Australia but starring American Tom Selleck and Briton Alan Rickman; and The Crossing, an Australian drama set in a country town.

Dodd's career returned to politically contentious Indigenous issues when he played a minor role, of Kummengu, in the 1991 film Deadly. This film is a police drama based around the death of an Indigenous man in police custody. As with Ground Zero, the subject was very topical: the movie was released at the same time as the report of the Royal Commission into Aboriginal Deaths in Custody, which had for four years been examining why so many Indigenous Australians died in police detention.

In 1999, Dodd was one of three actors in Wind, a short film portraying the pursuit of an old Aboriginal man (Dodd) by a young black tracker and a white police sergeant. That same year was marked by the most commercially successful film of his career, The Matrix. Later, Dodd played minor roles in an episode of television series The Alice (2006) and the movies My Country (2007) and Broken Sun (2008); his career in film and television lasted for sixty-seven years.

In 2013, Dodd received the Jimmy Little Lifetime Achievement Award at the 19th Deadly Awards at the Sydney Opera House. Departing from tradition by presenting the award to someone who was not primarily a musician, the organisers described Dodd as "a pioneer and leader for our people in the field of the arts, showing resilience and dogged determination – barriers were not going to hold him back". They also described him as "an actor that created a pathway for others across the entire arts and music sectors to follow, at a time when typecasting stereotypes and discrimination was the 'norm' in Australia's arts industry".

== Filmography ==
Film	Year	Character	Sources and notes
The Overlanders	1946	minor role	Feature film
Bitter Springs	1950	minor role	Feature film
Kangaroo	1952	minor role	Feature film
Wake in Fright	1971		Feature film Does not appear in published cast lists, but Dodd reported working on the film.
Me and You Kangaroo	1974		Short film Held by the National Film and Sound Archive
Little Boy Lost	1978	Bindi (tracker)	Feature film
The Chant of Jimmie Blacksmith	1978	Tabidgi	Feature film
Gallipoli	1981	Billy Snakeskin	Feature film
Chase Through the Night	1984	Narli	Miniseries; Held by the National Film and Sound Archive
Essington	1984		Feature film
The Coca-Cola Kid	1985	Mr Joe	Feature film
Short Changed	1986	Old Drunk	
Ground Zero	1987	Freddy Tjapalijarri	Feature film
Evil Angels (A Cry in the Dark)	1988	Nipper Winmatti	Feature film Dodd does not appear in the cast list in Murray.
Kadaicha	1988		Feature film
Young Einstein	1988		Feature film Dodd does not appear in the cast list in Murray, but this is a condensed one.
The Water Trolley (short film)	1988		Feature film Held by the National Film and Sound Archive
Quigley	1990	Kunkurra	Feature film
The Crossing	1990	Old Spider	Feature film
Spirit of the Blue Mountains	1990	Presenter	Documentary (Screen Australia)
Deadly	1991	Kummengu	Feature film
Wind	1999	Old Aboriginal Man	Short film
The Matrix	1999	Blind man	Feature film
My Country	2007	Old Uncle	Short film
Broken Sun	2008	Aboriginal Man	Feature film
