= The Kangaroo Kid =

1950 film by Lesley Selander

- Australian film poster
- Directed by: Lesley Selander
- Written by: Sherman Lowe
- Based on: story by Anthony Scott Veitch
- Produced by: T.O. McCreadie; Harry C. Brown (assoc); Ben Sheil (exec)
- Starring: Jock Mahoney; Veda Ann Borg
- Cinematography: W. Howard Greene
- Edited by: Alex Ezard
- Music by: Wilbur Sampson
- Production company: Allied Australian Films
- Distributed by: British Empire Films (Aust); Eagle Lion (US)
- Release dates: September 1950 (U.S.); March 1951 (Australia)
- Running time: 72 mins
- Countries: Australia; United States
- Language: English
- Budget: £90,000

The Kangaroo Kid is a 1950 Australian-American Western film directed by Lesley Selander.

== Plot ==
In the 1880s, the Remington detective agency sends Tex Kinnane to Australia to track down a notorious gold robber and murderer called John Spengler. In Sydney, stockman Tex makes friends with another stockman, Baldy Muldoon and travels with him to the small town of Gold Star, where Baldy's wife runs the local saloon. Tex adopts a baby kangaroo and earns the name "Kangaroo Kid". He is hired as a stage coach driver and befriends barmaid Stella Grey, who offers to look after his kangaroo.

Tex is challenged to a shooting match by local outlaws Phil Romero and Robey, but Tex outshoots them, causing a fistfight. Sgt Jim Penrose warns him about his behaviour. Penrose visits his girlfriend, Mary, who says that her father, miner Steve Corbett, has been acting strangely since Tex arrived and wants to leave town.

Vincent Moller, a corrupt American lawyer living in Australia for health reasons, plans to rob the stage coach with Crobett, Romero and Robey as well as implicate Tex. Corbett is reluctant to join in and Moller plans to kill him.

Tex is driving the stage when it is held up by Romeo and Robey, who kill the guard and knock out Tex, leaving him in the bush. Sgt Jim Penrose is convinced he is guilty. He tracks down Tex and puts him in jail for robbery and murder. Moller visits Tex and agrees to arrange his escape if he leaves the country quickly. This makes Tex suspicious. He escapes and proves that Moller is John Spengler.

Tex takes Moller back to the US but promises to return for Stella.

== Cast ==
- Jock Mahoney as Tex Kinnane
- Veda Ann Borg as Stella Gret
- Guy Doleman as Sergeant Jim Preston
- Martha Hyer as Mary Corbett
- Douglass Dumbrille as Vincent Moller
- Alec Kellaway as Baldy Muldoon
- Grant Taylor as Phil Romero
- Alan Gifford as Steve Corbett
- Hayde Seldon as Ma Muldoon
- Frank Ransome as Robey
- Clarrie Woodlands as Black Tracker
- Charles McCallum as Cummings
- Raymond Bailey as Quinn
- Ben Lewin as Fanning
- Sheila McGuire as Girl in Carriage

== Production ==
The McCreadie brothers had made two films and for their third decided on a co-production with Hollywood. It was intended to be the first of a series of co-productions and was budgeted at US$200,000 Producer Howard Brown had extensive experience making movies on location.

The film was based on a story by Australian writer, Tony Scott Veitch, but rewritten by an American screenwriter. John English was originally announced as director, but was later replaced by Lesley Selander. At one stage Richard Denning and Adele Jergens were announced for the leads.

Selander arrived in February 1950 and filming began the following month. Location shooting was done in Sofala and interior work at Commonwealth Film Laboratories in Sydney. There was an American director, cinematographer and four imported actors: Jock Mahoney, Veda Ann Borg, Martha Hyer and Douglas Dumbrille. Douglas Dumbrille had previously appeared in another Australian-set Western, Captain Fury (1939). Hyer was a last-minute replacement for Dorothy Malone, who was too ill to travel. It was an early star role for stunt man Jock Mahoney.

Filming took six weeks and Selander returned to the United States in May.

Selander later said "the facilities there were rather primitive by Hollywood standards but we had fun, loved the people and got a kick out of the whole thing. Jock is without a doubt the best athlete I've ever seen, smooth and sleek as a cougar."

== Reception ==
The movie was meant to be the first of a series of co-productions involving the McCreadie Brothers' Embassy Pictures – two more Kangaroo Kid films were announced, to be shot in December 1950 – but this did not eventuate. Reviews were unenthusiastic.

Film Reviewer Stephen Vagg described the film as "an essentially American story transplanted to Australia."

== See also ==
- Stingaree (1934)
- Rangle River (1936)
- Captain Fury (1939)
- Raw Deal (1977)
- Quigley Down Under (1990)
