= T. O. McCreadie =

Australian film director and producer

Tom McCreadie (1907–1992), better known as T. O. McCreadie was an Australian film director and producer, who was also involved in distribution and exhibition for many years.

== Biography ==
Tom and his brother Alec worked as exhibitors in Sydney in the 1920s. In 1940 they formed Embassy Pictures and made several shorts. In 1946 they re-recorded the Russian film Memory's Harvest with English dialogue, the first time this had been attempted in an Australian film. The movie was about a Russian taxi driver who becomes a Bolshoi opera star; among the actors they used for dubbing were Peter Finch and John Fernside.

The McCreadies began feature film production in 1948 with Always Another Dawn, which gave early lead roles to Charles Tingwell and Guy Doleman. The brothers produced and would handle their own publicity; Tom McCreadie would also help design sets. In 1948 they announced plans to make two films in 1949 and three or four in 1950. In the event they only produced two more movies before Embassy Pictures wound up in 1950. Among their unmade projects was an adaptation of a book by Dale Collins, Vulnerable.

== Filmography ==
- Memory's Harvest (1947) – Australian version
- Always Another Dawn (1948) – director, producer, co-writer
- Into the Straight (1949) – director, producer
- The Kangaroo Kid (1950) – producer
- Far West Story (1952) (short) - producer
