= I Found Joe Barton =

- Directed by: Francis D. Lyon
- Starring: Bud Tingwell; Lloyd Berrell
- Country of origin: Australia
- Original language: English

Production
- Producer: Grace Gibson
- Running time: 30 minutes

Original release
- Release: 10 October 1952

I Found Joe Barton, also known as The Adventures of Al Munch, was a 1952 film made for American television starring Bud Tingwell and Lloyd Berrell. The first Australian drama show made specifically for television, it was the pilot for a series which did not eventuate called The Adventures of Al Munch. However it screened in some cinemas.

== Plot ==
Al Munch (Bud Tingwell) is an American private eye who served in Sydney during World War II and decided to stay on. He is hired by Hollywood film producer, Frankoff, to find Joe Barton, an American crime figure thought to be dead but who is now said to be alive in Australia. Frankoff has made a film of his life but needs a clearance from Barton before he can release it and hires Munch to locate him.

Munch contacts a lawyer, Timothy O'Leary, to find Barton, but then O'Leary is murdered. Munch discovers Barton and hands him over to the police for O'Leary's murder.

== Cast ==
- Bud Tingwell as Al Munch
- Lloyd Berrell
- Margo Lee

== Production ==
The series was the brainchild of American radio producer Grace Gibson, who was the largest packager of radio drama in Sydney. Although television was not introduced in Australia until 1956, she wanted to make a show for the American market using an Australian cast and crew, but American writers and directors. There were a number of Australian radio serials at the time about American characters.

Gibson originally got Ken G. Hall to direct Alan White in a test scene and sent to it some American colleagues but they were not impressed. American director Francis D. Lyon was flown out to do tests with Joe McCormick, Ken Wayne, White and Bud Tingwell. Tingwell was eventually cast and the film was shot over ten days.

There was emphasis on Australian flora and fauna: Frankoff has a pet koala in his room, Munch travels by boat across Sydney harbour, there are plenty of gum trees and kangaroos.

== Reception ==
The series did not sell to American television. Tingwell claims this is because they wanted Gibson to guarantee 39 episodes in 39 weeks and she was not sure she would be able to fulfil this order.

However, it did sell to an American distributor and play as a self-contained episode on independent TV stations in the US. In Australia it screened as a support feature in cinemas.

According to Filmink "The episode is a lot of fun to watch today if you don’t mind seeing all these American characters run around Sydney in what is basically an American story, complete with tough guy dialogue, a femme fatale, gunplay and a high death toll. There are campy laughs to be had with the producer holding a koala bear in his office, and Al Munch traipsing through the bush and seeing a kangaroo. There’s lovely location work of the Sydney CBD, Sydney Harbour and the bush. The photography is of extremely high quality and it helps immeasurably that it was all shot on film instead of video tape. The story itself is solid, with plenty of twists and turns; it is absolutely up to the standard by which it was to be measured (i.e. a 30 minute 1950s American detective show)."

In 1952 Charles Tingwell wrote a letter to a newspaper claiming the sale of old Australian films to US television would be bad for Australia's reputation.
