= Symphony in D (Voříšek) =

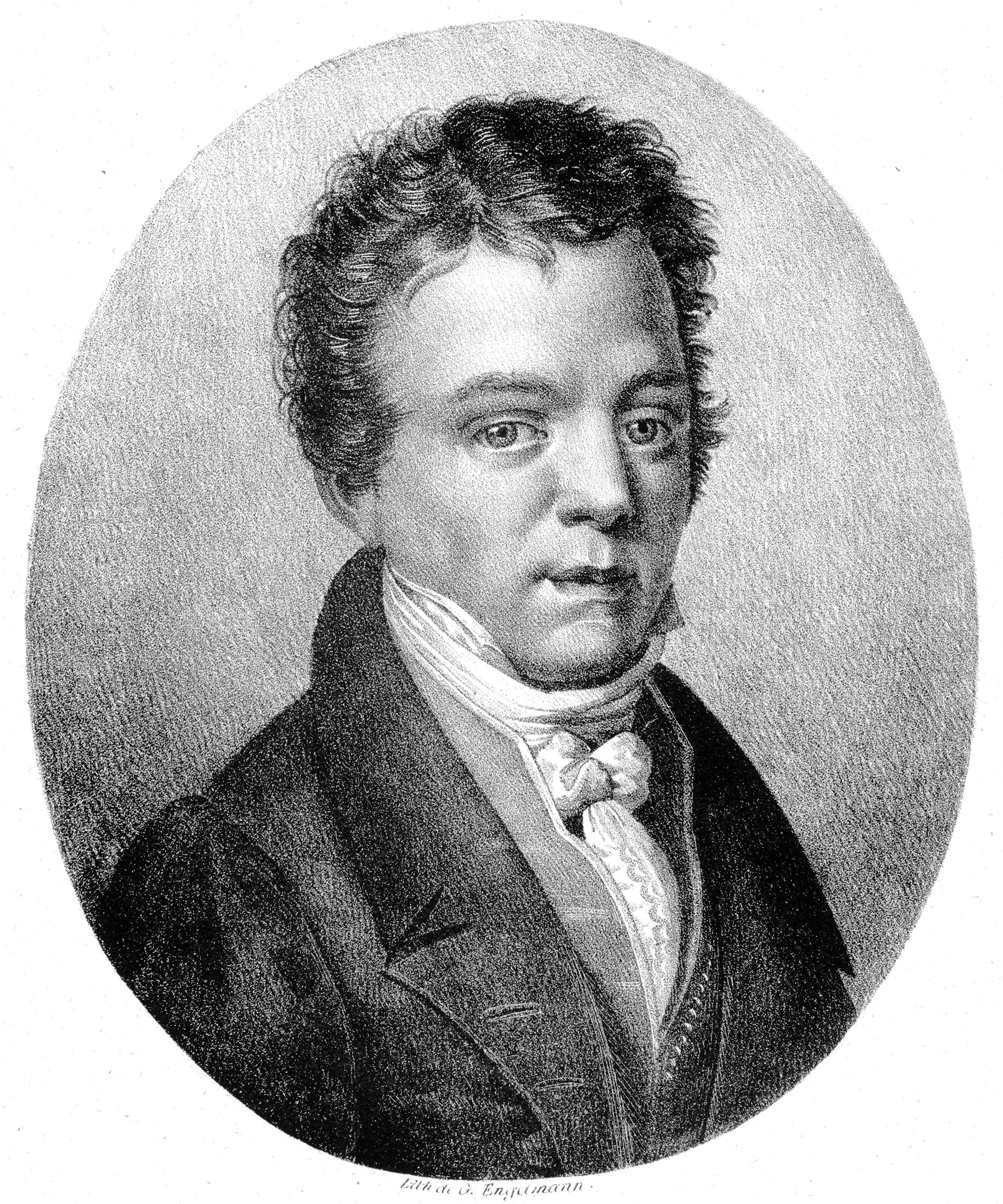
Jan Václav Voříšek

The Symphony in D, [Op. 23], is the only work in this genre by the Bohemian-born composer Jan Václav Voříšek. He wrote it in 1821 at age 30; he died young, at only 34.

The dedication to Aloys von Fuchs was inscribed in the composer's own hand on 14 April 1823.

The symphony has not been published during Voříšek's lifetime and originally bears no opus number. In some recordings, it bears op. 23, a number missing in Voříšek's original numbering. Confusingly, in some other recordings it bears op. 24, a number also attributed to Voříšek's Mass in B-flat.

It is scored for a standard classical orchestra typical of late Haydn or early Beethoven symphonies: 2 flutes, 2 oboes, 2 clarinets, 2 bassoons, 2 horns, 2 trumpets, timpani and strings. Indeed, it has often been compared to early Beethoven, although it was written only six years before that master's death, 16 months after Voříšek. He was a friend of Schubert and may well have been influenced by that composer as well.

The Symphony in D is Voříšek's most famous work, and is the first major Czech contribution to the 19th century symphonic literature.

The movements are:

1. Allegro con brio
2. Andante
3. Scherzo: Allegro ma non troppo
4. Finale: Allegro con brio

== Recordings ==
The Symphony in D has been recorded by:

- Czech National Symphony Orchestra under Paul Freeman
- Czech Philharmonic under Karel Ančerl
- Deutsche Kammerphilharmonie under Thomas Hengelbrock
- New Philharmonia Orchestra under Michael Bialoguski
- Prague Philharmonia under Jiří Bělohlávek
- Scottish Chamber Orchestra under Sir Charles Mackerras
- West German Sinfonia Orchestra under Dirk Joeres
- Leipzig Gewandhaus Orchestra under Herbert Blomstedt.
