= Wilbur Sampson =

Australian composer, conductor and musician

- Born: Wilbur Patey Sampson; 16 September 1914; Sydney, New South Wales, Australia
- Died: 28 April 1958 (aged 43); Sussex Inlet, New South Wales, Australia
- Occupations: Composer, musician, conductor
- Spouse: Phyllis Paren

Wilbur Patey Sampson (16 September 1914 – 28 April 1958) was an Australian composer, conductor and musician active from the mid-1930s. Sampson wrote music for a number of movies produced in the 1940s and 1950s starring Chips Rafferty or Charles Tingwell, including Always Another Dawn, Into the Straight, King of the Coral Sea and Smiley Gets a Gun.
