= Nonnie Piper =

Australian actress

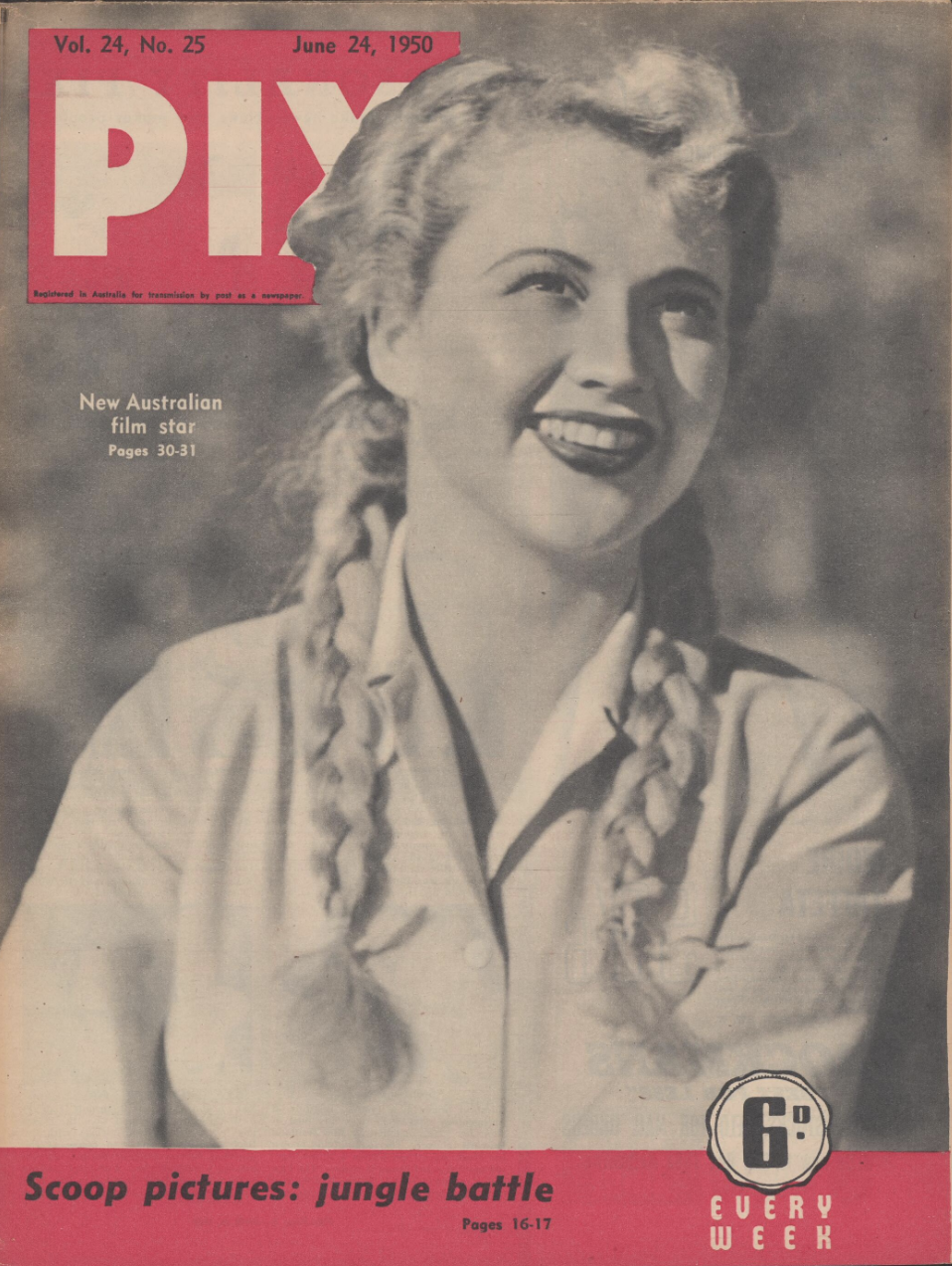
- Nonnie Piper, star of Bitter Springs, on the cover of PIX in 1950
- Born: Nonnie Peifer c. 1928; Sydney, New South Wales, Australia
- Died: 2020; England, United Kingdom
- Other names: Nonie "Peifer" None Piper (billed as)
- Occupations: Actress, model
- Spouse: Michael Bialoguski (m. ?-1984)

Nonnie Piper (born c. 1928 - 2020) known also as Nonie "Peifer" later known as None Piper, was an Australian actress and model. Her name is sometimes spelled in articles as Noni Piper Filmink called her a "spirited, pretty performer".

== Biography ==
Piper was born Nonnie Peifer was born in Sydney, New South Wales to Mr and Mrs. H.J Peifer, she had a younger sister Hellene. She was discovered by Charles Chauvel and cast in a small role in film Sons of Matthew. This led to a role in Into the Straight. She later changed her stage name to "None Piper" and was cast in the female romantic lead in Bitter Springs. She went to Hollywood in 1950 as a guest of Bing Crosby

She also won beauty contests.

She became an air hostess, and married Polish Australian Michael Bialoguski, a medical practitioner, musician and IA agent and they moved to England in the 1960s. She had a daughter named Janina.

== Filmography (select credits) ==
- Sons of Matthew (1949) (as "Nonie "Peifer")
- Into the Straight (1949) (as "Nonie "Peifer")
- Bitter Springs (1950)
