= Always Another Dawn =

- Directed by: T.O. McCreadie
- Written by: Zelma Roberts; T.O. McCreadie
- Based on: novel by Zelma Roberts
- Produced by: T.O. McCreadie; A.K. McCreadie (executive)
- Starring: Charles Tingwell; Guy Doleman
- Cinematography: Harry Malcolm
- Edited by: Alex Ezard
- Music by: Wilbur Sampson
- Production company: McCreadie Brothers Embassy Pictures
- Distributed by: Universal Pictures (Aust); Eroc Films (UK)
- Release date: 24 September 1948
- Running time: 108 mins (Aust); 73 mins (UK)
- Country: Australia
- Language: English
- Budget: £30,000

Always Another Dawn is a 1948 Australian wartime melodrama directed by T.O. McCreadie. It was the first leading role for Bud Tingwell.

== Synopsis ==
Terry Regan, from Camden, New South Wales, is the son of Molly Regan and a naval officer who died in action in 1916. Terry is called up to serve in the navy during World War II, and turns down a commission in order to see action early. He becomes friends with fellow sailor Warren and serves in the Mediterranean on HMAS Dauntless for two years. While home on leave he falls in love with his neighbour's daughter, Patricia, and they plan to marry on his next leave.

Dauntless is attacked and sunk by the Japanese during the Battle of the Java Sea; Terry is killed but Warren is among a handful of survivors. He goes to visit Molly and they talk about Terry.

== Cast ==
- Bud Tingwell as Terry Regan
- Guy Doleman as Warren Melville
- Queenie Ashton as Molly Regan
- Betty McDowall as Patricia
- Frank Waters
- Anne Lorraine
- Lloyd Lamble
- Reg Collins
- Charles Zoli
- Rod Gainford
- Frank Bradley
- Ben Lewin
- Babe Scott

== Production ==
=== Development ===
The script was co-written by New Zealand author Zelma Roberts, whose husband had been killed on active service with the New Zealand armed forces.

It was Charles Tingwell's first lead role and only his second film. Tingwell says he was offered the role after a screen test, and once he was cast he pulled out of being in the running for a part in Sons of Matthew. Terrence Coy, who plays Tingwell's character as a boy, won his role in a competition.

Although the ship in the film, Dauntless, was fictitious, it is based on the real-life HMAS Yarra, which was sunk by the Japanese in 1942 with only 13 survivors.

Tingwell said the original title was Another Dawn until the McCreadies were informed about an Errol Flynn movie with the same title, so they added "Always" to the front.

=== Shooting ===
The film was made with the co-operation of the Royal Australian Navy. Shooting began in February 1947 and lasted six months, taking place at Flinders Naval Depot, Camden, and aboard the destroyer HMAS Bataan. A small studio was provided by Commonwealth Film Laboratories.

During filming of the final battle in Port Phillip Bay, £300 went missing from the Bataan which represented payroll for the film crew.

According to Tingwell, "Tom McCreadie turned out to be a meticulous director who was easy to work with and who tried to get as much realism as possible into every shot. Alec McCreadie was his cautious executive producer."

Post production took another four months.

== Release ==
A novel based on the film was published in 1948.

=== Box office ===
The film only lasted in Sydney cinemas for two weeks but a shortened version was released in England.

=== Critical ===
Critical reception was not strong, the critic from The Sydney Morning Herald claiming that "the dialogue is stilted and unreal, character development is inadequate and stodgy, and the tale is not crystallised in terms of fluent camera action." The Argus thought "the film scores in its camera work - and in being 'so close to home.' The handling of its rather tragic story and its efforts to introduce comedy are not quite so impressive. Charles Tingwell and Guy Doleman are interesting male leads."

Variety wrote "cut to 30 minutes" the film "would make a fairly good documentary. As is, however, it will probably get by locally, but won't have overseas draw... The local Navy cooperated with McCreadie for some good sea stuff. Otherwise there's not much to "Dawn." Dialog is stilted and has too many flag-waving speeches. Both Charles Tingwelland Guy Doleman show promise as screen players and may go places later. Rest of cast very weak. This one won't put Aussie on the pic production map."

Filmink wrote the movie "has about 30 minutes of plot, with the rest of the running time padded out with training montages, a boxing match, a piano recital, and scenes of officers giving orders and sailors communicating" but still felt it had much to admire, including the cast, naval co operation and a "dreamy mood of doomed fatalism that permeates the movie... It's like everyone has taken a pill and is drifting off to fate with flowery voiceover. It's quite remarkable."

Tingwell says that the British critics were kinder than the Australian ones.

In later years Quentin Turnour, chief programmer with the National Film and Sound Archive, said the film demonstrated the tendency of Australian war movies to focus on the "reluctant warrior... By the time of Rats of Tobruk we're seeing that very laconic tone, a movie much more about the personal experience. Always Another Dawn... about the experience of Australian sailors, is a good example of that. There's a lot of sadness in that film, no glorification of war."

The McCreadie brothers were so pleased with Tingwell's performance they offered him a role in their next movie, Into the Straight and put the actor under a "retainer" until then which was unusual at the time. This resulted in Tingwell becoming "a sort of trainee/assistant to the editor."
