= Henry Murdoch =

Australian actor (1920–1987)

Henry Murdoch (17 September 1920 – 24 April 1987), born as George Henry Murdock, was an Aboriginal Australian actor and stockman who appeared in Australian films of the 1940s and 1950s. He was working as stockman in Rockhampton when discovered by Ralph Smart, who was helping make The Overlanders (1946). The film's director, Harry Watt, later claimed Murdoch and fellow aboriginal actor Clyde Combo "proved to be first-class actors and were exceedingly quick witted and intelligent. They certainly disproved the conventional idea that the Australian aboriginal is an animalistic caveman." Filmink said "It was Henry Murdoch who personified a specific type of role in the 1940s and 1950s, the aboriginal stockman who was a sidekick/tracker to the white hero."

Murdoch thought that was the end of his acting career, but he was called back to make several films by visiting companies in Australia. "I'd like to be a full-time actor and a part-time stockman", he said in 1949. "Film work's good—if there's enough of it." He later made two films for Lee Robinson.

Chips Rafferty claimed Murdoch carried a volume of Shakespeare with him.

== Filmography ==
=== Film ===
| Year | Title | Role | Notes |
|---|---|---|---|
| 1946 | The Overlanders | Aborigine Nipper | Feature film |
| 1949 | Eureka Stockade | | Feature film |
| 1950 | Bitter Springs | Blackjack | Feature film |
| 1952 | Kangaroo | Black Tracker (uncredited) | Feature film |
| 1953 | The Phantom Stockman | Dancer | Feature film |
| 1957 | The Shiralee | Sam | Feature film |
| 1958 | Dust in the Sun | Spider | Feature film |

=== Television ===
| Year | Title | Role | Notes |
|---|---|---|---|
| 1961 | Whiplash | Billy Jo | TV series, 4 episodes, (final appearance) |
