= Kangaroo (1952 film) =

1952 film by Lewis Milestone

- Directed by: Lewis Milestone
- Screenplay by: Harry Kleiner
- Based on: story by Martin Berkeley
- Produced by: Robert Bassler
- Starring: Maureen O'Hara; Peter Lawford
- Cinematography: Charles G. Clarke
- Edited by: Nick DeMaggio
- Music by: Sol Kaplan
- Color process: Technicolor
- Production company: Twentieth Century-Fox
- Distributed by: Twentieth Century-Fox
- Release dates: May 16, 1952 (New York); May 29, 1952 (Los Angeles); June 4, 1952 (Australia)
- Running time: 84 minutes
- Country: United States
- Language: English
- Budget: £800,000 or £890,000
- Box office: $1.25 million (U.S. rentals)

Kangaroo (also known as The Australian Story) is a 1952 American Western film directed by Lewis Milestone. It was the first Technicolor film filmed on location in Australia. The film was remade as The Jackals in Africa in 1967.

== Plot ==
In the 1900 Australian Outback, Dell McGuire worries about her missing father Michael, a local grazier. Actually, Michael is drunk in Sydney at a boarding house. He encounters Richard Connor, a desperate young man trying to find money to return home to America. Michael mistakes him for his long-lost son Dennis, whom Michael had abandoned to an orphanage years before. After a drunken Michael falls asleep, Connor roams the Sydney streets and meets the equally broke John Gamble outside a gambling house. Connor persuades Gamble to help him in rob the establishment. During the heist, the house's owner is shot.

Connor and Gamble abscond with the loot, stopping at the boarding house to collect Connor's gear, whereupon Michael, still drunk, pursues Connor down the street until he collapses. They find information on him regarding his extensive station and his boat ticket and pose as his business partners to board the boat and hide at his Outback ranch. Arriving at the station, they are both smitten by his daughter Dell, the local trooper Len, Dell's local beau, is suspicious. Connor and Gamble help the station to recover, rescuing stray cattle, thwarting a stampede and repairing a windmill during a violent storm.

Michael, convinced that Connor is his son, sees the romantic interest of his daughter in him and tells her his conclusion. Overhearing her despair at the news, Connor feels that he must confess, and Gamble sees their plan fail because of the annoying conscience of his partner. Having not only confessed his true identity but also the fact that both he and his companion are wanted for murder, Connor and Gamble are forced to flee the station, with Len in hot pursuit. When Len reaches them, Gamble attempts to shoot him when Connor pulls the gun away with a bullwhip. The two partners engage in a vicious bullwhip fight. Len fatally shoots Gamble and then takes Connor back to the McGuire station, where he recovers from his injuries. He is promised clemency for saving Len's life and a future with Dell.

== Cast ==
- Maureen O'Hara as Dell McGuire
- Peter Lawford as Richard Connor
- Finlay Currie as Michael McGuire
- Richard Boone as John W. Gamble
- Chips Rafferty as Trooper "Len" Leonard
- Letty Craydon as Kathleen
- Charles 'Bud' Tingwell as Matt
- Henry Murdoch as Piper
- Ronald Whelan as Fenner
- John Fegan as Burke
- Guy Doleman as Pleader
- Reg Collins as ship's officer
- Frank Ransom as Burton
- Marshall Crosby as Priest
- Clyde Combo as Aboriginal Stockman
- Reg Wyckham as Archibald
- George Sympson-Little as Bluey
- Steve Dodd
- Ron Shand as Accordion Player (uncredited)

== Production ==
In November 1948, Twentieth Century-Fox announced a film set in Australia at the turn of the century to be titled The Australian Story. It was to be based on an original story by Martin Berkeley and produced by Robert Bassler. The film was to be financed using studio funds frozen by the Australian government under post-war currency restrictions. Fox romantic leading man Tyrone Power was expected to star. Fox script writers read many Australian novels for background material.

In February 1949, Hedda Hopper reported that Fox was pursuing Cary Grant for the lead role. Jean Peters was announced as the female lead in April. In June 1949, Fox announced Dudley Nichols as the screenwriter and possibly the director. By July, Norman Reilly Raine was working on the script, which had also been titled The Land Down Under and Sundowner. In November, Fox announced the film's title as The Land Down Under. By December, it was reported that Power would not be the star.

In December 1949, associate producer Robert Snody and art director Lee Kirk scouted locations in Sydney for the film, now titled The Bushranger.

In January 1950, Fox announced that the film would be shot in Technicolor, with three writers currently working on the script. Filming was expected to begin in October.

In June 1950, Fox announced that Louis King would direct the film under a new five-year contract with the studio. However, Lewis Milestone was announced as the director in July. According to Henry Hathaway, Zanuck offered the film to Orson Welles, who declined.

In August 1950, Fox announced that it would borrow Peter Lawford from MGM to play the male lead. By the end of the month, the female lead was given to Constance Smith, who had just appeared in Fox's The Mudlark. However, Smith was assigned to star in The 13th Letter (1951) and her role was taken by Maureen O'Hara. In September, the second male lead was awarded to Richard Boone.

Milestone disliked the initial script and attempted to persuade Fox to replace it with a story based on Australian writer Brian Penton's books Landtakers and Inheritors. Although Fox refused, Milestone integrated some material from the novels into the final script. Milestone added the bullwhip duel scene.

O'Hara felt that Milestone had ruined the script and tried to withdraw from the film, but she was forced to remain in order to avoid a political incident.

Milestone relocated the film from New South Wales to Port Augusta, South Australia, where Fox built a base of operations.

Shooting was to commence on October 15, 1950, but production was delayed until November because of unexpected rain, lack of material and Finlay Currie's contractual requirements. In addition, the script was rewritten and the film's era was changed from the 1880s to 1900. The studio shipped a large quantity of technical equipment from Hollywood because it felt that the equipment in Australia was out of date. Production was delayed a further ten days when screenwriter Henry Kleiner underwent an appendix operation in Sydney. Shooting began in Sydney in November.

Because of a severe drought in Australia, Milestone planned to film the movie's climactic scene in Hollywood. However, the cast and crew attended a native rain dance on and, the next morning, rain finally fell. Filming wrapped on February 15, 1952.

== Release ==
Milestone claimed that Zanuck refused to preview the movie in Los Angeles and sent it to East Coast markets. A few months later, following poor performance, Zanuck demanded a new ending.

== Reception ==
In a contemporary review for The New York Times, critic Bosley Crowther wrote:

The concept of anguish and frustration that comes with the dwindling of the herd is conveyed in stark and gruesome images of cattle dropping out along the way and cowboys gazing back at them with expressions of silent despair. And the tax upon human endurance is visioned in realistic views of leather-skinned men in frayed sombreros drooping wearily in the hot and dust-filled air. That part of the film is heroic, and one can only wish that the rest of it was as simple and representative. Unfortunately, it isn't. The early part starts a tedious tale of cupidity and double-dealing that is in the familiar Western groove. Two scoundrels conspire to swindle a nice old cattleman out of his ranch—or his "station," as they call it in Australia—and go about it in the usual slinky way. And the final part is a wild concoction of a prairie fire, a cattle stampede, a hold-up by aboriginal bushmen, a battle with a whirling windmill, a fight with bull-whips between the swindlers and a romantic surrender of the younger swindler to the beautiful daughter of the owner of the ranch. In this melee of outdoor action there are spliced some interesting scenes of the fauna and flora of Australia, including some breathtaking shots of wild kangaroos leaping grandly and snakes wriggling meanly on the ground. And the episode with the thirsty bushmen, while a little hard to believe, does provide some fascinating glimpses of a fast-dwindling race of primitive men. But these phases of the picture—and therefore the picture as a whole—go into the classification of the frankly romantic and contrived. On this level it is amusing, although its performance, on the whole, is so conventional and artificial that it often tends to bore.

Critic Edwin Schallert of the Los Angeles Times wrote: "It has the realism of a film made in the actual locale. The picture is not, however, as big and epical a venture as one might have anticipated from original forecasts, probably because it becomes too much entangled with a plot, though it is definitely off the beaten path. ... It is unfortunate that a picture so fine in environment and atmosphere could not have achieved greater vitality and smoothness in its actual story."

When the film was released in Australia, initial box-office performance was strong, but reviews were negative and business soon declined.

== See also ==
- Cinema of Australia
