= Bitter Springs (film) =

1950 film by Ralph Smart

- British poster by Robert Medley
- Directed by: Ralph Smart
- Written by: Monja Danischewsky; W. P. Lipscomb
- Based on: Story by Ralph Smart
- Produced by: Michael Balcon; Leslie Norman (assoc)
- Starring: Tommy Trinder; Chips Rafferty; Gordon Jackson
- Cinematography: George Heath
- Edited by: Bernard Gribble
- Music by: Ralph Vaughan Williams
- Production company: Ealing Studios
- Distributed by: General Film Distributors
- Release dates: 24 June 1950 (Australia); 6 July 1950 (UK)
- Running time: 86 minutes
- Countries: United Kingdom; Australia
- Language: English
- Budget: £100,000
- Box office: £114,000

Bitter Springs is a 1950 British-Australian adventure drama western film directed by Ralph Smart and starring Tommy Trinder, Chips Rafferty, and Gordon Jackson. An Australian pioneer family leases a piece of land from the government in the Australian outback in 1900 and hires two inexperienced British men as drovers. Problems with local Aboriginal people arise over the possession of a waterhole.

Over 100 Aboriginal people were hired as extras for the film, who adlibbed much of their dialogue in their own language, which was not translated. A translated version has been created for distribution in 2026.

== Plot ==
In the early 1900s, Wally King travels 600 miles to outback South Australia to occupy land he has leased from the government. He is accompanied by his wife Ma, children Emma and John, and friends Tommy and Mac. Despite warnings from a local trooper, the bigoted King clashes with an Aboriginal tribe, who depend on water located on what has become the family's property.

Relations with the local Aboriginal people deteriorate to the point where John King is speared. The Kings are in danger of being killed by a raiding party but they are rescued by the trooper and his men. A compromise is reached where the Kings agree to work with the Aboriginal people running a sheep station.

== Cast ==
- Tommy Trinder as Tommy
- Chips Rafferty as Wally King
- Gordon Jackson as Mac
- Jean Blue as Ma King
- Michael Pate as Trooper
- Charles 'Bud' Tingwell as John King
- Nonnie Piper as Emma King
- Nicky Yardley as Charlie
- Henry Murdoch as Blackjack
- Steve Dodd as Aborigine (uncredited)

== Production ==
The film was the idea of Ralph Smart and roughly based on an apparently true story. This was the third movie Ealing Studios made in Australia following the success of The Overlanders (1946). It was originally announced as a comedy starring Rafferty and Trinder, and was meant to be followed by a version of Robbery Under Arms.

Trinder's part was created especially for him, to ensure the movie had some comic relief. Nick Yardley had previously appeared in Ralph Smart's Bush Christmas. Nonnie Piper was a 19-year-old model.

The original script ended with the massacre of Aboriginal people at the hands of the white settlers, but this was changed at the insistence of Ealing Studios.

Smart scouted around Australia for locations and at one stage it seemed that the film would be made in Murgon, Queensland, but eventually it was decided to make it in South Australia. Writer Dave Moore flew out to Australia to help with the script.

Much of the film was shot on location in the Flinders Ranges in South Australia, around Quorn and in Warren Gorge. Filming started in May 1949, with around 130 Aboriginal people from remote north-west of South Australia hired as extras for the film. Much of their work was improvised, and spoken in their Pitjantjatjara, and was not subtitled for the release. They had nowhere to stay when they arrived due to an administrative oversight and their treatment on set was criticised. Ealing wanted to pay Aboriginal actor Henry Murdoch the same as white actors but the Department of Native Affairs refused, only granting him a regular allowance. This was the first time that so many Aboriginal Australians had been used in a modern film of this kind, and the review in The Sydney Morning Herald reported that "the experiment was entirely successful... They prove to be such fine natural actors, with their graceful body movements, their dramatic expressions of emotion and their joyous laughter..."

During filming a man went around Adelaide pretending to be a talent scout for the film offering women the chance to appear in it. Location shooting was completed in November, nearly two months behind schedule due to rain delays, and was followed by two weeks at Pagewood Studios in Sydney.

Leslie Norman is credited as associate producer. He later recalled "I went out [to Australia] as a sort of hatchet man. It was a shame, but that film was awkward, a bit stiff and staid".

== Release ==
The film had its world premiere in Adelaide, which was attended by Don Bradman. Although reviews were generally respectful the film was a box office disappointment on release and Ealing abandoned its plans to make further movies in Australia. During filming, in June 1949, Ealing said that Ralph Smart would make Robbery Under Arms afterwards.

=== Translated version ===
Over 80 years after the film's release, linguists, along with people from the Aṉangu Pitjantjatjara Yankunytjatjara (APY Lands), worked together to create subtitles for the film, led by Margaret Brady, a social anthropologist and honorary associate professor at Australian National University. As part of the SA History Festival, a 30-minute documentary called Bitter Springs in Translation was screened each night on the Quorn Silo. The group are hoping to screen both the documentary and the fully-translated version of Bitter Springs at the Adelaide Film Festival in October 2026.

== Reception ==
The Monthly Film Bulletin wrote: "As a whole Bitter Springs suffers from a disconcerting uncertainty of purpose; it is fundamentally a serious study of the relations of white settlers and aborigines, but the film's sympathies are divided so evenly between the inexperienced and intolerant whites and the natives that the conflict loses force, while the final compromise is crudely suggested. The serious purpose of the film is also compromised by the casting of Tommy Trinder as an out of work circus employee accompanying the settlers; his music hall style of humour is quite out of place, and a number of over-worked jokes (such as his efforts to mount a horse) slow down the pace of this too leisurely film, without providing much compensating humour. Both in performance and direction Bitter Spring gives an unsatisfactory impression of amateurishness. Ealing Studios are to be praised for their enterprise in looking to the Dominions for original material, but they have made a film which is rough and unpolished without being genuinely fresh in treatment."

Variety wrote: "Smart has interwoven into the plot for femme appeal a well-constructed romance between Nonnie Piper (easy-to-look-at new Aussie'player) and Britisher Gordon Jackson. Michael Pate as a mounted gendarme of the backwoods gives a good performance, with the remainder of the cast adequate. ... Camera work by George Heath is superb. Bitter Springs is without doubt the best Aussie production turned out by Ealing."

Filmink magazine said "It's weird that Ealing Films thought this movie would be commercial… maybe they had visions of something like Cimarron, only there's hardly any female characters in it... In the filmmakers' defence, their hearts were in the right place and at least the film tries to tackle head on some of the issues of Australian settlement. And I actually think it could have found an audience had the filmmakers told the story from the point of view of female characters, like the later We of the Never Never. But Ealing, for all their progressive politics, were lousy at making films with female protagonists."

Leslie Halliwell said: "Thinnest of the Ealing attempts to make movies down under, suffering from a lack of pace and sharpness as well as obvious studio settings."

== See also ==
- Cinema of Australia
