= Jan Václav Voříšek =

Czech music educator, composer, pianist and organist

Jan Václav Hugo Voříšek
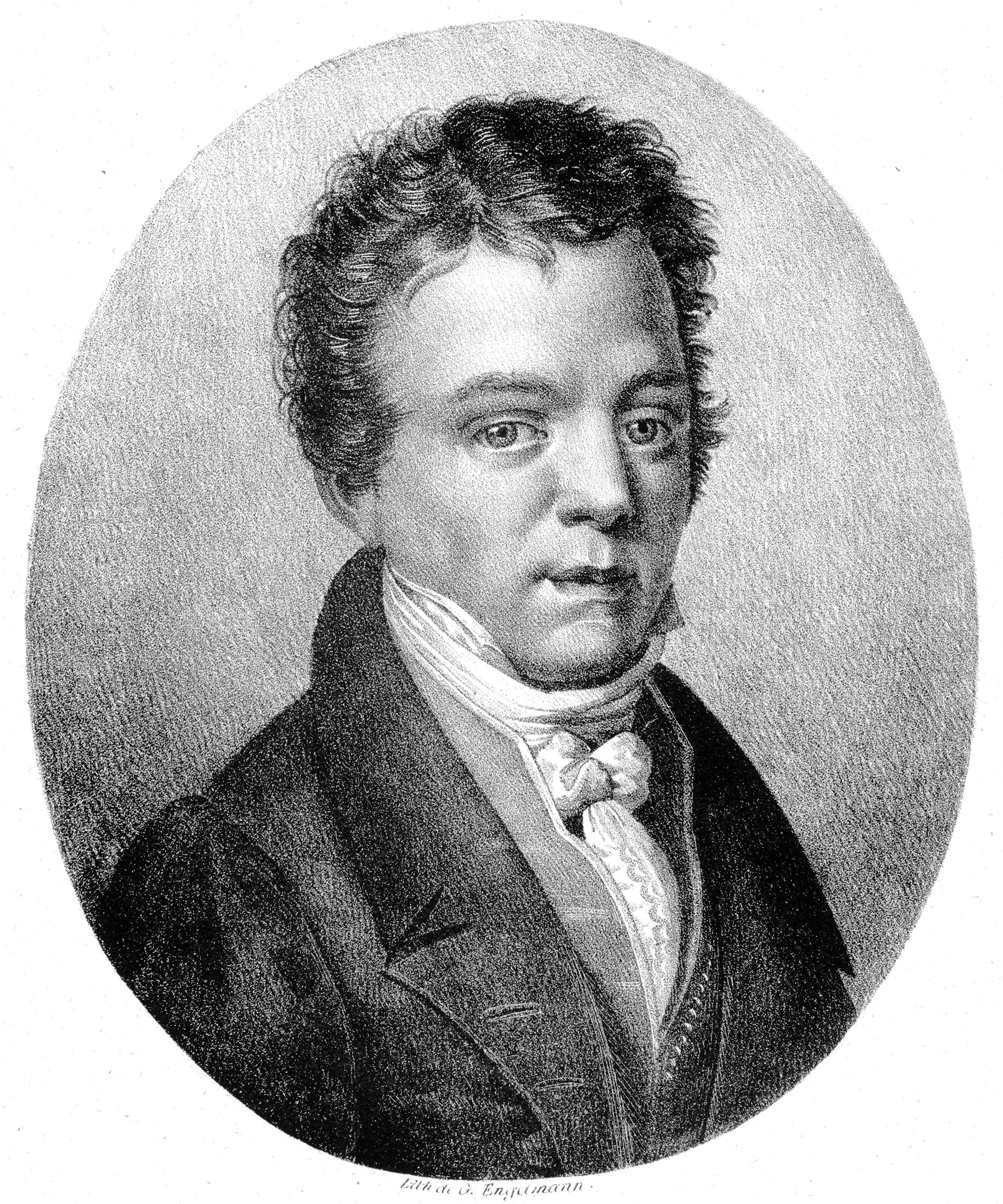

Background information
- Born: 11 May 1791; Vamberk, Bohemia
- Died: 19 November 1825 (aged 34) Vienna, Austrian Empire
- Occupation: Composer
- Instruments: Piano, organ

Jan Václav Hugo Voříšek (Czech pronunciation: [jan ˈvaːtslaf ˈɦuɡo ˈvor̝iːʃɛk]; German: Johann Hugo Worzischek; 11 May 1791 – 19 November 1825) was a Czech composer, pianist and organist.

== Life ==
Voříšek was born in the town of Vamberk, Bohemia, where his father was schoolmaster, choirmaster and organist. As a child prodigy, he started to perform publicly in Bohemian towns at the age of nine. His father taught him music, encouraged his playing the piano and helped him get a scholarship to attend the University of Prague, where he studied philosophy. He also had lessons in piano and composition from Václav Tomášek. He found it impossible to obtain sufficient work as a musician in Prague and in 1813, at the age of 22, moved to Vienna to study law, hoping to meet Beethoven. In Vienna Voříšek was able to greatly improve his piano technique under Johann Nepomuk Hummel, but once more failed to gain full-time employment as a musician.

Although Voříšek was enthralled by the classical style of Mozart, he was more intrigued by the incipient romanticism of Beethoven.

In 1814, as he was starting to compose, he did indeed meet Beethoven in Vienna. He also met other leading musicians there, including the composers Louis Spohr, Ignaz Moscheles, Hummel, and especially Franz Schubert with whom he became fast friends.

He completed his law studies in 1821 and was appointed barrister to the Court Military Privy Councillor, for whom he mainly drafted legal documents. But in 1822, he at last found musical employment as second court organist and ended his legal career. He was appointed first organist in 1824.

He soon won esteem as a composer of orchestral, vocal and piano music for orchestra. In 1818 he became conductor of the Society of Friends of Music in Vienna.

Vorišek started suffering from tuberculosis in 1820. He died, in Vienna, of respiratory arrest in 1825 at the age of 34. He was buried at the common cemetery in Währing (today's Währinger Park).

== Music ==
Voříšek wrote only one symphony, his Symphony in D major, in 1821.

In his capacity as imperial court organist, Voříšek composed a Mass in B-flat major. Together with his single symphony, some of his piano works and his Violin Sonata in G major, Op. 5, and the Mass have been recorded.

The first recorded use of impromptu as a musical term occurred in 1817, in the Allgemeine musikalische Zeitung. His Impromptus Op. 7 were published in 1822, pieces known to his friend Schubert who subsequently used the description for several sets of music for piano, as did Frederic Chopin and numerous other composers.

In 1823–24, he was, like Schubert, one of the 50 composers to contribute a variation on the same waltz by Anton Diabelli for the Vaterländischer Künstlerverein on which Beethoven composed his 33 variations (Op. 120).

== Selected discography ==
- Grand Rondo Concertante for Piano, Violin, Cello and Orchestra op25 (B09QNG2NC2), released 2022, coupled with Beethoven Triple Concerto - Lobkowicz Trio on Rubicon Classics
- Cedille Records recording (CDR 90000 058) of Voříšek's Symphony in D major and Mass in B-flat major with Paul Freeman and the Czech National Symphony Orchestra & Prague Chamber Choir, with program notes by Andrea Lamoreaux
- Cantus Classics 1993 recording (CACD 8.0019 D) of Voříšek's Symphony in D major and Mass in B-flat major with Oldrich Vlchek (resp. Václav Neumann) and the Virtuosi di Praga & Prague Chamber Choir.
- ArkivMusic.com first CD recording of Voříšek's chamber music including his Violin Sonata (Praga 250204), played by the Kocian String Quartet with program notes by James Reel, FANFARE
- Hyperion Records recording (CDA 66800) Voříšek's Symphony in D, with Charles Mackerras and the Scottish Chamber Orchestra.
- Opus 111 recording OPS 30241 Fantasia Op. 12, Impromptus Nos 1-6 Op. 7, Sonata in B flat minor and Variations in B flat Op. 19. Olga Tverskaya (piano)
- Regis Records recording RRC1224 Six Impromptus Op. 7, Sonata in B flat minor Op. 20, Variations in B flat Op. 19 and Fantasie Op. 12, also for piano.
- Centaur Records recording (CRC 3022) of select pieces for solo piano performed by David Gross
