= Guy Doleman =

New Zealand actor (1923–1996)

- Doleman in The Prisoner (1967)
- Born: 22 November 1923; Hamilton, Waikato, New Zealand
- Died: 30 January 1996 (aged 72); Los Angeles, California, U.S.
- Occupation: Actor
- Years active: 1948–1992

Guy Doleman (22 November 1923 – 30 January 1996) was a New Zealand actor, who worked extensively in Australia, the United Kingdom, and the United States. He was best known for playing Colonel Ross in the Harry Palmer spy film trilogy starring Michael Caine in the 1960s. He also played the first iteration of Number Two on the cult classic series The Prisoner.

== Early life ==
Doleman was born in Hamilton, Waikato in 1923. As a young adult, he moved to Australia, and began his acting career on the radio.

== Career ==
During the 1940s and 1950s, Doleman was one of the busiest actors in Australia, appearing in the majority of films made there at the time, and being busy on radio, particularly in the drama Hagen's Circus, which made him a radio star in that country. Radio historian Peter Philp grouped Doleman with Peter Finch, Grant Taylor, Rod Taylor and Lloyd Berrell as part of "a wild but very colourful group of actors... who in their own way helped forge a wonderful ambience which was unique to Sydney radio." He appeared in many early Australian films including The Phantom Stockman.

In 1952 he won a £300 Actor's Choice Award for his performance in the radio drama The Coward. He used this money to go to Hollywood for a film in September 1953, where he tested for some films.

He was cast in Long John Silver (1954) but passed on the role because it meant he had to wear contact lenses – Rod Taylor took the part instead. Doleman played minor roles in His Majesty O'Keefe and Alfred Hitchcock's Dial M for Murder (both 1954), and played Australian characters in Smiley (1956) and its sequel Smiley Gets a Gun (1958), The Shiralee (1957), and On the Beach (1959). He appeared on three episodes of the British-Australian bushranger television series Whiplash. In 1959, he starred in the play The Piccadilly Bushman at the Comedy Theatre in Melbourne.

In the early 1960s, Doleman moved to London, appearing on BBC and ITV television programming. He played Number Two in ITV's The Prisoner (1967). He was the first of a pair of Number Twos who appeared in the first episode, "Arrival"; the second being played by George Baker. He starred as intelligence officer Colonel Ross in the three film adaptations of Len Deighton's Harry Palmer novels, starring Michael Caine, released between 1965 and 1967. He also played supporting villain Count Lippe in the James Bond film Thunderball (1965), starring Sean Connery.

In the early 1970s, Doleman returned to Hollywood, and after a several-year hiatus returned to acting in an episode of The Six Million Dollar Man. He played guest roles in TV series like Matt Houston and The Colbys; and in Australian films like A Dangerous Summer (1982) and Goodbye Paradise (1983). His last acting role was in 1992 episode of Murder, She Wrote.

== Death ==
Doleman died of lung cancer in Los Angeles on 30 January 1996, aged 72.

== Filmography ==
- Always Another Dawn (1948) – Warren Melville
- Strong Is the Seed (1949) – William Farrer
- The Kangaroo Kid (1950) – Sgt. Jim Penrose
- Kangaroo (1952) – Pleader (uncredited)
- The Phantom Stockman (1953) – Mr. Stapleton
- His Majesty O'Keefe (1954) – Herr Weber
- Dial M for Murder (1954) – Detective (uncredited)
- Smiley (1956) – Bill McVitty
- The Adventures of Long John Silver (1957, TV Series) – Dr. Stanhope
- The Shiralee (1957) – Son O'Neill
- Smiley Gets a Gun (1958) – Quirk
- On the Beach (1959) – Lt. Cmdr. Farrel
- The Grey Nurse Said Nothing (1960, TV Movie)
- The Square Ring (1960, TV Movie)
- Whiplash (1961, TV Series) – Sundowner / Raike Dartner / Norris
- Follow the Sun (1961, TV Series) – Alex Cooper
- ITV Play of the Week (1962-1963, TV Series) – Walter Ramsden / Captain Lee
- No Hiding Place (1962-1964, TV Series) – Melvyn Kerry / Felix Seymour / James Conway
- The Avengers (1963, TV Series) – Oliver Waldner
- Jezebel ex UK (1963, TV Series) – Robin Coleridge
- Captain Sindbad (1963)
- The Dickie Henderson Show (1963, TV Series)
- BBC Sunday-Night Play (1963, TV Series) – Managing Editor
- The Edgar Wallace Mystery Theatre, "The Partner" (1963, TV Series) – Wayne Douglas
- The Hidden Truth (1964, TV Series) – Charles Medwin
- The System (1964) (aka: The Girl Getters) – Philip
- Boy with a Flute (1965, Short)
- Young Cassidy (1965) – Officer
- The Ipcress File (1965) – Colonel Ross
- Thunderball (1965) – Count Lippe
- The Idol (1966) – Martin Livesey
- The Power Game (1966, TV Series) – Stephen Gray
- Funeral in Berlin (1966) – Colonel Ross
- The Deadly Bees (1967) – Ralph Hargrove
- The Prisoner (1967, Episode: "Arrival") – Number Two
- Thirty-Minute Theatre (1967, Episode: "The Tape Recorder")
- Billion Dollar Brain (1967) – Colonel Ross
- A Twist of Sand (1968) – Patrol Boat Commander
- Strange Report (1969, TV Series) – Glyn Crowley
- Chilling (1974)
- The Six Million Dollar Man (1977, TV Series) – Henry Bulman
- Enigma (1977) – Maurice Mockcastle
- The Greatest Battle (1978) – General Whitmore
- A Dangerous Summer (1981) – Julian Fane
- Early Frost (1982) – Mike Hayes
- Goodbye Paradise (1983) – Quiney
- Matt Houston (1984, TV Series) – Richard / Rudy Bezmer (Episode: Eyewitness)
- The Colbys (1986, TV Series) – Peter Hackford
- The Shiralee (1987)
- Hell Raiders (1988)
- Tagget (1991, TV Movie) – Commander Arthur Green
- Murder, She Wrote (1992, TV Series) – Corsair (final appearance)

== Theatre credits ==
- Little Lambs Eat Ivy, Minerva Theatre, Kings Cross, NSW, May 1949
- Edward, My Son, Theatre Royal, Sydney, NSW, 16 September 1949
- All for Mary national tour 1956-57
- The Piccadilly Bushman national tour Sept 1959 – Feb 1960

== Select radio credits ==
- The Coward (1952)
- Chips (1954)
- The Orchard Walls (1954)
