= Bud Tingwell =

Australian actor (1923–2009)

Bud Tingwell AM
- Tingwell in Murder Ahoy! (1964)
- Born: Charles William Tingwell; 3 January 1923; Coogee, New South Wales, Australia
- Died: 15 May 2009 (aged 86); Melbourne, Victoria, Australia
- Education: Sydney Grammar School
- Occupations: Actor; radio announcer; pilot
- Years active: 1941–2008
- Spouse: Audrey May Wilson (m. 1951; died 1996)
- Children: 2
- Awards: Logie Hall of Fame Inductee (1994); Raymond Longford Award (1998); Australian Film Walk of Fame Inductee (2008)

Charles William Tingwell AM (3 January 1923 – 15 May 2009), known professionally as 'Bud' Tingwell or Charles 'Bud' Tingwell, was an Australian actor. One of the veterans of Australian film, he acted in his first motion picture in 1946 and went on to appear in more than 100 films and numerous TV programs in both the United Kingdom and Australia.

== Early life and military service ==
Tingwell was born on 3 January 1923 in the Sydney suburb of Coogee, the son of William Harvey Tingwell and Enid (née Green). William volunteered as a surf lifesaver at Coogee Surf Life Saving Club where, in 1922, a colleague noticed Enid's pregnancy and asked, 'What's budding there?', and 'Bud' became the nickname for their infant son. As an adolescent, Bud was encouraged by his father to train as an accountant, but Tingwell failed the entrance exam.

While still at school, he became a cadet at Sydney radio station 2CH, soon becoming the youngest radio announcer in Australia.

=== Second World War ===
In 1941, aged 18, Tingwell volunteered for war service overseas with the Royal Australian Air Force. Under the British Commonwealth Air Training Plan, personnel from Commonwealth air forces formed part of a joint training and assignment system. Consequently, Tingwell trained as a pilot in Canada during 1942. Despite damaging a Harvard training aircraft in August, he later qualified as a pilot and was commissioned as a pilot officer that December. He was posted to the Mediterranean Theatre and underwent operational training with No. 74 Operational Training Unit RAF, in British Palestine, and qualified to fly the Hawker Hurricane and Supermarine Spitfire.

It was just that you didn't not try to go, you know [...] You were so, I suppose, orientated towards the fact that the war's on and this is the right thing to do. We also did know quite a lot, a lot more than people realise I think, that difficult things were happening in Europe [...] We had Jewish friends who had rellies who had an awful time and we knew that was happening and refugees were arriving in Australia in the pre-war time. [...] We had German family next door and they had a son-in-law who wouldn't not say – he was a suspect, possible Nazi sympathiser, so he had to go inside somewhere. And Hitler, we knew a lot about Hitler and about Mussolini.

— Tingwell discussing his reasons for going to war (2002)

In January 1944, he was posted to No. 680 Squadron RAF, a photo reconnaissance unit, and flew 75 sorties in Mosquitos and Spitfires during the Italian campaign. Other aircraft that Tingwell was qualified to fly included the Bristol Blenheim, Martin Baltimore, Bristol Beaufighter and Airspeed Oxford. He was promoted to flying officer in June 1943 and flight lieutenant in December 1944.

Towards the end of the war, Tingwell was transferred back to Australia. He was posted to No. 5 Operational Training Unit RAAF as a flying instructor in June 1945, and then in December 1945, after the war had ended, he was posted to No. 87 Squadron RAAF, flying photo-reconnaissance Mosquitoes, until his demobilisation in March 1946.

Tingwell's war service earned him the 1939–45 Star, Italy Star, Defence Medal, War Medal 1939–1945, and Australia Service Medal 1939–1945. He remained a reservist into the 1950s.

== Post-war life and acting career ==
=== Australia ===
After returning to Australia, Tingwell married his childhood sweetheart, Audrey May Wilson. They were to have two children, Christopher and Virginia.

He joined Doris Fitton's Independent Theatre company and appeared on stage from the mid-1940s in such classics as The Little Foxes by Lillian Hellman and Jean Giraudoux's The Madwoman of Chaillot

In 1946, Tingwell was given his first film role, in Smithy, cast as an RAAF control tower officer – winning the role since he could supply his own RAAF uniform. He made his leading role debut in Always Another Dawn. Filmink wrote Tingwell "was relatively green at the time, but even at this stage was an ideal leading man – handsome, good voice and posture, all that stuff. If he’d gone to Britain straight after this film, we think he would’ve become a movie star."

Tingwell had an excellent supporting role in Bitter Springs (1950), made by Ealing Studios with Chips Rafferty; Tingwell played Rafferty's bigoted son. He had a similar role in Kangaroo (1952), a Hollywood-financed film shot in Australia for 20th Century Fox. He then appeared in I Found Joe Barton (1952), the first TV show filmed in Australia.

Fox liked Tingwell's work in Kangaroo and invited him to Los Angeles to play the role of Lt. Harry Carstairs in The Desert Rats, in which he appeared opposite Chips Rafferty, James Mason and Richard Burton. They offered him a long-term contract but Tingwell turned it down because he wanted to return to Australia.

Tingwell played the lead in King of the Coral Sea (1954) alongside Rafferty. In 1954, he co-starred with Gordon Chater in Top of the Bill, the first of the famous satirical revues staged at Sydney's Phillip Street Theatre.

=== UK career ===
The Australian film and radio industries slumped with the advent of television and Tingwell decided to move to the UK. He used the opportunity of a role in Ealing's The Shiralee (1957), which was filmed in Australia and London. Tingwell travelled to England to complete his scenes and decided to stay.

The following year, he took on his first recurring television role, as Australian surgeon Alan Dawson in the live TV serial Emergency Ward 10 and its film spin-off Life in Emergency Ward 10 (1959).

He had small roles in Ealing's Dunkirk (1958), then Bobbikins (1959), Cone of Silence (1960), and Tarzan the Magnificent (1960).

Tingwell played the role of Inspector Craddock in all four films of the Miss Marple series, starring Margaret Rutherford, from 1961 to 1964: Murder, She Said (1961), Murder at the Gallop (1963), Murder Most Foul (1964) and Murder Ahoy! (1964). For Hammer Films he appeared in The Secret of Blood Island (1964) and Dracula: Prince of Darkness (1966).

He had the lead in a TV series An Enemy of the State (1965). He also appeared in various episodes of the popular crime series Dangerman during this period.

In the late 1960s, he performed various minor voice roles for the Gerry Anderson "Supermarionation" TV series Thunderbirds and Captain Scarlet and the Mysterons, besides appearing in the first series of Catweazle.

In 1969 until the end of the play's run, he appeared as Robert Danvers in the long running farce There's a Girl in My Soup at the Comedy Theatre, London.

He was the recurring character of motel manager Kevin McArthur in Crossroads in the late 1960s and early 1970s. (Vincent Ball played McArthur in 1970–1973). He had a small role in Nobody Runs Forever (1968) with Rod Taylor.

=== Return to Australia ===
Tingwell appeared in many other films during his time in Britain, spending a total of 16 years as a "London Aussie". In 1973, he returned to Australia with his wife and children, and shortly after won the role of Inspector Reg Lawson in the long-running TV series Homicide. This was followed by small roles in a number of major Australian films, such as Breaker Morant (1980), Puberty Blues (1981) and All the Rivers Run (1983). He also played the recurring role of farmer Ted Campbell in the soap A Country Practice in the late 1980s and early 1990s and as the Narrator from The Flying Scotsman in Australia

=== Revival in popularity ===
Tingwell's career went through a quiet period during the late 1980s and early 1990s, until he took on the role of 'Gramps' in "Charlie the Wonderdog", a recurring segment on The Late Show, in 1993. His role in The Late Show was later to win him a major role as lawyer Lawrence Hammill in the film The Castle (1997). He later stated that this role helped him to recover from the death of his wife the previous year.

After the success of The Castle, Tingwell's career underwent a revival during the late 1990s and early 2000s. This saw him take on small roles in the commercial films The Craic (1999) and The Dish (2000), and in the TV mini-series Changi, as well as the lead role in the romantic drama film Innocence (2000). He would also appear on sketch show Totally Full Frontal, playing himself, as well as a recurring guest role in the soap opera Neighbours from 2000 to 2003, playing Henry O'Rourke. He had previously appeared in the soap in 1993 as Bert Willis. He appeared as John Conroy in the musical theatre production The Man from Snowy River: Arena Spectacular, which toured Australian capital cities twice during 2002.

In 2004, Tingwell published a memoir, Bud: A Life. In 2006, he launched his own website, which attracted 500 registered users in just over a week. On 5 October that year, he created his first blog post. He continued to act regularly until his death, in a number of films and TV programmes including eight episodes of Bed of Roses that aired in 2010. Among his last appearances, he hosted both Celebrity Circus and 20 to 1 and appeared on a celebrity special of Temptation with his daughter, Virginia.

== Accolades ==
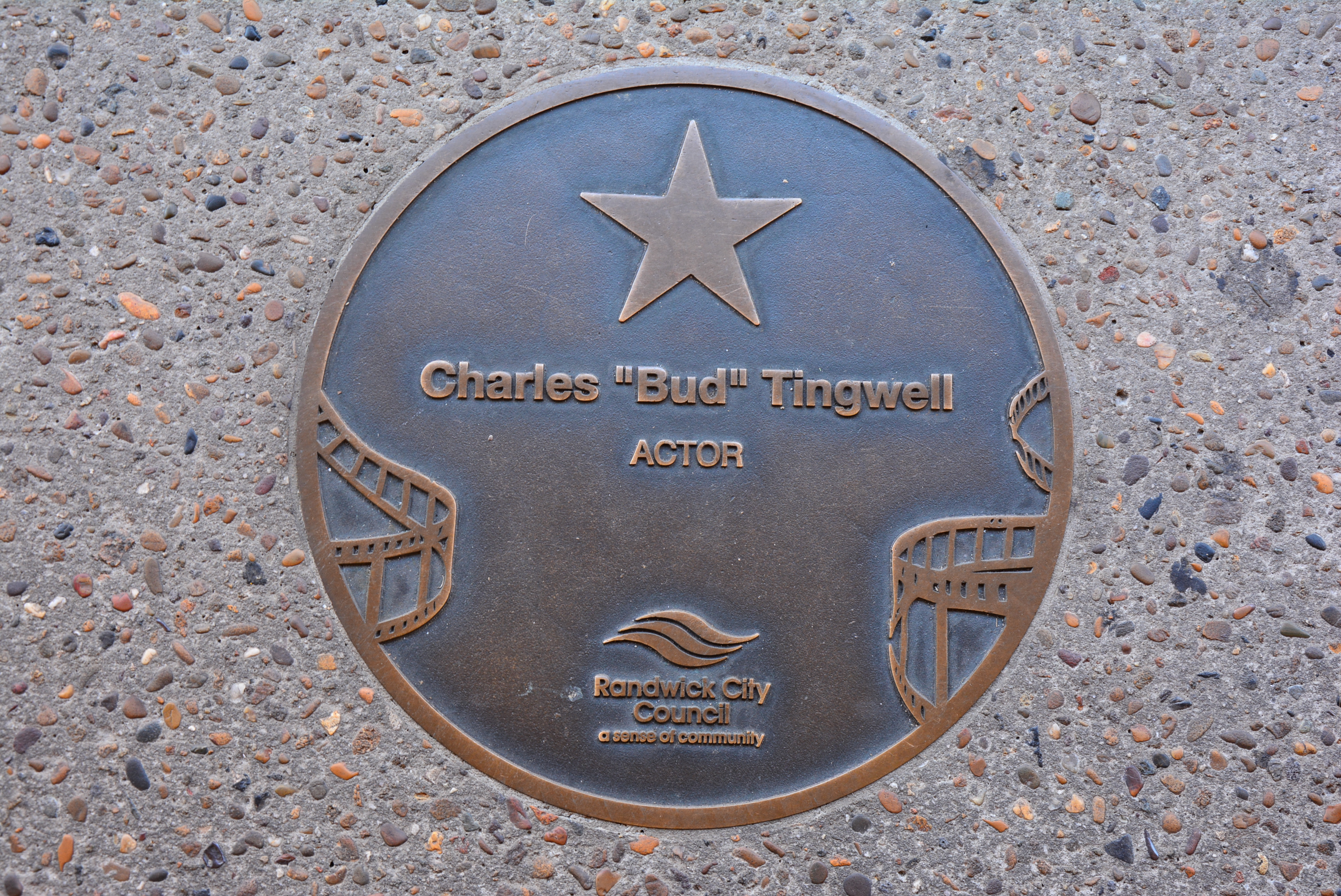
Tingwell's plaque at the Australian Film Walk of Fame, the Ritz Cinema, Randwick, Sydney

Tingwell was inducted into the Logie Hall of Fame in 1994. In 2008, he was inducted into Australian Film Walk of Fame in honour of his career and achievements in film and television.

Tingwell was appointed a Member of the Order of Australia in the Queen's Birthday Honours of June 1999.

=== Honours, awards and nominations ===
Year	Work	Award	Category	Result
1939–1945	Charles Tingwell	1939–1945 Star	Service during World War II	Honoured
1945	Charles Tingwell	Italy Star	Service in the Italian Campaign during World War II	Honoured
1945	Charles Tingwell	Defence Medal	Service during World War II: Non-operational Military Service and Certain Types of Civilian War Service	Honoured
1945	Charles Tingwell	War Medal 1939–1945	Service for at least 28 Days during World War II	Honoured
1949	Charles Tingwell	Australia Service Medal 1939–1945	Service in the Australian Armed Forces and Volunteer Defence Corps during World War II	Honoured
1980	Breaker Morant	Australian Film Institute Awards	Best Actor in a Supporting Role	Nominated
1994	Charles Tingwell	Logie Awards	Logie Hall of Fame Inductee	Honoured
1997	The Castle	Australian Film Institute Awards	Best Actor in a Supporting Role	Nominated
1998	The Castle	FCCA Awards	Best Male Supporting Actor	Nominated
1998	Charles Tingwell	Australian Film Institute Awards	Raymond Longford Award for Excellence in Film and Television	Won
1999	Charles Tingwell	Queen's Birthday Honours	Member of the Order of Australia	Honoured
2002	Changi	Logie Awards	Silver Logie for Most Outstanding Actor	Nominated
2008	Charles Tingwell	Australian Film Walk of Fame	Achievements in Film and Television	Honoured
2011	Bed of Roses	Equity Ensemble Awards	Outstanding Performance by an Ensemble in a Drama Series	Nominated

== Death ==
Audrey Tingwell died in 1996. Bud Tingwell died in Epworth Hospital in Melbourne, thirteen years later, after a long battle with prostate cancer, on 15 May 2009. He was 86. He was given a state funeral, which was held at St Paul's Cathedral, Melbourne, on 20 May.

== Filmography ==
=== Film ===
Year	Title	Role	Notes
1939	Come Up Smiling	Man in Crowd (uncredited)	Feature film
1946	Smithy	Control Tower Officer (uncredited)	Feature film
1948	Always Another Dawn	Terry Regan	Feature film
1949	Into the Straight	Sam Curzon	Feature film
1950	Bitter Springs	John King	Feature film
1951	The Glenrowan Affair	Narrator (voice)	Feature film
1952	Kangaroo (aka The Australian Story)	Matt	Feature film
1952	Captain Thunderbolt	Alan Blake	Feature film
1952	I Found Joe Barton	Al Munch	Short film
1953	The Desert Rats	Lieutenant Harry Carstairs	Feature film
1953	King of the Coral Sea	Peter Merriman	Feature film
1956	Smiley	Mr Stevens	Feature film
1957	The Shiralee	Jim Muldoon	Feature film
1957	A Santa for Christmas		TV movie
1958	Dunkirk	Sergeant in Cookhouse (uncredited)	Feature film
1959	Life in Emergency Ward 10	Dr. Alan Dawson	Feature film
1959	Bobbikins	Luke Parker	Feature film
1960	Cone of Silence (aka Trouble in the Sky)	Captain Braddock	Feature film
1960	Tarzan the Magnificent	Conway	Feature film
1961	Murder, She Said	Inspector Craddock	Feature film
1963	Murder at the Gallop	Inspector Craddock	Feature film
1964	Murder Most Foul	Inspector Craddock	Feature film
1964	Murder Ahoy!	Chief Inspector Craddock	Feature film
1965	The Secret of Blood Island	Major Dryden	Feature film
1966	Dracula: Prince of Darkness	Alan Kent	Feature film
1966	Thunderbirds Are Go	Dr. Tony Grant / Angry Young Man (voice)	Feature film
1968	Nobody Runs Forever	Jacko	Feature film
1973	Land of the Sleeping Giant: A History of the Yalumba Wines Estate of the Barossa Valley	Narrator (voice)	Short film
1974	Petersen	Reverend Petersen (Father)	Feature film
1976	End Play	Dr. Fairburn	Feature film
1976	Is There Anybody There?	Redwood	TV movie
1976	Eliza Fraser	Duncan Fraser	Feature film
1977	Summerfield	Dr. Miller	Feature film
1978	Gone to Ground	Harry Ferguson	TV movie
1978	Money Movers	Jack Henderson	Feature film
1979	The Journalist	Sid Mitchell	Feature film
1980	Breaker Morant	Lt. Colonel Denny	Feature film
1981	Puberty Blues	The Headmaster	Feature film
1982	Freedom	Cassidy	Feature film
1984	Banjo's Australia	Narrator	Video
1984	My First Wife	Helen's Father	Feature film
1984	Annie's Coming Out	Judge	Feature film
1986	Handle with Care	Doctor	TV movie
1986	Malcolm	Tram Depot Supervisor	Feature film
1986	Windrider	Stewart Simpson Senior	Feature film
1987	Bushfire Moon	Max Bell	Feature film
1988	Tudawali	Dr Rayment	TV movie
1988	Evil Angels (aka A Cry in the Dark)	Justice James Muirhead	Feature film
1988	The Four Minute Mile	Sandy Duncan	TV movie
1990	Great National Parks of Australia	Narrator	Documentary film
1992	The Flying Scotsman in Australia	Narrator	
1993	Shotgun Wedding	Gary Judge (voice)	Feature film
1994	Economy Class	Mr Chambers	TV movie
1994	Niagara's Gold	James Herd	Documentary film
1995	The Last Bullet	Old Stanley	TV movie
1997	The Castle	Lawrence Hammill QC	Feature film
1997	Amy	Country Doctor	Feature film
1998	Tulip	Will	Short film
1999	The Craic	Farmer	Feature film
1999	Sweet Coincidence		Short film
2000	The Wog Boy	Mr. Walker	Feature film
2000	On the Beach	Professor Alan Nordstrum	TV movie
2000	Innocence	Andreas Borg	Feature film
2000	The Dish	Reverend Loftus	Feature film
2001	WillFull	Martin	Feature film
2001	The Inside Story	Edward Brooks	Feature film
2002	The Story of Ned Kelly	Narrator (voice)	Documentary film
2003	Ned Kelly in Popular Culture	Narrator (voice)	Documentary film
2003	The Man from Snowy River: Arena Spectacular	John Conroy	TV movie
2003	Ned Kelly	Premier Graham Berry	Feature film
2004	Human Touch	Anna's stepfather	Feature film
2005	Fritz Gets Rich	Fritz (voice)	Short film
2005	Laughing Stock	Grandad	
2006	Hunt Angels	Self	Docudrama film
2006	...But a Giant Leap for Mr. Larkin	Mr Larkin	Short film
2006	Irresistible	Sam	Feature film
2006	Jindabyne	Minister	Feature film
2006	Hidden Creatures	Bill	Short film
2006	Miscommunication	Marriage Counsellor	Short film
2007	Let Me Not	Lionel	Feature film
2008	Mr Bear & Mr Rabbit	Bob	Short film
2008	Professor Pebbles	Pope (voice)	Short film
2008	Dearest Sir	Oliver	Short film
2008	Three Blind Mice	Bob Fisher	Feature film
2008	Salvation	Gallery Visitor	Feature film
2008	Menzies and Churchill at War	Sir Winston Churchill	TV documentary movie
2009	Remembering Nigel	Himself	Feature film
2010	The Last Bottle	Alistair	Short film

=== Television ===
Year	Title	Role	Type
1956	Studio 57	Alan Caldwell	Season 3, episode 10: "Mr. Cinderella"
1957–1962	Emergency Ward 10	Dr. Alan Dawson	331 episodes
1961	Theatre 70	Le Strange	Season 1, episode 20: "The Watchmen of Saul"
1963	Crane	Albert Ringwood	Season 1, episode 2: "Bad Company"
1963	ITV Play of the Week		Season 9, episode 8: "Stella"
1963; 1967	The Avengers	Mike Venner / Dr. Neville	2 episodes
1964	Beware of the Dog	John Woodley	6 episodes
1965	Danger Man	Kemp	Season 1, episode 17: "The Affair at Castelevara"
1965	ITV Sunday Night Drama	Donald Wedderburn	Episode: "Suspense Hour: Nightmare on Instalments"
1965	Love Story	Professor Bellamy	Season 3, episode 13: "Girl on the Cliff"
1965	An Enemy of the State	Harry Sutton	6 episodes
1965–1969	Out of the Unknown	Mark Blaine / Captain Dantor / Captain Jaffe	3 episodes
1966	The Man in Room 17	Major David Winton	Season 2, episode 11: "The Standard"
1966	Knock on Any Door	Bill Anderson	Season 2, episode 10: "White Rhino"
1966	Adam Adamant Lives!	Benjamin Kinthley	Season 1, episode 4: "The Sweet Smell of Disaster"
1966	BBC Play of the Month	Johnson	Season 2, episode 1: "Defection! The Case of Colonel Petrov"
1966	Thunderbirds	Various characters (voices)	Season 2, 3 episodes
1966–1969	The Troubleshooters	Matthew Baber / Blue Hughes	2 episodes
1967	Uncle Charles		Episode 4: "Bars of the Cage"
1967	Mickey Dunne	Max	Season 1, episode 2: "If Anyone Calls - I'm in the Doghouse"
1967	The Revenue Men	Pringle	Season 2, episode 4: "Who Needs Friends?"
1967	The Gamblers	Walters	Season 1, episode 4: "When the Chips Are Down"
1967–1968	Captain Scarlet and the Mysterons	Doctor Fawn / various characters (voices)	29 episodes
1968	A Man of Our Times	David Soames	5 episodes
1968	Z-Cars	Arthur Cranley	Season 6, 2 episodes
1968	Detective	Pederson	Season 2, episode 4: "Lesson in Anatomy"
1968	Sherlock Holmes	Carruthers	Season 2, episode 14: "The Solitary Cyclist"
1969	ITV Playhouse	Major George Fitzallan	Season 2, episode 36: "The Marrying Kind"
1970	Catweazle	Mr. Bennet	Season 1, 13 episodes
1970	The Wednesday Play	John Mitchell	Season 9, episode 25: "Chariot of Fire"
1970	UFO	Beaver James	Season 1, episode 14: "Mindbender"
1972	Father, Dear Father	Mr Welsh	Season 6, episode 1: "The Cardboard Casanova"
1972	The Man from Haven	Bank Manager	Episode 1
1972	Behind the Legend	Arthur Phillip	Season 1, episode 13: "Arthur Phillip"
1973	Division 4	Detective Sergeant John Smith	Season 5, episode 2: "Big Bad John"
1973	Boney	Jeff Stanton	Season 2, episode 4: "Boney and the Powder Trail"
1973	Certain Women	Duncan	Season 1, episode 1: "Freda"
1973	The Bellcrest Story	Sam Urwin	5 episodes
1973–1976	Homicide	Inspector Reg Lawson	Seasons 10–13, 126 episodes
1976	Power Without Glory	Kenneth Murkett	Miniseries, season 1, episode 18: "Rough and Tumble"
1976	Bellbird	Paul Hadfield	Episode 1525
1977–1982	The Sullivans	Dr. Hammond / Doctor / Quiz Host / Voice of Priest	9 episodes
1978	Case for the Defence	George McGee	Episode 2: "The Killing of Toby McGee"
1978	Run From the Morning	Vic Hennessy	6 episodes
1978	Father, Dear Father in Australia	Dr Baker	Episode 10: "Father Dear Father's Day"
1978–1980	Cop Shop	Supt. Keith York / George Connolly / Graham Horner	5 episodes
1979	Skyways	Harold Forbes	4 episodes
1980	Lawson's Mates		Episode 5: "Tommy"
1983	The Coral Island	Sir Charles Rover	Miniseries, episode 1
1983	All the Rivers Run	Uncle Charles	Miniseries, 6 episodes
1983	Carson's Law	Judge Warren / Brigadier Rattigan	5 episodes
1985	The Flying Doctors	Oscar (voice)	Miniseries, episode 3
1985	Anzacs	Narrator	Miniseries, 1 episode: "The Making of ANZACS"
1985; 1986	Prisoner (a.k.a. Prisoner: Cell Block H)	Dr. Massey / Mr. Hudson	5 episodes
1986	The Lancaster Miller Affair	Sam Hayes	Miniseries, 3 episodes
1986	My Brother Tom	Justice Masters	Miniseries, episode 2
1986	The Fast Lane	Bertie	Season 2, episode 5: "Murder Most Fouled"
1987	The Far Country	Dr Morton	Miniseries, 2 episodes
1987	The Harp in the South	Father Cooley	Miniseries, 3 episodes
1987	Poor Man's Orange	Father Cooley	Miniseries, 3 episodes
1988	House Rules	Clarrie O'Donnell	Episode 1
1989	The Magistrate	Prologue Narrator	Miniseries, 2 episodes
1989	All the Rivers Run 2	Uncle Charles	Miniseries, 2 episodes
1990	Flair	Bert Clarke	Miniseries, 2 episodes
1990	G.P.	Doug	Season 2, episode 37: "Longing"
1990–1991	The Flying Doctors	Hughie Geddes / Felix	2 episodes
1991	Boys from the Bush	Graham	Season 1, episode 8: "Mateship"
1991	Pugwall	Terrence Humble	Season 2, episode 20: "Mr Humble"
1991	Golden Fiddles	Narrator	2 episodes
1992	Acropolis Now	Customer	Season 5, episode 12: "Here Come the Brides: Part One"
1993	The Late Show	Gramps in "Charlie the Wonder Dog" & "A Very Charlie Christmas" segments	7 episodes
1993	A Country Practice	Santa Claus / Edward Seldon	2 episodes
1993; 2000; 2003	Neighbours	Henry O'Rourke / Bert Willis	17 episodes
1994	Mother and Son	The Judge	Season 6, episode 5: "The Lamingtons"
1994	Ocean Girl	Mr Carmody	Season 1, episode 7: "Toxic Waste"
1994	Snowy River: The McGregor Saga	Governor	Season 1, episode 12: "Love Finds a Way"
1994	Wedlocked		Episode 10: "Dating Game"
1994; 2004	Blue Heelers	Charles Shaw / Hayes	2 episodes
1995	Home and Away	Dr Gordon	8 episodes
1998	All Saints	Dr Harry Mackay	Season 1, episode 39: "Moment of Truth"
1998	The Violent Earth	Bishop Guiart	Miniseries, 3 episodes
1998	The Silver Brumby	Benni / Narrator (voice)	Animated series, season 3, episode 12: "Getting Together"
1999	Totally Full Frontal	Various characters	13 episodes
1999	Chuck Finn	Old Snowy	Season 1, episode 10: "Finn P.I. & Associates"
2000	Round the Twist	Derek	Season 3, episode 10: "The Tears of Innocence"
2001	The Secret Life of Us	Cyril	Season 1, episode 14: "Better the Devil You Know"
2001	Changi	Older David Collins	Miniseries, 2 episodes
2001–2002	Something in the Air	William Brown	7 episodes
2003	Legacy of the Silver Shadow	Billings	Episode 9: "Teenage Sidekicks"
2005	Scooter: Secret Agent	Lawrence Clemments	Episode 22: "Operation: Senior Citizen"
2005	Celebrity Circus	Host	
2005–2009	20 to One	Host	18 episodes
2010	Bed of Roses	Sandy Wilsoncroft	8 episodes

== Radio (partial) ==
Year	Title	Role	Station	Ref.
c.1939	2CH, Sydney	Cadet Announcer	2CH, Sydney	
1939	Billy Bunter of Greyfriars	Bob Cherry	Radio serial	
1947	Great Expectations	Pip	Lux Radio Theatre radio play	
1948	Hagen's Circus	David Hagen	Radio serial on 2UE	
1950	Larry Kent: I Hate Crime		Radio show on 2UE	
1950	The Frank Scranton Murder		"Larry Kent: I Hate Crime" radio play on 2UE	
1950	They Gave Him a Gun		Radio serial with 2UW	
1950	Lady in Distress		Grace Gibson Productions radio serial	
1951	Hart of the Territory	Gil Hart	Radio serial on 2GB	
1951	The Harp in the South	Narrator	Radio serial on 2UW	
1951	A Dog's Life		Radio serial on ABC Radio	
1952	Chips		Radio serial on 2UE	
1952	Colgate Palmolive's Strike it Rich	Assistant compère / announcer	Game show on 2UE, 4BK-AK, 3SR & 3DB	
1952	Phantom Ranger	Phantom Ranger	Radio serial on 2UW	
1952	Night Was Our Friend	Martin	General Motors Hour radio play on 2GB & 4BH	
1952–1955	The Adventures of Jindawarrabel	Sergeant Bob Keane	Radio serial (later became The Adventures of Smoky Dawson)	
1953	Cop the Lot	Assistant compère / announcer	Game show on 2UE & 4BK-AK	
c.1953–1962	Kellogg's Wild West Club	Local policeman (regular role)		
1954	The Dam Busters	Guy Gibson VC	Radio serial	
1954	The Great Escape		Radio serial on 2UE & 3DB	
1954	Silver Ridge	Bruce Conway	Radio serial on 2FC	
1954	Dick Tracy		Grace Gibson Productions radio serial on 2UW	
1954	Wings Off the Sea		Radio serial on 2FC-2NA	
1954	The Fat Man		Radio serial on 2UW, episodes 1–7	
1954	Gimme the Boats		Radio serial on 4EC	
1954	It Remains to Be Seen		General Motors Hour radio play	
1954	Western Trail	Wolf Castella	Radio serial on 2GB	
1954–1955	The Adventures of Ellery Queen	Ellery Queen	Grace Gibson Productions radio serial on 2UE, 4BK-AK and 2KO, 2GZ & 2NZ	
1954–1955	Deadline (aka Deadline for Danger)		Radio serial on 3XY, episodes: "The Voice", "Leap in the Dark"	
1955	Friday the 13th		"Harry Dearth's Playhouse" radio serial on 2GB & 4BH	
1955; 1956	The Clock	Bud / Howard Williams / Len / John / Joe	Grace Gibson Productions radio serial, episode 9: "The Hunter and the Hunted", episode 10: "The Helping Hand", episode 15: "The Hitchhiker", episode 17: "Time in Reverse", episode 20: "Pretty Cousin Amy"	
1956	Tension (Suspense)		Grace Gibson Productions radio serial, episode 1: "Remember Me"	
1956	Tarzan	Tarzan	Grace Gibson Productions radio serial on 2GB	
1956	Blind Justice		Radio serial	
Undated	Martin's Corner		Radio serial on 2UW	
Undated	Doctor Paul		Grace Gibson Productions radio serial on 2UW	
Undated	When a Girl Marries		Radio serial on 2CH & 2KO	
Undated	Pick a Box	Assistant compère / announcer	Game show on 2GB	
Undated	It Pays to Be Funny	Assistant compère / announcer	Variety show	
Undated	Blue Hills		Radio serial on ABC Radio	
Undated	Starlight Theatre		Grace Gibson Productions radio serial	
Undated	Lux Radio Theatre		Radio show on 2GB, 2UW, 2UE & 2KO	
Undated	The Rola Show		Radio show on 2UE	
Undated	Caltex Theatre		Radio show on 2GB	
Undated	General Motors Hour		Radio show on 2GB	
Undated	Harry Dearth's Theatre		Radio show	
Undated	Harry Dearth's Playhouse		Radio show on 2UW	
Undated	Kool Mint Playhouse		Radio show	

== Theatre ==
=== As actor ===
Year	Title	Role	Venue / Co.	Ref.
1947	The Little Foxes		Independent Theatre, Sydney	
1950	La Parisienne		Independent Theatre, Sydney	
1950	Home of the Brave	Sergeant Mingo	Independent Theatre, Sydney	
1950	The Madwoman of Chaillot		Independent Theatre, Sydney	
1954	Hit and Run		Phillip St Theatre, Sydney	
1954; 1955	Top of the Bill		Phillip St Theatre, Sydney	
1955	Highlights of the Footlights		Theatre Royal Sydney	
1955; 1956	Simon and Laura	David Prentice	Australia & New Zealand tour with J. C. Williamson's	
1955; 1956	The Deep Blue Sea		Australia & New Zealand tour with J. C. Williamson's	
1963	Person Unknown	Detective Inspector Ian Conway	Pavilion Theatre, Bournemouth	
1964	See How They Run	Reverend Lionel Toop	UK tour	
1966	Who's Afraid of Virginia Woolf?	George	Birmingham Repertory Theatre	
1966–1972	There's a Girl in My Soup	Robert Danvers (replacement)	UK tour	
1967	Five, Four, Three, Two, One	Jeremy Brown	Golders Green Hippodrome, London	
1967–1968	Say Who You Are		Bristol Hippodrome	
1968	Candida	Morrell	Yvonne Arnaud Theatre, Guildford	
1971	The Caine Mutiny Court Marshall	Queeg	Thorndike Theatre, Surrey	
1974	Doctor in the House		UK tour	
1977	The Pleasure of His Company		Comedy Theatre, Melbourne with J. C. Williamson	
1979	Dirty Linen	Withenshaw, M.P. (the Chairman)	Playbox Theatre, Melbourne with Hoopla Theatre Foundation	
1979	No Man’s Land	Spooner	Playbox Theatre, Melbourne with Hoopla Theatre Foundation	
1980	Comedians	Eddie	Playbox Theatre, Melbourne with Hoopla Theatre Foundation	
1980	A Doll’s House	Dr Rank	Melbourne Athenaeum with MTC	
1980	The Matchmaker	Horace Vandergelder	Melbourne Athenaeum with MTC	
1981	Every Good Boy Deserves Favour	Doctor	Dallas Brooks Hall, Melbourne with Playbox	
1984	Pack of Lies	Stewart	Russell St Theatre, Melbourne with MTC	
1987	The Impostor	The Plant / Venerable Comrade Zhang	St Martins Youth Arts Centre, Melbourne with Playbox	
1990	Cat on a Hot Tin Roof	Big Daddy	Playhouse, Melbourne with MTC	
1994	Cosi	Henry	Russell St Theatre, Melbourne with MTC	
1995	Paradise Lost		St George's Cathedral, Perth	
1995	Flame of Freedom – Australia Remembers		Brisbane Entertainment Centre	
1998	The Herbal Bed	Bishop Parry of Worcester	Fairfax Studio, Melbourne with MTC	
2000	Travelling North		University of Sydney with Ensemble Theatre	
2000–2004	The Carer	George Parker	Australian tour	
2002	The Man From Snowy River Arena Spectacular	John Conroy	Australian tour	
2005	The Q Story		Q Theatre, Penrith with Railway St Theatre Company	
2006	An Audience with Charles 'Bud' Tingwell	Himself	Theatre Royal, Hobart	
2007	Scenes from Collits' Inn	Narrator	Army Drill Hall, Melbourne	
2007	Metaphysical	Reader (poetry)	Sixteenth Castlemaine State Festival, Castlemaine Art Museum	
2008	Follies	Dimitri Weisman	State Theatre, Melbourne with The Production Company	

=== As writer / director ===
Year	Title	Role	Venue / Co.	Ref.
1967	Five, Four, Three, Two, One	Playwright	Golders Green Hippodrome, London	
1974	Doctor in the House	Director	Australian tour & Blackpool, UK	
	The Collector	Director	King's Head Theatre, London	
1980	Quadraphrenia	Director	Playbox Theatre, Melbourne with Hoopla Theatre Foundation	

== Discography ==
=== Charting singles ===
List of singles, with selected chart positions
Year	Title	Peak chart positions	Album
Year	Title	AUS	Album
1981	"The Breaker" (with John Williamson)	100	True Blue – The Very Best of John Williamson

== Publications ==
Year	Title	Type	Publisher
2004	"Bud: A Life"	Memoir	Macmillan Publishers
2009	"Charles ‘Bud’ Tingwell’s War Stories – The heroes, the battles, the tragedies and triumphs of WW2"	Memoir	Wilkinson Publishing
