= List of Australian films of the 1940s =

This is a list of Australian films of the 1940s. For a complete alphabetical list, see Category:Australian films.

== 1940s ==
Title	Director	Cast	Genre	Notes
1940
Ants in His Pants	William Freshman	Will Mahoney, Ann Richards	Comedy/Musical	
Dad Rudd, M.P.	Ken G. Hall	Bert Bailey, Connie Martyn	Comedy	
Forty Thousand Horsemen	Charles Chauvel	Harvey Adams, Betty Bryant	War	
Water Ballet: Sydney	?	Annette Kellerman	Short	
Wings of Destiny	Rupert Kathner	Marshall Crosby, John Fernside	Action drama	
1941
Advance to Libya	Frank Hurley		Documentary	
The Power and the Glory	Noel Monkman	Katrin Rosselle, Peter Finch	Drama / Thriller	Based on book of same title
Racing Luck	Rupert Kathner	Joe Valli, George Lloyd	Adventure comedy	
That Certain Something	Clarence G. Badger	Megan Edwards, Thelma Grigg	Drama	
Water Ballet	?	Annette Kellerman	Short	
1942
100,000 Cobbers	Ken G. Hall	Ron Randell, Ann Richards	Drama / Short	
Jewel of the Pacific	Frank Hurley	?	Short documentary	
Kokoda Front Line!	Damien Parer (camera)	Peter Bathurst, Damien Parer	War documentary	18 September First Australian film to win an Oscar (for Best Documentary Feature)
Men of Timor	?		Short documentary	
Moresby Under the Blitz	Ken G. Hall	?	War documentary	
Soldiers Without Uniforms	Charles Chauvel	?	Short documentary	
A Yank in Australia	Alfred J. Goulding	Al Thomas, Kitty Bluett	Comedy	
1943
Assault on Salamaua	?		Documentary	
The Bismarck Convoy Smashed		Peter Bathurst (voice)	War documentary	
1944
The Rats of Tobruk	Charles Chauvel	Grant Taylor, Peter Finch, Chips Rafferty	War / Drama	
Red Sky at Morning	Hartney J. Arthur	John Alden, Dorothea Dunstan, Peter Finch	Drama	
1945
Harvest Gold	Mervyn Murphy	Joe Valli, Harry Abdy	Drama	
Mid East	Frank Hurley		Documentary	
1946
A Son Is Born	Eric Porter	Muriel Steinbeck, Ron Randell, Peter Finch	Drama	
Indonesia Calling	Joris Ivens	Peter Finch	Short documentary	
The Overlanders	Harry Watt	Chips Rafferty, Daphne Campbell	Adventure	
Smithy	Ken G. Hall	Ron Randell	Biopic	
Walkabout	Charles Mountford		Short/Documentary	
1947
Bush Christmas	Ralph Smart	Chips Rafferty, Thelma Grigg	Adventure	
School in the Mailbox	Stanley Hawes		Short documentary	Nominated for Oscar
1948
Always Another Dawn	T. O. McCreadie	Guy Doleman, Queenie Ashton	War drama	
1949
The Inlanders	John Kingsford-Smith	David Low	Documentary	
Into the Straight	T. O. McCreadie	Margo Lee	Drama	
Sons of Matthew	Charles Chauvel	Michael Pate, John Ewart	Adventure / Drama	
Eureka Stockade	Harry Watt	Chips Rafferty, Peter Illing	Historical Drama	
Strong Is the Seed	Arthur Greville Collins	Queenie Ashton, Guy Doleman	Drama	

== See also ==
- 1940 in Australia
- 1941 in Australia
- 1942 in Australia
- 1943 in Australia
- 1944 in Australia
- 1945 in Australia
- 1946 in Australia
- 1947 in Australia
- 1948 in Australia
- 1949 in Australia
