= R.A.A.F. Eagles Over New Guinea =

R.A.A.F. Eagles over New Guinea
- Directed by: Ken G. Hall (uncredited)
- Produced by: Ken G. Hall (uncredited)
- Narrated by: Peter Bathurst
- Cinematography: Damien Parer
- Edited by: Terry Banks
- Production companies: Cinesound Productions; Department of Information
- Release date: April 1943
- Running time: 9 minutes
- Country: Australia
- Language: English

R.A.A.F. Eagles Over New Guinea is a 1943 Australian newsreel from Cinesound Productions focusing on the role of the Royal Australian Air Force (RAAF) during the New Guinea Campaign in World War II. It includes combat footage taken by Damien Parer.

A copy of the newsreel has survived but not with sound.
