= The Road to Kokoda =

Australian film (1942), of World War II in today's Papua New Guinea

- Cinematography: Damien Parer
- Production company: Movietone Productions
- Distributed by: 20th Century Fox
- Release date: September 18, 1942
- Running time: 9 minutes
- Country: Australia
- Language: English

The Road to Kokoda is a 1942 Australian documentary. Much of the footage shot by Australian war photographer Damien Parer (1912–1944) also appears in Kokoda Front Line!.

== Synopsis ==
The Kokoda Front Line! is an iconic and Academy Award-winning newsreel shot by Damien Parer which has some of the most iconic pictures of Australian troops. The Oscar, according to David O. Selznick in 1943, was won for 'effectiveness in depicting simply yet forcefully the scene of war in New Guinea and for its moving presentation of the bravery and fortitude of our Australian comrades in arms'. In the documentary film, Australian troops from the 39th Battalion are shown along the Kokoda Track walking through a mountainous terrain and across a river. The film through the utilisation of voice actor Peter Bathurst exemplifies the cruel conditions, the bravery of the troops, and the support and care displayed by the Papuans.

Footage of The Salvation Army includes a shot of Father Albert Moore lighting a cigarette of an injured soldier. The last series of shots in the film were captured from heightened positions along the track of the Papuan carrying wounded troops climbing through steep terrains in harsh conditions.

Parer's sheer fearlessness and devotion to his job played a crucial role in the production of Kokoda Front Line. The combat cameraman being made fully aware of the risk, Parer continued to film the campaign and routinely went to the frontline at Kokoda in order to fulfill his goal to present the true account of events as he saw them. The nature of the mountainous terrain significantly negatively impacted Parer's ability to shoot long sequences that didn't include close-ups of the soldiers standing or trudging through the thick mud along the track. This therefore led to the film being extremely difficult to film, and ultimately led to the death of Damien Parer.

== Physical impacts ==
In the Kokoda Track campaign, as shown in the film, the main impacts were disease and supply shortages. Parer through the use of close-ups and long shots captures the wounded and sick soldiers being carried on stretcher bearers and cared for by the Papuans. Prior to this, it was found Australian soldiers suffered more from illness than Japanese soldiers. The Japanese had previous exposure to this in November 1943 and came to the war prepared to combat disease in contrast to Australians. It was evident that in a study conducted by Australians that the Imperial Japanese Army were the 'most inoculated army in the world'. The advantage of inoculation played a pivotal role in the initial success of the Japanese in the war prevented diseases such as malaria and scrub typhus. This directly led to the evacuation of 1752 sick Australian soldiers in contrast to 343 sick Japanese soldiers.

The decisive moment in the war as depicted in the film was when Japanese casualties were higher than the Australian numbers. This can be directly attributed to supply problems. This is evident through the aerial footage of the thick jungle and vast green plains where supplies are being dropped off. The Australians found in prior operations in the Owen Stanley Range their supply system was inefficient. By trucking all supplies to the front line, 19 tons of supplies required for each 1000 Australian fighting men could be delivered daily. This led to aircraft shortages, and the daily requirement changed to 12 tons of supplies. This was the decisive point in the Kokoda Track campaign as the Japanese, mainly used a poor road system, budgeted six tons of supplies per thousand men per day. The advantage went to the Japanese as they focused on capturing enemy supplies and utilised simple items in food rations in contrast to the Australians, providing them a great advantage as the Australians were too dependent on the food rations.

== Environmental impacts ==
The environmental impact of the Kokoda Track played a pivotal role in the campaign and the number of casualties. Through the lugging of 35 mm camera and film stock, Parer would spend days perched in a tree in order to accurately capture the narrowness and steep inclines of the track. The aerial footage in the film glanced over the thick jungle over a mountainous terrain, characterised with deep slopes of green plains. The environment is not a healthy environment as soldiers travelled along the track, their health began to decline. Studies at the time concluded that three months in New Guinea directly led to an identifiable decrease in the effectiveness of a unit regardless of being in a battle or not. This can be attributed to the cruel conditions of the environment as the length of the track is 96 kilometres (60 mi) and the climate is characterised by year-round humid days with intense cold nights, torrential rainfall and an increase risk of tropical diseases such as malaria, this makes the track difficult as it is physically demanding.

As evident in Parer's footage of the flying aircraft and the Japanese troops along the road the effect of the environment directly impacted the supply line as neither side could maintain a supply line over its distance. The environment also provided problems for soldiers fighting in the jungles as the mountainous terrain, steep slopes and thick jungle interrupted communication. The visibility in the jungle as seen in the film is poor and gradually gets worse when there is fog and rain. This environment directly benefited the Japanese as shown in the film they used tactics of war as gun groups that usually had one group firing towards the enemy and another sweeping the enemy yet in the condition of the Kokoda Track unless the attacker had been fired on by the hidden enemy it was very hard to be aware of enemy presence.

The narrator in the film referred to the Japanese as 'masters of camouflage'; the camouflage and deception displayed by the Japanese played a pivotal role in the early advancements of the Japanese as the treacherous terrain and rainfall significantly impacted the visibility.

== Analysis ==
Kokoda Front Line! through Parer's cinematography of wounded soldiers and mountainous setting was able to emotionally capture the Australian audience. Parer's bravery through his determination to record the Australian troops heading towards battle played a pivotal role in portraying the emotional climax and the iconic moving images of Australians during the Second World War. As seen in the documentary there is a scene were a wounded soldier appears like a hero figure – with a damaged shirt and with his arms spread apart. Salvation Army officer Albert Moore offers him a cigarette. Cigarettes were used in the army as an antidepressant due to the traumatic events that soldiers experience during the war. The Salvation Army's refreshment centre was established on 6 September 1942 and chaplain Major Albert Moore, the centre was the main provider of beverages by producing an average of 204 litres (45 imp gal; 54 US gal) of coffee or hot tea. The film had soldiers captured in a cross-like figure which can be attributed to Parer's Catholic background which could have directly led to this imagery. The film did this in order to reassure their audience that God was protecting them as at the time Australia had a high Catholic background. In the news reel the troops are portrayed to be bold and courageous soldiers battling a ghost of an enemy.

In the newsreel there is also a distinct absence of the Japanese soldiers in the images and this is evident throughout the newsreel. This can be attributed to the tactical warfare established by the Japanese throughout the war. The narrator makes constant reference to the invisibility of the Japanese troops and this is due to the intelligence and deception levels. As the film was produced from an Australian perspective there is limited footage of Japanese soldiers, as in the film the only evidence of Japanese is masked behind the tropical terrain. Parer despite not utilising much footage of the Japanese troops managed to evoke an emotional drama that lies heavily on the depiction of the cruel conditions that the Australian troops had to overcome and the cunning narration.

A key part of the film was the role of Papua and New Guinea territories in its assistance to the Australian troops in succeeding in the war. In the newsreel the Papuan carriers are shown as kind and quiet people and contribute significantly to the footage in the film. In the narration Bathurst through colloquial language that at the time was acceptable states that, the Papuan carriers in their aid to the Australian troops are 'black skinned boys that are white'. This type of language will be recognised now as racist and discriminatory at the time was used to display the gratitude and respect they played in helping wounded Australian soldiers and educating the troops about the mountainous terrain and diseases.

== Influence of the film ==
Parer's footage of the Kokoda Track campaign accompanied with the commentary built the emotional drama to Australians the true realities of the war in the Pacific; in later trying to capture the cruel conditions of the war Parer died filming footage of the Australian troops at war on the island of Peleliu. Kokoda Front Line! was able to win the Oscar for the Best Documentary category in 1943 largely to Parer's film style as his ability to capture the everyday lives of troops anticipated the cinema-vérité style of the documentary. Jenifer Coombes, a film curator at the National Film and Sound Archive, said 'He liked the idea of introducing a dramatic element into the documentary by putting Damien into the role of narrator'.

Years after the film's release despite the Oscar been in a vault, the role of the Kokoda Front Line! on the Australian psyche remains. The film has been a constant reminder to Australians particularly on Anzac Day of the courage it took the soldiers to overcome the mountainous terrain and is often used as a reference point to remember the soldiers that have lost their lives. The high casualty rates of approximately 625 Australians and over 1600 wounded severely impacted many Australian troop family members. The war also had everlasting psychological effects were soldiers suffered from PTSD due to prolonged exposure to enemy fire.

The rhetorical style of the narration played a pivotal role in enhancing the Australian audience sense that Australia was in danger and through the capturing of the tropical landscape were able to come to the realisation that the soldiers at any moment could have been killed. The narration also provides a strong indicator that propaganda films can still be very emotionally scaring. The final image is emotionally moving and memorable. The film by capturing the soldiers with their ankles deep in mud portrays the 39th Battalion representing every Australian soldier playing the role for their country. The determination and talent portrayed by Parer through his shots composed with light on the soldiers face. There was a dispute between Ken Hall and Parer on who should narrate the film they held a briefing and decided Parer should speak on the film.

The Kokoda Front Line! also played a pivotal role in fostering positive relationships with today's Papua New Guinea, as Australia already had a relationship with the inhabitants. However, the kind acts of the Papuans and knowledge spread by them reassured Australians that in the event of jeopardy they would be there to help.

The film through the use of Parer's footage enhanced editing by Cinesound Review and the production used to produce the film.

== Featured cast ==
- Peter Bathurst, narrator
- Damien Parer (1912–1944), cinematographer
- Ken G. Hall (1901–1994), producer
- Terry Banks, film editing
- Clive Cross, sound department
