= The Inlanders =

- Directed by: John Kingsford-Smith
- Written by: John Kingsford-Smith
- Produced by: Lloyd Ravenscroft
- Narrated by: David Low
- Cinematography: Gordon Gibson
- Edited by: Stanley Moore
- Music by: John Antill
- Release date: 1949
- Running time: 56 min
- Country: Australia
- Language: English

The Inlanders is a 1949 Australian documentary showing the work of the Australian Inland Mission (AIM). The filmmakers followed AIM's Reverend K. F. Partridge for over five months on his rounds for the Mission. They travelled through Coober Pedy, Innamincka, Leigh Creek, Everard Ranges, Oodnadata and Alice Springs. The filmmakers were asked by the AIM to document Partridge's patrol. The film was positively received both in Australia and in Britain.

The Sydney Morning Herald said "This confident little narrative of a mission officer's journey by car through the remotest backblocks of central Australia is workmanlike and interesting - the most absorbing film about Australia's "dead heart" that we can remember" It was described in the Age's Chiel's Film Review as looking "like a newspaper article by a competent reporter, translated into action. It is deeply interesting without being exciting." George Hart's capsule review in the Sun said "As a pictorial record of Central Australia—that strange, desolate area of which we Australians know so little—it is one of the year's most fascinating films of this type."
