= Assault on Salamaua =

- Directed by: Ken G. Hall (uncredited)
- Produced by: Ken G. Hall (uncredited)
- Narrated by: Peter Bathurst
- Cinematography: Damien Parer
- Edited by: Terry Banks
- Production companies: Cinesound Productions; Department of Information
- Release date: September 1943
- Running time: 9 minutes
- Country: Australia
- Language: English

Assault on Salamaua is a 1943 Australian documentary film, produced by Cinesound Productions, about the Salamaua–Lae campaign during World War II.

It features an introduction by Damien Parer, who shot most of the footage.

This documentary features the iconic shot of a wounded, blinded soldier being assisted across a stream.
