= Moresby Under the Blitz =

- Directed by: Ken G. Hall
- Produced by: Ken G. Hall
- Cinematography: Damien Parer
- Production company: Cinesound Productions
- Release date: 31 July 1942
- Running time: 10 minutes
- Country: Australia
- Language: English

Moresby Under the Blitz is a short 1942 Australian documentary made for propaganda purposes.
