= Harvest Gold =

- Directed by: Mervyn Murphy
- Produced by: Harold Gray
- Starring: Joe Valli
- Cinematography: Arthur Higgins
- Music by: Sydney John Kay
- Production company: Supreme Sound System
- Distributed by: Caltex Oil (Australia)
- Release date: 1945
- Running time: 55 minutes
- Country: Australia
- Language: English

Harvest Gold is a 1945 Australian industrial film about a farmer who clings to old methods of production.

== Synopsis ==
The film explores various aspects of mechanical farming, from clearing the land to harvesting, and deals with the clash of attitudes between McDougal, a farmer who favours old methods, and Johnson who supports new ways. Matters come to a head when a cyclone threatens McDougal's crop and Johnson comes to his assistance with his machines to help him harvest in time.

There is some comic relief and a romantic subplot.

== Cast ==
- Joe Valli as McDougal
- Harry Abdy as Johnson
- Tal Ordell as Mat
- Leal Douglas as Mrs McDougal
- Ethel Lang as Mrs Johnson
- Bruce Beeby as Harry Johnson

== Production ==
The film was the only feature directed by Mervyn Murphy who ran Supreme Sound Studios in Sydney for many years. It was produced under the auspices of the New South Wales Department of Agriculture and distributed by the oil company Caltex.

Shooting took place around Tamworth and Campbelltown, with interiors at Supreme's studio in North Sydney. The support of the Department of Agriculture enabled the use of film stock, which was rare because of the war.

== Reception ==
The film was given a private screening to William McKell, then-Premier of New South Wales, and various members of his cabinet. It was distributed along with an educational booklet and screened widely in non-commercial outlets.
