= Kokoda Front Line! =

1942 newsreel by Ken G. Hall

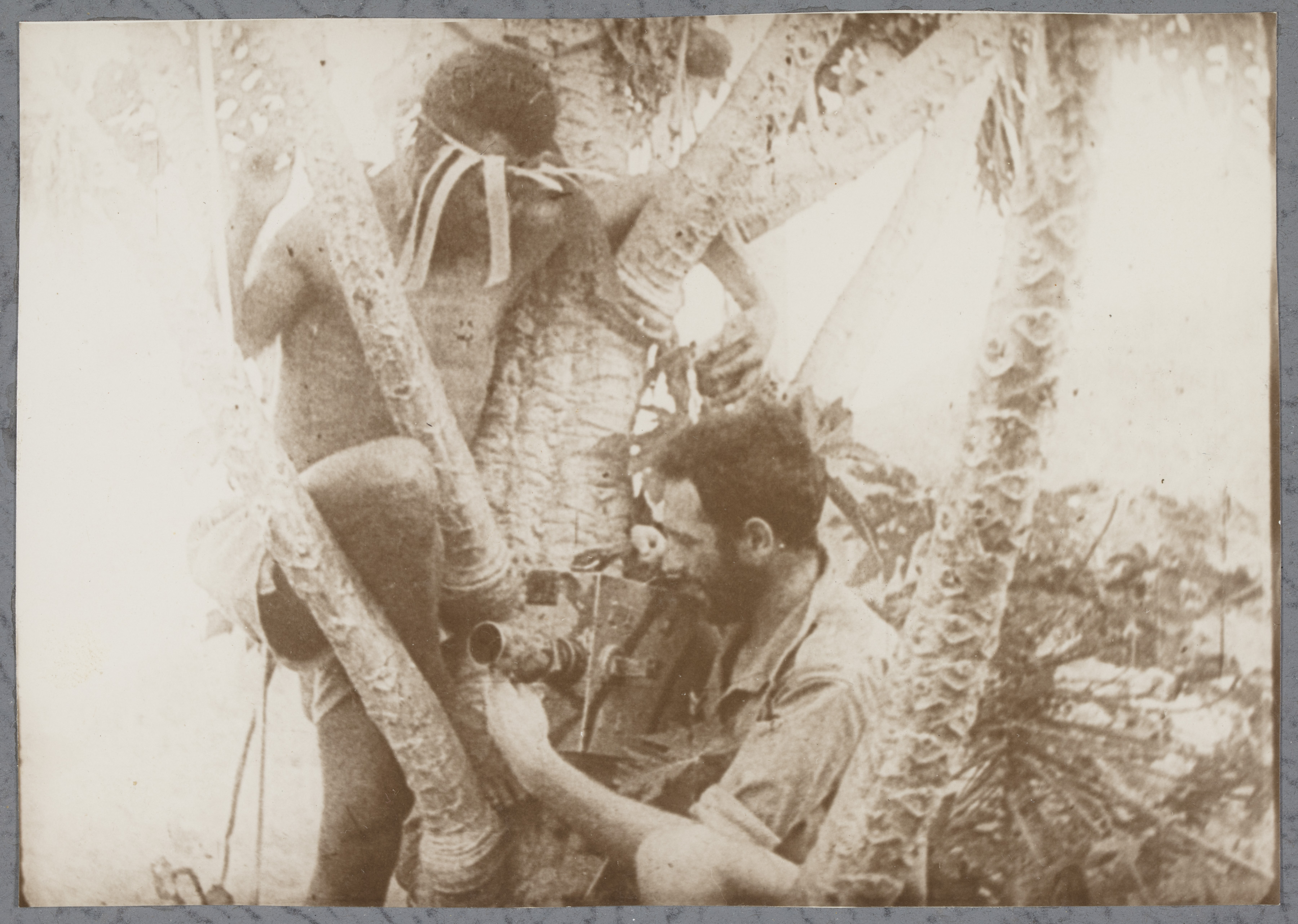
- Damien Parer and Papuan Assistant filming Kokoda Front Line, 1942, from album of prints held by State Library of New South Wales
- Directed by: Ken G. Hall
- Cinematography: Damien Parer
- Edited by: Terry Banks
- Production company: Cinesound Productions
- Release date: 18 September 1942
- Running time: 9 minutes
- Country: Australia
- Language: English

Kokoda Front Line! is a full-length edition of the Australian newsreel, Cinesound Review, produced by the Australian News & Information Bureau and Cinesound Productions Limited in 1942, about the Kokoda Track campaign. It was one of four winners of the 15th Academy Awards for best documentary, and the first Australian film to win an Oscar. It was filmed by the Australian war photographer Damien Parer and directed by Ken G. Hall.

Damien Parer is often cited as one of Australia's early Academy Award winners, however the award was made to the director, Ken G. Hall.

Much of Parer's footage was used in a documentary made by a rival company, Movietone, The Road to Kokoda.

== See also ==
- List of Allied propaganda films of World War II
