= Mervyn Murphy =

Mervyn Murphy (1912–1971) was an Australian filmmaker who started Supreme Sound Studios in Sydney in 1935. Supreme Sound worked on numerous features, documentaries, advertisements and newsreels. He developed the colour systems Solarchrome and Panachrome.

Murphy directed the industrial film Harvest Gold (1945) and assisted numerous Australian films.
