= Damien Parer =

Australian photographer (1912–1944)

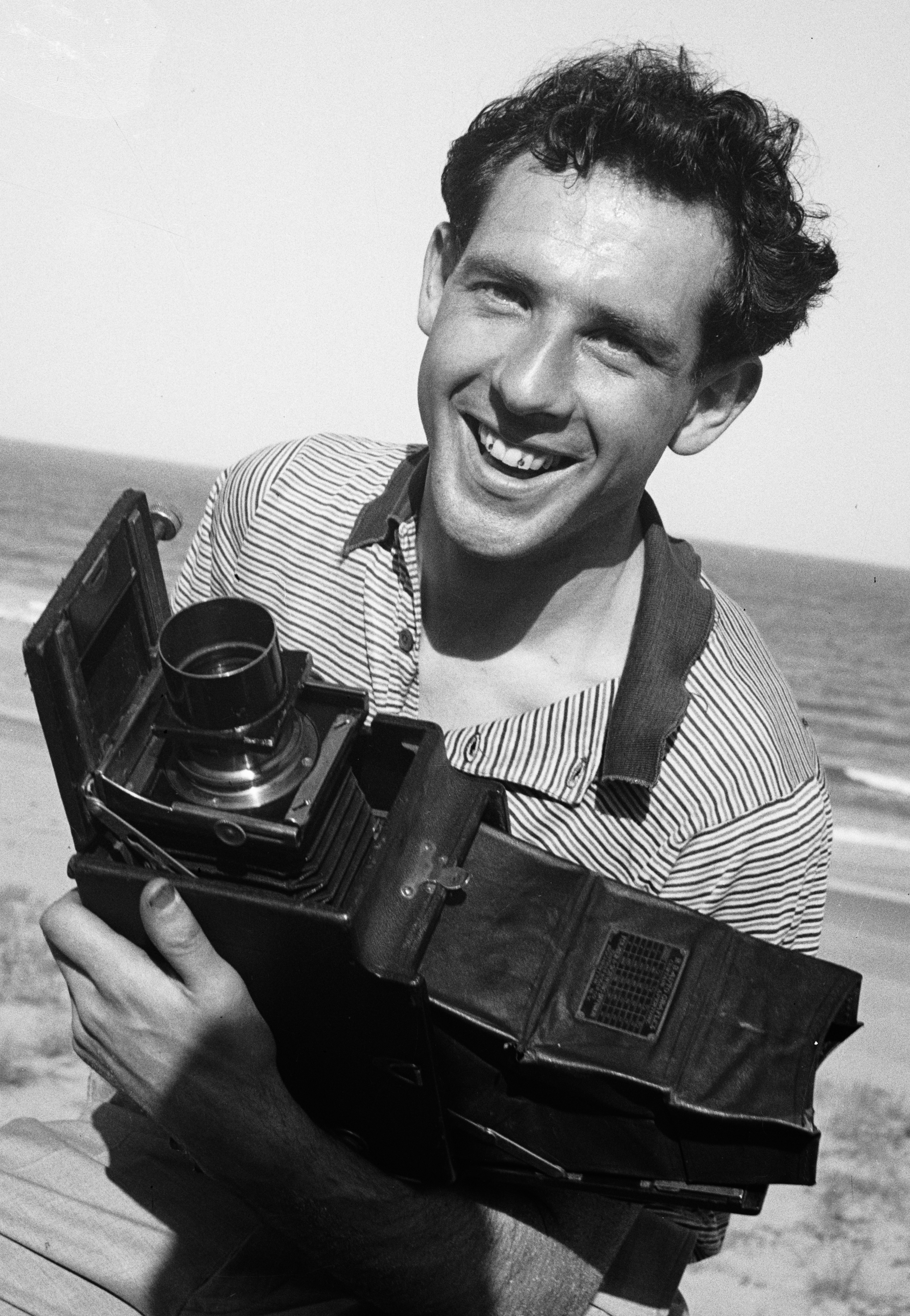
- Born: 1 August 1912; Malvern, Victoria, Australia
- Died: 17 September 1944 (aged 32); Peleliu, Palau
- Cause of death: Killed in action
- Occupations: Australian cameraman and award-winning war cinematographer
- Spouse: Elizabeth Marie Cotter
- Children: 1

Damien Peter Parer (1 August 1912 – 17 September 1944) was an Australian war photographer. He became famous for his war photography of the Second World War, and was killed by Japanese machine-gun fire at Peleliu, Palau. He was cinematographer for Australia's first Oscar-winning film, Kokoda Front Line!, an edition of the weekly newsreel, Cinesound Review, which was produced by Ken G. Hall.

== Early life ==
Damien Parer was born at Malvern in Melbourne, the seventh child of John Arthur Parer, a Spanish-Catalan-born hotel manager on King Island and his wife Teresa, the daughter of JP Carolin a Tasmanian and Mary Corcoran from Tipperary, Ireland. In 1923, he and his brother Adrian were sent as boarders to St Stanislaus' College in Bathurst and St Kevin's College, Melbourne. He joined the school's camera club, and decided that he wanted to be a photographer, rather than a priest. However, finding a job as a photographer in depression-era Australia proved difficult, so he resumed his education at St Kevin's in East Melbourne. While at this school he won a prize in a photographic competition run by the Melbourne newspaper The Argus, and used the money to buy a Graflex camera used by professional photographers.

Parer obtained an apprenticeship with Arthur Dickinson. He said later that he learned most about photography from Dickinson and Max Dupain. He finished his apprenticeship in 1933 and, in mid-1934, obtained work with the director Charles Chauvel on the film Heritage, where he met and became friends with another up-and-coming filmmaker of the time, John Heyer. In September 1935 Damien was offered and accepted via telegram the Assistant Cameraman position on Chauvel's film Rangle River. At the conclusion of that film, and with the help of Chauvel, he obtained work in Sydney, and so moved there in 1935.

== Career ==
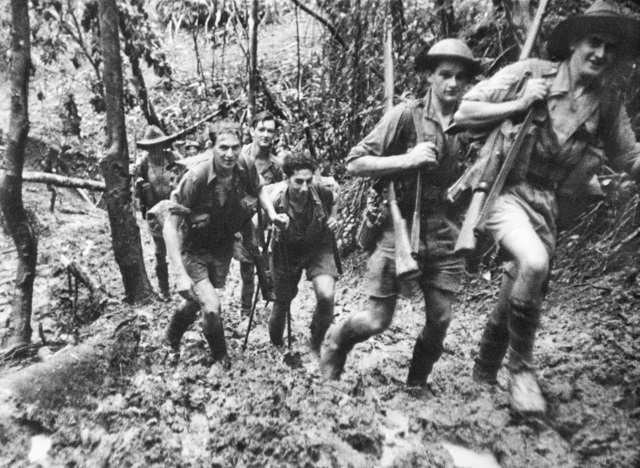
Australian 39th Battalion troops returning to their base after battling the Japanese at Isurava, Papua New Guinea, 1942

By World War II, Parer was experienced at photography and motion pictures, and was appointed as official movie photographer to the Australian Imperial Force (AIF)

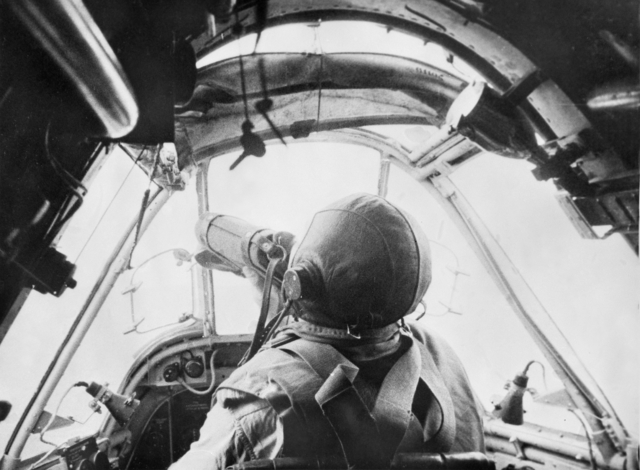
Still frame from The Bismarck Convoy Smashed (1943). Flight Lieutenant Ron "Torchy" Uren of No. 30 Squadron RAAF takes a drink from his water canteen while in the cockpit of his Bristol Beaufighter during the Battle of the Bismarck Sea. Parer flew with him to record attacks against Japanese ships

His first war footage was taken on HMAS Sydney after it had sunk the Italian cruiser Bartolomeo Colleoni. Soon afterwards, he was aboard HMS Ladybird while it was bombarding the sea port of Bardia in Libya. His first experience at close quarters was during a troop advance at Derna.

Parer filmed in Greece and in Syria, covering the action from aircraft, the deck of a ship and on the ground with the infantry. After Syria he travelled to Tobruk once again on the Ladybird in August 1941 before covering the fighting in the Western Desert. In November 1941 while looking to cover the battle at Sidi Omar, Parer was driving Major Randolph Churchill, only son of the wartime British PM Winston Churchill, and newsman Chester Wilmot when they nearly were killed by British artillery mistaking them for enemy combatants. By mid-1942 Parer was in New Guinea ready to cover the fighting against the Japanese. Together with war correspondent Osmar White, he undertook an arduous journey by schooner, launch and on foot from Port Moresby to Wau via Yule Island, Terapo and Kudjiru, in order to document the efforts of the meagre forces then fighting on the northern coast of Papua New Guinea.

During this phase of the war, he filmed some of his most famous sequences, some at Salamaua and, most notably, those used in Kokoda Front Line!. This documentary won its producer, Ken G. Hall, an Academy Award for documentary film-making. During his time in Papua New Guinea he befriended Australian artist Dennis Adams.

Damien Parer shot footage during the Battle of Guam that won him a posthumous Headliner Award from the American Journalists' Association.

Parer was killed on 17 September 1944 by Japanese gunfire while filming a United States Marine advance in Palau on the island of Peleliu.

Damien Parer's body was initially buried in a shallow grave on Peleliu but later exhumed and moved to Makassar War Cemetery, Celebes, South Sulawesi, Indonesia after the war in 1946. It was then moved to its resting place location in Ambon War Cemetery, Pandan Kasturi, Kota Ambon, Maluku, Indonesia when all the graves in Makassar were relocated there in 1961.

== Personal ==
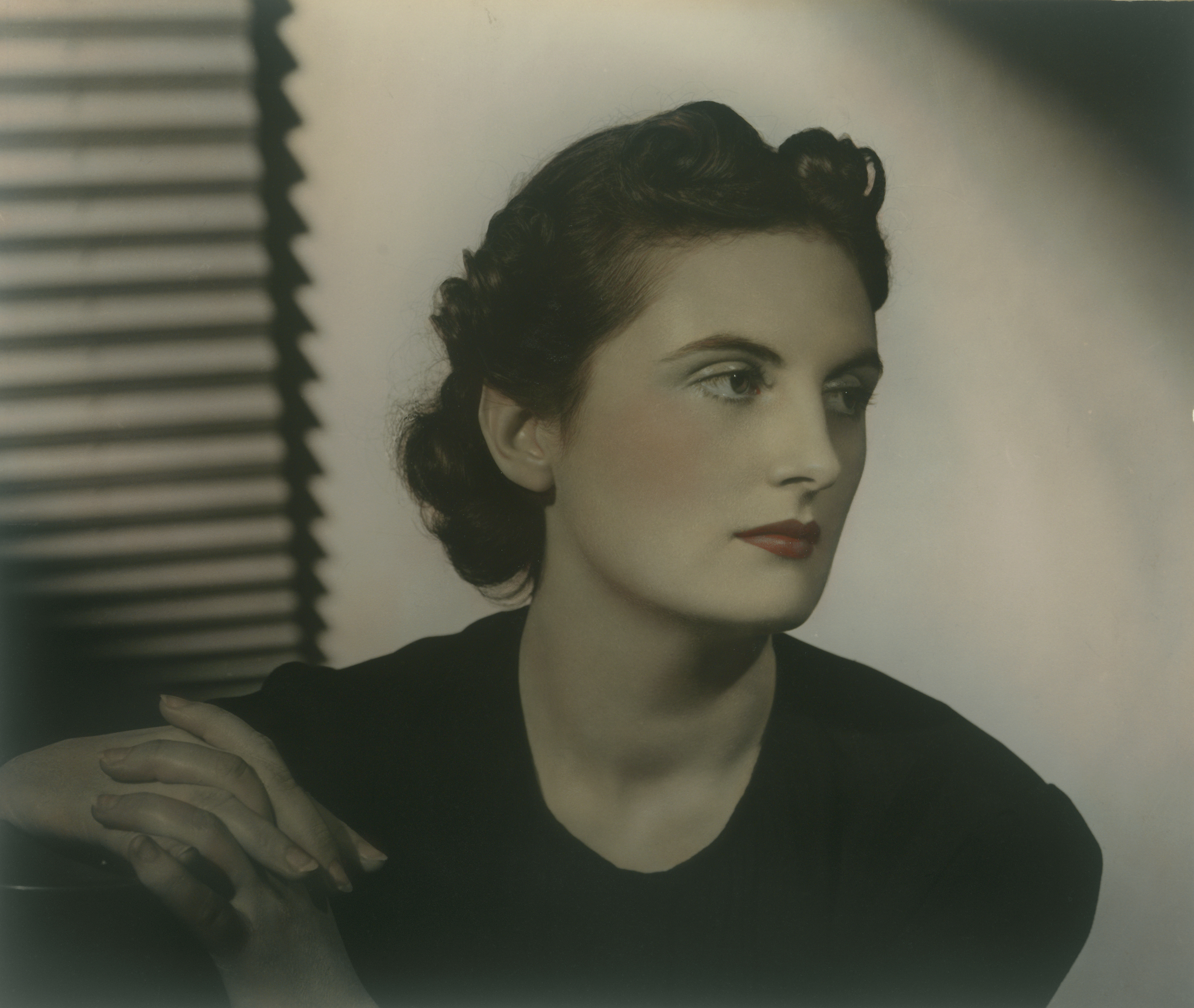
Marie Cotter, Sydney, c 1938, by Damien Parer

He married Elizabeth Marie Cotter on 23 March 1944, and his son, named Damien Robert Parer, was born in 1945, 6 months after his father was killed. Parer was a Catholic. The younger Damien became a film and TV producer.

== In popular culture ==
Fragments of War: The Story of Damien Parer was a 1988 telemovie for Network 10 directed by John Duigan with Nicholas Eadie as Parer.

A second television film called Parer's War, starring Matthew Le Nevez as Parer and Adelaide Clemens as Marie Cotter, directed by Alister Grierson, premiered on 27 April 2014 on the ABC.

== Filmography ==
Damien Parer is credited for the following films:

- Life at Sea (1940)
- Camp Life (1940)
- Anzac Day, Gaza, 1940 (1940)
- The Fall of Bardia, Naval Action (1941)
- The Action Against Tobruk (1941) with Frank Hurley
- Tobruk—The Day by Day Story (1941) with Frank Hurley
- The Evacuation of Greece (1941)
- The Return of the Seventh Division (1942)
- The Blitz on Port Moresby (1942)
- The Strangest Supply Route of the War (1942)
- Moresby Under the Blitz (1942)
- Kokoda Front Line! (1942)
- The Road to Kokoda (1942)
- Men of Timor (1942)
- RAAF Coverage, Moresby (1943)
- The Bismarck Convoy Smashed (1943)
- Assault on Salamaua (1943)
- Air Transport (1943)

His outstanding films with Paramount News from the end of August 1943:

- The Landing at Tarawa (1943)
- The Landing in the Admiralties (1944)
- The Invasion of Hollandia (1944)
- I Saw it Happen (1944) the invasion of Guam

=== Dramatic films ===
- his war footage features in A Son Is Born (1946)

== See also ==
- Neil Davis (cameraman) - Australian cameraman killed while filming in combat

== Sources ==
- McDonald, Neil (1994) War Cameraman: The Story of Damien Parer, Port Melbourne, Lothian
- McDonald, Neil (2000) "Parer, Damien (1912–1944)" in Australian Dictionary of Biography
- Who's Who in Australian Military History: Damien Peter Parer, Australian War Memorial
