= The Bismarck Convoy Smashed =

Bismark Convoy Smashed!
- Directed by: Ken G. Hall (uncredited)
- Produced by: Ken G. Hall (uncredited)
- Narrated by: Peter Bathurst
- Cinematography: Damien Parer
- Edited by: Terry Banks
- Production companies: Cinesound Productions; Department of Information
- Release date: 19 March 1943
- Running time: 9 minutes
- Country: Australia
- Language: English

Bismark Convoy Smashed!, also known as Battle of the Bismark Sea, is a Second World War 1943 Australian documentary newsreel film about the Battle of the Bismarck Sea on 2–3 March, an engagement which resulted in the claimed destruction of 22 Japanese ships, their crews and 15,000 soldiers. Actual Japanese losses were rather less, but still devastating.

It used footage shot by Damien Parer.

== Premise ==
The Bismarck Convoy Smashed tells the story of the Battle of the Bismarck Sea, in which a convoy of Japanese ships is attacked by the U.S. Army Air Forces and the Royal Australian Air Force.

== Production ==
Parer later said he was too busy to be scared filming the action.

== Reception ==
The Recorder stated that "the thrill is contagious, and the watcher finds himself leaning well for ward in his seat to see the next episode of the great air victory—one of the biggest of the war. "Battle of the Bismarck Sea" is really something worthwhile in screen fare. If it were four times the length it would still be absorbing. All should see."

The Sydney Morning Herald wrote that:

The newsreel pictures... are among the most dramatic to be screened in Sydney. They offer a thrilling bird's-eye view of the bombing and machine-gunning of the Japanese convoy by Australian and American pilots. Many of the attacks were made by pilots flying above the enemy at only mast-high levels. The grim determination behind this great aerial attack is seen in more than one vivid scene. Less commentary would improve these newsreels.

Bismarck Convoy Smashed was on a list of twenty-one films announced as Academy Award nominees for Short Subject Documentary but the Documentary Award Committee subsequently narrowed the field to seven titles and the film was not included on the final ballot.
