= 1949 in Australia =

- Decades: 1920s; 1930s; 1940s; 1950s; 1960s
- See also: 1949 in Australian literature; Other events of 1949; Federal election; Timeline of Australian history

The following lists events that happened during 1949 in Australia.

== Incumbents ==
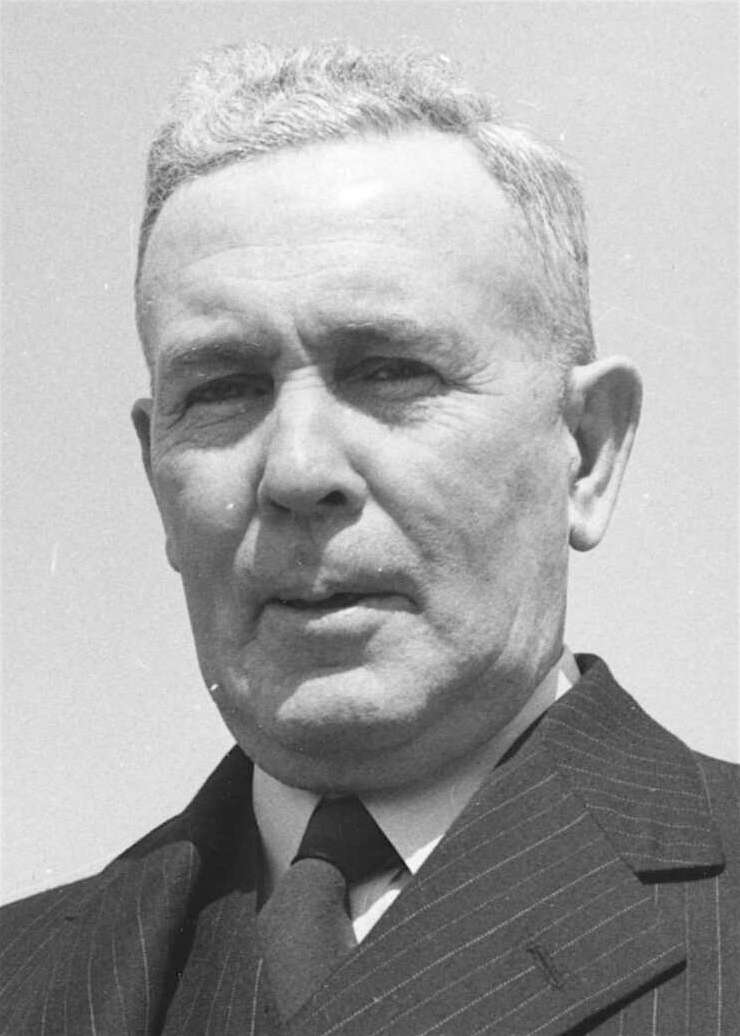
Ben Chifley

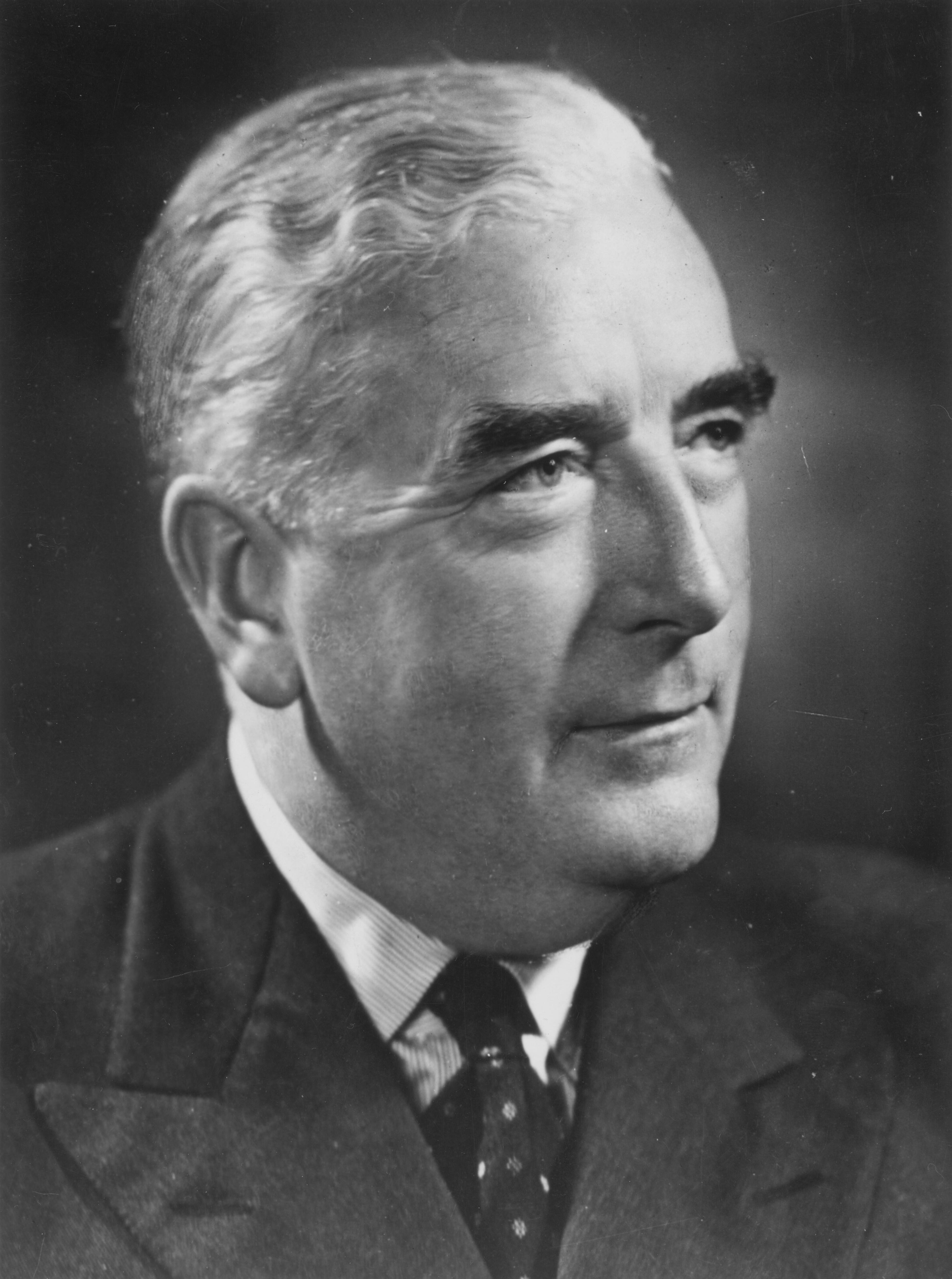
Robert Menzies

- Monarch – George VI
- Governor-General – William McKell
- Prime Minister – Ben Chifley (until 19 December), then Robert Menzies
- Chief Justice – Sir John Latham

=== State Governors ===
- Governor of New South Wales – Sir John Northcott
- Governor of Queensland – Sir John Lavarack
- Governor of South Australia – Sir Charles Norrie
- Governor of Tasmania – Sir Hugh Binney
- Governor of Victoria – Sir Winston Dugan (until 20 February), then Sir Dallas Brooks (from 18 October)
- Governor of Western Australia – Sir James Mitchell

== Events ==
- 26 January – The Nationality and Citizenship Act is passed. Rather than being identified as subjects of Britain, the Act established Australian citizenship for people who met eligibility requirements.
- 2 March - A cyclone crosses the Central Queensland coast impacting Gladstone and Rockhampton.
- 10 March – A Lockheed Model 18 Lodestar crashes near Coolangatta, Queensland, killing all 21 on board.
- 16 March – Australia's domestic counter-intelligence and security agency, the Australian Security Intelligence Organisation (ASIO) is established, by order of the Directive for the Establishment and Maintenance of a Security Service.
- 16 March – Indigenous Australians who are eligible to vote in state elections in New South Wales, Victoria, South Australia and Tasmania are also given the right to vote in federal elections.
- 27 June – A seven-week coal strike begins, involving 23,000 miners and broken by the sending in of troops.
- 2 July - A MacRobertson Miller Aviation DC-3 aircraft crashes on take-off from Perth Airport, killing all 18 on board.
- 17 October – Construction of the Snowy Mountains Hydro-Electric Scheme begins.
- 10 December – A federal election is held. The incumbent Australian Labor Party led by Ben Chifley is defeated by Robert Menzies' Liberal Party.
- 18 December – Prime Minister-elect Robert Menzies announces his cabinet, including Dame Enid Lyons as Australia's first female cabinet minister.

== Science and technology ==
- November – Australia's first digital computer, CSIRAC, runs its first test programs.

== Arts and literature ==
- 21 January – William Dobell wins the Archibald Prize and the Wynne Prize.

== Sport ==
- Athletics
  - 17 September - Robert Prentice wins his first men's national marathon title, clocking 2:43:46 in Perth
- Cricket
  - New South Wales wins the Sheffield Shield
- Football
  - Bledisloe Cup: won by the Wallabies
  - Brisbane Rugby League premiership: Souths defeated Easts 22–8
  - New South Wales Rugby League premiership: Western Suburbs defeated Balmain 8–5
  - South Australian National Football League premiership: won by North Adelaide
  - Victorian Football League premiership: Essendon defeated Carlton 125–52
- Golf
  - Australian Open: won by Eric Cremin
  - Australian PGA Championship: won by Kel Nagle
- Horse racing
  - Persist wins the AJC Oaks
  - Lincoln wins the Caulfield Cup
  - Delta wins the Cox Plate
  - Foxzami wins the Melbourne Cup
- Motor racing
  - The Australian Grand Prix was held at Leyburn, and was won by John Crouch driving a Delahaye
- Tennis
  - Australian Open men's singles: Frank Sedgman defeats John Bromwich 6-3 6-2 6–2
  - Australian Open women's singles: Doris Hart defeats Nancye Wynne Bolton 6-3 6–4
  - Davis Cup: Australia is defeated by the United States 1–4 in the 1949 Davis Cup final
  - US Open: John Bromwich and Bill Sidwell win the Men's Doubles
- Yachting
  - Waltzing Matilda takes line honours and Trade Winds wins on handicap in the Sydney to Hobart Yacht Race

== Births ==
- 11 January – Daryl Braithwaite, singer
- 14 January – Paul Chubb, actor (died 2002)
- 26 February – Simon Crean, trade union leader and politician (died 2023)
- 7 March – Rex Hunt, media personality
- 13 June – Red Symons, musician and TV personality
- 24 June
  - Billy Moeller, professional feather/super feather/light/light welter/welterweight boxer
  - Agenor Muniz, Brazilian-born Australian footballer
  - Hector Thompson, professional light/light welter/welter/light middleweight boxer (died 2020)
- 28 June – Kevin McLeod, Australian rules footballer
- 30 June – John Kobelke, Western Australian politician (died 2019)
- 1 July – John Farnham, singer and entertainer
- 16 July – Robert Proctor, field hockey player
- 18 July – Dennis Lillee, cricketer
- 28 July – Peter Doyle, singer and guitarist (died 2001)
- 18 August – Byron Kennedy, film producer (died 1983)
- 23 August – Rick Springfield, singer
- 22 September – Jim McGinty, politician
- 26 September – Wendy Saddington, blues, soul and jazz singer (died 2013)
- 27 September – Graham Richardson, federal politician and media commentator (died 2025)
- 14 October – Fraser Anning, politician
- 6 November – Malcolm Poole, field hockey player
- 12 November – Deb Foskey, Australian Capital Territory politician (died 2020)
- 24 November – Shane Bourne, comedian and actor
- 5 December – Wendy Craik, scientist, public policy adviser and company director

== Deaths ==
- 8 January – Mary Miller, singer (b. 1926)
- 3 February – Kate Dwyer, educator, suffragist and labour activist (b. 1861)
- 1 April – Evelyn Owen, gun designer (b. 1915)
- 7 April – Richard Crouch, Victorian politician (b. 1868)
- 26 April – Norman Brookman, South Australian politician (b. 1884)
- 14 August – Henry Ernest Boote, editor, journalist, and poet (born in the United Kingdom) (b. 1865)
- 15 August – Vida Goldstein, suffragette and social reformer (b. 1869)
- 16 August – John Lemmone, flautist, composer and manager (b. 1861)
- 27 August – Theodora Cowan, sculptor (b. 1868)
- 2 September – Jack Beasley, New South Wales politician (b. 1895)
- 9 September – Sir John Kirwan, Western Australian politician (born in the United Kingdom) (b. 1869)
- 16 November – Margaret Battye, barrister and jurist (b. 1909)
- 21 November – Philip Lytton, actor and theatre entrepreneur (b. unknown)
- 18 December – Florence Anderson, trade union secretary (b. 1871)
- Unknown – Eric Muspratt, travel writer (b. 1899)
- Unknown – Alfred Wheeler, minister and composer (b. 1865)

== See also ==
- List of Australian films of the 1940s
