= 1946 in Australia =

- Monarch: George VI
- Governor-General: Prince Henry, Duke of Gloucester
- Prime minister: Ben Chifley
- Population: 7,465,157
- Elections: Federal, TAS

The following lists events that happened during 1946 in Australia.

- Decades: 1920s; 1930s; 1940s; 1950s; 1960s
- See also: 1946 in Australian literature; Other events of 1946; Federal election; Timeline of Australian history

== Incumbents ==
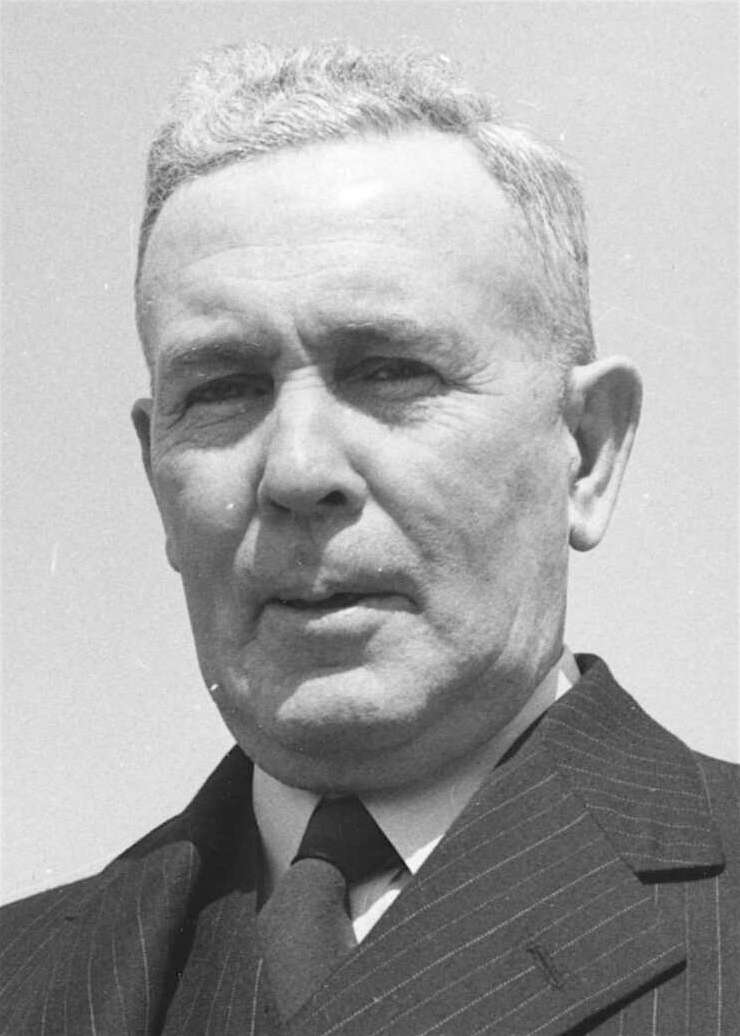
Ben Chifley

- Monarch – George VI
- Governor-General – Prince Henry, Duke of Gloucester
- Prime Minister – Ben Chifley
- Chief Justice – Sir John Latham

=== State Premiers ===
- Premier of New South Wales – William McKell
- Premier of Queensland – Frank Cooper (until 7 March), then Ned Hanlon
- Premier of South Australia – Thomas Playford IV
- Premier of Tasmania – Robert Cosgrove
- Premier of Victoria – John Cain
- Premier of Western Australia – Frank Wise

=== State Governors ===
- Governor of New South Wales – Sir John Northcott (from 1 August)
- Governor of Queensland – Sir Leslie Orme Wilson (until 23 April), then Sir John Lavarack (from 1 October)
- Governor of South Australia – Sir Charles Norrie
- Governor of Tasmania – Sir Hugh Binney
- Governor of Victoria – Sir Winston Dugan
- Governor of Western Australia – none appointed

== Events ==
- 26 January – Foundation Day is renamed Australia Day.
- 18 February – The Archbishop of Sydney, Dr. Norman Gilroy, becomes Cardinal Gilroy, the first Australian born member of the College of Cardinals
- 10 March – An Australian National Airways DC-3 aircraft crashes near Hobart, killing 25 people.
- 1 May – At least 800 Aboriginal pastoral workers walk off the job in Northwest Western Australia, starting one of the longest industrial strikes in Australia.
- 6 June – The ABC makes the first national broadcast of a federal parliamentary debate.
- 19 July – Orange, New South Wales is proclaimed a city.
- 30 August – Lismore, New South Wales is proclaimed a city.
- 9 September – Trans Australia Airlines makes its first flight.
- 28 September – A federal election is held. The Australian Labor Party and Prime Minister Ben Chifley are returned to power. A three-question referendum is also held: the question on Social Services is carried; questions on Marketing and Industrial Employment are not.
- 23 November – A general election is held in Tasmania. The Labor Party led by Robert Cosgrove is returned to power with a reduced majority.
- 13 December – The United Nations grants Australia trusteeship of Territory of New Guinea and Territory of Papua.

== Science and technology ==
- 7 August – Overseas Telecommunications Commission established by an Act of Parliament in August 1946. It inherited facilities and resources from AWA and Cable & Wireless, and was charged with responsibility for all international telecommunications services into, through and out of Australia.

== Arts and literature ==
- William Dargie wins the Archibald Prize with his portrait of L. C. Robson

== Film ==
- The Overlanders is released, starring Chips Rafferty

== Politics ==
- establishment of the Western Australian Women’s Parliament

== Sport ==
- 14 September – Balmain win the 1946 NSWRFL season, defeating St. George 13–12 in the grand final. South Sydney, after not winning a game all season, finish in last place, claiming the wooden spoon for the second year in a row.
- Morna takes line honours and Christina wins on handicap in the Sydney to Hobart Yacht Race
- Russia wins the Melbourne Cup
- New Zealand defeats Australia 2–0 in a Rugby union test

== Births ==
- 8 February – Bob Collins, politician (died 2007)
- 24 February – Bob Pearce, politician
- 3 March – Tim Fischer, politician (died 2019)
- 4 April – Colin Coates, ice speed skater
- 10 April – Anne Boyd, composer
- 17 April – Kerry O'Brien, middle-distance runner (died 2025)
- 23 May – David Graham, golfer
- 3 June – Tristan Rogers, Australian-American actor (died 2025)
- 9 July – Bon Scott, singer (died 1980)
- 1 August – Fiona Stanley, epidemiologist
- 15 August – Victor Salvemini, Paralympic athlete (died 2020)
- 1 September – Barry Gibb, musician-songwriter (Bee Gees)
- 16 September – Mike Reynolds, Qld Parliament Speaker
- 18 October – Penelope Wensley, Governor of Queensland (2008–2014)
- 28 October – John Hewson, politician
- 30 October – Doug Parkinson, singer (died 2021)
- 2 November – Alan Jones, racing driver
- 20 December – John Bertrand, yachtsman

== Deaths ==
- 2 January – Joe Darling, cricketer (b. 1870)
- 12 February – Sir David Gordon, South Australian politician (b. 1865 - d. 1946)
- 20 March – Ethel Richardson, author (died in the United Kingdom) (b. 1870)
- 27 March – Sir Robert Best, Victorian politician and lawyer (b. 1856)
- 13 September – William Watt, 24th Premier of Victoria (b. 1871)

== See also ==
- List of Australian films of the 1940s
