= Mary Miller =

Mary Miller may refer to:

== Performers ==
- Mary Miller (soprano) (c.1926–1949), Australian concert singer
- Mary Miller (actress) (1929–2020), English stage and TV performer
- Mary K. Miller (born 1957), American country singer

== Public officials ==
- Mary Miller Glasscock (1872–1925), American wife of West Virginia governor, William Glasscock
- Dame Mary Hedley-Miller (1923–2010), British Treasury under-secretary
- Mary J. Miller (born 1955), American Treasury Under secretary
- Mary Miller (politician) (born 1959), American congresswoman from Illinois

== Writers ==
- Mary Boykin Miller (1823–1886), American diarist (Mary Chesnut's Civil War)
- Mary A. Miller (1837–1925), American missionary editor
- Mary Rogers Miller (1868–1971), American writer and educator
- Mary Farnham Miller (1872–1920), American botanist
- Mary Durack Miller (1913–1994), Australian author and historian
- Mary Miller (art historian) (born 1952), American academic and author
- Mary Dockray-Miller (born 1965), American scholar of history
- Mary Miller (artistic director) (active since 1990), Scottish violinist, music critic for The Scotsman
- Mary Miller (writer) (active since 2009), American fiction writer

== Others ==
- Mary Miller (Colorado businesswoman) (1843–1921), American pioneer; founder of Lafayette, Colorado
- Mary Millicent Miller (1846–1894), American steamboat master

== See also ==
- Mary Millar (1936–1998), English singer and actress (Keeping Up Appearances)
