= Kevin McLeod =

Kevin McLeod or MacLeod may refer to:

== Sports ==
- Kevin McLeod (footballer, born 1980), English footballer
- Kevin McLeod (Australian footballer) (born 1949), Australian footballer for Footscray
- Kevin McLeod (American football) (born 1974), football player

== Others ==
- Kevin MacLeod (born 1972), American musician and soundtrack composer
- Kevin S. MacLeod (born 1951), Canadian Secretary to the Queen
- Kevin McLeod, member of Scottish folk music groups The Singing Kettle and Funbox

== See also ==
- Kevin McCloud (born 1959), British designer, writer and television presenter
