= Go native =

Go native or variants may refer to:

- Go Native, an Irish Thoroughbred racehorse

== Going Native ==
- Going Native, travel book by Eric Muspratt 1936
- Going Native, by Oliver St John Gogarty 1940
- Going Native, novel by Stephen Wright 1994
- Going Native (revue), 1940-1941 Washington D.C. Loew's Theater revue
- Going Native (South Park)

== See also ==
- Clientitis, somewhat similar to "going native"
- Oikophobia, an aversion to home surroundings
- Off the verandah, a movement in early anthropology opposed to armchair theorising
