= 1945 in Australia =

- Monarch: George VI
- Governor-General: Alexander Hore-Ruthven, 1st Earl of Gowrie, then Duke of Gloucester
- Prime minister: John Curtin, Frank Forde, Ben Chifley
- Population: 7,391,692
- Elections: VIC

The following lists events that happened during 1945 in Australia.

- Decades: 1920s; 1930s; 1940s; 1950s; 1960s
- See also: 1945 in Australian literature; Other events of 1945; Timeline of Australian history

== Incumbents ==
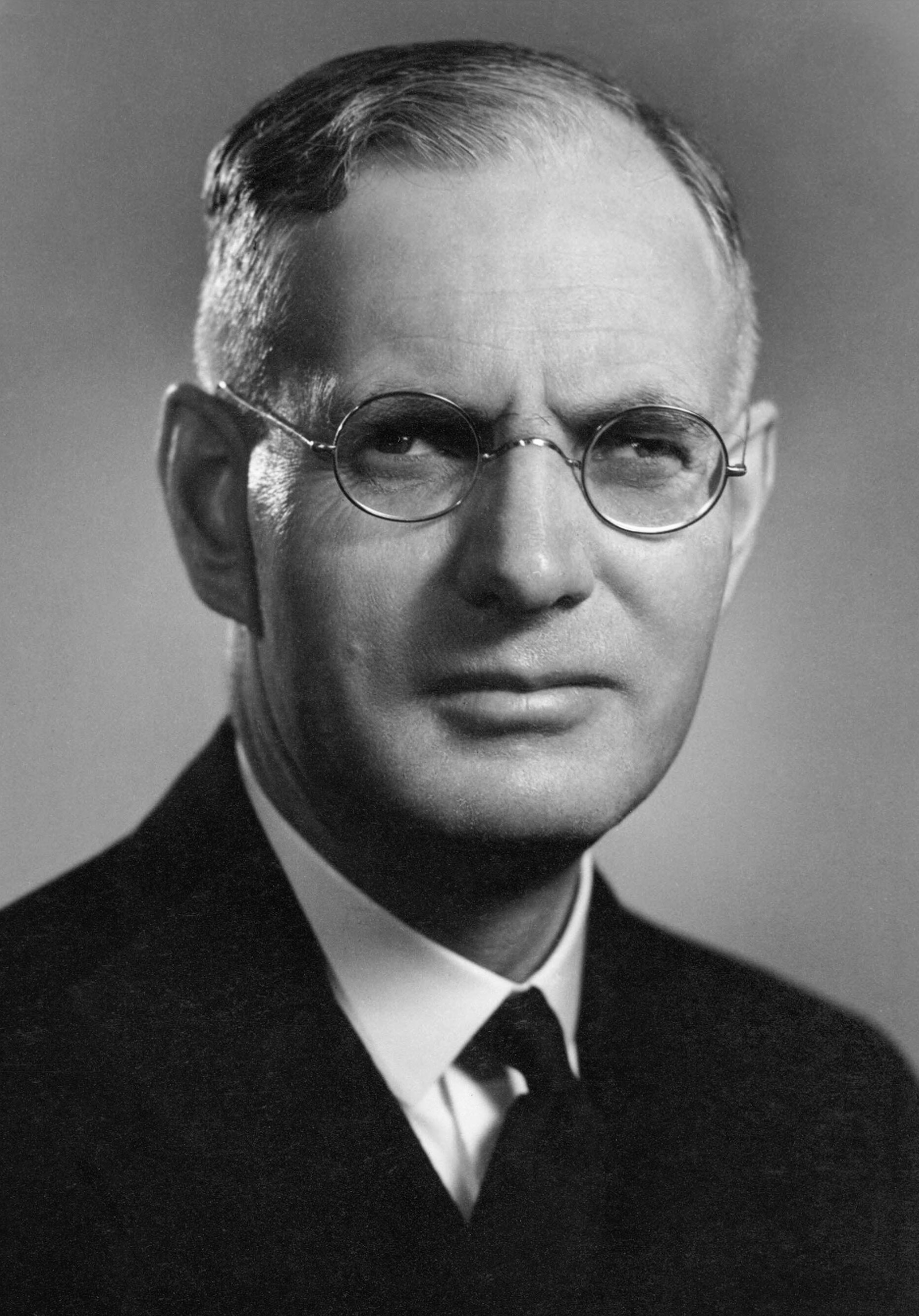
John Curtin

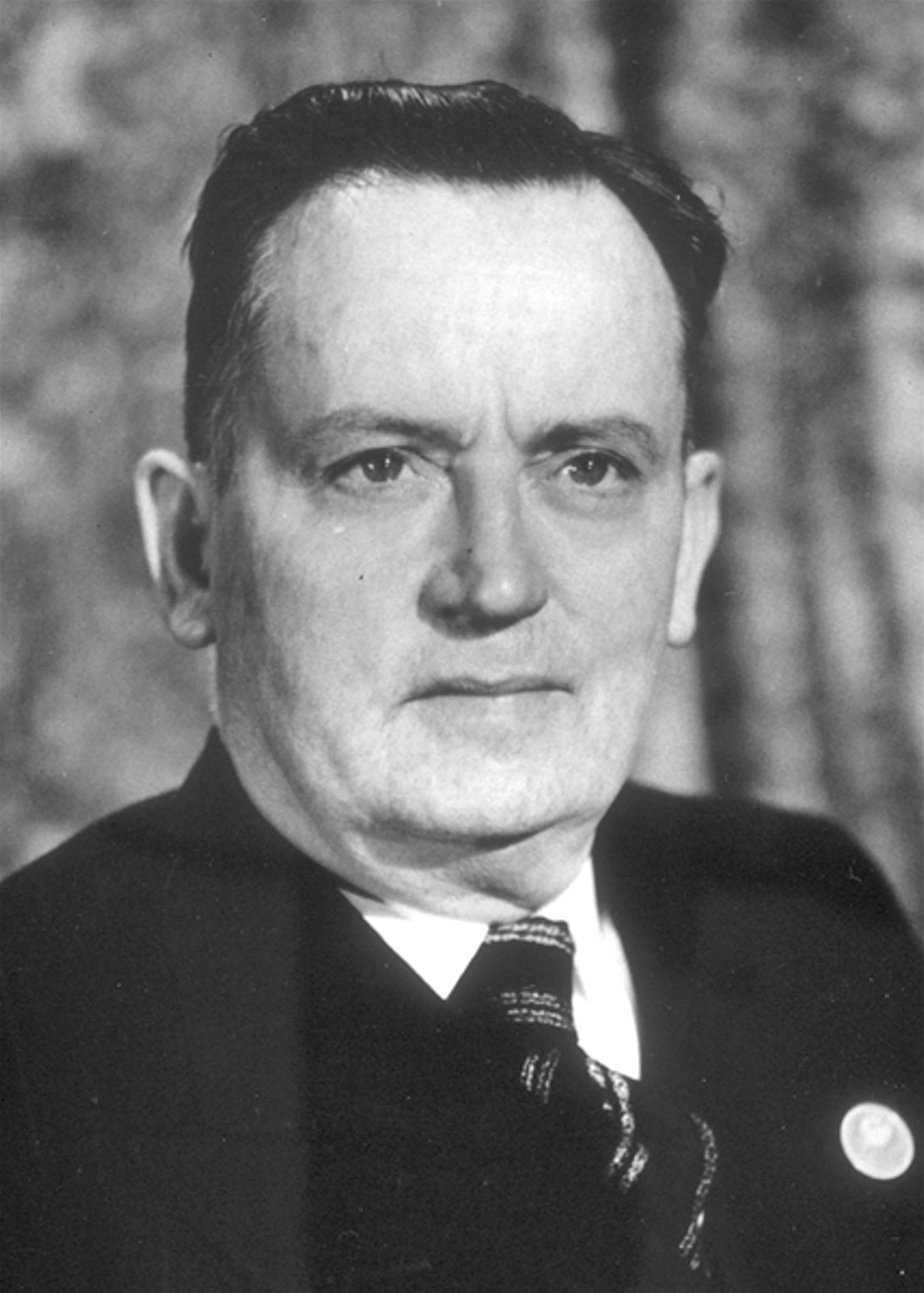
Frank Forde

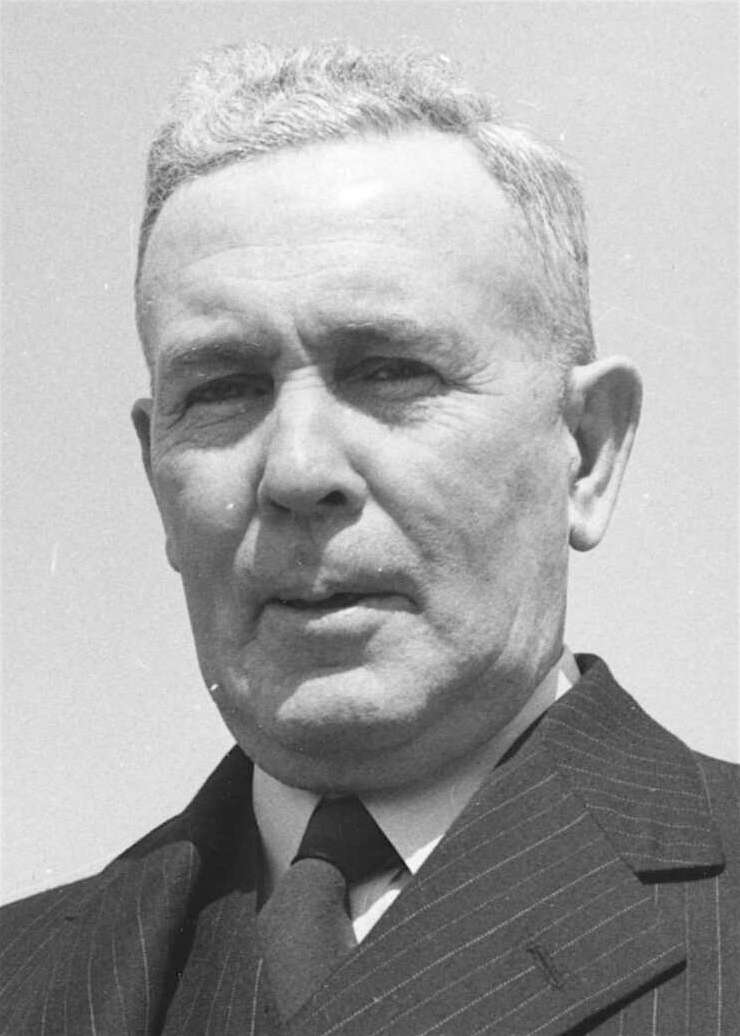
Ben Chifley

- Monarch – George VI
- Governor-General – Alexander Hore-Ruthven, 1st Baron Gowrie (until 30 January), then the Duke of Gloucester
- Prime Minister – John Curtin (died in office 5 July), then Frank Forde (until 13 July), then Ben Chifley
- Chief Justice – Sir John Latham

=== State Premiers ===
- Premier of New South Wales – William McKell
- Premier of Queensland – Frank Cooper
- Premier of South Australia – Thomas Playford IV
- Premier of Tasmania – Robert Cosgrove
- Premier of Victoria – Albert Dunstan (until 2 October), then Ian MacFarlan (until 21 November), then John Cain
- Premier of Western Australia – John Willcock (until 31 July), then Frank Wise

=== State Governors ===
- Governor of New South Wales – John Loder, 2nd Baron Wakehurst (until 6 June)
- Governor of Queensland – Sir Leslie Orme Wilson
- Governor of South Australia – Sir Charles Norrie
- Governor of Tasmania – Sir Ernest Clark (until 4 August), then Sir Hugh Binney (from 24 December)
- Governor of Victoria – Sir Winston Dugan
- Governor of Western Australia – none appointed

== Events ==
- 30 January – Prince Henry, Duke of Gloucester becomes Australia's first royal Governor-General.
- 31 January – A Stinson aircraft crashes in Victoria, killing all 10 on board.
- 9 May – Germany surrenders to the Allies, ending World War II in Europe.
- 26 June – Dr H. V. Evatt signs the United Nations Charter on behalf of Australia.
- 8 to 30 June – Perth receives 18.74 inches (476.1 mm) of rain in twenty-three days, easily its heaviest monthly rainfall on record and unlikely to be approached due to anthropogenic global warming.
- 5 July – Prime Minister John Curtin dies in office from heart problems at The Lodge in Canberra.
- 6 July – Frank Forde is sworn in as Prime Minister of Australia, following the death of John Curtin. He will serve Australia's shortest term as prime minister, being replaced by Ben Chifley a week later.
- 7 July – The Australian 7th Division commences operations in the Battle of Balikpapan. Operations are completed by 21 July.
- 13 July – Ben Chifley is elected as leader of the Australian Labor Party, becoming the 16th Prime Minister of Australia.
- 15 August – Japan surrenders to the Allies, ending World War II. The day is known as V-P Day (Victory in the Pacific).
- 10 November – A general election is held in Victoria.

== Science and technology ==
- 12 December – Howard Florey shares the Nobel Prize in Physiology or Medicine for his work on penicillin.

== Arts and literature ==
- June – Ern Malley hoax
- William Dargie wins the Archibald Prize with his portrait of Edmund Herring
- Russell Drysdale paints The Drover's Wife

== Film ==
- 1 May – The Australian National Film Board is established.

== Sport ==
- 1 September – Eastern Suburbs defeats Balmain 22–18 in the final of the 1945 New South Wales Rugby Football League season. South Sydney finish in last place, claiming the wooden spoon.
- 29 September – The 1945 VFL Grand Final is held, and becomes known as the "Bloodbath" due to the wet, muddy conditions and frequent violence between players and amongst the spectators. Carlton defeats South Melbourne 15.13 (103) to 10.15 (75).
- 6 November – Rainbird wins the Melbourne Cup.
- 26 December – The first Sydney to Hobart Yacht Race begins. The British yacht Rani wins both line honours and the handicap, arriving in Hobart on 3 January.

== Births ==
- 1 January – Peter Duncan, politician
- 2 January
  - Diane Fahey, poet
  - Byron Barnard Lamont, botanist
- 8 January – Jeannie Lewis, musician
- 10 January – John Fahey, 38th Premier of New South Wales (1992–1995) (died 2020)
- 15 January – John Peard, rugby league player and coach
- 19 January – Judith Clingan, composer and musician
- 22 January – Arthur Beetson, rugby league player and coach (died 2011)
- 22 January – Ken Ticehurst, politician
- 26 January – John Coates, mathematician (died 2022)
- 28 January – Peter Cochran, politician
- 11 February
  - Ralph Doubell, Olympic athlete
  - Peter Blackmore, politician
- 23 February – Robert Gray, poet (died 2025)
- 26 February – Peter Brock, racing driver (died 2006)
- 3 March – George Miller, film director and producer
- 16 March – Michael Cobb, politician
- 28 March – Johnny Famechon, boxer (died 2022)
- 10 April – Kevin Berry, butterfly swimmer (died 2006)
- 13 April – Judy Nunn, actress, author
- 8 May – Janine Haines, politician (died 2004)
- 17 May – Tony Roche, tennis player
- 22 May – Bob Katter, politician
- 27 May – George Thompson, politician
- 29 May – Chris Barrie, Chief of the Defence Force
- 1 June – Kerry Vincent, chef and author (died 2021)
- 2 June – Michael Leunig, cartoonist (died 2024)
- 10 June – Martin Wesley-Smith, composer (died 2019)
- 13 July – Ashley Mallett, cricketer (died 2021)
- 17 July – Athena Starwoman, astrologer (died 2004)
- 18 July
  - Kevin Neale, Australian rules footballer (died 2023)
  - Max Tolson, soccer player
- 21 July – Geoff Dymock, cricketer
- 1 August – Ken Aldred, politician (died 2016)
- 2 August – Alex Jesaulenko, Australian rules football player
- 6 August – Tony Dell, cricketer
- 7 August
  - Graeme Blundell, actor
  - Graham Ramshaw, Australian rules football player (died 2006)
- 12 August – Mal Washer, politician
- 18 August – Gillian Bouras, writer
- 23 August – Ian McManus, politician
- 27 August – Kerry O'Brien, television journalist
- 22 October – Clover Moore, politician, 82nd Lord Mayor of the City of Sydney (2004–present)
- 25 October – Peter Ledger, illustrator (died 1994)
- 26 October – John Romeril, playwright
- 1 November – John Williamson, singer
- 15 November – Roger Donaldson, New Zealand film director
- 19 November – Barry Haase, politician
- 26 November – Roger Price, politician
- 27 November – Simon Townsend, journalist and television presenter (died 2025)
- 28 November – John Hargreaves, actor (died 1996)
- 5 December – Joanne Burns, poet
- 7 December – Bob Martin, politician
- 15 December – Thaao Penghlis, actor
- 21 December – Doug Walters, cricketer
- 22 December – Sam Newman, Australian rules football player and media personality
- 31 December – Vernon Wells, actor

== Deaths ==
- 28 January – Samuel Dennis, Victorian politician (b. 1870)
- 4 March – Sir Harry Chauvel, 11th Chief of the General Staff (b. 1865)
- 5 March – Rupert Downes, soldier (b. 1885)
- 6 April – Paddy Stokes, New South Wales politician (b. 1884)
- 15 April – Thomas Collins, New South Wales politician (b. 1884)
- 1 June – Walter Frederick Gale, banker and astronomer (b. 1865)
- 5 June – Albert Piddington, New South Wales politician and High Court judge (b. 1862)
- 5 July – John Curtin, Prime Minister of Australia (b. 1885)
- 10 July – Jack Moses, bush poet (b. 1861)
- 11 July – Frank Hill, New South Wales politician (b. 1883)
- 29 July – Henry Burrell, naturalist (b. 1873)
- 5 August – Alfred Reid, New South Wales politician (b. 1867)
- 20 August – Sir Macpherson Robertson, confectioner (b. 1859)
- 6 September – David Hall, New South Wales politician and barrister (b. 1874)
- 15 September – William Calman Grahame, New South Wales politician (b. 1863)
- 15 October – Tom Swiney, New South Wales politician (b. 1875)
- 12 November – Reginald Weaver, New South Wales politician (b. 1876)
- 6 December – Sir Edmund Dwyer-Gray, Premier of Tasmania (b. 1870)

== See also ==
- List of Australian films of the 1940s
