= 1948 in Australia =

- Monarch: George VI
- Governor-General: William McKell
- Prime minister: Ben Chifley
- Population: 7,708,761
- Elections: TAS

The following lists events that happened during 1948 in Australia.

- Decades: 1920s; 1930s; 1940s; 1950s; 1960s
- See also: 1948 in Australian literature; Other events of 1948; Timeline of Australian history

== Incumbents ==
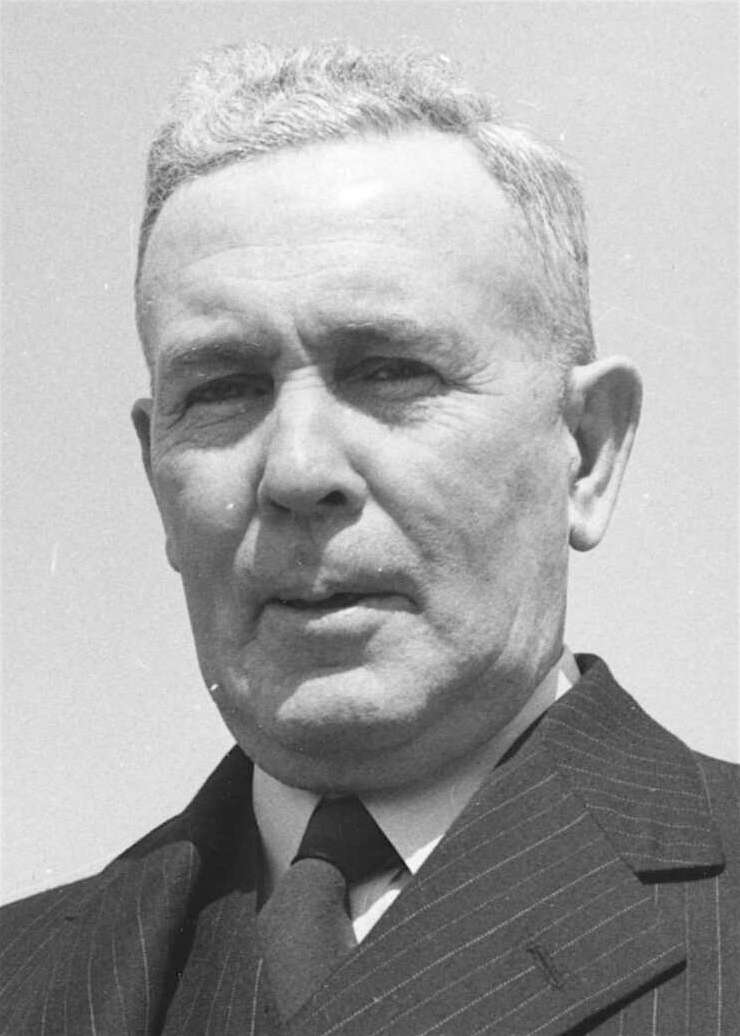
Ben Chifley

- Monarch – George VI
- Governor General – William McKell
- Prime Minister – Ben Chifley
- Chief Justice – Sir John Latham

=== State Premiers ===
- Premier of New South Wales – James McGirr
- Premier of Queensland – Ned Hanlon
- Premier of South Australia – Thomas Playford IV
- Premier of Tasmania – Edward Brooker (until 25 February), then Robert Cosgrove
- Premier of Victoria – Thomas Hollway
- Premier of Western Australia – Ross McLarty

=== State Governors ===
- Governor of New South Wales – Sir John Northcott
- Governor of Queensland – Sir John Lavarack
- Governor of South Australia – Sir Charles Norrie
- Governor of Tasmania – Sir Hugh Binney
- Governor of Victoria – Sir Winston Dugan
- Governor of Western Australia – Sir James Mitchell (from 5 October)

== Events ==
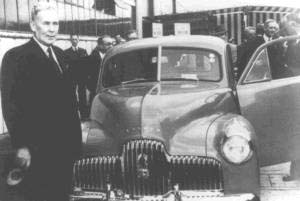
Launch of the first Holden

- 23 January – De Havilland Australia conducts the first flight of its 3 engined Drover transport aircraft at Bankstown Airport.
- 19 February – An Avro Lincoln bomber crashes at RAAF Base Amberley in Queensland, killing 16 Royal Australian Air Force personnel.
- 25 February – Robert Cosgrove is reinstated as Premier of Tasmania after being cleared of corruption charges on 22 February.
- 8 May – Margaret McIntyre becomes the first woman elected to the Parliament of Tasmania. She is killed in a plane crash later in the year.
- 29 May – A federal referendum is held, asking one question on Rents and Prices. It is not carried.
- 1 July – The Pharmaceutical Benefits Scheme is introduced.
- 21 August – A state election is held in Tasmania. The result is a hung parliament, but Robert Cosgrove and Labor retain power with the support of an independent, William Wedd.
- 2 September – The Douglas DC-3 Lutana crashes near Nundle, New South Wales, killing all 13 on board.
- 21 September – H.V. Evatt becomes President of the United Nations General Assembly.
- 29 November – The first Holden car, the model 48-215, popularly known as the FX, rolls off the assembly line. The on-road cost was approximately £760.
- 1 December – The body of an unidentified man is found on a beach in Adelaide, becoming known as the Somerton Man.
- 16 December – HMAS Sydney is commissioned into the Royal Australian Navy as its first aircraft carrier.

== Arts and literature ==
- William Dobell wins the Archibald Prize with his portrait of Margaret Olley
- One of the few Australian songs to top the Australian charts "Good-Night Mister Moon" by Allan Ryan and William Flynn

== Sport ==
- 18 September – Minor premiers Western Suburbs win the 1948 NSWRFL season, claiming their first premiership since 1934 after defeating Balmain 8–5. North Sydney finish in last place, claiming the wooden spoon.
- Morna takes line honours and Westward wins on handicap in the Sydney to Hobart Yacht Race
- Rimfire wins the Melbourne Cup

== Births ==
- 5 January – Wally Foreman, football commentator (died 2006)
- 23 January – Glenn Wheatley, musician and talent manager (died 2022)
- 24 January – Brian Langton, NSW politician (died 2023)
- 25 January – Ros Kelly, politician
- 3 February – Les Twentyman, social campaigner (died 2024)
- 10 February – Mike Pratt, politician
- 16 February – Jeff Guess, poet
- 2 March – Jeff Kennett, Premier of Victoria (1992–1999)
- 13 March – Rick Amor, artist
- 19 March – Vince Lovegrove, singer, journalist and band manager (died 2012)
- 27 March – Rosemary Follett, Chief Minister of the Australian Capital Territory (1989, 1991–1995)
- 31 March – Graham Cornes, Australian rules footballer
- 2 April – Jennifer Rowe, children's author
- 29 April – Leslie Howard, musician
- 15 May – Muriel Porter, Anglican laywoman
- 28 May – Michael Field, Premier of Tasmania (1989–1992)
- 11 June – Pat Wilson, singer and journalist
- 21 June – Lionel Rose, boxer (died 2011)
- 30 June – Galarrwuy Yunupingu, Aboriginal leader (died 2023)
- 15 July – Richard Franklin, film director (died 2007)
- 24 July – Joan London, writer
- 7 August – Greg Chappell, cricketer
- 18 August – Richard Tracey, Australian military and civil judge and barrister (died 2019)
- 19 August – Robert Hughes, actor
- 20 August – John Noble, actor
- 24 August - Richard Norden, soldier and police officer (died 1972)
- 12 September – Max Walker, cricketer and VFL footballer (died 2016)
- 18 September – Christopher Skase, fugitive businessman (died 2001)
- 22 September – Denis Burke, Chief Minister of the Northern Territory (1999–2001)
- 25 September – Vicki Viidikas, poet (died 1998)
- 26 September – Olivia Newton-John, entertainer (died 2022)
- 3 October – Rob Langer, cricketer (died 2023)
- 4 October – Bob Morris, racing driver
- 5 October – Jim Waley, journalist
- 8 October – Warren Truss, leader of the National Party
- 19 October – Meg Lees, Democrat senator for South Australia
- 30 October – Garry McDonald, actor
- 5 November – Malcolm Milne, Olympic skier
- 6 November – Geoff Prosser, politician
- 14 November – Ian Stanley, golfer (died 2018)
- 15 November – James Kemsley, cartoonist (died 2007)
- 22 November – Gary Dempsey, Australian rules footballer
- 1 December – John Quigley, WA politician
- 2 December – Patricia Hewitt, British Labour Party politician
- 5 December – Cheryl Kernot, politician
- 12 December – Kim Beazley, politician
- 15 December – Cassandra Harris, actor (died 1991)
- 29 December – Michael White, psychotherapist (died 2008)

== Deaths ==
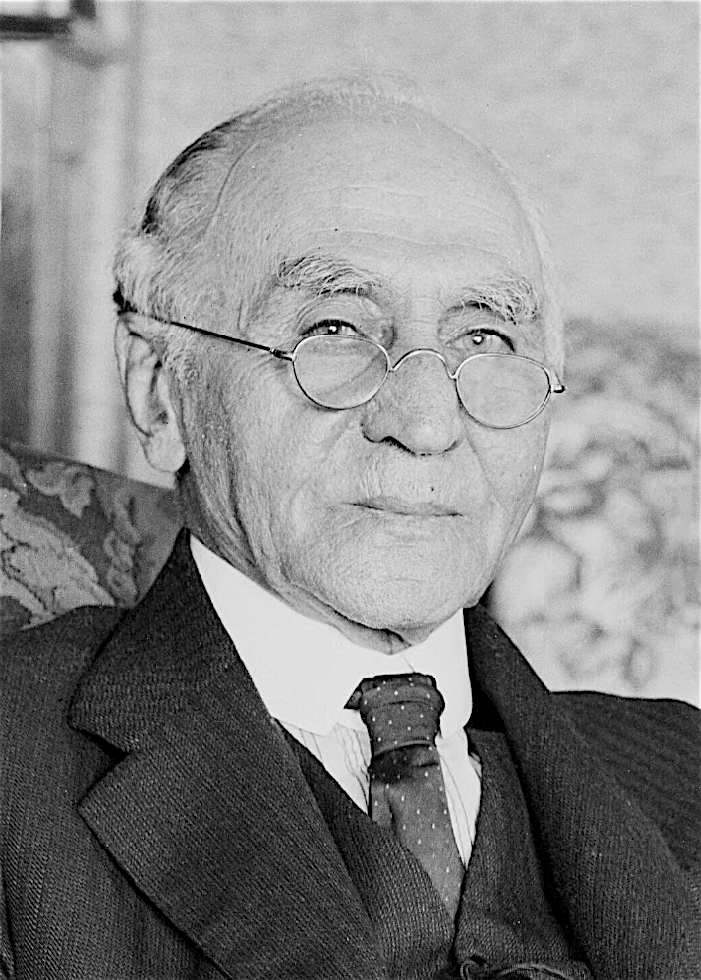
Sir Isaac Isaacs

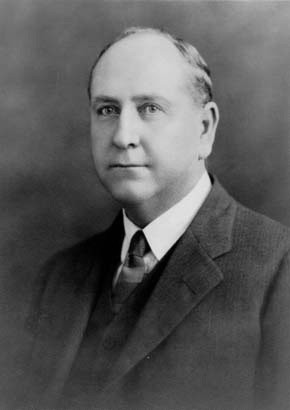
Philip Collier

- 12 February – Sir Isaac Isaacs, 9th Governor-General of Australia and 3rd Chief Justice of Australia (b. 1855)
- 23 March – Lou Cunningham, New South Wales politician (b. 1889)
- 24 March – Sydney Sampson, Victorian politician and newspaper proprietor (b. 1863)
- 9 April – George Carpenter, 5th General of The Salvation Army (b. 1872)
- 15 April – Eric Fairweather Harrison, Victorian politician and soldier (b. 1880)
- 20 May – Marie Pitt, poet and journalist (b. 1869)
- 8 June – Thomas Crawford, Queensland politician (b. 1865)
- 18 June – Edward Brooker, 31st Premier of Tasmania (born in the United Kingdom) (b. 1891)
- 18 July – May Moss, welfare worker and suffragette (b. 1869)
- 21 July – Francis Joseph Bayldon, master mariner and nautical instructor (born in the United Kingdom) (b. 1872)
- 24 July – Stanley Goble, 2nd Chief of the Air Staff (b. 1891)
- 31 July – Nigel Barker, Olympic track and field athlete (b. 1883)
- 28 August – Jack Lumsdaine, singer, songwriter and soldier (b. 1895)
- 2 September – Margaret McIntyre, Tasmanian politician (b. 1886)
- 9 September – Frank Foster, New South Wales politician (b. 1872)
- 18 October
  - George Cann, New South Wales politician (born in the United Kingdom) (b. 1871)
  - Philip Collier, 14th Premier of Western Australia (b. 1873)
- 8 December – Matthew Charlton, 7th Federal Leader of the Opposition (b. 1866)

== See also ==
- List of Australian films of the 1940s
