= 1947 in Australia =

- Monarch: George VI
- Governor-General: Prince Henry, Duke of Gloucester, then William McKell
- Prime minister: Ben Chifley
- Population: 7,579,358
- Elections: VIC, NSW, QLD, WA, SA

The following lists events that happened during 1947 in Australia.

- Decades: 1920s; 1930s; 1940s; 1950s; 1960s
- See also: 1947 in Australian literature; Other events of 1947; Timeline of Australian history

== Incumbents ==
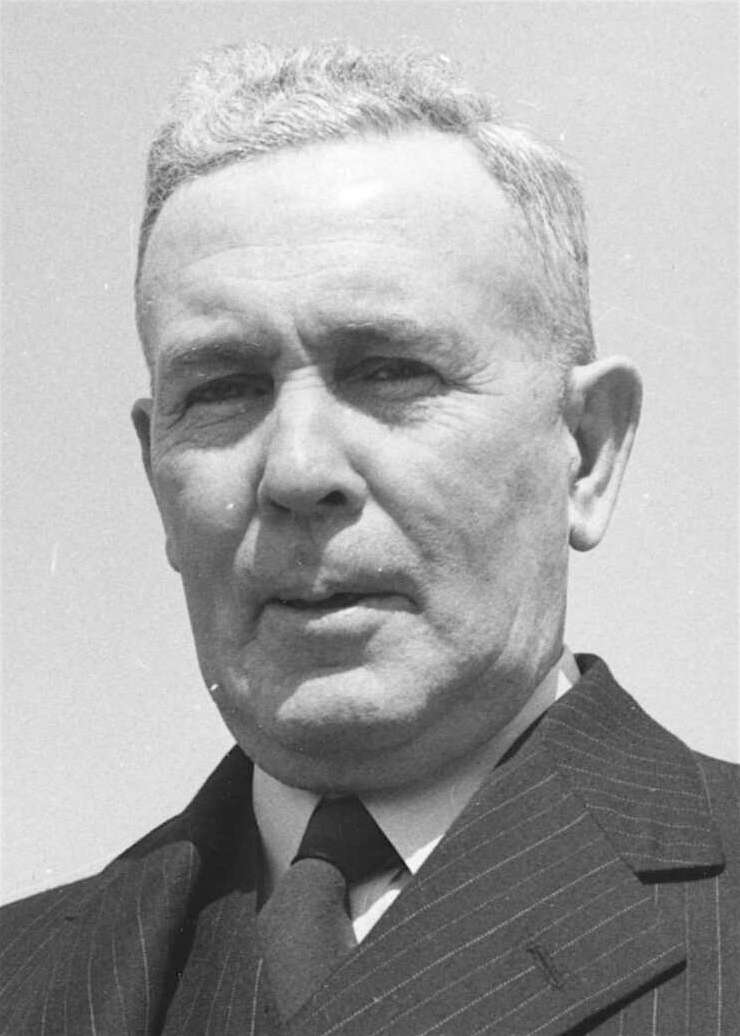
Ben Chifley

- Monarch – George VI
- Governor-General – Prince Henry, Duke of Gloucester (until 11 March), then William McKell
- Prime Minister – Ben Chifley
- Chief Justice – Sir John Latham

=== State Premiers ===
- Premier of New South Wales – William McKell (until 6 February), then James McGirr
- Premier of Queensland – Ned Hanlon
- Premier of South Australia – Thomas Playford IV
- Premier of Tasmania – Robert Cosgrove (until 18 December), then Edward Brooker
- Premier of Victoria – John Cain (until 20 November), then Thomas Hollway
- Premier of Western Australia – Frank Wise (until 1 April), then Ross McLarty

=== State Governors ===
- Governor of New South Wales – Sir John Northcott
- Governor of Queensland – Sir John Lavarack
- Governor of South Australia – Sir Charles Norrie
- Governor of Tasmania – Sir Hugh Binney
- Governor of Victoria – Sir Winston Dugan
- Governor of Western Australia – none appointed

== Events ==
- 1 January – A massive hailstorm strikes Sydney, causing hundreds of injuries and an estimated £1 million damage.
- 6 February – William McKell stands down as Premier of New South Wales following royal approval of his appointment as Governor-General. The Labor Party elects James McGirr as its leader and the new Premier.
- 15 March – A state election is held in Western Australia. The Labor government of Frank Wise is defeated by the Liberal/Country coalition led by Ross McLarty.
- 3 May – A state election is held in Queensland. Ned Hanlon's Labor government is returned for its sixth term in government.
- 1 April – The Woomera rocket range is established in South Australia as a testing site for British and Australian missiles.
- 5 May – A train derails in the Camp Mountain rail accident in Queensland, killing 16 people.
- 15–17 June – Major flooding in Tasmania.
- 30 June – The Australian government assumes control of Qantas.
- 1 July – Real estate company L. J. Hooker is listed on the Australian Stock Exchange.
- 5 August – Australia becomes a member of the International Monetary Fund.
- 30 August – The Commonwealth Court of Conciliation and Arbitration grants workers a 40-hour week.
- 8 November – A state election is held in Victoria, after the upper house blocks supply. The Labor minority government of John Cain is defeated by a Liberal–Country coalition led by Thomas Hollway.
- 18 November – Australia reduces its trade tariffs after ratifying the General Agreement on Tariffs and Trade (GATT) in Geneva.
- 18 December – Robert Cosgrove resigns as Premier of Tasmania after being indicted on charges of bribery and corruption. Edward Brooker is sworn in as his replacement the next day.
- 26 December – Heard Island and McDonald Islands in Antarctica are transferred from British control to Australian territories.

== Arts and literature ==
- 17 January – William Dargie wins the Archibald Prize with his portrait of Marcus Clarke.

== Sport ==
- 30 August – Fred Fanning, in his last league match, kicks a VFL/AFL record of eighteen goals against St. Kilda
- 20 September – Balmain win the 1947 NSWRFL season, claiming their tenth title after defeating minor premiers Canterbury-Bankstown 13–9. The newly formed Parramatta team finish in last place, claiming the wooden spoon.
- 27 September – Carlton 13.8 (86) defeats Essendon 11.19 85 to win the 51st VFL Premiership in the 1947 VFL Grand Final.
- 4 November – Hiraji wins the Melbourne Cup.
- 30 December – Morna takes line honours and Westward wins on handicap in the Sydney to Hobart Yacht Race.
- The Parramatta rugby league club is formed in Sydney's West. The Manly-Warringah club is also formed in the Northern Beaches.

== Births ==
- 10 January
  - David Irvine, diplomat, Director-General of ASIS and ASIO (died 2022)
  - Stevie Wright, English-Australian singer-songwriter (died 2015)
- 29 January – Lorraine Landon, basketball administrator, former player and coach
- 8 February – Kerrie Biddell, singer and pianist (died 2014)
- 8 April – Fay Miller, politician (died 2023)
- 15 May – Graeham Goble, musician
- 19 May – David Helfgott, concert pianist
- 29 May – Stan Zemanek, Australian radio broadcaster (died 2007)
- 3 June – Mike Burgmann, racing driver and accountant (died 1986)
- 19 June – James Mason, field hockey player
- 23 June – Bryan Brown, actor
- 25 June – Robert Percy, Australian rules footballer
- 14 July – John Blackman, radio and television presenter (died 2024)
- 16 July – Don Burke, Television presenter, television producer, author, and horticulturist
- 28 July – Peter Cosgrove, Chief of the Defence Force (2002–05)
- 5 August – Angry Anderson, singer and actor (died 2026)
- 28 August – Jennie George, politician and trade unionist
- 5 September – Bruce Yardley, Test cricketer (died 2019)
- 25 September – Barrie Robran, Australian rules footballer (died 2025)
- 28 September – Bob Carr, Premier of New South Wales (1995–2005); Senator and Minister for Foreign Affairs (2012–13)
- 2 November – David Ahern, composer (died 1988)
- 4 November – Rod Marsh, cricketer (died 2022)
- 28 December
  - Dick Diamonde, bass guitarist (died 2024)
  - Andrew Olle, television and radio broadcaster (died 1995)

== Deaths ==
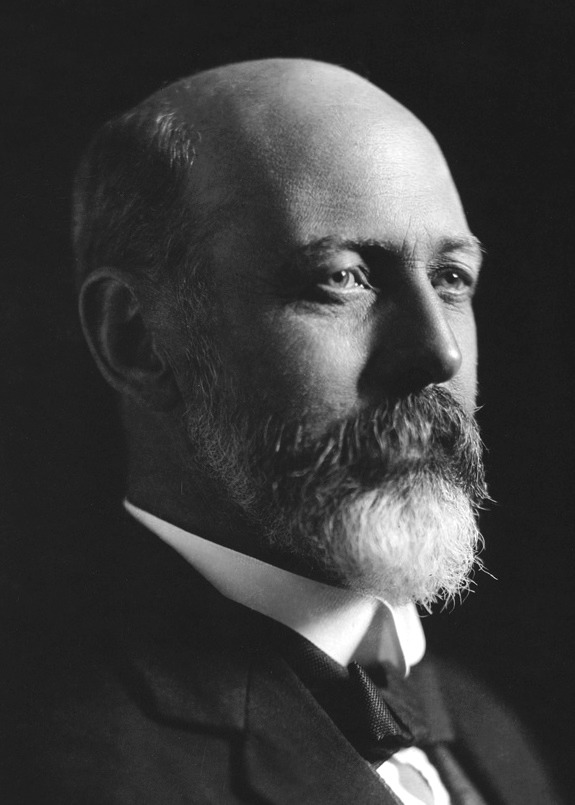
Sir Joseph Cook

- 16 January – Traugott Bernhard Zwar, academic, army medical officer and surgeon (b. 1876)
- 27 February – Charles Hoadley, geologist (b. 1887)
- 26 April – Hector Lamond, New South Wales politician (b. 1865)
- 27 April
  - Robert Barr, Victorian politician (born in the United Kingdom) (b. 1862)
  - Roland Green, New South Wales politician (b. 1885)
- 9 May – Hugh de Largie, Western Australian politician (born in the United Kingdom) (b. 1859)
- 16 May – William McCormack, 22nd Premier of Queensland (b. 1879)
- 25 May – Rupert Bunny, painter (b. 1864)
- 28 May – Walter Duncan, New South Wales politician (b. 1883)
- 1 July – E. Harold Davies, musician, conductor and teacher (born in the United Kingdom) (b. 1867)
- 30 July – Sir Joseph Cook, 6th Prime Minister of Australia (b. 1860)
- 28 August – Matthew Reid, Queensland politician (born in the United Kingdom) (b. 1856)
- 14 September – John Feetham, Anglican bishop (born in the United Kingdom) (b. 1873)
- 26 October – Jack Bailey, New South Wales politician (b. 1871)
- 19 December – Arthur Wilson, Australian rules footballer, gynaecologist and obstetrician (b. 1888)

== See also ==
- List of Australian films of the 1940s
