= 1944 in Australia =

- Monarch: George VI
- Governor-General: Alexander Hore-Ruthven, 1st Earl of Gowrie
- Prime minister: John Curtin
- Population: 7,309,711
- Elections: SA, QLD, NSW

The following lists events that happened during 1944 in Australia.

- Decades: 1920s; 1930s; 1940s; 1950s; 1960s
- See also: 1944 in Australian literature; Other events of 1944; Timeline of Australian history

== Incumbents ==
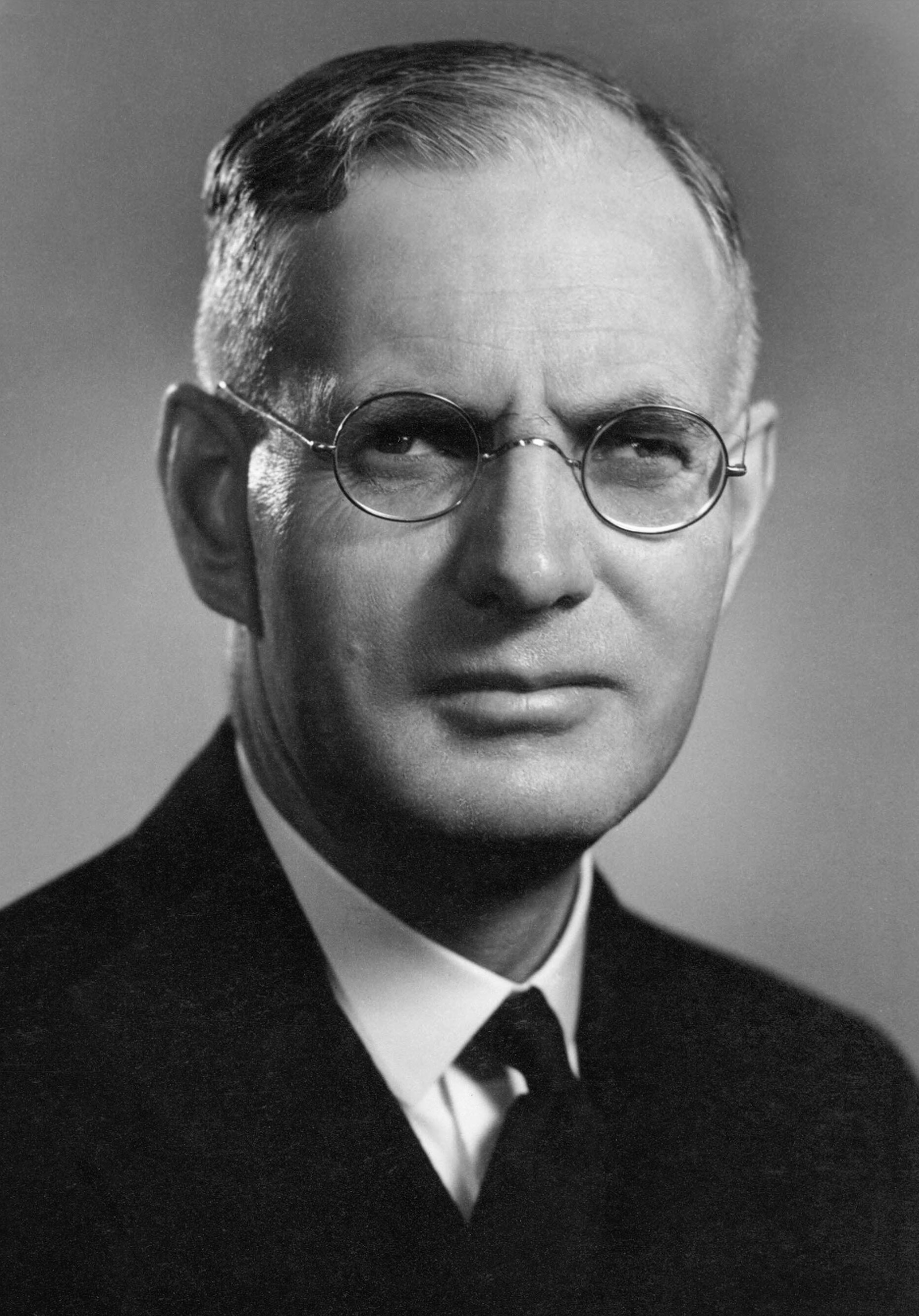
John Curtin

- Monarch – George VI
- Governor-General – Alexander Hore-Ruthven, 1st Baron Gowrie
- Prime Minister – John Curtin
- Chief Justice – Sir John Latham

=== State Premiers ===
- Premier of New South Wales – William McKell
- Premier of Queensland – Frank Cooper
- Premier of South Australia – Thomas Playford
- Premier of Tasmania – Robert Cosgrove
- Premier of Victoria – Albert Dunstan
- Premier of Western Australia – John Willcock

=== State Governors ===
- Governor of New South Wales – John Loder, 2nd Baron Wakehurst
- Governor of Queensland – Sir Leslie Orme Wilson
- Governor of South Australia – Sir Malcolm Barclay-Harvey (until 26 April), then Sir Charles Norrie (from 19 December)
- Governor of Tasmania – Sir Ernest Clark
- Governor of Victoria – Sir Winston Dugan
- Governor of Western Australia – none appointed

== Events ==
- 14 January – Meat rationing begins in Australia.
- 20 January – Seventeen people are killed at Brooklyn, New South Wales when a mail train and a bus collide at a level crossing. There is only one survivor, Gloria Iren Silvia.
- 15 February – Bushfires in the Western District, Gippsland and Yallourn regions of Victoria kill 51 people.
- 15 April – Fred Paterson is elected to the Parliament of Queensland, representing the seat of Bowen. He remains the only member of the Communist Party of Australia to ever be elected to an Australian Parliament.
- 30 June – Sydney waiter Antonio Agostini is sentenced to six years prison for the manslaughter of his wife, Linda Agostini, in what was known as the "Pyjama Girl" murder.
- 5 August – The Cowra breakout occurs, with 545 Japanese prisoners of war escaping from the camp.
- 19 August – A referendum is held, concerning Post-War Reconstruction and Democratic Rights. It proposes to grant the government power to legislate over 14 points of law for a five-year period. The referendum, asked in a single question, is not carried.
- 21 October – The heavy cruiser HMAS Australia, operating in the Philippines, is hit by a kamikaze aircraft, killing 20 and wounding 54, in what is believed to be the first attack of its kind.
- 25 November – Reg Saunders becomes the first Aboriginal commissioned officer in the Australian Army.
- 14 December – The Liberal Party of Australia is formed, replacing the United Australia Party.

== Arts and literature ==
- Ern Malley poems first published, revealing a major Australian literary hoax.
- Joshua Smith wins the Archibald Prize with his portrait of Sol Rosevear

== Film ==
- The film of the story of The Rats of Tobruk is released, directed by Charles Chauvel

== Sport ==
- 29 July - North Melbourne (11.21.87) beat Richmond (14.2.86) in the only VFL/AFL match where the winning team scored three fewer goals
- 26 August - Newtown beat St. George 55–7 in the most one-sided NSWRFL/NSWRL/ARL/NRL final in history.
- 16 September – Balmain win the 1944 NSWRFL season, defeating Newtown 12–8 in the grand final. Canterbury-Bankstown finish in last place, claiming the wooden spoon for the second year in a row.
- Sirius wins the Melbourne Cup

== Births ==
- 1 January – Barry Beath, rugby league player
- 7 January – Tony Whitlam, lawyer, judge, and politician
- 14 January – Graham Marsh, golfer
- 18 January – Paul Keating, Prime Minister of Australia (1991–1996)
- 19 January – Paul Gibson, NSW politician
- 3 February – Trisha Noble, singer and actress (died 2021)
- 9 February – Derryn Hinch, media personality (born in New Zealand)(died 2026)
- 10 February – Peter Allen, entertainer (died 1992)
- 17 February – Robert Dessaix, writer
- 18 March – Dick Smith, businessman
- 21 April – Adrian Hurley, basketball player and coach
- 22 April – Damien Broderick, science fiction author (died 2025)
- 4 May – Steve Liebmann, journalist
- 22 May – John Flanagan, author (died 2026)
- 23 May – John Newcombe, tennis player
- 26 May – Andrew Jones, politician (died 2015)
- 28 May – Paul D. Scully-Power, oceanographer and astronaut
- 6 June – Matt Carroll, film and television producer
- 6 June – Rene Rivkin, businessman (died 2005)
- 7 June – Neil Andrew, federal politician and former Speaker of the Australian House of Representatives (died 2026)
- 4 July – Ray Meagher, actor
- 23 July – Alex Buzo, playwright and author (died 2006)
- 31 July – James Strong, businessman, CEO of Qantas (died 2013)
- 17 August – Nicholas John Vine-Hall, genealogist (died 2006)
- 21 August – Peter Weir, film director
- 3 September – Ray Groom, Premier of Tasmania (1992–1996)
- 8 September – Terry Jenner, cricketer (died 2011)
- 5 September – Gareth Evans, politician
- 11 September – Alan Gilbert, academic and university Vice-Chancellor (died 2010)
- 13 September – Midget Farrelly, surfer (died 2016)
- 16 September – Peter Harvey, journalist and television presenter (died 2013)
- 19 September – Colin Dibley, tennis player
- 25 October – Ron Coote, rugby league footballer
- 21 November – Kay Patterson, Liberal Senator for Victoria
- 4 December – Lawrie Peckham, high jumper
- 20 December – Ray Martin, television presenter (60 Minutes – 1979–1985, A Current Affair – 1994–1998 & 2003–3005, Midday – 1985–1993)
- 27 December – Bob Brown, politician

== Deaths ==
- 1 January – Charles Turner, cricketer (b. 1862)
- 3 January – Tom Brennan, Victorian politician, journalist and lawyer (b. 1866)
- 15 January – Patrick Lynch, Western Australian politician (born in Ireland) (b. 1867)
- 31 March – Maurice Blackburn, Victorian politician (b. 1880)
- 10 April – Constance Kent, convicted murderer (born in the United Kingdom) (b. 1844)
- 5 May – George John Bell, Tasmanian politician (b. 1872)
- 10 May – Digby Denham, 18th Premier of Queensland (born in the United Kingdom) (b. 1859)
- 11 May – John Balmer, air force bomber pilot (died in Belgium) (b. 1910)
- 24 May – William Butcher, Western Australian politician and pastoralist (b. 1858)
- 9 June – William Angwin, Western Australian politician (born in the United Kingdom) (b. 1863)
- 28 June – Anton Breinl, medical scientist and practitioner (born in Austria) (b. 1880)
- 1 July – Zara Aronson, journalist and philanthropist (b. 1864)
- 29 July – Walter Price, cricketer (b. 1886)
- 5 August
  - Ralph Jones, soldier and recipient of the George Cross (born in the United Kingdom) (b. 1900)
  - Benjamin Gower Hardy, soldier and recipient of the George Cross (b. 1898)
- 24 August – Alfred Carson, journalist and social worker (b. 1859)
- 6 September – Evelyn Conyers, matron-in-chief of the Australian Army Nursing Service, awarded the Florence Nightingale Medal (born in New Zealand) (b. 1870)
- 21 October – Emile Dechaineux, naval officer (died in Leyte Gulf) (b. 1902)
- 5 November – Grace Benny, South Australian politician (b. 1872)
- 10 November – John Clemons, Tasmanian politician and lawyer (died in the United Kingdom) (b. 1862)
- 12 November – Roy Agnew, composer and pianist (b. 1891)
- 18 November – Sir James Blair, 6th Chief Justice of Queensland (b. 1870)
- 20 November – Charles Frederick Cox, New South Wales politician and military officer (b. 1863)
- 12 December – Claude Corbett, sports journalist (b. 1885)

== See also ==
- List of Australian films of the 1940s
