= 1943 in Australia =

- Monarch: George VI
- Governor-General: Alexander Hore-Ruthven, 1st Earl of Gowrie
- Prime minister: John Curtin
- Population: 7,234,904
- Elections: Federal, WA, VIC

The following lists events that happened during 1943 in Australia.

- Decades: 1920s; 1930s; 1940s; 1950s; 1960s
- See also: 1943 in Australian literature; Other events of 1943; Federal election; Timeline of Australian history

== Incumbents ==
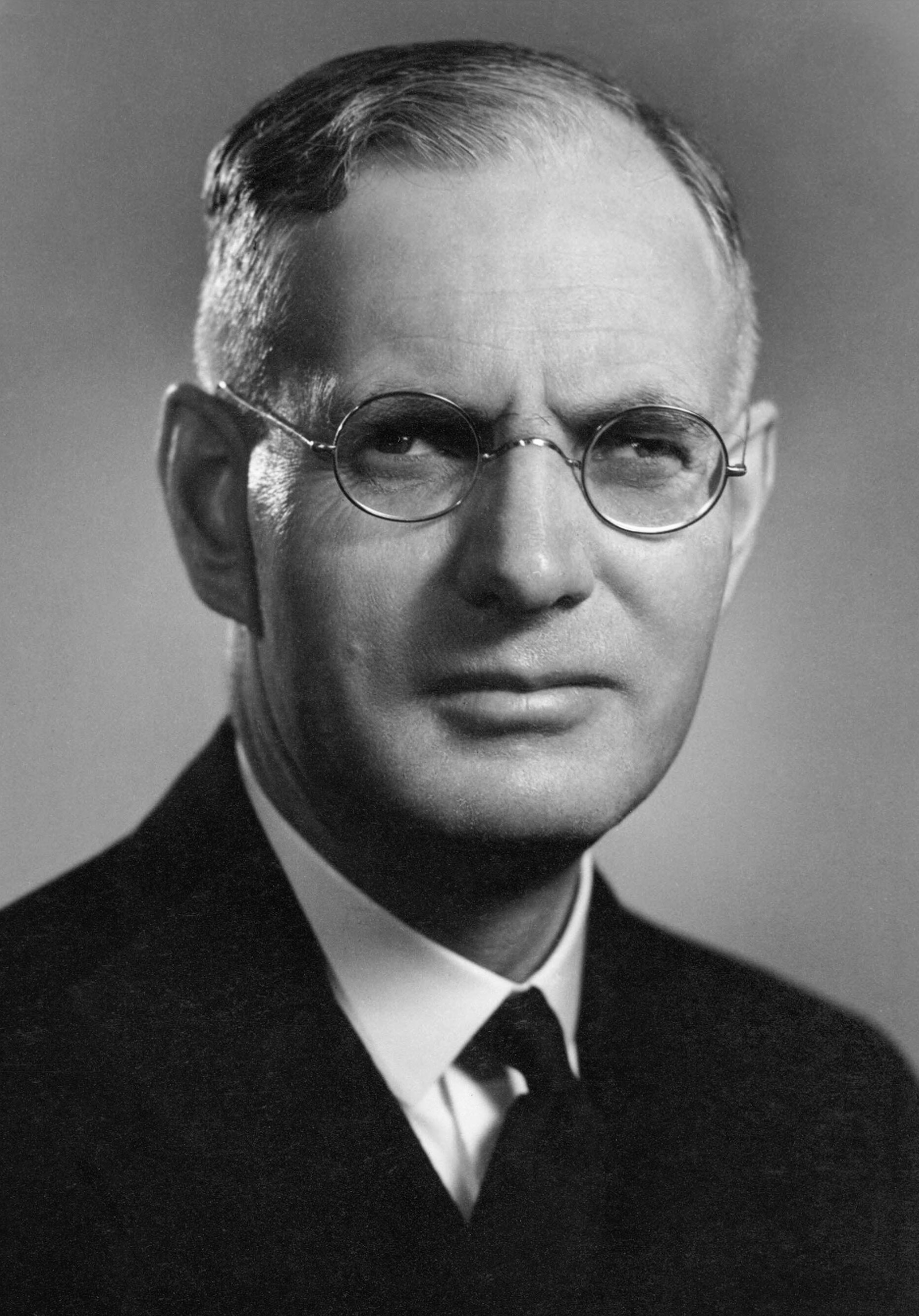
John Curtin

- Monarch – George VI
- Governor-General – Alexander Hore-Ruthven, 1st Baron Gowrie
- Prime Minister – John Curtin
- Chief Justice – Sir John Latham

=== State Premiers ===
- Premier of New South Wales – William McKell
- Premier of Queensland – Frank Cooper
- Premier of South Australia – Thomas Playford IV
- Premier of Tasmania – Robert Cosgrove
- Premier of Victoria – Albert Dunstan (until 14 September), then John Cain I (until 18 September), then Albert Dunstan
- Premier of Western Australia – John Willcock

=== State Governors ===
- Governor of New South Wales – John Loder, 2nd Baron Wakehurst
- Governor of Queensland – Sir Leslie Orme Wilson
- Governor of South Australia – Sir Malcolm Barclay-Harvey
- Governor of Tasmania – Sir Ernest Clark
- Governor of Victoria – Sir Winston Dugan
- Governor of Western Australia – none appointed

== Events ==
- 3 March – A Soviet embassy is established in Canberra, and an Australian diplomat is posted to Moscow as ambassador.
- 14 May – The hospital ship AHS Centaur is torpedoed by a Japanese submarine off North Stradbroke Island in Queensland, killing 268 people.
- 12 June – A general election is held in Victoria.
- 21 August – A federal election is held. The incumbent Australian Labor Party government led by John Curtin is returned to power.
- 23 September – Enid Lyons and Dorothy Tangney become the first women to win seats in the Parliament of Australia. Lyons represents the Tasmanian electorate of Darwin in the House of Representatives, and Tangney is a Senator for Western Australia.
- 27 December – 7 people are injured in Seaspray, Victoria after a wire on an RAAF plane fails to retract.

== Arts and literature ==
- William Dobell wins the Archibald Prize with his portrait of Joshua Smith

== Film ==
- 4 March – Damien Parer wins Australia's first Academy Award (Best Documentary Feature) for the film Kokoda Front Line.

== Sport ==
- 4 September – Newtown win the 1943 NSWRFL season, defeating North Sydney 34–7 in the premiership final. Canterbury-Bankstown finish in last place on points difference, claiming the wooden spoon.
- Dark Felt wins the Melbourne Cup

== Births ==
- 5 January – Mary Gaudron, High Court judge (died 2026)
- 9 January – Robert Drewe, journalist and writer
- 29 January – Molly Meldrum, journalist, critic, and producer (died 2026)
- 8 February – Malcolm Donnelly, opera singer
- 1 March – Dyson Heydon, High Court judge
- 12 March – Philip Ruddock, politician
- 14 March – Aila Keto, environmentalist
- 19 March – Vern Schuppan, racing driver
- 22 March – Brian Austin, politician
- 6 April – Chris Gallus, politician
- 9 April – Brian James, rugby league player (died 2020)
- 11 April – Judith Adams, Liberal Senator for South Australia (died 2012)
- 26 April – David Combe, political lobbyist (died 2019)
- 29 April – John Tranter, poet (died 2023)
- 30 April – Paul Jennings, children's author
- 2 May
  - Geoffrey Edelsten, medical entrepreneur (died 2021)
  - John Goss, racing driver
- 7 May
  - John Bannon, Premier of South Australia (1982–1992) (died 2015)
  - Peter Carey, novelist
- 17 May – Johnny Warren, soccer player and coach (died 2004)
- 19 May – Bob Graham, NSW politician
- 1 June – Ian King, cricketer
- 4 June – John Burgess, TV & radio host (Wheel of Fortune & Burgo's Catch Phrase)
- 11 June – Ray Warren, rugby league commentator
- 19 June – Barry Hill, historian and writer
- 3 July – Judith Durham, singer (The Seekers) (died 2022)
- 11 July – Richard Carleton, television journalist (died 2006)
- 25 July – Desmond Mueller, Vice Chief of the Defence Force (2000–2002)
- 26 July – Robyn Woodhouse, high jumper (died 2026)
- 18 August – Jean Roberts, Olympic shot putter and discus thrower (died 2024)
- 5 September – Jack Charles, actor and Aboriginal elder (died 2022)
- 16 September
  - Bob Debus, politician
  - Alan Ferguson, Liberal Senator for South Australia
- 22 September – Dale Spender, feminist scholar, teacher, writer and consultant (died 2023)
- 26 September – Ian Chappell, cricketer
- 4 October – Owen Davidson, tennis player (died 2023)
- 6 October – Peter Dowding, Premier of Western Australia (1988–1990)
- 9 October – Dianne Burge, Olympic sprinter (died 2024)
- 6 November – Ian Turpie, TV host & singer (The New Price Is Right) (died 2012)
- 8 November – Peter Cook, politician (died 2005)
- 23 November – Tony Bonner, actor
- 25 November – Jan Andrew, Olympic swimmer
- 29 November – Janet Holmes à Court, businesswoman
- 19 December – Jimmy Mackay, soccer player (died 1998)

== Deaths ==
- 3 January – Sir Walter James, 5th Premier of Western Australia (b. 1863)
- 8 January – Richard Hillary, fighter pilot and author (died in the United Kingdom) (b. 1919)
- 14 February – Alice Henry, suffragist, journalist and trade unionist (b. 1857)
- 7 March – Alma Moodie, violinist and educator (died in Germany) (b. 1898)
- 28 March – Keith Truscott, Australian rules footballer (Melbourne) and fighter pilot (b. 1916)
- 29 March – William Ellis Newton, soldier and Victoria Cross recipient (died in New Guinea) (b. 1919)
- 25 April – Sir Arthur Cocks, New South Wales politician (b. 1862)
- 19 May – Billy Sing, soldier (b. 1886)
- 25 May – Albert Robinson, South Australian politician (b. 1877)
- 14 June – John McNeill, Victorian politician (b. 1868)
- 28 June – Pietro Porcelli, sculptor (born in Italy) (b. 1872)
- 21 July
  - Edward Riley, New South Wales politician (born in the United Kingdom) (b. 1859)
  - David O'Keefe, Tasmanian politician (b. 1864)
- 6 August – Tom Garrett, cricketer (b. 1858)
- 20 August – Sir William Irvine, 21st Premier of Victoria and 5th Chief Justice of Victoria (born in Ireland) (b. 1858)
- 1 September – Sir Arthur Streeton, artist (b. 1867)
- 23 September – John Bradfield, engineer (b. 1867)
- 2 October – Sir John Evans, 21st Premier of Tasmania (born in the United Kingdom) (b. 1855)
- 14 October – Jimmy Matthews, cricketer (b. 1884)
- 15 October – Thomas Henry Dodds, soldier (born in the United Kingdom) (b. 1873)
- 23 October – Sir George Fairbairn, Victorian politician (b. 1855)
- 6 November – William Lister Lister, artist (b. 1859)
- 9 November – Reginald Spencer Browne, soldier, journalist and newspaper editor (b. 1856)
- 22 November – Thomas Ryan, trade unionist and politician (born in Ireland) (b. 1870)
- 23 November – Ernie Jones, cricketer and Australian rules footballer (Port Adelaide) (b. 1869)
- 27 November – Louis Esson, poet and playwright (born in the United Kingdom) (b. 1878)
- 10 December – Frederick Chapman, palaeontologist (born in the United Kingdom) (b. 1864)

== See also ==
- List of Australian films of the 1940s
