= National Health Act 1953 =

Parliament of Australia
- Long title: An Act relating to the provision of pharmaceutical, sickness and hospital benefits, and of medical and dental services
- Citation: No. 95 of 1953 or No. 95, 1953 as amended
- Territorial extent: States and territories of Australia
- Royal assent: 18 December 1953
- Status: In force

The National Health Act 1953 (Cth) is an Act of the Parliament of Australia, which administers pharmaceutical, sickness and hospital benefits, alongside medical and dental services. The Act was passed in 1953 in the Fifth Menzies Ministry, under the second Menzies Government, with its "chief architect" being the then Minister for Health, Earle Page.

As of 2014 provisions in the Act relating to the Pharmaceutical Benefits Scheme are still part of Australian law.

== See also ==
- List of acts of the Parliament of Australia
