= 1946 Australian referendum (Social Services) =

Australian referendum about social services

1946 Australian Commonwealth Power in Social Affairs referendum
- 28 September 1946
- Do you approve of the proposed law for the alteration of the Constitution entitled — "Constitution Alteration (Social Services) 1946" ?

Results
| Choice | Votes | % |
|---|---|---|
| Yes | 2,297,934 | 54.39% |
| No | 1,927,148 | 45.61% |
| Valid votes | 4,225,082 | 94.86% |
| Invalid or blank votes | 228,859 | 5.14% |
| Total votes | 4,453,941 | 100.00% |
| Registered voters/turnout | 4,739,853 | 93.97% |

The Constitution Alteration (Social Services) Bill 1946, was a successful proposal to alter the Australian Constitution to give the Commonwealth power over a range of social services. The question was put to a referendum in the 1946 Australian referendum with two other (unrelated) questions. It was carried and inserted into section 51 of the Australian Constitution.

== Question ==
Do you approve of the proposed law for the alteration of the Constitution entitled 'Constitution Alteration (Social Services) 1946'?

== Proposed Changes to the Constitution ==
Section 51 of the Australian Constitution grants the commonwealth legislative power. Prior to this amendment the only social services provision was s51(xxiii) that gave power to legislate for invalid and old-age pensions. The proposal was to introduce s51(xxiiiA), which reads:

(xxiiiA) the provision of maternity allowances, widows' pensions, child endowment, unemployment, pharmaceutical, sickness and hospital benefits, medical and dental services (but not so as to authorize any form of civil conscription), benefits to students and family allowances;

== Background ==
Federal legislation already existed on a number of these issues despite the lack of a clear constitutional basis: child endowment payments were introduced in 1941, widow's pensions in 1942, and unemployment benefits in 1945. These payments were based on the spending power (s81). However, in the first Pharmaceutical Benefits Case constitutional questions were raised about the validity of Commonwealth social security legislation based on s81. The High Court held that the Pharmaceutical Benefits Act 1944, which sought to introduce a scheme of subsidised medications, was unconstitutional because it was not supported by a section 51 head of power and could not be supported by s81.

The amendment was therefore intended to clarify and enshrine the existence of a power that was already being exercised and received bipartisan support. This perhaps explains why this amendment was carried, given that it was already accepted as an area of Commonwealth activity. In addition, a "no" vote could have ended welfare programs from which voters were benefiting.

=== Civil conscription ===
Compulsory military service had existed in Australia since the passage of the Defence Act 1903, however this was restricted to times of war and to service within Australia. Thus the proposal in the 1916 and 1917 conscription referendums were that the parliament exercise the power to conscript civilians for military service outside Australia.

In 1920 the Parliament of the United Kingdom passed the Emergency Powers Act 1920 which stated that the regulations could not impose "any form of compulsory military service or industrial conscription". The exclusion of "industrial conscription" was picked up in Australia in the Public Safety Preservation Act 1923 (Vic), the Section 5 of the National Security Act 1939 (Cth) and the National Emergency Act 1941 (NSW).

The exclusion of conscription was not part of the government bill, unlike the Constitution Alteration (Industrial Employment) Bill which excluded "any form of industrial conscription". The Leader of the Opposition, Robert Menzies, criticised the social services proposal as including the power to nationalize the medical and dental professions "by making all doctors and dentists members of one government service which had a monopoly of medical and dental treatment". 4 days later Menzies proposed that the words "(but not so as to authorize any form of civil conscription)" be added to the bill, stating that he had borrowed the form of words from the Industrial Employment Bill, and the amendment was accepted by the government as protecting the medical and dental professions from conscription.

== Results ==
Result (Note: Handbook of the 44th Parliament (2014) "Part 5 - Referendums and Plebiscites - Referendum results". Parliamentary Library of Australia.)
| State | Electoral roll | Ballots issued | For | | Against | | Informal |
| State | Electoral roll | Ballots issued | Vote | % | Vote | % | Informal |
|---|---|---|---|---|---|---|---|
| New South Wales | 1,858,749 | 1,757,150 | 897,887 | 54.00 | 764,723 | 46.00 | 94,540 |
| Victoria | 1,345,537 | 1,261,374 | 671,967 | 55.98 | 528,452 | 44.02 | 60,955 |
| Queensland | 660,316 | 612,170 | 299,205 | 51.26 | 284,465 | 48.74 | 28,500 |
| South Australia | 420,361 | 399,301 | 197,395 | 51.73 | 184,172 | 48.27 | 17,734 |
| Western Australia | 300,337 | 279,066 | 164,017 | 62.26 | 99,412 | 37.74 | 15,637 |
| Tasmania | 154,553 | 144,880 | 67,463 | 50.58 | 65,924 | 49.42 | 11,493 |
| Armed forces (Note: Armed forces totals are also included in their respective states.) | | 37,021 | 22,824 | | 13,211 | | 986 |
| Total for Commonwealth | 4,739,853 | 4,453,941 | 2,297,934 | 54.39 | 1,927,148 | 45.61 | 228,859 |
| Results | Obtained majority in six states and an overall majority of 370,786 votes. Carried | | | | | | |

== Discussion ==
This was the fourth of eight referendum questions which have been passed as of October 2021.

After the amendment the Social Services Consolidation Act 1947 was passed. In addition the Pharmaceutical Benefits scheme, held unconstitutional in the Pharmaceutical Benefits case, was reintroduced and passed as the Pharmaceutical Benefits Act 1947.

== Subsequent consideration ==
The meaning of the exception of "civil conscription" was considered by the High Court in General Practitioners Society v Commonwealth where Justice Gibbs took a narrow view of the exception, holding that civil conscription, in the context of medical and dental services, "refers to any sort of compulsion to engage in practice as a doctor or a dentist or to perform particular medical or dental services" and distinguished that from the permissible "regulation of the manner in which a service is performed" if the benefit is to be obtained".

The High Court conducted an extensive review of what amounts to civil conscription in Wong v Commonwealth, holding that the Medicare system did not amount to civil conscription of doctors "because doctors do not compulsorily provide service for the Commonwealth, or for other bodies on the Commonwealth’s behalf. The Act does not force doctors to treat or not treat particular patients. Doctors are free to choose where and when they practise".

== See also ==
- Politics of Australia
- History of Australia

Amendments to the Constitution of Australia
| 3rd amendment 2nd state debts amendment (1928) | Social services amendment 1928 | 5th amendment Aboriginals (1967) |
