= Pharmaceutical Benefits Scheme =

Australian Government subsidy for prescription medication

Scheme overview
- Formed: 1 July 1948; 78 years ago
- Jurisdiction: Australian Government
- Minister responsible: Mark Butler, Minister for Health and Ageing
- Parent department: Department of Health, Disability and Ageing
- Website: www.pbs.gov.au

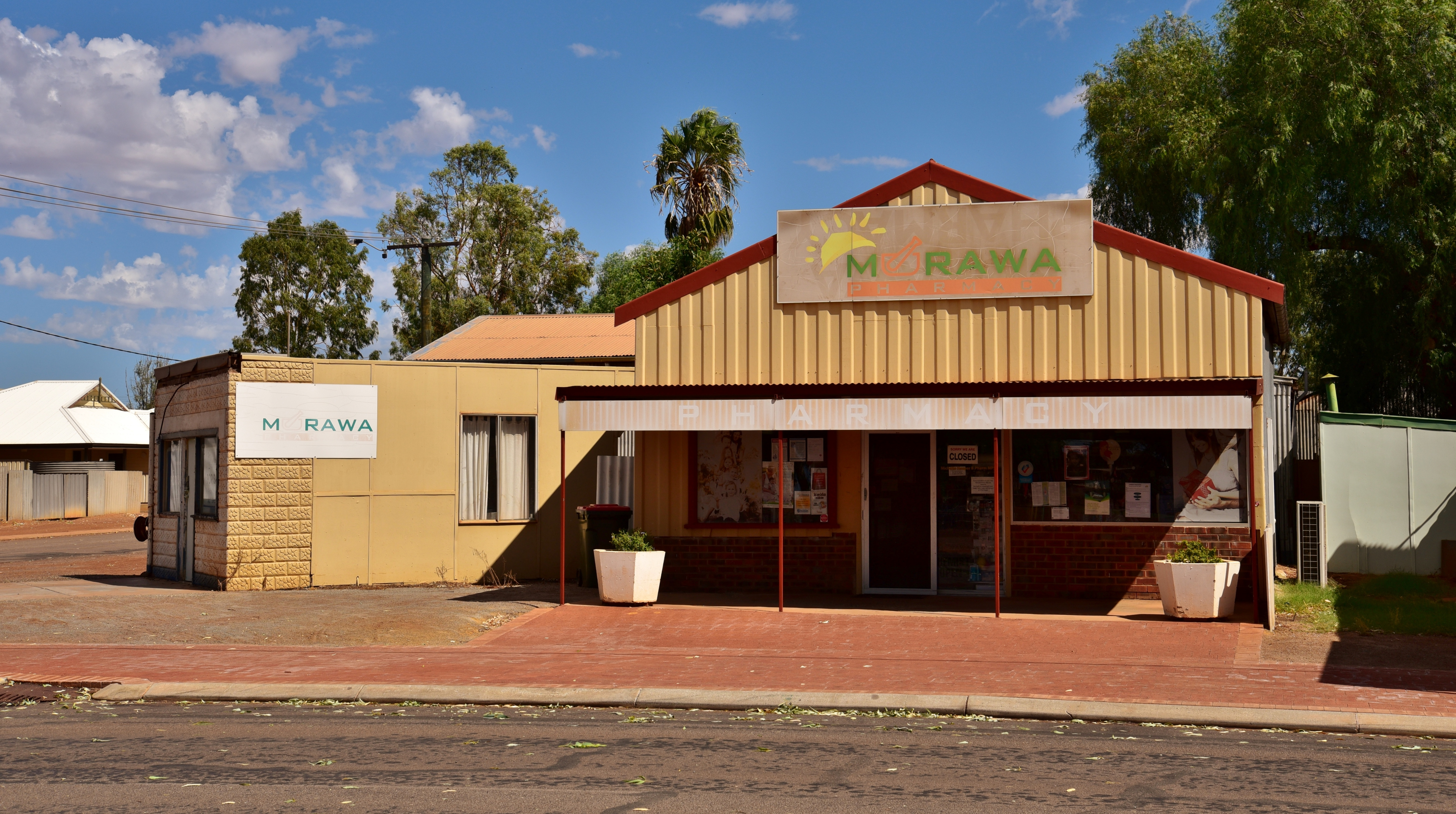
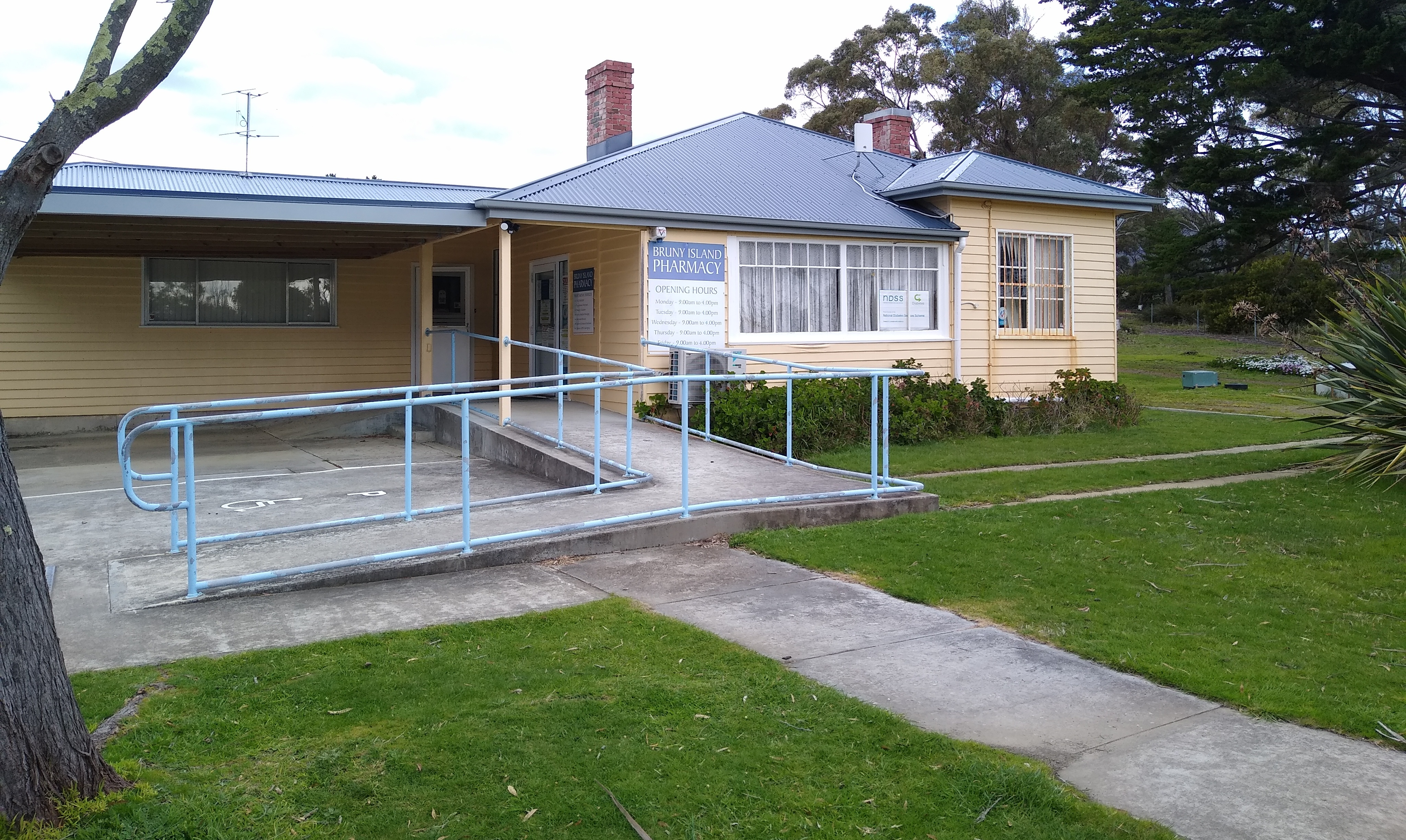
The PBS permits access to subsidised medicines at pharmacies across Australia, from (for example) Morawa, Western Australia (left) to Bruny Island, Tasmania (right)

The Pharmaceutical Benefits Scheme (PBS) is a program of the Australian Government that subsidises prescription medication for Australian citizens and permanent residents, as well as international visitors covered by a reciprocal health care agreement. Established under the National Health Act 1953, the PBS is separate to the Medicare Benefits Schedule, a list of health care services that can be claimed under Medicare, Australia's universal health care insurance scheme.

The PBS began in 1948, following a national referendum in 1946 that granted the federal government legal authority over provision of pharmaceutical services (among other health and social services). Starting from a list of 139 "life-saving and disease preventing" medicines in 1948, the PBS subsidises more than 900 prescription medicines as of 2026.

The out-of-pocket amount for some medications has increased since 1960, with increased subsidies for concession holders beginning in 1983. Safety nets were introduced in 2000 and expanded in 2004, limiting the total out-of-pocket expense singles or families would pay per year for health care in Australia.

== History ==
=== Inception ===
On 16 February 1944, the federal health minister, Senator James Fraser, introduced the Pharmaceutical Benefits Bill 1944 to the Senate. The legislation was part of a wider plan of the Curtin Labor government to create a British-style National Health Service. It was an extension of the Repatriation Pharmaceutical Benefits Scheme, established in 1919 for Australian servicemen and women who had served in the Boer War and World War I. The new scheme provided that medicines listed in the Commonwealth Pharmaceutical Formulary would be free, provided they were obtained via a prescription, written by a registered medical practitioner on an official government form, presented to a Commonwealth approved pharmacist. A Formulary Committee was established to advise the minister about what medications should be included in the formulary. That committee was a precursor to the Pharmaceutical Benefits Advisory Committee.

The Australian Branch of the British Medical Association (BMA) challenged the Act and, in Attorney-General (Vic) ex rel Dale v Commonwealth, the High Court of Australia declared the Act unconstitutional on the basis that the Commonwealth did not have the power to spend money on the provision of medicines. That decision prompted the government to initiate a 1946 referendum, which approved an amendment to the Australian Constitution to allow the Commonwealth government to provide pharmaceutical benefits. The Pharmaceutical Benefits Act 1947 was subsequently passed by parliamant.

Ongoing resistance by the medical profession forced amendments to provisions that required practitioners to use Commonwealth prescription forms or face a fine. Again, the BMA challenged the Act and again the High Court found it unconstitutional. In November 1947, under Section 15 of the 1947 Act, the Commonwealth made arrangements to supply free products for immunisation against diphtheria and whooping cough. Despite the High Court finding, the Commonwealth attempted to implement the scheme with voluntary participation, but only a few doctors participated. The PBS commenced on 1 July 1948.

Finally, in October 1949, in British Medical Association v Commonwealth (1949), the High Court ruled that the PBS was constitutional.

With the election of the Menzies Coalition government in December 1949, the comprehensive scheme proposed under the 1947 Act was altered to limit the PBS list to 139 "life saving and disease preventing Drugs". The new regulations came into force on 4 September 1950. Changes to PBS were introduced on 1 March 1960 by the National Health Act No. 72 1959, which combined the existing pensioner and general schemes, expanded the range of drugs available to the general public and, to provide some control on volumes and expenditure, introduced a patient contribution (or co-payment) of 5 shillings. Despite the introduction of the co-payment, prescription volumes increased from 24.6 million in 1959/60, to 60.4 million in 1968/69, and Commonwealth expenditure rose from $43 million to $100 million at the end of the decade.

=== 2000s ===
Former federal Treasurer Peter Costello and the Liberal Party attempted to raise the patient co-payment of PBS medicines by up to 30 per cent in the 2002 Federal Budget, however this measure was blocked in the Senate in which various minor parties held the balance of power. However, in June 2004 the main opposition party, the Australian Labor Party, announced that it would allow the PBS co-payment increases to proceed through the Senate.

By 2003 the number of drugs included under the scheme had expanded to 601 general products which were marketed as 2,602 different brands. The scheme was appealing to policy makers because it required no major capital works program and could be implemented immediately without lengthy consultation with the medical profession.

In 2007, a “price disclosure” regime was added to obtain more value out of the existing scheme. This meant prices and volumes for generic versions of medicines sold to pharmacies had to be disclosed to the Department of Health. With this information, the payments to pharmacies can then be assessed to reduce excessive markups. This new data would be received in cycles of 23 to 27 months meaning price reductions would only flow through in those intervals. This regime was later expanded in 2010 to cover all subsidised medicines and reduce the data cycles to 18 months. In response to these changes, the Pharmacy Guild of Australia claimed the survival of local pharmacies would be threatened from lower margins.

=== 2010s ===
A large reduction on prices of medicines occurred from 1 April 2012 under the Gillard Labor government. This reduced the price of some medicines to below the PBS general copayment amount resulting in cost savings for Australians.

According to the Department of Health Annual Report, the cost of the PBS in 2014–15 was $9.1 billion. According to a report by the Australian Productivity Commission the PBS is expected to cost 2.6% of Australia's GDP by 2045 up from 0.7% in 2005. Further attempts to restrain the growth in costs of the PBS may be needed, however, attempts to increase consumer prices of drugs have always proved politically unpopular. The comparative cost-effectiveness processes of the PBS nonetheless ensure it provides Australian citizens with more equitable access to medicines than in many other developed nations and for many the issue of sustainability of the PBS as a key component of the egalitarian architecture of Australian society is equivalent to asking whether that nation's education system or defence forces are sustainable.

In 2016, 17 types of medication were removed from the PBS, including Panadol Osteo, aspirin, iron/folic supplements, electrolytes, and laxatives. Other medications include medication for reflux, skin allergies, antacids, urine test strips, and Vitamin B12 injections. The change was expected to save the government approximately $87 million a year.

=== 2020s–current ===
In May 2022, the Albanese government was elected and rapidly implemented changes to the PBS as a cost of living measure. On 1 July, the safety net thresholds were reduced.

In October 2022, a legislative amendment was passed to reduce the general copayment to $30 from 1 January 2023; there was no reduction to the concession copayment. Despite the changes being announced to assist Australians with the cost of living amid rising interest rates and the general copayment rate reduced to be 20% lower than when Labor last held office in 2013, the concession rate remained 19% higher than it had been in 2013.

In January 2023, the general copayment reduction was the first decrease since the inception of the PBS. In 2025, the copayment amount was not indexed with inflation for the first time in more 25 years.

== Operations ==
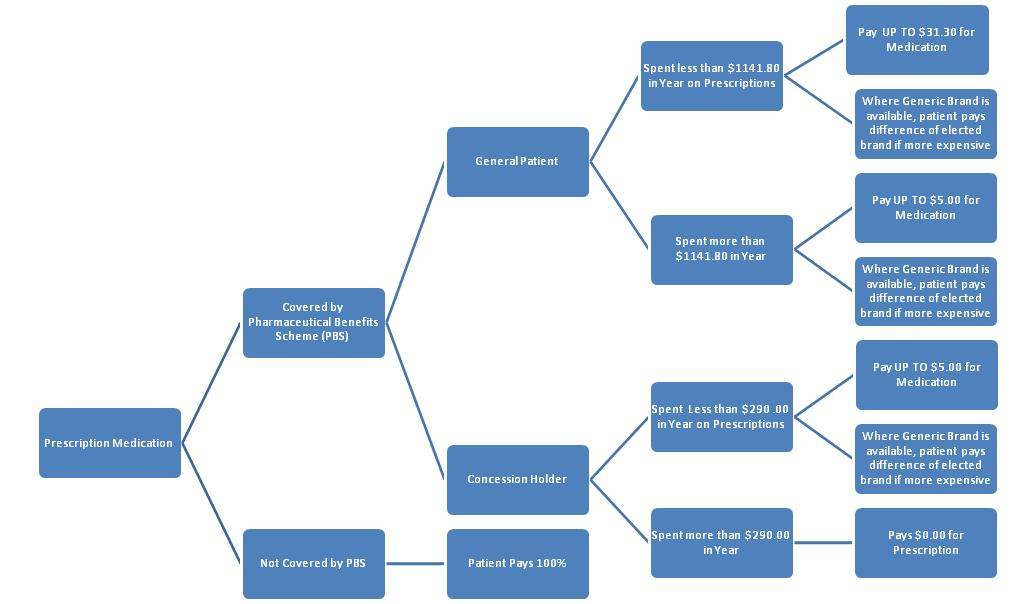
Diagram showing the provision of medication under the PBS, as at 2008

PBS is governed by the National Health Act 1953 and National Health (Pharmaceutical Benefits) Regulations 1960 (Cth). Pharmaceutical benefits under PBS may only be supplied by pharmacists and medical practitioners approved under the Act.

Applications to list a drug on the Pharmaceutical Benefits Schedule are administered by the Department of Health. Pharmaceutical benefits under the PBS are administered by Medicare Australia (formerly the Health Insurance Commission) under the Health Insurance Act 1973 (Cth).

A benefit under PBS is only given on medications which are listed in the Pharmaceutical Benefits Schedule. The medication may be listed for general use as an unrestricted benefit, or for a specific indication as a restricted benefit. When a PBS medication is dispensed by a pharmacist, the patient pays the patient contribution (subject to concessions and safety nets) and Medicare Australia pays the remainder of the agreed cost of the medication to the pharmacist.

The cost of a medication is negotiated between the government, through the Department of Health, and the supplier of the drug. The agreed price becomes the basis of the dispensed price of the medication which is negotiated between the government and the Pharmacy Guild of Australia under the current Community Pharmacy Agreement. The dispensed price includes the wholesaler's markup, pharmacist's markup, and a dispensing fee. Pharmacies purchase PBS-listed drugs from the wholesaler or supplier, and claim the difference between the dispensed price and the patient co-payment contribution from Medicare Australia.

Medical practitioners, dentists, optometrists, midwives and nurse practitioners who are registered with the Australian Health Practitioner Regulation Agency (AHPRA) can write PBS-subsidised prescriptions. Pharmacists can prescribe scheduled medicines, but these are not subsidised by the PBS. Podiatrists can prescribe from an authorised list of medicines, but these are also not available on the PBS.

=== Patient contribution and safety net ===
When purchasing a medication under PBS the maximum price a patient pays is the patient contribution (also called a co-payment or out-of-pocket cost), which in 2019 was A$40.30 for general patients. For PBS medications costing less than $40.30, the patient pays the PBS dispensed price plus an additional $1.17 safety net recording fee plus an optional pharmacy charge of $4.33 or less, provided that the total charge does not exceed $40.30. This copayment amount is generally indexed with the Consumer Price Index at the start of each year.

Concessional patients – i.e., low-income earners, welfare recipients, Health Care Card holders, etc. and those covered under the Repatriation Pharmaceutical Benefits Scheme (RPBS) – pay a patient contribution of $6.50 in 2019. Patient contributions are compulsory and cannot be discounted by pharmacies.

Safety net provisions in PBS reduce patient contributions when singles and families exceed in a calendar year the PBS safety net threshold: when a general patient reaches the general PBS threshold, their co-payment reduces to the concession price for the remainder of that calendar year; while concession patients who reach the concession PBS threshold do not pay anything on PBS medications for the remainder of the year. The PBS safety net is separate from and in addition to the Medicare safety nets.

Changes in patient contributions and the safety net over the years are as follows:

Year	Co-payment (general)	Co-payment (concession)	Safety net (general)	Safety net (concession)
1948	$Nil	N/A		
1960	$0.50	N/A		
1971	$1.00	N/A		
1975	$1.50	N/A		
1976	$2.00	N/A		
1978	$2.50	N/A		
1979	$2.75	N/A		
1981	$3.20	N/A		
1983	$4.00	$2.00		
1985	$5.00	$2.00		
1986	$10.00	$2.50	25 scripts	25 scripts
1988	$11.00	$2.50		
1990	$15.00	$2.50		
1997	$20.00	$3.20		
2000	$20.60	$3.50	$631.20	$171.60
2001	$21.90	$3.50	$669.70	$182.00
2002	$22.40	$3.60	$686.40	$187.20
2003	$23.10	$3.70	$708.40	$192.40
2004	$23.70	$3.80	$726.80	$197.60
2005	$28.60	$4.60	$874.90	$239.20
2006	$29.50	$4.70	$960.10	$253.80
2007	$30.70	$4.90	$1059.00	$274.40
2008	$31.30	$5.00	$1141.80	$290.00
2009	$32.90	$5.30	$1264.90	$318.00
2010	$33.30	$5.40	$1281.30	$324.00
2011	$34.20	$5.60	$1317.20	$336.00
2012	$35.40	$5.80	$1363.30	$348.00
2013	$36.10	$5.90	$1390.60	$354.00
2014	$36.90	$6.00	$1421.20	$360.00
2015	$37.70	$6.10	$1453.90	$366.00
2016	$38.30	$6.20	$1475.70	$372.00
2017	$38.80	$6.30	$1494.90	$378.00
2018	$39.50	$6.40	$1521.80	$384.00
2019	$40.30	$6.50	$1550.70	$390.00
2020	$41.00	$6.60	$1486.80	$316.80
2021	$41.30	$6.60	$1497.20	$316.80
01/2022	$42.50	$6.80	$1542.10	$326.40
07/2022	$42.50	$6.80	$1457.10	$244.80
2023	$30.00	$7.30	$1563.50	$262.80
2024	$31.60	$7.70	$1647.90	$277.20
2025	$31.60	$7.70	$1694.00	$277.20
2026	$25.00	$7.70	$1748.20	$277.20

=== Foreign visitors ===
PBS subsidised medications are also available to foreign visitors whose countries have entered into a Reciprocal Health Care Agreement with Australia. These countries include the United Kingdom, Ireland, New Zealand, Malta, Italy, Sweden, the Netherlands, Finland, Norway, Belgium and Slovenia. Eligible foreign visitors must produce a passport to obtain subsidised medications.

== Schedule of Pharmaceutical Benefits ==
The Pharmaceutical Benefits Advisory Committee (PBAC) makes recommendations to the Minister for Health and Ageing regarding drugs which should be made available as pharmaceutical benefits, which are listed on the Schedule of Pharmaceutical Benefits. The Schedule is published monthly since January 2007.

In considering a medication for listing on the PBS, the PBAC considers factors including:

- The conditions for which the drug has been approved for use in Australia by the Therapeutic Goods Administration. The PBAC only recommends the listing of a medicine for use in a condition which is in accordance with the Australian Register of Therapeutic Goods.
- The conditions in which use has been demonstrated to be effective and safe compared to other therapies.
- The costs involved. The PBAC is required to ensure that the money that the community spends in subsidising the PBS represents cost-effective expenditure of taxpayers' funds.
- A range of other factors and health benefits. These factors may include, for example, costs of hospitalisation or other alternative medical treatments that may be required, as well as less tangible factors such as patients' quality of life.

Decisions on PBS listing are generally made on a health economics perspective, using cost-effectiveness analysis. Cost-effectiveness analysis evaluates the cost and health effects of one technology versus the cost and health effects of another technology, which is usually standard of care. A new technology whose incremental health benefit justifies its additional expense is deemed to be cost-effective and thus reimbursed by PBAC. Drugs that provide little health benefit at considerable additional expense, such as the PDE5 inhibitors (e.g. sildenafil) and certain expensive cancer chemotherapy drugs are not listed on the basis of poor cost-effectiveness. Nonetheless, cost-effectiveness may not be the decisive factor. For example, for a drug that is the only available treatment for a severe illness, listing may be recommended on the basis of the "rule of rescue". The principles that are applied during the evaluation of drugs for PBS listing are described in the PBAC Guidelines.

=== Unrestricted benefits ===
Drugs that have unrestricted benefit listing on the PBS are available for general use without being limited to particular indications. Such items are typically those whose use in clinical practice is widely accepted. Examples include methotrexate, prednisone and amoxycillin.

=== Restricted benefits ===
Certain medications listed on the PBS are available only for specific therapeutic indications or to patients meeting specific criteria where the PBAC has deemed that the cost-benefit analysis is favourable only in those indications/patients. These are noted as "restricted benefits" on the Schedule. Medicare Australia places the onus of policing restricted benefits on the prescribers themselves and the pharmacists dispensing (unless the listing is also 'Authority Required'). For example, the COX-2 inhibitor celecoxib is listed on the PBS as a restricted benefit for the symptomatic treatment of osteoarthritis and rheumatoid arthritis. Prescribers using celecoxib for other indications are expected to indicate "non-PBS" on the prescription, and/or the pharmacist dispensing the celecoxib should charge the patient the full cost.

=== Authority required benefits ===
Some PBS medications are restricted and require prior approval from Medicare Australia. These are noted as "authority required benefits" on the Schedule. Again, the PBAC has deemed that the cost-benefit analysis is favourable only under in specific indications/patients under certain circumstances. Authority may be obtained by telephone to Medicare Australia (known as "phone approval") or in writing from an authorised delegate of the Minister for Health and Ageing. Prescriptions must be written on an Authority Prescription Form, and the approval number must be noted on the prescription. Pharmacists cannot dispense the item as a pharmaceutical benefit unless it has been approved by Medicare Australia (indicated by the presence of the approval number).

In obtaining a phone approval, the doctor simply identifies themselves (using their name and provider number), the patient (using their Medicare number), and when asked by the operator, confirms which of the conditions eligible for an authority the patient is suffering from. Medicare normally accepts the doctor's assertion that the condition exists as sufficient. For a written Authority however, evidence of diagnosis and patient eligibility criteria such a pathology test results are usually required.

Some drugs may have Authority Required (Streamlined) status which does not require an explicit approval from Medicare, instead the doctor can use the Authority code found in the published Schedule for a given drug/indication.

== Integrity and cost containment measures ==
=== Therapeutic group premium ===
On 1 February 1998, another effort to limit the cost of the PBS involved the introduction of Therapeutic Group Premiums (TGPs) on medications that are priced significantly above the cheapest medication in a defined therapeutic sub-group where the drugs are considered to be of similar safety and efficacy. The TGP is the price difference between the premium brand and the benchmark (base) price for drugs in the class. The patient must pay this TGP in addition to the normal patient co-payment contribution if they have been prescribed such a medication. The TGP paid does not count toward the Safety Net threshold.

However, a prescriber may obtain an exemption from the TGP if:

- adverse effects occurring with all of the base-priced drugs; or
- drug interactions occurring with all of the base-priced drugs; or
- drug interactions expected to occur with all of the base-priced drugs; or
- transfer to a base-priced drug would cause patient confusion resulting in problems with compliance.

Such an exemption requires an approved PBS Authority prescription from Medicare Australia.

=== Brand premium and generic medicines ===
In an effort to limit the cost of PBS, in July 2007 the Australian Government introduced brand premiums on medications where cheaper generic brands were available. The Brand Premium is usually the price difference between the innovator brand and the generic brand. The patient pays the Brand Premium in addition to the normal patient contribution if they decline to purchase the generic brand. The Brand Premium paid does not count toward either safety net threshold and must still be paid even after the threshold is reached.

Pharmacists are allowed to substitute generic brands for prescribed brands if the brands are flagged "a" in the Schedule of Pharmaceutical Benefits, and if consent is obtained from the patient and prescriber. The prescriber's consent is always assumed to be granted unless "brand substitution not permitted" is indicated on the prescription.

The National Health Act 1953 (Cth) divided the PBS formulary into an F1 category (for patented, single brand medicines) and an F2 category (for generic medicines) with reduced reference pricing between them. Academic opinion is divided about the value of these changes and the extent to which they arose from industry lobbying drawing strength from Annex 2C of the AUSFTA.

=== Safety net 20-day rule ===
In an effort to limit the cost of PBS by discouraging patients from filling PBS prescriptions earlier than needed, in 2009 the safety net 20-day rule was brought in. Under the rule, a repeat prescription supplied within 20 days of a previous supply of the same medicine will not count towards the PBS safety net threshold. If the patient has already reached the safety net threshold, they will be charged the normal patient contribution instead of the reduced safety net amount.

=== Prescription Shopping Programme ===
The Prescription Shopping Programme (PSP) has been set up to identify patients who may be getting more PBS subsidised medicines than they need, which is also related to “doctor shopping”. The programme identifies patients who, in any 3-month period, receive:

- any PBS items prescribed by 6 or more different prescribers
- a total of 25 or more PBS target items
- a total of 50 or more items. This includes PBS items both target and non-target, supplied to the patient.

== Research ==
=== Research uses ===
An anonymised 10% sample of people eligible for medicines subsidised by the Pharmaceutical Benefits Scheme (PBS) is made available for research purposes. Licences are held between Services Australia, who hold the data for the PBS, and academics at Monash University, University of New South Wales, University of South Australia and the University of Western Australia to use the data for research purposes. Research outputs from this data have to be approved by Services Australia prior to publication. This data can create a picture of dispensed medicines in Australia and allows trends in medicines usage to be explored.

=== The Grattan Institute Report March 2013 ===
Grattan Institute Health Program released a report titled "Australia’s bad drug deal" by Dr Stephen Duckett, in which he states that Australia's Pharmaceutical Benefits Scheme pays at least $1.3 billion a year too much for prescription drugs. New Zealand, which has capped its budget and appointed independent experts to make decisions through the Pharmaceutical Management Agency (Pharmac), pays a sixth as much as the PBS for the same drugs. Public hospitals in two Australian states pay much lower prices than the PBS. In one case, the prices are just a sixth of PBS prices. In one extreme example the report states that "The price of one drug, Olanzapine, is 64 times higher on the PBS than in Western Australian public hospitals". This report proposes three ways Australia can regain its lost leadership in pharmaceutical pricing.

== See also ==
- Health care in Australia
- Social security in Australia
- Therapeutic Goods Administration
