= Attorney-General (Vic) ex rel Dale v Commonwealth =

Judgement of the High Court of Australia

Attorney-General (Vic); ex rel Dale v Commonwealth
- Court: High Court of Australia
- Full case name: Attorney-General for Victoria (at the Relation of John Dale, Peter McCallum and Roy Fallowes Watson) v Commonwealth
- Decided: 19 November 1945
- Citations: [1945] HCA 30, (1945) 71 CLR 237

Case history
- Subsequent actions: British Medical Association v Commonwealth [1949] HCA 44, (1949) 79 CLR 201

Court membership
- Judges sitting: Latham CJ, Rich, Starke, Dixon, McTiernan & Williams JJ.

Case opinions
- 4:1 the "Pharmaceutical Benefits Act 1944" was invalid McTiernan J dissenting

Attorney-General (Vic); Ex rel Dale v Commonwealth, commonly known as the "First Pharmaceutical Benefits case", was a High Court of Australia decision. The case dealt with limits of the powers of the Australian Federal Government under section 81 of the Constitution of Australia, to take and spend money by legislation, in this case to fund reduced prices for prescription medicines.

== Background ==
In 1944, the Labor Federal Government of Prime Minister Ben Chifley bill for the "Pharmaceutical Benefits Act 1944" received Royal Assent. The law was immediately challenged by the Attorney-General for Victoria on behalf of three Victorian medical doctors, Dale, McCallum and Watson, who were the president, vice-president and secretary of the Victorian Medical Association. Doctors opposed the scheme because they saw it as the start of a plan to nationalise healthcare.

== Decision ==
=== Standing ===
The first matter to be decided was whether a State Attorney General had "standing" to intercede in a Commonwealth Government matter. All of the judges held that the Attorney-General has standing to argue that an Act of the Commonwealth Parliament was invalid under the constitution, following a line of authority commencing with the Union Label case. Justice Dixon reformulated the test, holding that:

It is the traditional duty of the Attorney-General to protect public rights and to complain of excesses of a power bestowed by law and in our Federal system the result has been to give the Attorney-General of a State a locus standi to sue for a declaration wherever his public is or may be affected by what he says is an ultra vires act on the part of the Commonwealth or of another State.

=== Appropriations power ===
On the substantial matter of the constitutionality of "Pharmaceutical Benefits Act 1944", the issue was whether the appropriations power, was a free standing power to spend any money raised by the Australian government, or whether the power was limited to matters on which the Australian parliament could pass legislation, particularly section 81 of the constitution. The majority of the court took a restrictive view of the appropriations power, holding that the Act was beyond the scope of the powers granted to the Federal Government in section 81 of the Constitution. The court was however divided as to the nature of that restriction, with each judge giving the own judgment and there was no clear reason for the decision. Latham CJ took a broad view of the appropriations power, however he characterised the law as one controlling doctors, chemists and the sale of drugs and only incidentally for the appropriation of money. Justices Starke and Williams held that expenditure had to be supported by another head of legislative power. Justice Dixon rejected both the narrow and wide view of the appropriations power, holding that each question had to be determined according to "the distribution of powers and functions between the Commonwealth and the States", but deciding, similarly to Latham CJ, that the "Pharmaceutical Benefits Act 1944" was primarily for dispensing free medicine and appropriation of money was only incidental. Rich J agreed with Dixon J. Justice McTiernan dissented, taking a wide view of the appropriations power, holding that "The Constitution puts the power of the purse in the hands of Parliament, not in the hands of the Courts."

== Aftermath ==
=== 1946 Referendum ===
The decision prompted the 1946 referendum to amend the Constitution to give the Australian Parliament the power to make laws with respect to:

s51(xxiiiA.) The provision of maternity allowances, widows' pensions, child endowment, unemployment, pharmaceutical, sickness and hospital benefits, medical and dental services (but not so as to authorise any form of civil conscription), benefits to students and family allowances:

The referendum was passed, being approved by 54.39% of voters and obtained a majority in all six States.

=== Second Pharmaceutical Benefits case ===
After the success of the referendum, the Australian Parliament passed the Pharmaceutical Benefits Act 1947, relying on the new head of power. The majority of the high Court held that the Act was invalid as authorising a form of civil conscription. The construction of section 81 of the constitution was settled on the narrow view, that expenditure had to be supported by another head of legislative power.

== See also ==
- Pharmaceutical Benefits Scheme
