= Walter Price (Australian cricketer) =

Australian cricketer

Cricket information
- Bowling: Right-arm medium

Career statistics
Competition	First-class
Matches	1
Runs scored	12
Batting average	12.00
100s/50s	0/0
Top score	7
Balls bowled	180
Wickets	2
Bowling average	36.00
5 wickets in innings	0
10 wickets in match	0
Best bowling	2/36
Catches/stumpings	1/–
- Source: CricketArchive, 5 November 2022

Walter Price (24 March 1886 – 29 July 1944) was an Australian cricketer, who played a single first-class match: for South Australia against Victoria in the 1913-14 Sheffield Shield. He scored 7 and 5 not out, and took the wickets of Eugene Carroll and Carl Willis.

Price was born in Hawthorn, South Australia; he died in Adelaide at the age of 58.
