= 1946 Australian referendum =

A referendum was held in Australia on 28 September 1946. It contained three referendum questions.

Results (Note: Handbook of the 44th Parliament (2014) "Part 5 - Referendums and Plebiscites - Referendum results". Parliamentary Library of Australia.)
Question	NSW	Vic	Qld	SA	WA	Tas	States in favour	Voters in favour	Result
(20) Social Services	Yes	Yes	Yes	Yes	Yes	Yes	6:0	54.4%	Carried
(21) Marketing	Yes	Yes	No	No	Yes	No	3:3	50.6%	Not carried
(22) Industrial Employment	Yes	Yes	No	No	Yes	No	3:3	50.3%	Not carried

The referendum was held in conjunction with the 1946 federal election.

== Results in detail ==
=== Social Services ===
Result
State	Electoral roll	Ballots issued	For		Against		Informal
State	Electoral roll	Ballots issued	Vote	%	Vote	%	Informal
New South Wales	1,858,749	1,757,150	897,887	54.00	764,723	46.00	94,540
Victoria	1,345,537	1,261,374	671,967	55.98	528,452	44.02	60,955
Queensland	660,316	612,170	299,205	51.26	284,465	48.74	28,500
South Australia	420,361	399,301	197,395	51.73	184,172	48.27	17,734
Western Australia	300,337	279,066	164,017	62.26	99,412	37.74	15,637
Tasmania	154,553	144,880	67,463	50.58	65,924	49.42	11,493
Armed forces (Note: Armed forces totals are also included in their respective states.)		37,021	22,824		13,211		986
Total for Commonwealth	4,739,853	4,453,941	2,297,934	54.39	1,927,148	45.61	228,859
Results	Obtained majority in six states and an overall majority of 370,786 votes. Carried						

This section is an excerpt from 1946 Australian referendum (Social Services) § Results

=== Marketing ===
Result
State	Electoral roll	Ballots issued	For		Against		Informal
State	Electoral roll	Ballots issued	Vote	%	Vote	%	Informal
New South Wales	1,858,749	1,757,150	855,233	51.83	794,852	48.17	107,065
Victoria	1,345,537	1,261,374	624,343	52.37	567,860	47.63	69,171
Queensland	660,316	612,170	251,672	43.74	323,678	56.26	36,820
South Australia	420,361	399,301	183,674	48.74	193,201	51.26	22,426
Western Australia	300,337	279,066	145,781	56.21	113,562	43.79	19,723
Tasmania	154,553	144,880	55,561	42.55	75,018	57.45	14,301
Armed forces (Note: Armed forces totals are also included in their respective states.)		37,021	19,924	53.81	15,997	43.21	986
Total for Commonwealth	4,739,853	4,453,941	2,116,264	50.57	2,068,171	49.43	269,506
Results	Obtained majority in three states and an overall majority of 48,093 votes. Not carried						

This section is an excerpt from 1946 Australian referendum (Marketing) § Results

=== Industrial Employment ===
Result
State	Electoral roll	Ballots issued	For		Against		Informal
State	Electoral roll	Ballots issued	Vote	%	Vote	%	Informal
New South Wales	1,858,749	1,757,150	833,822	51.72	778,280	48.28	145,048
Victoria	1,345,537	1,261,374	609,355	52.08	560,773	47.92	91,246
Queensland	660,316	612,170	243,242	43.42	316,970	56.58	51,958
South Australia	420,361	399,301	179,153	48.20	192,516	51.80	27,632
Western Australia	300,337	279,066	142,186	55.74	112,881	44.26	23,999
Tasmania	154,553	144,880	52,517	41.37	74,440	58.63	17,923
Armed forces (Note: Armed forces totals are also included in their respective states.)		37,021	20,445	55.23	15,239	41.16	1337
Total for Commonwealth	4,739,853	4,453,941	2,060,275	50.30	2,035,860	49.70	357,806
Results	Obtained majority in three states and an overall majority of 24,415 votes. Not carried						

This section is an excerpt from 1946 Australian referendum (Industrial Employment) § Results

== See also ==
- Referendums in Australia
- Politics of Australia
- History of Australia
