= 1946 Australian Marketing of Primary Products referendum =

- 28 September 1946
- Do you approve of the proposed law for the alteration of the Constitution entitled — "Constitution Alteration (Organised Marketing of Primary Products) 1946" ?
- Voting system: A simple majority of voters nationwide.; A majority in 4 out of the 6 states.
- Outcome: Proposal rejected due to gaining a majority in only 3 of the 6 states.
Majority in each state.
Yes: New South Wales; Victoria; Western Australia	No: Queensland; South Australia; Tasmania

The Constitution Alteration (Organised Marketing of Primary Products) Bill 1946, was an unsuccessful proposal to alter the Australian Constitution to give the Commonwealth explicit power to make laws for the organised marketing of primary products and to exempt it from the freedom of interstate trade requirement of section 92 of the constitution. It was put to voters for approval in a referendum held on 28 September 1946.

== Question ==
Do you approve of the proposed law for the alteration of the Constitution entitled "Constitution Alteration (Organised Marketing of Primary Products) 1946"?

== Proposed Changes to the Constitution ==
The proposal was to insert into section 51 the following:

51. The Parliament shall, subject to this Constitution, have Legislative power to make laws for the peace, order, and good government of the Commonwealth with respect to:

...
(i.A.) Organized marketing of primary products;
...
(2.) The power of the Parliament to make laws under paragraph (i.A.) of the last preceding sub-section may be exercised notwithstanding anything contained in section ninety-two of this Constitution.

== Results ==
Result (Note: Handbook of the 44th Parliament (2014) "Part 5 - Referendums and Plebiscites - Referendum results". Parliamentary Library of Australia.)
State	Electoral roll	Ballots issued	For		Against		Informal
State	Electoral roll	Ballots issued	Vote	%	Vote	%	Informal
New South Wales	1,858,749	1,757,150	855,233	51.83	794,852	48.17	107,065
Victoria	1,345,537	1,261,374	624,343	52.37	567,860	47.63	69,171
Queensland	660,316	612,170	251,672	43.74	323,678	56.26	36,820
South Australia	420,361	399,301	183,674	48.74	193,201	51.26	22,426
Western Australia	300,337	279,066	145,781	56.21	113,562	43.79	19,723
Tasmania	154,553	144,880	55,561	42.55	75,018	57.45	14,301
Armed forces (Note: Armed forces totals are also included in their respective states.)		37,021	19,924	53.81	15,997	43.21	986
Total for Commonwealth	4,739,853	4,453,941	2,116,264	50.57	2,068,171	49.43	269,506
Results	Obtained majority in three states and an overall majority of 48,093 votes. Not carried						

== Discussion ==
This was the third occasion in which the commonwealth sought power to enact legislative schemes for the marketing of agricultural produce, having been unsuccessful in 1937 and 1944.

For a referendum to approve an amendment of the constitution, it must ordinarily achieve a double majority: approved by a majority of states (i.e., four of the six states) as well as a majority of those voting nationwide. This was the second of five referendums (as of October 2021) to achieve an overall majority, but fail the requirement of a majority of states.

== See also ==
- Politics of Australia
- History of Australia
