= Mary Farnham Miller =

American botanist (1872–1920)

- Born: January 26, 1872; Washington, D.C.
- Died: June 2, 1920 (aged 48); Washington, D.C.
- Occupation: Botanist, botanical collector, curator, researcher, scientific collector
- Employer: United States National Museum (1917–)

Mary Farnham Miller (January 26, 1872 – June 2, 1920) was an American botanist who specialized in bryology, the study of moss and lichen. She was one of the earliest members of the Sullivant Moss Society, and worked at the Smithsonian National Museum of Natural History.

== Early life and education ==
Mary Farnham Miller was born on January 26, 1872 in Washington, D.C. She graduated from Mrs. Osborne's School for young ladies.

== Career ==
Mary Farnham Miller was elected secretary of the Sullivant Moss Society and served from 1904 to 1905. She also was in charge of the Lichen Department of the organization under the guidance of Carolyn Wilson Harris starting in March 1908. She worked on mosses and lichens for the National Museum of Natural History in the Herbarium.

She corresponded with James Franklin Collins, and has added items to the National Museum of Natural History.

== Death and legacy ==
Miller died on June 2, 1920, in Washington, D.C.
