= Gillian Bouras =

Australian writer (born 1945)

- Born: 1945 (age 80–81); Melbourne, Victoria, Australia
- Occupation: Writer
- Known for: Writing fiction, non-fiction and children's works
- Spouse: George Bouras
- Children: Three sons

Gillian Bouras (born 1945) is an expatriate Australian writer who has written several books, short stories and articles, many of these dealing with her experiences as an Australian woman in Greece.

== Life ==
Gillian Bouras was born in Melbourne in 1945. Both her parents and her grandfather were school teachers. Her childhood was spent moving in several towns in Australia Victoria, including Nhill and Beechworth, and Melbourne.

Gillian Bouras studied for her Bachelor of Arts at the University of Melbourne, and from 1967 to 1980 she worked as a secondary school teacher of English. In 1981 Mrs Bouras completed her Master of Education thesis at the same university on the life of her grandfather: School teacher in Victoria: The biography of Arthur John Hicks.

She married George Bouras, a Greek emigrant to Australia, in 1969. In 1980 Gillian went with her husband and her two sons to the Peloponnese area of Greece, initially for a six-month holiday, but the family stayed. She had her third son in Greece, and eventually became a Greek citizen.

In 1996, her younger sister Jacqui committed suicide, after decades of mental illness. Bouras' book, No Time for Dances, explores her sister's life in an attempt to understand her suicide. Gillian Bouras wrote: "I keep trying to close a mental door, or to put a very firm lid on these questions, for there are no answers, and writing them down is one way of attempting closure."

Gillian Bouras now lives in the Peloponnese, Greece, but she maintains her ties with Australia.

== Career ==
Bouras published her first book, the autobiographical A Foreign Wife, in 1986. It describes her life as a foreign wife in Greece, and the challenges she faced in living in Greek culture and society. Most of the works she has published since then, both autobiographical and fiction, explore the themes of exile, cultural identity, and family.

Gillian Bouras also published short stories and articles in newspapers and journals such as The Griffith Review, Meanjin and Island. She has presented papers at conferences and participated in literary events, in Australia and abroad.

Since approximately 2000, Gillian Bouras prepared discussion notes for the book group program managed by the Australian Council of Adult Education (CAE).

== Awards and nominations ==
- 1994: Aphrodite and the Others: Ethnic Affairs Commission Award in the New South Wales Premier's Literary Awards
- 2007: No Time for Dances: Shortlisted for the National Biography Award

== Works ==
=== Non-fiction ===
- A Foreign Wife (1986)
- A Fair Exchange (1991)
- Aphrodite and the Others (1994)
- Starting Again (1999)
- No Time for Dances: A Memoir of my Sister (2006)

=== Adult fiction ===
- A Stranger Here (1996)

=== Children's fiction ===
- Saving Christmas (2000)
- Aphrodite Alexandra (2007)
