= Section 81 of the Constitution of Australia =

Methods of collecting revenue

Section 81 of the Constitution of Australia creates a "consolidated revenue fund", money collected by the Commonwealth through taxation and other levies. The way this money may be collected is regulated by Section 51 of the Constitution. Notable legal decisions decided by the High Court of Australia about section 81 include "the Pharmaceutical Benefits case"

== Text ==
All revenues or moneys raised or received by the Executive Government of the Commonwealth shall form one Consolidated Revenue Fund, to be appropriated for the purposes of the Commonwealth in the manner and subject to the charges and liabilities imposed by this Constitution.

— Section 81, Australian Constitution
