= Robert Percy =

Australian rules footballer

Personal information
- Full name: Robert Lindsay Percy
- Born: 25 June 1947 (age 79)
- Height: 180 cm (5 ft 11 in)
- Weight: 80 kg (176 lb)

Playing career^{1}
| Years | Club | Games (Goals) |
| 1967–68 | Footscray | 6 (0) |
- ^{1} Playing statistics correct to the end of 1968.

Robert Lindsay Percy (born 25 June 1947) is a former Australian rules footballer who played with Footscray in the Victorian Football League (VFL) and Williamstown in the Victorian Football Association (VFA).

After six games with Footscray, Percy moved to Williamstown where he played 135 games, winning premierships 1969 and 1976 and the Williamstown Best and Fairest award in 1976. He was later elected to the Williamstown Football Club Hall of Fame.
