= Billy Moeller =

Australian boxer

Personal information
- Nationality: Australian
- Born: Billy Moeller; 24 June 1949 (age 77) Sydney, Australia
- Weight: 123 1/4 to 142 lb (55.9 to 64.4 kg)

Boxing career
- Weight class: feather, super feather, light, light welter, welterweight

Boxing record
- Total fights: 52
- Wins: 35 (KO 9)
- Losses: 12 (KO 1)
- Draws: 5

Billy Moeller (born 24 June 1949 in Sydney) is an Australian professional feather/super feather/light/light welter/welterweight boxer of the 1970s and '80s who won the Australian super featherweight title, and inaugural Commonwealth super featherweight title, and was a challenger for the New South Wales State (Australia) lightweight title against Jeff Malcolm, his professional fighting weight varied from 123 1/4 lb (55.9 kg; 8 st 11.3 lb), i.e. featherweight to 142 lb (64 kg; 10 st 2 lb), i.e. welterweight.
