= Mary Miller (soprano) =

Australian opera singer (soprano)

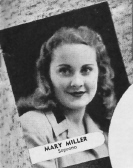
Mary Miller, from the cover of concert programme "Carols by Candlelight", 1947

Mary Miller (c.1926 - 8 January 1949) was an Australian singer. She showed early promise when, at age 14, she was ranked equal third in the South Street Contests held in Ballarat, Victoria, gaining 82 points. The winners (equal first) gained 84 points.

Mary Miller began her public career in about 1942 in Melbourne, Australia, as soprano. She subsequently appeared in many concerts, and was regularly featured on live broadcasts from Melbourne radio station 3KZ, and was broadcast nationally by the ABC from 1943. In February 1943, at age 16, she featured "on stage" at St Kilda Palais Pictures daily screenings of "Smilin' Through" that starred Jeanette MacDonald. In November 1945, she gave her first recital in Melbourne's Assembly Hall. In early 1946, she sang in Sydney Town Hall. She sang the role of Gilda in a concert performance of Rigoletto in 1947. She won the Sun Aria competition in 1948 with the highest score ever awarded, 95/100. She was immediately offered engagement at La Scala, Milan, Italy, but could not accept on account of her engagement to sing the role of Queen of the Night in The Magic Flute, the opening opera of National Opera's summer season. A month after winning the competition, and 5 days before her National Opera engagement, she collapsed with severe abdominal pain, and was taken to hospital where an emergency operation found advanced cancer, and died on 8 January 1949, at the age of 23.

A "brilliant" coloratura soprano, she was billed for her "superb coloratura and glorious tone". In an early concert, at the age of 15, she appeared in concert with renowned singer, Gladys Moncrieff, who years later described her as the "best Australian singer she had ever heard".

Most of her recordings have been lost; however, one CD "The Celebration of Mary Miller" survives, taken from old 78 records and tapes, at State Library of Victoria. A copy of one song, Strauss's "The Laughing Song", survives in the archives of the Australian Broadcasting Corporation (ABC), who occasionally airs it. The CD is available again in Melbourne.
