= Kevin McLeod (Australian footballer) =

Australian rules footballer

Personal information
- Full name: Kevin McLeod
- Born: 28 June 1949 (age 77)
- Height: 183 cm (6 ft 0 in)
- Weight: 76 kg (168 lb)

Playing career^{1}
Years	Club	Games (Goals)
1968	Footscray	1 (1)
- ^{1} Playing statistics correct to the end of 1968.

Kevin McLeod (born 28 June 1949) is a former Australian rules footballer who played with Footscray in the Victorian Football League (VFL).
