= Eric Muspratt =

Australian travel writer

Eric Muspratt (1899–1949) was an Australian travel writer.

He was born on 21 November 1899 in Essex, England and he travelled around the world four times. He wrote numerous books about his experiences, including My South Sea Island (1931) which was one of the first travel books to be published by the newly established Penguin Books.

He died in 1949 in Concord, New South Wales.

== Selected works ==
- My South Sea Island (1931)
- Wild Oats (1932)
- Greek Seas (1933)
- The Journey Home (1933)
- Ambition : an autobiographical novel (1934)
- Going Native (1936)
- Time is a Cheat (1946)
- Fire of Youth : the story of forty-five years wandering (1948)
