= 1946 Australian referendum (Industrial Employment) =

Australian Industrial Employment referendum, 1946
- 28 September 1946
- Do you approve of the proposed law for the alteration of the Constitution entitled — "Constitution Alteration (Industrial Employment) 1946" ?
- Voting system: A simple majority of voters nationwide.; A majority in 4 out of the 6 states.
- Outcome: Proposal rejected due to gaining a majority in only 3 of the 6 states.

The Constitution Alteration (Industrial Employment) Bill 1946, was an unsuccessful proposal to alter the Australian Constitution to give the Commonwealth power to make laws regulating employment in industry. It was put to voters for approval in a referendum held on 28 September 1946. The proposals was narrowly rejected, with a minority of 1.80% in the fourth state, South Australia. (Note: Handbook of the 44th Parliament (2014) "Part 5 - Referendums and Plebiscites - Referendum results". Parliamentary Library of Australia.)

== Question ==
Do you approve of the proposed law for the alteration of the Constitution entitled 'Constitution Alteration (Industrial Employment) 1946'?

== Proposed Changes to the Constitution ==
The proposal was to insert into section 51 that the Parliament have power to make laws with respect to:

:(xxxiv.A.) Terms and conditions of employment in industry, but not so as to authorize any form of industrial conscription;

== Results ==
Result
State	Electoral roll	Ballots issued	For		Against		Informal
State	Electoral roll	Ballots issued	Vote	%	Vote	%	Informal
New South Wales	1,858,749	1,757,150	833,822	51.72	778,280	48.28	145,048
Victoria	1,345,537	1,261,374	609,355	52.08	560,773	47.92	91,246
Queensland	660,316	612,170	243,242	43.42	316,970	56.58	51,958
South Australia	420,361	399,301	179,153	48.20	192,516	51.80	27,632
Western Australia	300,337	279,066	142,186	55.74	112,881	44.26	23,999
Tasmania	154,553	144,880	52,517	41.37	74,440	58.63	17,923
Armed forces (Note: Armed forces totals are also included in their respective states.)		37,021	20,445	55.23	15,239	41.16	1337
Total for Commonwealth	4,739,853	4,453,941	2,060,275	50.30	2,035,860	49.70	357,806
Results	Obtained majority in three states and an overall majority of 24,415 votes. Not carried						

== Discussion ==
This was the sixth occasion in which the commonwealth sought power to regulate terms and conditions of employment, rather than using the conciliation and arbitration power, having been unsuccessful in 1911, 1913, 1919, 1926 and 1944.

For a referendum to approve an amendment of the constitution, it must ordinarily achieve a double majority: approved by a majority of states (i.e., four of the six states) as well as a majority of those voting nationwide. This was the third of five referendums (as of October 2021) to achieve an overall majority, but fail the requirement of a majority of states.

== See also ==
- Politics of Australia
- History of Australia
