= Sands of time =

Sands of time may refer to:

- Sands of time (idiom), a figurative expression

== Film and television ==
- The Sands of Time (film), a 1919 British film produced by Harma Photoplays
- "The Sands of Time" (Xiaolin Showdown), a 2004 TV episode

== Literature ==
- The Sands of Time (Hoeye novel), a 2002 children's novel by Michael Hoeye
- The Sands of Time (Richards novel), a 1996 Doctor Who novel by Justin Richards
- The Sands of Time (Sheldon novel), a 1988 novel by Sidney Sheldon
- "The Sands of Time", a 1937 short story by P. Schuyler Miller

== Music ==
- The Sands of Time (band), 1970s Canadian rock band
- Sands of Time (opera), a 1993 opera by Peter Reynolds

=== Albums ===
- Sands of Time (Black Majesty album) or the title song, 2003
- Sands of Time (Jay and the Americans album), 1969
- Sands of Time (Nothing's Carved in Stone album) or the title song, 2010
- Sands of Time (S.O.S. Band album) or the title song, 1986
- Sands of Time, by Born from Pain, 2003
- Sands of Time, by Clive Palmer, 2004
- Sands of Time (EP), by Black Majesty, 2002

=== Songs ===
- "Sands of Time" (song), by Fleetwood Mac, 1971
- "Sands of Time", by Edguy from The Savage Poetry, 2000
- "Sands of Time", by Judas Priest from Nostradamus, 2008
- "Sands of Time", by Kaleef, 1998
- "Sands of Time", by Sylosis from Edge of the Earth, 2011
- "Sands of Time", by Vodka Collins, 1972
- "Sands of Time", by Wayne Hancock from A-Town Blues, 2001
- "Sands of Time", by Whitesnake Flesh & Blood, 2019
- "The Sands of Time", by LeAnn Rimes from God Bless America, 2001

== See also ==
- Prince of Persia: The Sands of Time, a 2003 video game
- Prince of Persia: The Sands of Time (film), a 2010 film based on the 2003 video game
