= Houseboat Horror =

- VHS cover
- Directed by: Kendal Flanagan; Ollie Martin
- Written by: Ollie Martin
- Produced by: Ollie Martin
- Starring: Alan Dale; John Michael Howson; Craig Alexander; Louise Siversen
- Edited by: Clayton Jacobson
- Music by: Brian Mannix
- Distributed by: AME Video
- Release date: 1989
- Running time: 81 mins
- Country: Australia
- Language: English

Houseboat Horror is a 1989 Australian slasher film directed by Kendal Flanagan and Ollie Martin, and starring Alan Dale, John Michael Howson, Craig Alexander, and Louise Siversen. The film was shot on video and released direct-to-video in 1989. It is often described by critics and audiences as one of the worst Australian films ever made.

== Plot ==
A film crew composed of media types and party animals from the city embarks on a road trip to record music videos of a hard-living rock band at rural Lake Infinity. Meanwhile, a hitchhiker is shocked by the grisly discovery of her friend's dead body. Alone and forced to run through dense scrubland to escape an unseen assailant, she fails to evade the killer and is stabbed to death. The visiting rock band with film crew, stop for fuel at a petrol station and are given an uneasy reception by locals who seem wary or suspicious of outsiders. They leave to meet the rest of the crew at a river where houseboats have been hired for transport and accommodation.

Further deaths occur, as his sneaking creep at the petrol station gives the impression he may be the killer. The band members go looking for mushrooms but find only toadstools, one leaves to rejoin the rest of the crew. The crew member who continues the search for mushrooms is stabbed by the killer, and the staff member returning to camp is alarmed by a bright flashlight shining into his eyes. Assuming it's his fellow crew member playing jokes, he admonishes him with the words "don't fuck around!"

A strange woman who told the crew about the fire is then seen talking to the mysterious assailant, explaining that if he continues, he will be taken away from her. The bodies of the couple shot by a harpoon and stabbed through the neck are then discovered, and the remaining crew lock the doors and windows. They try to contact the police, only to learn that another staff member accidentally dropped their portable phone into the water while partying.

The assailant, credited as "Acid Head" and played by Zlatko Kasumovic, then slices the director's fingers off and splits his head in half. Another crew member gets stabbed, although we later discover that his injuries are not fatal, and a blonde woman has her neck broken. Another female staff member tries to escape through the woods along the riverbank. During her escape, she discovers the bodies of the missing filmmakers who had left the crew's campfire after the first night of filming.

By morning, the woman was still running. The crew member stabbed non-fatally untied one of the houseboats, and together, they escape. The end credits roll and subtitles tell that "on October 17, Peace and Tranquility returned to Lake Infinity...FOR A TIME". Acid Head's arm and fist are then seen emerging sharply and victoriously from the waters of Lake Infinity, indicating that he has survived the attempts on his life and is still at large.

== Cast ==
- Alan Dale as Evans
- John Michael Howson as 'J'
- Craig Alexander
- Louise Siversen as Zelia
- Gavin Wood
- Des McKenna
- Christine Jeston
- Stephen Whittaker
- Peppie D'Or
- Wilkie Collins
- Zlatko Kasumovic

== Production ==
Ollie Martin worked as a reporter on the 1980s Channel Ten entertainment show Nightlife when he brought his idea for a horror movie to that show's producer Greg Petherick, who would become the movie's Greg Petherick. Martin wanted Brian Mannix in the cast, but he disliked the script and only accepted to contribute music. Deborra-Lee Furness helped cast the movie by bringing in participants from an acting workshop she attended, while Petherick brought in crew members from the television programmes he worked on. Production lasted for two weeks at Lake Eildon with Alan Dale living in his houseboat and the other 30 people that comprised the cast and crew living in six more. Martin only directed the movie for three days before the crew told Petherick they wanted to leave and the producer fired him, bringing in Kendal Flanagan to finish production. Elements were added by Petherick to get an R rating, including swearing, drug paraphernalia, and nudity, with a stripper from St. Kilda brought to the location to film a skinny-dipping scene. After filming wrapped, Martin took control again in post-production, recruiting Swinburne film school graduate Clayton Jacobson to edit the footage, which he could only do whenever Jacobson had free access to an editing suite, a period that took two years and had Martin film over 50 pick-up shots in-between, mostly to depict Acid Head's point of view. Only Dale, Mannix and effects supervisor Nick Dorning were paid for their work, with everyone else deferring their salaries for future profits, which wound up never coming once the movie was released directly to video.

== Reception ==
Houseboat Horror is often described by critics and audiences as one of the worst Australian films ever made, citing it as a "typical slasher film". It even carries the promotional tagline "See the film that can't get an Academy Award." The movie's ending is left open for a sequel which never eventuated.

Comedian Tony Martin, who highlighted the movie in his show The Late Show, stated that Houseboat Horror "might be the nearest thing in Australia to Ed Wood and Plan 9 From Outer Space."

Australian film critic Michael Adams included Houseboat Horror on his list of the worst-ever Australian films, along with Phantom Gold, The Glenrowan Affair, The Pirate Movie, Welcome to Woop Woop, Les Patterson Saves the World and Pandemonium.

=== Censorship ===
The film was banned in Queensland in March 1990 due to its gratuitous violence.

== Sources ==
- Adams, Michael (2010). Showgirls, Teen Wolves, and Astro Zombies: A Film Critic's Year-Long Quest to Find the Worst Movie Ever Made. New York City, New York: Itbooks. ISBN 978-0-06-180629-2.
- Murray, Scott (1996). Australia on the Small Screen 1970-1995. Oxford, England: Oxford University Press. ISBN 978-0-195-53949-3.
- Stratton, David (1990). The Avocado Plantation: Boom and Bust in the Australian Film Industry. Sydney, Australia: Pan MacMillan. ISBN 978-0-732-90250-6.
