= Tomorrowland (Black Majesty album) =

Studio album by Black Majesty
- Released: 2007
- Recorded: Palm Studios, Melbourne, Australia
- Genre: Power metal
- Length: 49:41
- Label: LMP
- Producer: Endel Rivers

Black Majesty chronology
Silent Company (2005)	Tomorrowland (2007)	In Your Honour (2010)

Tomorrowland is the third album by the Australian power metal band Black Majesty. A Limited Special Edition was also released which included two bonus tracks, a poster, a sticker, additional photos and personal liner notes by the band. Copies of this edition were limited to 4,000 copies worldwide.

== Track listing ==
1. "Forever Damned" - 5:10
2. "Into the Black" - 5:08
3. "Evil in Your Eyes" - 5:14
4. "Tomorrowland" - 4:48
5. "Soldier of Fortune" - 3:25 (Deep Purple cover)
6. "Bleeding World" - 5:15
7. "Faces of War" - 5:35
8. "Wings to Fly" - 5:01
9. "Another Dawn" - 5:08
10. "Scars" - 4:57

Special Edition bonus tracks:

- "Kingdoms" - 4:15
- "Memories" - 5:37

== Credits ==
=== Band members ===
- John "Gio" Cavaliere − lead vocals
- Stevie Janevski − guitars, backing vocals
- Hanny Mohamed − guitars, keyboards
- Pavel Konvalinka − drums
