= Joan of Arc (radio serial) =

1941 Australian radio serial about Joan of Arc by Anthony Scott Veitch

- Genre: drama serial
- Running time: 11:00 am–
- Country of origin: Australia
- Language: English
- Home station: 2GB
- Written by: Anthony Scott Veitch
- Produced by: George Matthews
- Recording studio: Sydney
- Original release: February 15 – April 24, 1941
- No. of series: 1

Joan of Arc is a 1941 Australian radio serial about Joan of Arc by Anthony Scott Veitch.

The serial was recorded in late 1939. It was not broadcast in Australia until 1941 but was launched with considerable publicity.

== Cast ==
- Lola Kelly as Joan of Arc
- Arundel Nixon as Pierre Cauchon
- Queenie Ashton as Colette de Chartier
- Ronald Morse as Durand Lassois
- Colin McAlister
- Harvey Adams as Governor of Vaucouleurs
- Ron Randell
- Dan Agar
- Frank Bradley
- John Nugent-Hayward
- Warren Barry
- John Cazabon
- John Saul as Martin Ladvenu
- Leonard Bennett.
