= Below the Surface (1938 film) =

1938 adventure film set in the coal region of Newcastle, Australia

- Directed by: Rupert Kathner
- Screenplay by: Rupert Kathner
- Story by: Stan Tolhurst
- Produced by: Rupert Kathner
- Starring: Stan Tolhurst
- Cinematography: Tasman Higgins
- Edited by: Stan Tolhurst
- Production company: Australian Cinema Entertainments
- Release date: 1938
- Running time: 55 minutes
- Country: Australia
- Language: English

Below the Surface is a 1938 adventure film set in the coal region of Newcastle, New South Wales. Only part of the movie survives.

== Plot ==
Two miners compete for an important coal contract. One of them attempts to sabotage the other but fails.

== Cast ==
- Stan Tolhurst
- Phyllis Reilly
- Neil Carlton
- Jimmy McMahon
- Lawrence Taylor
- Reg King
- Billy Baker
- Leonard Clarke
- Frank Baker
- Billy Crooks

== Production ==
The main investor in the movie was a prominent music house in Sydney. The film was shot on location in Cronulla, Sydney and Newcastle, with studio work done at Pagewood Studios. Kather and Tolhurt built a mine set themselves. Shooting took place from November 1937 to February 1938.

== Release ==
Like Kathner's first movie, Phantom Gold (1937), it was refused to be considered eligible for registration under the New South Wales Film Quota Act on the grounds of poor quality.

The film was never released to cinemas, the only one of Kather's movies to suffer this fate.

In February 1938 Australian Cinema Entertainments announced plans to make four more features that year for £40,000, the first which was to be Diamonds in the Rough. This did not eventuate. Tolhurst did revive the name with his company, ACE Films, in the late 1940s.
