= Silent Company =

Studio album by Black Majesty
- Released: 27 June 2005
- Recorded: Palm Studios, Melbourne, Australia; K.A.R.O. Studios, Germany; Music Factory, Germany
- Genre: Power metal
- Length: 59:46
- Label: LMP
- Producer: Endel Rivers; Piet Sielck; Black Majesty

Black Majesty chronology
Sands of Time (2003)	Silent Company (2005)	Tomorrowland (2007)

Silent Company is the second album by Australian power metal band, Black Majesty, which was released on 27 June 2005 via their German-based label, Limb Music.

Justin Donnelly of The Metal Forge rated the album at seven-out-of ten stars and explained "a solid release, and a worthy follow up to Sands of Time... [but it] sees the band relying on their known strengths rather than delving into new territory and trying something new."

== Track listing ==
All songs written by Black Majesty, except track 3, written by Jon English.

1. "Dragon Reborn" - 6:05
2. "Silent Company" - 4:28
3. "Six Ribbons" - 3:22
4. "Firestorm" - 5:27
5. "New Horizons" - 5:28
6. "Darkened Room" - 5:13
7. "Visionary" - 4:46
8. "Never Surrender" - 4:36
9. "A Better Way to Die" - 7:37

== Credits ==
=== Band members ===
- John "Gio" Cavaliere − lead vocals
- Stevie Janevski − guitars, backing vocals
- Hanny Mohamed − guitars, keyboards
- Pavel Konvalinka − drums

=== Additional musicians ===
- Evan Harris − Bass
- Jason Old - Backing Vocals on tracks 2, 4, 5, 6 & 7
- Susie Goritchan - Backing Vocals on track 3
- Endel Rivers - Keyboards

=== Production and other arrangements ===
- Endel Rivers - Engineering, Mixing, Production
- Piet Sielck - Drum track recording
- Christian Schmid - Mastering
- Dirk Illing - Cover concept, artwork
- Thomas Ewerhard - Sleeve design
