= That Certain Something =

- Directed by: Clarence G. Badger
- Written by: Clarence G. Badger
- Produced by: Frederick Daniell
- Starring: Megan Edwards; Thelma Grigg
- Cinematography: Arthur Higgins
- Edited by: Frank Coffey
- Production company: Argosy Films
- Distributed by: RKO
- Release date: 1941
- Running time: 90 mins
- Country: Australia
- Language: English
- Budget: £12,500

That Certain Something is a 1941 Australian musical film directed by Clarence G. Badger and starring Megan Edwards and Thelma Grigg. The plot concerns an American film director who decides to make a musical in Australia. It was the last film directed by Badger, a noted silent era director.

== Plot ==
A famous director, Robert Grimble, comes to Australia to make a film about pioneering women and seeks for an unknown to play the lead role. He casts socialist Miss Hemingway, who soon proves to be temperamental. She is tricked into walking off the job by Jimmie Jones who wants his girlfriend Patsy cast. He succeeds and Patsy becomes a star.

== Cast ==
- Megan Edwards as Patsy O'Connell
- Thelma Grigg as Miss Hemmingway
- Georgie Sterling as Blanche Wright
- Lou Vernon as Robert Grimble
- Charles Kilburn as Allan Burke
- Joe Lawman as Bill Lake
- Howard Craven as Jimmie Jones
- Ronald Morse as Marcel du Bois
- Leslie Victor as Maurice Appleby
- Marshall Crosby
- Connie Martyn
- Raymond Longford
- Ross Vernon
- William Beresford
- John Byrne
- Arundel Nixon
- Francis Birtles as bushman

== Production ==
The film was the first from Argosy Films and was made with the assistance of a bank overdraft from the New South Wales government. It was directed by Clarence Badger, a Hollywood director who had retired to Australia. The original title was Daughters of Australia.

Badger was commissioned to make a story in Australia. He did not want to make a war story or heavy drama but something bright. He felt "Australia deserves something better than the 'hayseed' angle, which has, for the most part, predominated in film stories for Australian productions." So he decided to write his own story, based in part on his experiences in Australia of being pursued by aspiring actors. "I never realised that there were-so many amateur players in Australia. Every second person I met seemed to belong to some dramatic group or little theatre." The story of the script has many personal elements from Badger's experiences making Rangle River.

Most of the cast came from actors in radio. Megan Edwards had only appeared in a few stage shows before being cast in the lead. She later received a three-year contract from a Hollywood manager. Howard Craven was her romantic lead.

The seven-week shoot took place at Pagewood Studios; it was first movie made there in three years. Filming started April 1940. The colonial sequence was especially researched. The camera crew included notable cameraman John Howes, who died aged 29.

The Bulletin declared in April 1940 "About 300 persons are employed, and the first venture is described as a film set in Australia without being too conscious of the fact."

== Reception ==
Despite securing distribution from RKO, reception to the film from critics and the public was poor.

Variety wrote "So-so fare for minor spot in minor zones. Given a city bid, pic zeroed right from preem, slapping house into a loss on forced two weeks. Useless for U. S.; likewise doubtful if British dates would mean much unless there’s a drastic. shortage of product there. Clarence Badger... has brought nothing new to the screen with this homebrewer. Cast, recruited mostly from the radio field, shows little screen talent."

Wireless Weekly called it "perhaps the most ambitious film made in this country, from the viewpoint that it does not glorify Australia or the Australian race, but sets out to tell a story which could have happened in any metropolis. Director Clarence Badger has done a fine job of work in this story."

Filmink declared the movie "looks very slick and is briskly directed by Badger. However, he lets himself down badly with his script, which lacks focus and dramatic stakes." Nonetheless, it was argued the film is worth watching because of its cast and autobiographical elements for Badger.

In Rupert Kathner's 1945 book Let's Make a Movie!, he recalls a theatre operator "with tears flowing from his eyes" saying "I've tried to lead a decent life, never intentionally did anyone a bad turn, struggled hard to pay my way - and now, after all this, they make me show a picture like That Certain Something."
