= Racing Luck =

Racing Luck may refer to:

- Racing Luck (1924 film), a 1924 American silent film
- Racing Luck (1935 film), a 1935 American action film
- Racing Luck (1941 film), a 1941 Australian comedy film
- Racing Luck (1948 film), a 1948 American sports film
