= Pegazus =

Australian heavy metal band

- Origin: Melbourne, Victoria, Australia
- Genres: Heavy metal, power metal
- Years active: 1993–present
- Label: Nuclear Blast
- Members: Johnny Stoj; Andrew Sharp; Matt Ambrose; Joe Stanley
- Past members: Robbie Stoj; Rob Thompson; Hanny Mohammed; Danny Cecati; Joe Fata; Dave King; Justin Fleming; Cory Betts; Axel Winter; Ange Sotiro
- Website: pegazusofficial.com

Pegazus are an Australian heavy metal band from Melbourne. The band was formed in late 1993 by guitarist Johnny Stoj came to international notice in 1998 after being signed to Nuclear Blast records. The band has released five studio albums, the most recent being In Metal We Trust in 2011. While they have appeared at the Wacken Open Air festival and toured Europe twice, since around 2000 Pegazus has played only in Australia with multiple east coast shows.

== History ==
Pegazus was formed in 1993 in Melbourne by guitarist Johnny Stoj with his brother Robbie on drums. After cultivating a visual and musical style similar to bands like Judas Priest and Manowar, the band recorded a self-titled album in 1995 with Justin Fleming on vocals and Dave King on bass. The following year, Fleming was replaced by Danny Cecati and the band recorded a new demo and began seeking a record deal. Linking up with Melbourne's Metal Warriors, the band's second album Wings of Destiny was released locally in 1997. After receiving a copy of the album, Germany's Nuclear Blast Records offered the band a contract and released Wings of Destiny worldwide with more distinctive, professional artwork.

In August 1998, Pegazus travelled to Germany to perform at the Wacken Open Air festival. The show was remarkable not only as the first the band had ever played outside Melbourne but because they appeared at the festival twice, on the main stage and again on a side-stage later as a replacement for Darkseed. Following Wacken, the band returned to Australia briefly before going back to Europe in September to tour with HammerFall. Eric Martins played bass at all of these shows as King had left the band.

Corey Betts joined Pegazus as King's replacement in January 1999 and very little was heard from the group until the Breaking the Chains album was released late in the year. Controversy followed shortly after when it was revealed in March 2000 that Cecati had been fired for apparently devoting too much time to another Melbourne band called Anarion. Cecati countered by claiming that he had become frustrated with the virtual inactivity of Pegazus as a live act and Johnny Stoj's creative control over the group. He subsequently also left Anarion and joined Eyefear in late 2000.

In September 2000, Rob Thompson(Headrush, Powersurge, Sweet Cyanide) replaced Cecati. Pegazus then toured interstate in January 2001, playing their first shows outside of Melbourne since the European tour in September 1998. At approximately the same, Betts formed another band, Kymera, with ex-members of Cyclone Tracy and Catwitch, but would remain with Pegazus until after the recording of the next album. Kymera would later become Black Majesty.

The Headless Horseman, released in 2002, was the first Pegazus album in three years and would prove to be its last for Nuclear Blast. Following Betts' departure, Black Majesty guitarist Hanny Mohammed became the band's bass player for its infrequent live appearances. Robbie Stoj then left Pegazus in September 2003, with Bernie Goldstein temporarily filling the role, and the band recorded some performances for a live album. In the meantime, the group's relationship with Nuclear Blast came to an end with Pegazus claiming the label had virtually ignored its previous release. The live album Live! – Thunder Down Under was released independently by the band in February 2004. At around the same time, Robbie Stoj was finally replaced by Ange Sotiro and Betts by Joe Fata, who had ironically also replaced him briefly in Black Majesty.

After several years of inactivity Pegazus returned to the live circuit in 2009, Rob Thompson left the band some time earlier after the death of his daughter, and was replaced by original vocalist Justin Fleming. Corey Betts also returned to the fold, replacing Joe Fata on bass. The band played comeback shows in both Melbourne and Sydney in early 2009 and released In Metal We Trust in 2011.Which followed with a European tour, Former Vocalist Rob Thompson volunteered to rejoin the band as Bass Player, and the Band spent the next 5 weeks playing 13 shows in 11 countries, for their "In Rock We Trust" tour, Thompson departed again on their return to Australia. In 2013 it was announced that Justin Fleming had left the band again. He was replaced by new singer Axel Winter. The band played their first show with Winter in August. Drummer Andrew Sharp also joins and they played several Melbourne and Sydney shows until December 2015. January 2016 saw the departure of Corey Betts and Axel Winter. Axel went on to join Skärlet. New members Joe Stanley on vocals and Matt Ambrose on bass were announced by Johhny Stoj as of June 2016. They have since played Hobart, Brisbane, Sydney, Newcastle, Victorian country shows as well as several home town Melbourne shows and are currently writing new material.

In late 2019, Cecati formed the hard rock band Wicked Smile with Black Majesty founding member Steve Janevski.

== Discography ==
=== Studio albums ===
- Pegazus (1995)
- Wings of Destiny (1997)
- Breaking the Chains (1999)
- The Headless Horseman (2002)
- In Metal We Trust (2011)

=== Live albums ===
- Live! Thunder Down Under (2004)
- Mythology Chapter II (2006) video
