= Bush Christmas (1947 film) =

1947 Australian film by Ralph Smart

- Directed by: Ralph Smart
- Written by: Ralph Smart
- Produced by: Ralph Smart
- Starring: Chips Rafferty; John Fernside
- Narrated by: John McCallum
- Cinematography: George Heath
- Edited by: James Pearson
- Music by: Sydney John Kay
- Production company: Children's Entertainment Films
- Distributed by: Rank Organization
- Release dates: June 1947 (UK); 19 December 1947 (Australia)
- Running time: 76 minutes
- Countries: Australia; United Kingdom
- Language: English
- Budget: £25,000 or £15,000

Bush Christmas is a 1947 Australian–British comedy film directed by Ralph Smart and starring Chips Rafferty. It was one of the first films from Children's Entertainment Films, later the Children's Film Foundation.

== Plot ==
In the Australian countryside, five children are best friends, including a set of siblings, an English war evacuee, and Aboriginal Neza. They boast to three strangers, Long Bill, Jim and Blue, about the mare belonging to the father of one of them. The next day the mare has gone. Suspecting the three men of stealing it, the children set off to recover it.

They discover the horse thieves and harass them by stealing their food and shoes. They get trapped by the thieves in an old ghost town, but are rescued in time.

== Cast ==
- Chips Rafferty as Long Bill
- John Fernside as Jim
- Stan Tolhurst as Blue
- Helen Grieve as Helen
- Nick Yardley as Snow
- Morris Unicomb as John
- Michael Yardley as Michael
- Neza Saunders as Neza
- Pat Penny as father
- Thelma Grigg as mother
- Clyde Combo as Old Jack
- Edmund Allison as policeman

== Development ==
Children's Entertainment Films had been set up by Mary Field for the Rank Organisation to make films to be screened to children in cinema clubs throughout England on Saturday mornings.

In August 1945, it was announced that Ralph Smart would write and direct Bush Christmas for exhibition in the cinema clubs. Smart was an Englishman who had worked in Australia during the war. He wanted to make a children's film but had been unable to find a suitable story so decided to write one himself. He wrote the script for maximum action and minimum dialogue.

It was to be the first in a series of children's films set in the Empire.

The film was financed by the Rank Organisation, which had also financed The Overlanders (1946) in Australia. Smart had worked on that film, which made a star of Chips Rafferty who signed on to star in Bush Christmas. He also assisted in casting.

Bush Christmas was originally planned as a serial, but it was then decided to turn it into a feature.

Several cast members from The Overlanders appear, including Chips Rafferty, John Fernside and Helen Grieve. Grieve was the first choice for her role. Michael and Nick Yardley were brothers who had worked in radio. Neza Saunders came from a mission station near Rockhampton and was discovered by Chips Rafferty. Morris Unicomb was a veteran of stage and radio.

== Shooting ==
The film was entirely shot on location in March 1946. Filming took place in the Capertee Valley and at Kanangra Tops and Burragarong Valley, in the Blue Mountains. They also did a week's work at Carr Park, Kogarah.

Neza Saunders fell off a horse while filming but had recovered within two days.

Post production was completed in Sydney by June 1946. Smart left Australia in October, promising to be back in a few months to make more movies; he took four scenarios with him.

== Release ==
Reviews were positive.

Rank were so happy with the movie that instead of just playing it in cinema clubs they released it as a support feature for Frieda.

=== Box office ===
The film was very popular in Britain and Australia and was seen in 41 countries. Variety said it did "solid biz" in Australia.

It was reportedly among the most popular films of the year in Britain in 1947, along with Courtneys of Curzon Street, Great Expectations, Duel in the Sun, Odd Man Out, Jassy, The Upturned Glass, Black Narcissus, Holiday Camp, They Made Me A Fugitive and The Jolson Story.

By February 1948 the film had screened on American television.

== Spin Offs ==
It was serialised in children's magazines and a novelisation of the script was published. The film was also adapted for radio with a young John Meillon.

== Follow Up ==
When Smart returned to Australia in January 1947 he announced plans for £150,000 worth of children's films in Australia, including a feature set on a Northern Territory outback station, a serial, and a series of documentary films. Yardley signed a contract to appear in the Territory film and also the serial, which was to be about buckjumping.

These films did not eventuate. Smart made Bitter Springs with Rafferty in 1950.

Helen Grieve decided to study science rather than pursue an acting career. Yardley later became newsworthy when his nose was broken in a boomerang-throwing accident.

The success of the film led to it being remade in 1983. In addition it presumably inspired the filming of Smiley in 1956.

== See also ==
- Bush Christmas (1983 remake)
