= Phantom Gold =

Phantom Gold may refer to:

- Phantom Gold (1936 film), an Australian adventure film
- Phantom Gold (1938 film), an American Western film
