= I Got a Feeling =

I Got a Feeling, or similar, may refer to:

== I Got a Feeling ==
- "I Got a Feeling" (Four Tops song), 1983
- "I Got a Feeling" (Ricky Nelson song), 1958
- "I Got a Feelin'" (Billy Currington song), 2004
- "I Gotta Feeling", a song by Black Eyed Peas in 2009
- "I Got a Feelin'", a song by Willie Phelps in 1957
- "I Got a Feeling", a 2021 song by Felix Jaehn and Robin Schulz
- "I Gotta Feelin (Just Nineteen)", a 2006 song by Eagles of Death Metal

== I've Got a Feeling ==
- "I've Got a Feeling", a song by The Beatles in 1970
- "I've Got a Feeling" (The Sands of Time song), 1970
- "I've Got a Feeling" (Ivy song), 1997

== I Got the Feeling ==
- "I Got the Feelin'", a song by James Brown in 1968
  - I Got the Feelin' (album), a 1968 album by James Brown
- "I Got the Feeling",, a song by Today from their album The New Formula
- "I Got the Feelin' (Oh No, No)", a song by Neil Diamond in 1966

== See also ==
- "I Got a Feelin' in My Body", by Elvis Presley in 1979
- "Got a Feeling", song by Tim Hicks from Throw Down, 2013
