= Beyond Reality =

Beyond Reality may refer to:

- Beyond Reality (TV series), a 1991 Canadian/American science fiction series
- Beyond Reality (album), an album by Dreamtale
- "Beyond Reality", a song by Black Majesty from Sands of Time
- "Beyond Reality", a song by Cyann & Ben from Spring
- "Beyond Reality", a song by Savage Circus from Dreamland Manor
