= The Power and the Glory (1941 film) =

- Directed by: Noel Monkman
- Written by: Noel Monkman; Harry Lauder
- Based on: story 'A Man Without a Country' by Noel Monkman
- Starring: Peter Finch; Katrin Rosselle
- Cinematography: Arthur Higgins; George Malcolm (aerial photography)
- Edited by: Frank Coffey
- Music by: Henry Kripps
- Production company: Argosy Films
- Distributed by: MGM
- Release date: 1941
- Running time: 93 mins
- Country: Australia
- Language: English
- Budget: £12,500

The Power and the Glory is a 1941 Australian war film about a Czech scientist who escapes from the Nazis to live in Australia. It features an early screen performance by Peter Finch.

== Plot ==
In Europe, a peaceful Czech scientist, Professor Marnelle, has unintentionally developed a nerve gas while working on a new fuel. Marnelle doesn't want to use his invention for evil but he's threatened by his Nazi masters, including Von Schweig with a concentration camp. Marnelle destroys his lab and manages to escape with his daughter Elsa – but is then recaptured.

We then meet two members of the British secret service who are in a café – when another man is arrested the two of them flee. They trick a passing German car into stopping and knock them out – to discover Marnelle and his daughter are in the back seat, prisoners. They take the Germans uniforms, drive the prisoners to the airport and manage to escape in a plane. The Marnelles go to Australia but the Nazis find out about it and decide to track him there.

Marnelle starts working for the Australian air force and meets pilot Frank Miller. Nazi officer Von Schweig arrives in Australia and meets up with local fifth columnists who are planning sabotage on Australian planes – Miller's ends up crashing and he winds up in hospital.

By this stage the war has started and there is a scene where Von Schweig and a fifth columnist, Dr Vass, look at some Australian soldiers marching past. Von Schweig says "we did not expect the enthusiasm of the dominions" for the war. Dr Vass says that he has been in Australia for a number of years and still does not understand them, adding that "you expect from their interest in sport that nothing else matters, but in war the greater the danger the harder they fought".

Miller and his friend Ted Jackson visit the Marnelles in their rural hideaway, where they are looked after by a comic Chinaman; Ted has fallen for Elsa. The fifth columnists and Von Schweig meet up with a spy who is revealed to be Frank Miller. Miller tells them where to find the scientist; they capture and start torturing him to find the formula.

The Germans are about to take the Marnelles back to Europe but Mack manages to sneak off and inform the authorities. Ted Jackson rescues Marnelle but Miller's treachery enables the Germans to take off with the formula. Jackson hops in a plane and flies after Miller and Von Schweig, shooting them down in a dog fight. A German U-boat is also destroyed.

== Cast ==
- Katrin Rosselle as Els Marnelle
- Eric Bush as Ted Jackson
- Lou Vernon as Professor Marnelle
- Eric Reiman as Von Schweig
- Peter Finch as Frank Miller
- Sidney Wheeler as His Excellency
- Charles Kilburn as John Burton
- Joe Valli as Mack
- John Fernside as Dr Vass
- Max Osbiston as flight leader
- Beatrice Wenban as Freda
- Harry Abdy as Fritz Grubler
- Horace Cleary as Wong
- Ron Dargin as Bluey
- Clement Kennedy as Weary
- Raymond Longford as Nazi Admiral

== Production ==
It was the second feature film from Noel Monkman, following Typhoon Treasure (1938).

The story was an original one by Monkman, who then worked on the script with Harry Lauder. Filming commenced in June 1940. Shooting took place at Fig Tree Studios in Hunters Hill, Sydney with additional scenes shot at Camden. Financing was made possible by an overdraft guaranteed by the New South Wales government.

The female star, Katrin Roselle, was an Austrian migrant who married an Australian then moved to Hollywood after the film was made. Most of the cast came from radio.

Finch was injured during filming when wind filled an open parachute he was holding and pulled him off his feet at the RAAF base at Camden.

The freighter Turkana which appears in the movie was sunk soon after filming by a German raider.

Frederick Daniell, General Manager of Argosy, said:

The final phase of the picture builds up to Australia’s magnificent effort in providing fine aeroplanes and fine men to man them. There is no better illustration of the Australian s adaptability than his capability in the air. The youngest nation in the world, it is foremost, on a population basis, in aviation. With only seven million people, we have produced a notable number of air pioneers. It is this theme which is the background of ‘The Power and the Glory’.

== Release ==
Distribution was done through MGM, the first time that company had handled an Australian feature film.

The Chief Films Censor, Cresswell O'Reilly, ruled that the film was not suitable for general exhibition (i.e. for adults and not children) but this was overturned on appeal. Filmink declared " it’s just one of the many examples of cultural gatekeepers trying to hurt the cause of Australian cinema."

The movie received generally positive reviews. However Monkman directed no further feature films.

Ken G. Hall "wasn’t impressed by" Monkman's first feature, Typhoon Treasure and felt The Power and the Glory "had a pompous title. It was all wrong because it showed Australia being saved by a Wirraway Airforce in 1940 when the war was closing in around us. But Monkman’s direction was very good I thought."

The movie was re-released in 1952 as The Invaders.

Filmink declared the movie was:

Glorious over the top fun, with top-notch Nazi ham acting from Wheeler and Reiman, a typically strong performance from Finch, a script that feels as though it was made up as it goes along, and plenty of pace and action – last minute escapes, car crashes, fifth columnists who press a button in their living room making a painting revolve around to reveal a picture of Hitler, etc. It has faults – silliness of course, and 1940s cinematic racism, but also we don’t know who our main hero is until the film is more than half over, and when we do know who it is (Eric Bush), he isn’t very charismatic. But it is entertaining.
