= Wings of Destiny =

- Film poster
- Directed by: Rupert Kathner
- Written by: Rupert Kathner; Alma Brooks
- Produced by: Rupert Kathner
- Starring: Marshall Crosby; John Fernside
- Cinematography: Arthur Higgins; Tasman Higgins; Joe Stafford
- Edited by: Syd Wood
- Production company: Enterprise Film Company
- Distributed by: National Films
- Release date: 13 September 1940
- Running time: 68 minutes
- Country: Australia
- Language: English

Wings of Destiny is a 1940 action war film directed, produced and co-written by Rupert Kathner for the Enterprise Film Company and starring Marshall Crosby and John Fernside.

== Plot ==
The film is about the activities of fifth columnists in Australia during the Second World War. Wings of Destiny was one of the first films of the war to depict fifth columnists as well as the aboriginal Australians. (Note: A special mention in the program, identifies the help of the Arunta tribe of Central Australia.)

A group of Australian officials are investigating a reported discovery of wolframite, a strategic material needed for the manufacture of munitions. The rich mineral is found in central Australia on land owned by Frederick Jamieson (Marshall Crosby), a rich businessman. They also realize that German agent, Mark Heinrich (John Fernside) is behind an attempt to steal the war matériel.

When an aircraft flown by Jamieson's pilot, Jerry Marsden (Jim McMahon), is sabotaged by Heinrich, the aircraft is forced down in the outback. Marsden and mechanic Monty Martin (George Lloyd) survive and encounter "Mulga" Flannigan (Reginald King), an old prospector who warns the pair about the dangers of the outback. The next morning, in affirmation of the lurid tales Mulga has told, another prospector staggers into their improvised campsite, with a spear wound and soon dies. Aboriginals, including Peters (Raymond Longford, a bushman, offers to help them.

An aircraft flown by Tommy Ryan (Johnny Williams) swoops low over the stranded fliers, but Ryan, who is working for Heinrich, flies on to Alice Springs. Ryan lies about what he had seen, telling Marion (Patricia McDonald), Jamieson's daughter, who loves Marsden, that the young pilot was killed. Ryan was told to kill Marsden but tries to find a way to double cross the enemy agent.

Deciding to press his advantage, Heinrich visits Jamieson, hoping to force the businessman to surrender his claim on the wolframite mineral. The meeting devolves into violence and Jamieson is shot and killed. Marion is threatened but Ryan appears to confront him. Ultimately, Marion is rescued and Heinrich is apprehended.

== Cast ==
- Marshall Crosby as Frederick Jamieson
- John Fernside as Mark Heinrich
- George Lloyd as Monty Martin
- Cecil Perry as Arthur Rogers
- Johnny Williams as Tommy Ryan
- Jim McMahon as Jerry Marsden
- Reginald King as "Mulga" Flannigan
- Patricia McDonald as Marion Jamieson
- Raymond Longford as Peters
- Stan Robinson as prospector

== Production ==
Wings of Destiny was shot, in part, on location at the Sydney waterfront and featured footage of aboriginal tribal life from Kathner's earlier film, Phantom Gold (1937). It reportedly took two years to research and six months to film at a cost of "thousands of good Australian pounds."

Raymond Longford has a small role as an old bushman who rescues the party in the desert.

The aircraft used in Wings of Destiny was a Ryan Brougham.

== Release ==
Wings of Destiny was previewed to the press, after which some scenes at Alice Springs were deleted and a courtroom scene was added to the end of the film. It was passed for registration as an Australian quota production under the Film Quota Act and released in September 1940. Reviews and public reception were poor.

The critic from The Sydney Morning Herald called Wings of Destiny:

... A very inferior picture... The story contains evidence and imagination, and the film has some good photography, but the camera is never allowed to roam, so that almost every interior scene is focussed on some corner of a room, and remains there until the scene ends. The exterior scenes are much better... Occasionally dramatic tension is achieved, also some good Australian characterisation.
