= Sands of Time (Black Majesty album) =

Studio album by Black Majesty
- Released: 2003
- Recorded: Palm Studios, Melbourne, Australia
- Genre: Power metal
- Length: 55:29
- Label: LMP
- Producers: Endel Rivers; Black Majesty

Black Majesty chronology
Sands of Time EP (2002)	Sands of Time (2003)	Silent Company (2005)

Sands of Time is the debut album by the Australian power metal band Black Majesty.

== Track listing ==
All songs written by Black Majesty, except 1, 3, 6 and 9, written by Black Majesty & Cory Betts.

1. "Fall of the Reich" − 5:16
2. "Legacy" − 4:16
3. "Guardian" − 6:57
4. "Sands of Time" − 5:40
5. "Destination" − 1:13
6. "Journey's End" − 6:23
7. "Colliding Worlds" − 5:12
8. "No Sanctuary" − 6:44
9. "Beyond Reality" − 8:19
10. "Lady of the Lake" − 5:24

== Credits ==
=== Band members ===
- John "Gio" Cavaliere − lead vocals
- Stevie Janevski − guitars, backing vocals
- Hanny Mohamed − guitars, keyboards
- Pavel Konvalinka − drums

=== Additional musicians ===
- Evan Harris − Bass on tracks 2, 4, 5, 6, 7, 8 & 10
- Cory Betts − Bass on tracks 1, 3 & 9
- Danny Cecati - Dual vocal on track 3
- Silvio Massaro - Dual vocal on track 7 & backing vocals on track 10
- Pep Samartino - Keyboards and backing vocals on tracks 3 & 9
- Jason Old - Backing Vocals on tracks 2, 4, 6 & 8
- Endel Rivers - Keyboards on tracks 1, 2, 4, 7 & 8
- Jayden Middleton - Young boy laughing vocals

=== Production and other arrangements ===
- Endel Rivers - Engineering, Mixing, Mastering
- Dirk Illing - Cover concept, artwork
- Thomas Ewerhard - Sleeve design
