= The Body Corporate =

- Written by: Robert Caswell
- Directed by: Eric Taylor
- Starring: Leonard Teale; Pat McDonald; Mervyn Drake
- Country of origin: Australia
- Original language: English

Production
- Running time: 80 mins
- Production company: ABC

Original release
- Network: ABC
- Release: 1983

The Body Corporate is a 1983 Australian television film directed by Eric Taylor and starring Leonard Teale, Pat McDonald, and Mervyn Drake.
