= Marshall Crosby =

Australian actor and singer

- Born: Joseph Alexander Crosby; 18 February 1882; Caltowie, South Australia, Australia
- Died: 1 January 1954 (aged 72); Port Macquarie, New South Wales, Australia
- Occupation(s): Actor, singer
- Family: Don Crosby (son)

Joseph Alexander Crosby (18 February 1882 – 1 January 1954) known professionally as Marshall Crosby, was a popular Australian actor and singer of vaudeville, theatre, radio, film and television.

== Biography ==
Crosby was born the twelfth of thirteen children in Caltowie, South Australia of Walter Thomas Crosby, an English school teacher and his wife Ann Cameron. After schooling he initially worked as a clerk at the post office, before becoming a telephonist.

He started his professional show business career after auditioning as a baritone with the theatrical company of Leslie Harrison, and worked in vaudeville with Henry Clay and Harry Rickards, he also performed with the Tivoli Theatre before appearing in a number of musicals for J. C. Williamson Ltd, and also in revues and operetta burlesque. In the early 1930s he started to take small roles in films and had parts in Dad and Dave Come to Town, Smithy and Eureka Stockade. He was a leading radio actor, remembered for his role as "Josh Roberts" in the long running ABC radio serial Blue Hills.

He was a supporter of the Labor Party of Australia and a trade unionist involved with the actors union, Actors and Announcers Equity Association of Australia. He married Theresa King on 25 April 1907. He was the father of actor and radio producer Don Crosby, who was an Order of Australia recipient.

== Filmography ==
| Year | Title | Role | Notes |
|---|---|---|---|
| 1932 | His Royal Highness | Alfam | |
| 1933 | Harmony Row | Sergeant | |
| 1934 | Clara Gibbings | Tudor | |
| 1934 | A Ticket in Tatts | Mr. Summers | |
| 1937 | The Broken Melody | Rowing Trainer | |
| 1937 | The Avenger | Detective Sergeant O'Neill | |
| 1938 | Dad and Dave Come to Town | Ryan Sr. | |
| 1940 | Dad Rudd, MP | Ryan | Reprised his role from Dad and Dave Come to Town |
| 1940 | Wings of Destiny | Francis Jamieson | |
| 1941 | That Certain Something | Stephen Appleby | |
| 1941 | Racing Luck | Sir Reginald Franklin | |
| 1946 | Smithy | Arthur Powell | |
| 1946 | The Overlanders | Minister | |
| 1949 | Eureka Stockade | Sullivan, the postmaster | Uncredited |
| 1952 | Kangaroo | Gambler | Uncredited, (final film role) |
