= Lou Vernon =

Australian actor

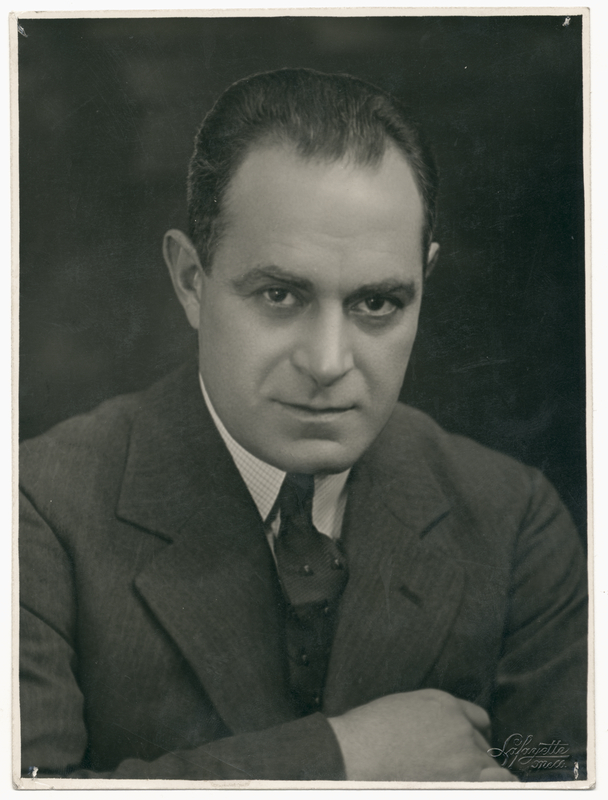
- Photograph by Lafayette, circa 1940
- Born: Clarence Alphone Lambert; 26 June 1888; Fortitude Valley, Queensland, Australia
- Died: 22 December 1971 (aged 83); Sydney, Australia
- Occupations: Actor, producer
- Spouses: Olive Stella Josephine Lockyer Sinclair (m. 1917; div. 1937) Asthore Sarah Katherine Taunton (m. 1937; died 1965)
- Children: Ross Vernon

Lou Vernon (born Clarence Alphonse Lambert, 26 June 1888 – 22 December 1971) was an Australian singer, vaudevillian, actor of stage, radio and screen and producer. He started his career in musical comedy, and was particularly noted for his versatility and ability as a character actor.

Roy Rene in his memoir mentioned Lou worked with him in the comedy farce, "Give and Take". It was described in The Bulletin, "There has not been so much laughter in any one spot in Melbourne for months and months".

== Early life ==
Vernon was born as Clarence Alphonse Lambert in Fortitude Valley, Queensland, the seventh of eight children to Frenchman Louis Lambert and Eliza Colton of Newport, Wales.

By 1917 we find Vernon in Sydney making substantial inroads into Sydney's theatre scene. He also found love in Olive Stella Josephine Lockyer Norris, (née Sinclair). The two were married at Waverley in 1917. Olive had a child, not to her then husband, but to Lou Vernon. Olive was four years older than her husband. Their child, Ross Vernon would later show ambitions into theatre. However that was not to be. As Flt. Lieutenant Walter Ross Vernon, leading a second bombing sortie over Mawaraka, Bougainville, Ross crashed his RAAF bomber during World War II and was killed 11 January 1945.

== Career ==
Vernon by the mid-1920s was engaged by the J.C. Williamson Company and landed the plum role of Emile La Flamme in Rudolph Friml's romantic musical Rose-Marie. Also in the cast was Fifi Banvard, at the time separated from her husband and fellow member of Thespian Masonic Lodge in Brisbane, Edward de Tisne. The several times extended season of Rose-Marie provided the venue for a long tempestuous love affair between Fifi and Lou Vernon. Rose Marie ran non-stop until 1928. A tolerant Mrs. Olive Vernon, meanwhile kept her own counsel only instigating divorce proceedings against Vernon a decade later in 1937

1937 was a busy year for Vernon. His marriage to Olive had somehow survived twenty turbulent years. However, by 1937 it ended in divorce. Vernon was now free to marry long-time friend Asthore Sarah Katherine Taunton (1907–1965). Asthore Sarah Taunton (Tory) was a dance teacher and choreographer whom Vernon met through theatre. They remained married until Tory's death in 1965.

=== Death ===
Vernon's last three years were spent in retirement in his Vaucluse home. Most of his contemporaries in acting and entertainment had either retired or passed on when Vernon 'got his call' dying just before Christmas, 1971. He was cremated at Northern Suburbs Crematorium, Sydney, on Christmas Eve, 1971.

Indeed, in his obituary headline in 1971 the Canberra Times writes "Dr. Mac" dead at 83, as a tribute to his role as Dr. Robert McIntyre in the long running radio program "Dr. Mac".

== Filmography ==
Year	Title	Role	Notes
1931	The Exile	District Attorney	
1932	His Royal Highness	Torano	
1939	Come Up Smiling	Signor Rudolpho	
1939	Gone to the Dogs	Doctor Sundermann	
1941	The Power and the Glory	Professor Marnelle	
1941	That Certain Something	Robert Gimble	
1948	The Betrayal	Ned Washington	
1957	The Shiralee	Goon	
1959	On the Beach	Bill Davidson	
1959	Captain James Cook	Aboriginal Legend	
1969	Tilley Landed On Our Shore		
1969	You Can't See 'round Corners	Nugget	

== Sources ==
- Mo's Memoirs. (ghostwritten by Elizabeth Lambert and Max Harris) Melb: Reed and Harris, 1945.
- Photograph from the Performing Arts Collection
- "Dr. Mac" of radio dies at 83
