= The Lady Craved Excitement =

1950 British film by Francis Searle

- Directed by: Francis Searle
- Written by: John Gilling; Francis Searle
- Based on: a BBC radio serial by Edward J. Mason
- Produced by: Anthony Hinds
- Starring: Hy Hazell; Michael Medwin; Sidney James; Andrew Keir
- Cinematography: Walter J. Harvey
- Edited by: John Ferris
- Music by: Frank Spencer
- Production company: Hammer Films
- Distributed by: Exclusive Films (UK)
- Release date: September 1950 (UK)
- Running time: 60 mins
- Country: United Kingdom
- Language: English

The Lady Craved Excitement is a 1950 British comedy second feature ('B') film directed by Francis Searle and starring Hy Hazell, Michael Medwin and Sid James. It was written by John Gilling based on the 1949 BBC radio serial The Lady Craved Excitement by Edward J. Mason. An early Hammer film, it is significant as one of five films shot at Oakley Court and the first to feature its famous exterior, located next door to Bray Studios. Filming took place from Feb. 28, 1950 through March 31st. It was trade shown on July 27, 1950, and released in September.

== Plot ==
Pat's craving for excitement hampers cabaret artists Pat and Johnny's careers. She leads them into a number of dangerous situations, but also helps to uncover a conspiracy to smuggle valuable works of art out of the country.

== Cast ==
- Hy Hazell as Pat
- Michael Medwin as Johnny
- Sidney James as Carlo
- Thelma Grigg as Julia Lafaine
- Andrew Keir as Septimus K. Peterson
- Danny Green as Boris
- John Longden as Inspector James
- Ian Wilson as Mugsy
- Barbara Hamilton as 1st chorus girl
- Jasmine Dee as 2nd chorus girl
- Gordon Mulholland as lunatic

== Critical reception ==
The Monthly Film Bulletin wrote: "A light crime-comedy with some impossible and quite amusing situations; suitable entertainment for the young."

In British Sound Films: The Studio Years 1928–1959 David Quinlan rated the film as "mediocre", writing: "Light comedy-thriller has plenty of plot, but is a trifle dull considering the source is a radio serial."

Britmovie wrote: "Barely watchable by today's standards (and probably not much more tolerable at the time), it nevertheless remains of passing interest for its cast, which includes Michael Medwin, Sid James and Andrew Keir, all of them then in the early stages of what would prove to be lengthy and successful careers."
