= Pat McDonald (actress) =

Australian actress (1921–1990)

- Pat McDonald (right) with Bunney Brooke in Number 96
- Born: Patricia Ethell McDonald; 1 August 1921; Elwood, Victoria, Australia
- Died: 10 March 1990 (aged 68); Sydney, New South Wales, Australia
- Occupation: Actor
- Years active: 1928–1938 (amateur); 1939–1989 (professional)
- Known for: Number 96; Sons and Daughters
- Partner: Bunney Brooke
- Awards: Gold Logie + 3 Logie awards

Patricia Ethel McDonald (1 August 1921 – 10 March 1990) known professionally as Miss Patricia McDonald, and subsequently as Pat McDonald was an Australian Gold Logie-winning actress of radio, stage and screen, primarily in small screen, her performance career spanned some 60 years in the industry.

McDonald was active in the industry as a child since 1928, and worked early in her career in England. having appeared in a few early Australian films, and featured in numerous theatre roles for many years. In her latter years she appeared primarily in radio and TV in soap operas and became best known locally for her role in serial Number 96 as the malapropism-speaking stickybeak, pensioner Dorrie Evans, appearing opposite co-star vaudevillian and early star Ron Shand as her hen-pecked husband Herb. 'Dorrie and Herb' were essentially comic characters.

McDonald post-96 found prominence with the TV soap opera Sons and Daughters as former madam Aunty Fiona Thompson, whom she based on Auntie Mame.

== Early life ==
McDonald was born on 1 August 1921 in Elwood, Victoria, Australia and was the daughter of a wealthy Sydney family. Her father, Arthur Stephen McDonald, was an electric radio engineer and public servant, and her mother was milliner Edith Roseina Ethell. Her grandfather, bootmaker John McDonald, was born in Victoria, and married Eliza Mary Stevenson.

McDonald trod the boards in an amateur capacity at an early age, and was a child performer on stage from the age of 7; singing, dancing, modelling and playing piano.

== Early professional career ==
McDonald started her professional career in 1939, having just turned 18, like many performers of the era, she set sail for England to appear in film parts, but with the outbreak of the Second World War, she soon travelled back to Australia

Prominent in theatre, radio and screen, at the age of eighteen she appeared in the 1939 Australian film Seven Little Australians based on the novel by children's literary author Ethel Turner and the war film Wings of Destiny. In 1940, she moved to theatre roles. She also did modelling and catwalk appearances.

Her roles in theatre started to become prominent in the 1940s with productions like '"The Housemaster", even though she would later primarily concentrate on radio and then television, she remained active in the theatre genre her entire life including a stage version of Steel Magnolias.

== TV series: Number 96 and Sons and Daughters ==
McDonald was best known for two long-running soap opera roles. She was cast by David Sale as comical malaproping gossip Dorrie Evans in the popular serial Number 96 in 1972, after she had previously appeared in a similar production written by Sale. McDonald was only aged in her early fifties when she started in the role, and he had envisioned the character of "Dorrie" to be played by a much older lady; however, she stated she fitted the role perfectly, and she reprised the role for the feature film version.

She subsequently played Aunty Fiona Thompson in Sons and Daughters between 1981 and 1987. She was featured in both shows throughout their entire run, about five-and-a-half years in each case.

== Awards ==
McDonald won four Logie awards, including the 1974 Gold Logie, for her work on Number 96. as Australia's most popular female television personality in 1974.

== Later appearances and roles ==
McDonald featured in a regular role in the short-lived situation comedy "The Tea Ladies"

One of McDonald's final TV appearances was at the Logie Awards on 17 March 1989, when she took part in a production number called "Golden Girls", which celebrated female Gold Logie winners of years past. She performed the song with Lorrae Desmond, Hazel Phillips, Jeanne Little, Denise Drysdale and her Sons and Daughters co-star Rowena Wallace. Later in 1989 McDonald appeared in an episode of the hit British TV series In Sickness and in Health in which she played Raeline's mother. The episode aired in the UK in October 1989.

== Personal life ==
McDonald was married in 1941 to Captain Peter Ian Alexander Hendry, a doctor in the Australian Army who then was taken prisoner of war and interred at Changi.

She had a daughter in 1941, Rosemary Patricia.

During the 1970s she was involved in a live-in relationship with Number 96 co-star Bunney Brooke. The two actors openly appeared in magazine articles about the suburban Sydney home (eastern end of Fox Valley Road, Wahroonga) they shared, and they freely discussed their international summer holidays together in press articles, although the true nature of the relationship was not explicitly stated.

McDonald died of cancer of the pancreas after a lengthy illness at Royal North Shore Hospital, Sydney, on 10 March 1990, aged 68. Her partner, actor and casting agent Bunney Brooke, died ten years later.

== Awards ==
Institution	Award	Work
Logie Awards	Gold Logie	Number 96
Logie Awards	Silver Logie for Most Popular Actress × 3	Number 96

== Filmography ==
=== Movies ===
Year	Film	Role	Notes
1974	Number 96	Dorrie Evans	Feature film based on TV series
1940	Wings of Destiny (billed as Patricia McDonald)	Marion Jamieson	
1939	Seven Little Australians	Esther	

=== Television ===
Year	Title	Episode	Role	Notes
2008	Not Quite Hollywood: The Wild, Untold Story of Ozploitation!		As self	Feature film documentary (Archive Footage)
1989	In Sickness and in Health	#4.7	Railene's Mother	TV series, 1 episode
1989	The 29th Annual TV Week Logie Awards		Herself with Rowena Wallace, Denise Drysdale, Lorrae Desmond, Hazel Phillips & Jeanne Little sing "Golden Girls"	TV special
1988	TV A.M.		Herself	TV series UK, 1 episode
1986	Kids 21st Birthday Channel Ten Telethon	Guest – Herself with Number 96 cast: Johnny Lockwood, Bettina Welch, Elizabeth Kirkby, Vicki Raymond, Sheila Kennelly, Wendy Blacklock, Harry Michaels, Chard Hayward, Frances Hargreaves & Abigail taped appearance.	TV special	
1984	The 1984 Annual TV Week Logie Awards	Herself – Audience member	TV Special	
1982	The Mike Walsh Show	Herself with Joe Hasham, Ron Shand & Chard Hayward	TV series, 1 episode	
1982–1987	Channel 7 Perth Telethon		Herself	TV special
1983	The Body Corporate		Lady Tustrain	TV movie
1982–1987	Sons and Daughters	Regular cast	Fiona Thompson	TV series
1981	A Country Practice	Alternatives (Parts 1 & 2)	Lily Bauer	TV series, 2 episodes
1980	The Mike Walsh Show	Guest – Herself	TV series, 1 episode	
1978	Glenview High	The Siren	Guest role	TV series, 1 episode
1979	The Mike Walsh Show	Guest – Herself with Maggie Kirkpatrick	TV series, 1 episode	
1978	The Tea Ladies		Regular role	TV series
1978	The Mike Walsh Show	Guest – Herself	TV series, 1 episode	
1977	Number 96: The Final Episode		Herself with Ron Shand & Bunney Brooke	TV special
1977	Telethon '77	Guest – Herself	TV special	
1976	Number 96: And They Said It Wouldn’t Last		Herself with Bunney Brooke & Ron Shand	TV special
1973	Sunday Magazine	Herself – Guest (Number 96 Celebration: 300th episode) with Abigail, Ron Shand, Gordon McDougall & Johnny Lockwood	TV series, 1 episode	
1972–1977	Number 96	Regular cast	Dorrie Evans	TV series
1971	Dynasty	The Coorabungle Deposit	Guest role: Selma	ABC TV Series, 1 episode
1971	Homicide	The Terrible Stranger	Guest role: Mrs. Davis	TV series, 1 episode
1970	Division 4	Running Sheet	Guest role: Betty Gregson	TV series, 2 episodes
1970	Division 4	Man From Lightning Ridge	Ruby Slater	TV series
1970	The Long Arm	Only a Wave Away	Guest role: Miss Bacon	TV series, 1 episode 18: "Only A Wave Away"

== Theatre productions ==
Theatre credits are referenced by AusStage

Name of production	Year	Role (where known)	Playwright	Presenting company	Theatre	Genre	Worldwide premiere/country of origin	Number of productions	Event identifier
Quiet Wedding	1940		Esther McCracken	David N. Martin Pty. Ltd.	Minerva Theatre, Sydney	Comedy – Spoken Word (3 part)	No/British production (debut 1938)		14370
Love on the Dole	1940		Ronald Gow based on novel by Walter Greenwood	David N. Martin Productions	Minerva Theatre, Sydney	Drama – spoken word	No		15263
Tony Draws a Horse	1940		Lesley Storm	David N. Martin Productions	Minerva Theatre, Sydney	Comedy – spoken word theatre	No/British (premiere at the Criterion Theatre, London 1939)		14634
Housemaster	1941		Ian Hay	David N. Martin Pty Ltd uin association with Minerva Productions	Minerva Theatre, Sydney	Theatre spoken word Comedy-Drama-	No/British (debut the Apollo Theatre, London 1936		15266
Of Mice and Men	1940		John Steinbeck	David N Martin Pty Ltd.	Minerva Theatre, Sydney	Drama theatre spoken word	No		14347
Banana Ridge	1940		Ben Travers	J.C Williamson Theatres	Theatre Royal, Sydney	Comedy/Farce	No		16746
Boy Meets Girl	1944		Samuel Spewack	Whitehall Productions	Minerva Theatre, Sydney	theatre – spoken world	No		12154
Pygmalion	1944		George Bernard Shaw	Whitehall Productions	Minerva Theatre, Sydney	Romantic/Drama – traditional theatre spoken word	No		14368
Three's a Family	1944		Henry Ephron	Whitehall Productions	Minerva Theatre, Sydney	Family comedy	No		14611
While the Sun Shines	1944		Terence Rattigan	Whitehall Productions Pty Ltd.	Minerva Theatre	Theatre Spoken Word/Comedy	No		14701
A Soldier for Christmas	1945		Reginald Beckwith	Whitehall Productions Pty Ltd.	Minerva Theatre	Theatre Spoken Word/Comedy	No		14425
Let 'er Go and While the Sun Shines	1945		Terence Rattigan	Various	Tivoli Theatre, Melbourne	Comedy//Vaudeville /Theatre spoke word	No		123233
Get a Load of This	1945			Various	Tivoli Theatre	Music theatre Revue/Vaudeville	No		123234
Soldiers Wife	1945		Ross Franken	Whitehall Productions Pty. Ltd.	Minerva Theatre	Theatre Spoken Word/Comedy	No		14491
