= The Kellys of Tobruk =

- Directed by: Rupert Kathner
- Produced by: Rupert Kathner; Alma Brooks
- Starring: Syd Beck; Ossie Wenban
- Production company: Fanfare Films
- Release date: 1942 (intended)
- Country: Australia
- Language: English

The Kellys of Tobruk was a comedy feature film planned by Rupert Kathner with an intended release in late 1942. Advertisements were placed in newspapers in January 1942 calling for supporting players. The film was abandoned after Kathner's company, Fanfare, was taken over by Supreme Sound System.

Kathner and his partner Alma Brooks were later charged with conspiracy to defraud by investors in Fanfare Films, but were acquitted.
