= The Pyjama Girl Murder Case =

- Directed by: Rupert Kathner
- Production company: Enterprise Films
- Release dates: August 1939; 1944 (re-release)
- Running time: 10 mins
- Country: Australia
- Language: English

The Pyjama Girl Murder Case is a dramatised 1939 newsreel from director Rupert Kathner based on the murder of Linda Agostini.

It was an installment of the Australia Today newsreel series.
