= The Pyjama Girl murder =

English Australian homicide victim

Killing of "The Pyjama Girl"
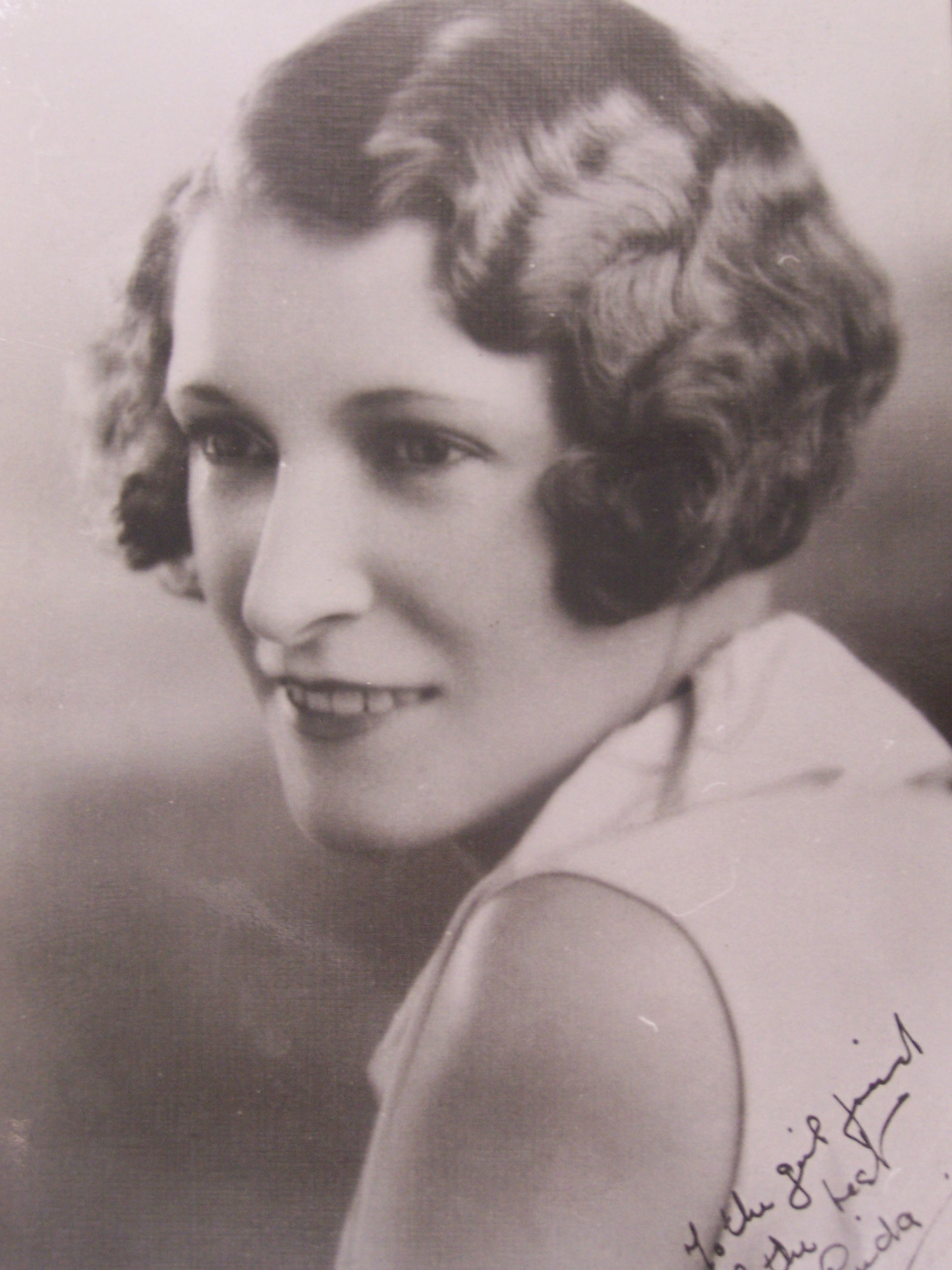
- Linda Agostini, identified by police as the Pyjama Girl though this is widely disputed
- Date: 27 August 1934; 92 years ago
- Location: Carlton, Melbourne, Australia
- Also known as: Pyjama Girl
- Type: Homicide by beating, shooting, manslaughter, uxoricide
- Deaths: Florence Linda Agostini, aged 28 (identity disputed)
- Convicted: Tony Agostini
- Charges: Murder; Manslaughter
- Verdict: Not guilty of murder; Guilty of manslaughter
- Sentence: 6 years in prison (paroled after 3 years and 1 month)

On 1 September 1934, the badly burned body of a woman with a bullet through the neck was found in a culvert running under Howlong Road in Albury, New South Wales, Australia. The woman became known as the Pyjama Girl.

The body remained unidentified for a decade until an Italian-Australian man, Tony Agostini, confessed to killing his wife, Florence Linda Agostini, who had been missing since late August 1934. Police said they had matched the dental records from the body with Linda Agostini's, though she had been ruled out as the victim in the initial investigation. Tony Agostini was arrested and charged with murder. He was then brought to trial and convicted of the lesser offence of manslaughter, and was sentenced to 6 years in prison. He was paroled after 3 years and 1 month and was deported to Italy.

In 2013, historian Richard Evans published a book that concluded police decided to identify Agostini in order to close the case to avoid embarrassment, and that the body could not have actually been hers. Among many other discrepancies, their eye colours did not match. This means the body buried as "Linda Agostini" is in fact an entirely different person - the Pyjama Girl - who remains unidentified.

== Life of Agostini ==
Florence Linda Agostini (née Platt; 12 September 1905 – 27 August 1934) was an English Australian manslaughter victim found on a stretch of road in Albury, New South Wales, Australia, in September 1934.

Linda Agostini was born Florence Linda Platt in Forest Hill, a suburb of South East London, on 12 September 1905. As a teenager, Platt worked at a confectionery shop in Surrey before travelling to New Zealand at the age of 19 after what was rumoured to be a broken romance. Platt remained in New Zealand until 1927 when she moved to Australia to live in Sydney. There she worked at a cinema in the city and lived in a boarding house on Darlinghurst Road in Kings Cross, where accounts tell she entertained young, attractive men. Platt was a heavy drinker and a Jazz Age party-goer who had difficulty adjusting to stability. Her marriage to Italian-born Antonio Agostini (1903–1969), in a Sydney registry office during 1930, was the beginning of an unhappy time that would see the couple leave for Melbourne to remove her from the influence of her Sydney friends.

== Discovery and initial investigation ==
Agostini disappeared from friends and family in late August 1934, around a week before the unidentified Pyjama Girl was found in Splitter's Creek, near Albury, on the New South Wales side of the border with Victoria.

The victim's body was discovered by a local man named Thomas Griffiths. Griffiths had been leading a prize bull along the side of Howlong Road near Albury when he saw the body in a culvert running under the road and noticed a strong smell of kerosene. Slightly concealed by a hessian grain sack and badly burned, the body would not have been visible to anybody driving by. The culvert was visible by at least five houses.

The victim's head was wrapped in a towel. She had been badly beaten and an x-ray revealed a bullet in her neck. In a detail that came to define the case, she was wearing yellow silk pyjamas with a Chinese dragon motif – in Depression-era Australia, such clothing was luxurious, youthful and bohemian.

It soon became apparent that the body was of a petite woman in her twenties, but her identity could not be established. After the initial investigation failed to identify her, the body was taken to Sydney where it was put on public exhibition. She was preserved in a zinc-lined bath of formalin for this purpose at the Sydney University Medical School.

== Coronial inquest ==
In January 1938, a relieving magistrate in Albury, Mr. C.W Swiney opened a coronial inquest into the woman's murder. Present at the inquest was the man who had found the woman, Thomas Griffiths. Detective Sergeant McCrae, one of the investigators responsible for the case, said that even though police had made extensive inquiries, ‘They were unable to place any information before the inquiry about the exact time or place she met her death'. McCrae went on to say that it is his opinion that the body had been placed in the bag before rigor mortis set in and, judging from the position in which the body was found, he was convinced that the dead woman had been carried some distance in a motor vehicle before the body was placed in the culvert. The injuries to the head were caused in his opinion by a heavy and possibly a blunt instrument, such as a tyre lever.

The inquest also revealed more information about the potato-type sack, her pyjamas, and the towel that was wrapped around her head. Detective McRae noted that infrared technology revealed the letters DALM, and the burnt portion of the sack contained the letters ORE. This, he believed, refers to the Dalmore district in Gippsland, Victoria, and was not an uncommon sack at the time.

The woman's pyjamas were green and cream in colour, but infrared technology didn't reveal anything of note. The towel, of Japanese origin, was most likely imported to Sydney and Melbourne in 1933. The Laundry Owners' Associations of both Victoria and NSW were contacted, but the initials RCO or RMO had no association.

== Secret police file ==
On 19 January 1941, The Daily Telegraph newspaper published an article claiming reporters had obtained a 'secret police file'. In the file, a Mrs J Rutledge asserted the body of the then unidentified woman was her daughter, Anna Philomena Morgan. Detectives, whose reports are summarised in the file, were impressed by the resemblance between Philomena Rutledge and the Pyjama Girl, but they did not believe they were identical. They point out that, before making her present claim, Mrs. Rutledge had twice denied that the Pyjama Girl was her daughter.

The police file also revealed that Philomena's grandmother, a woman by the name of Mrs Jones, reported that her granddaughter was missing back on 1 December 1934, just a few months after the body had been found. The following day, Philomena's mother provided a description of her daughter to police.

The secret file also revealed that Mrs. Rutledge viewed the body of the Pyjama Girl in 1937. Police hold a statement signed by her which said: "That body is to no way identical with my daughter Philomena. The teeth are altogether different. That is the first thing I looked for. My daughter's hair was very dark brown, and in no way identical with that of the unknown woman,".

== Body moved ==
In 1942, her body was transferred to police headquarters where it remained until 1944. Several names were suggested for the identity of the dead woman, among them Anna Philomena Morgan and Linda Agostini. Both women were missing, both bore a likeness to the Pyjama Girl and both were of the right age. However, New South Wales police satisfied themselves that neither of the missing women was the Pyjama Girl and she remained unidentified.

== Arrest and conviction of Tony Agostini ==
In 1944, ten years after the body had been discovered, the forensic evidence was re-examined and the dental analysis of the victim was matched to Agostini.

Tony Agostini had recently returned to Sydney after being held in internment camps at Orange, Hay and Loveday from 1940 to 1944 due to his nationalist sympathies. The police commissioner, William MacKay, who had known him before the war when he worked as a waiter at the restaurant that MacKay frequented, interviewed him. Noticing that he seemed to be in a nervous state, MacKay asked him what had come over him. Antonio Agostini then confessed to killing his wife.

In his statement, he admitted that he had accidentally shot and killed his wife when they were living in Melbourne. Worried that he might be accused of murder, he had driven the body over the state border to Albury and had dumped it in the culvert. He had poured petrol over the body and set fire to it, to destroy the evidence.

The arrest of Agostini was a sensation, as it meant that the Pyjama Girl had been identified. He was charged with murder and was extradited to Melbourne, where he was tried for murder. He was acquitted but was found guilty of manslaughter instead, and was sentenced to six years' imprisonment but only served 3 years and 1 month. He was released in 1948 and deported to Italy, where he died in 1969.

== Doubts about the body's identity ==
The case might have been left there, but some cast doubt on its conclusion. In his 2004 book, The Pyjama Girl Mystery: A True Story of Murder, Obsession and Lies, historian Richard Evans pointed out discrepancies with the evidence, calling Antonio Agostini's conviction the result of "police corruption and a miscarriage of justice". The Pyjama Girl had brown eyes; Agostini's were blue. The victim had a different bust size to Agostini and she had a different shaped nose. Evans also points out that 125 women were originally on the police's list of possible identities, but that these other leads remained "uneliminated and untraced".

Evans also suggests that Agostini was murdered around the same time as the Albury victim, and most likely in the confines of the couple's Melbourne townhouse, but that she was not the Pyjama Girl.

== Adaptations ==
The case was turned into a short film, The Pyjama Girl Murder Case in 1939 by director Rupert Kathner.

A film entitled La ragazza dal pigiama giallo (The Pyjama Girl Case), directed by Italian Flavio Mogherini, was produced in 1977. A book written by Hugh Geddes, based on the film and bearing the same title, appeared in 1978.

In issue #35 of Eddie Campbell's serial comic "Bacchus" this case is featured in a sequence titled The Pyjama Girl.

A short film by Canberra film maker Huck Tyrrell, entitled Roadside, was produced in 1998 and inspired by the murder. In the film the victim returns as a hitch-hiker who tells her story to the unsuspecting driver and eventually leads him to her remains.

In 2013, the Hothouse Theatre in Albury/Wodonga commissioned and performed a play entitled The Pyjama Girl from Canberra playwright Emma Gibson.

== See also ==
- List of solved missing person cases (pre-1950)
