= No Strangers Here =

- Produced by: Doc Sternberg
- Starring: John Fernside
- Production companies: National Film Board; Department of Immigration
- Release date: December 1950
- Running time: 50 mins
- Country: Australia
- Language: English

No Strangers Here is a 1950 Australian dramatised documentary about a migrant family who move to Australia. Four actors play the migrants.

According to the Sun Herald:

Apart from acknowledgment of its good intentions, not very much can be said on behalf of this locally made narrative about a family of New Australians and their life in a country town. The script is deplorably slow in movement. The way is still wide open for a good Australian film- maker to search into the absorbing drama of human conflicts and hopes and doubts that is locked in the heart of every New Australian.
