= Argosy Films =

Australian film production company

Argosy Films was an Australian production company, best known for the feature films That Certain Something (1941) and The Power and the Glory (1941). It was formed by people formerly involved with National Productions.

== About ==
The company was registered in 1937 with capital of £50,000. The subscribers were Frederick Daniel, George B. Bennett, Ronald H. Wolff, Cecil V. Stevenson, Noel Monkman, Harold L. Gray, and Joseph A. Byron. The general manager was Frederick Daniell.

In 1940 it was announced they would make two feature films, with 60% of the cost to be guaranteed by the New South Wales government. The two films were to be Daughters of Australia, budgeted at £12,500, and Man Without a Country, at a cost of £12,500 (these were later re-titled That Certain Something (1941) and The Power and the Glory (1941) respectively).

Plans for further production – including a version of the Stingaree stories – did not come to fruition and the company was liquidated in 1948.

Argosy is not to be confused with the British film company of the same name.
