= Kendal Flanagan =

Australian film and television director

Kendal Flanagan (died 27 November 1999) was an Australian film and television director primarily of the 1980s. He was the principal director of the popular Australian TV series Prisoner which went on to achieve cult status in the UK. Other credits include directing episodes of The Young Doctors, Richmond Hill and Australia's longest-running television drama serial, Neighbours.

He was also the director of the ill-fated 1989 Australian slasher film Houseboat Horror.
