= Black Majesty =

Australian power metal band

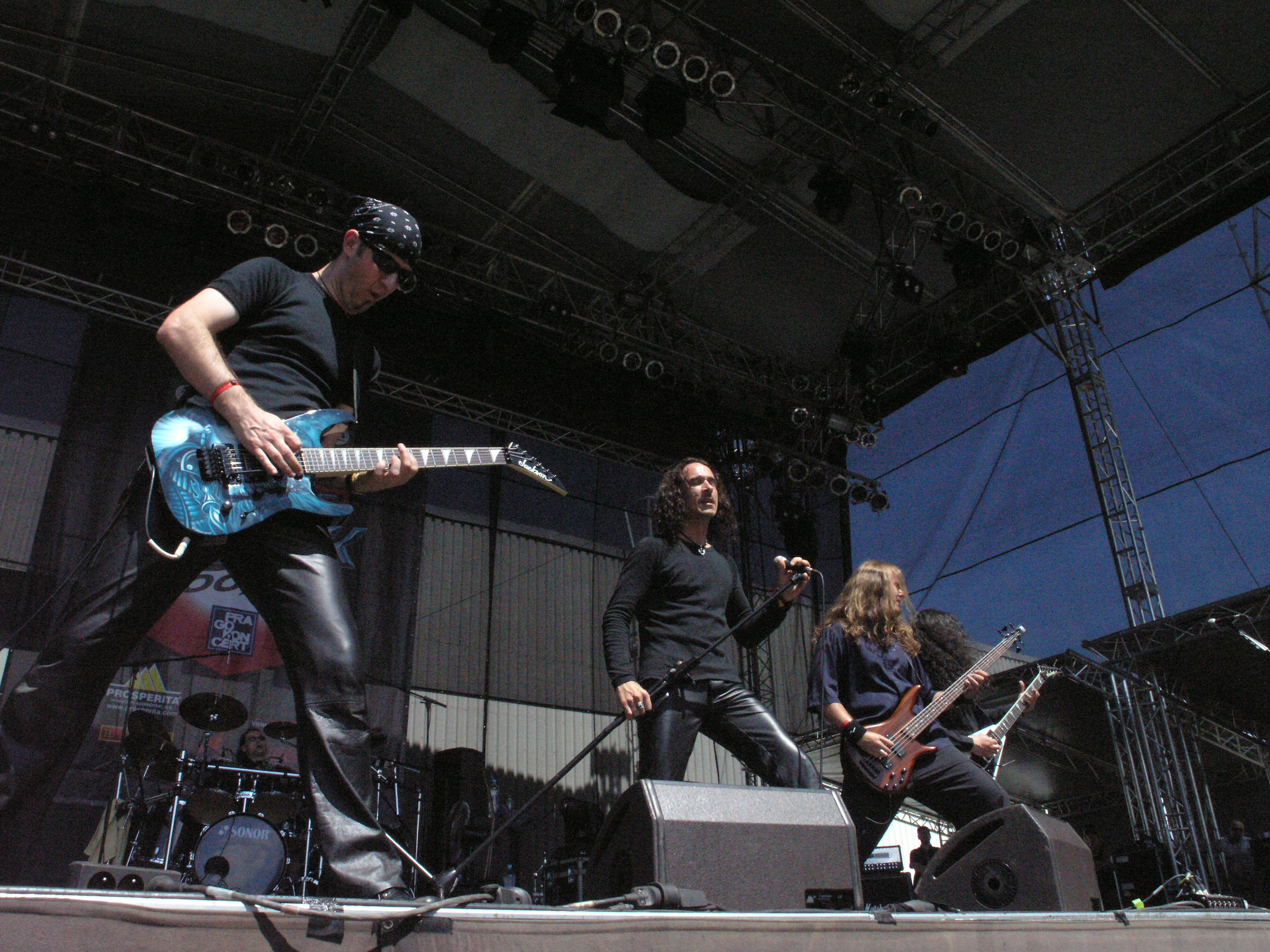
- Black Majesty performing in concert at the Masters of Rock 2007 festival

Background information
- Also known as: Kymera (2001–2002); Arkaya (2002)
- Origin: Melbourne, Victoria, Australia
- Genres: Power metal, heavy metal
- Years active: 2001–present
- Label: Limb Music
- Members: John 'Gio' Cavaliere; Clinton Bidie; Hanny Mohamed; Evan Harris; Ben Wignall
- Past members: Joe Fata; Mark Kelson; Cory Betts; Steve Janevski
- Website: blackmajesty.com

Black Majesty are an Australian power metal band formed in 2001 as Kymera. The band was founded by guitarist Steve Janevski (ex-Cyclone Tracy) and bassist Cory Betts (ex-Pegazus). After the release of a three track sampler album, they signed a five-album contract with German-based label, LMP Records. The group released their latest studio album, Oceans Of Black, in June 20 2025.

== History ==
=== Early: Kymera ===
The band was formed in Melbourne in 2001 under the name Kymera. Guitarist Steve Janevski was drawn from Cyclone Tracy, a long-running heavy rock/hair metal outfit. Bassist Cory Betts was a member of Pegazus, a Melbourne power metal band that had toured Europe in 1998, although he did not join that band until early 1999. Kymera's other guitarist Hanny Mohammed had recorded an album with a band called Catwitch who had been featured on a television documentary. The band dropped the Kymera moniker due to an American band sharing the same name. After considering the name Arkaya, the band began recording material. Betts left and the group renamed to Black Majesty.

=== Black Majesty ===
The Sands of Time album was recorded in 2002 and prefaced by a three-track promo disc that gained them a five-album contract with German label LMP. The album's sound was a mixture of progressive metal and power metal drawing influence from Queensrÿche and Jag Panzer. Reviews of the album were positive, and in several online polls it won "Album of the Year" honors. Bass tracks were recorded by both Betts and Evan Harris, and Cavaliere duetted with Silvio Massaro from Vanishing Point and cousin Danny Cecati from Eyefear on two tracks. Joe Fata replaced Betts in the interim but left before the album was released in 2003 and since then Black Majesty has not had a permanent bass player, instead looking towards local bass players. During this time period guitarist Hanny Mohammed played bass at infrequent live shows with fellow Australian power metal band Pegazus, although by the end of 2002 Mohammed focused on Black Majesty.

Bassists Mark Kelson of Melbourne doom band The Eternal and Harris have featured as touring members, Harris contributing to the band's next release also, 2005's Silent Company. The album's sound changed from Sands of Time, the band dropping their small progressive touches and going for a more straightforward melodic sound. For the recording of "Silent Company" Pavel Konvalinka recorded his drum tracks in Germany with Piet Sielck of Iron Savior whilst the remainder of the band recorded their tracks at Palm Studios in Melbourne with producer Endel Rivers. The album's release was preceded by a short tour of Europe, where the band gained exposure to their primary market by playing solo shows and gaining spots on festivals featuring bands such as HammerFall and Edguy. On the band's return to Australia they launched the album with additional solo dates before touring with British band DragonForce and American metal group Nevermore. The band began writing songs for their next album while performing sporadic live shows, focusing on the writing and recording of their third studio effort.

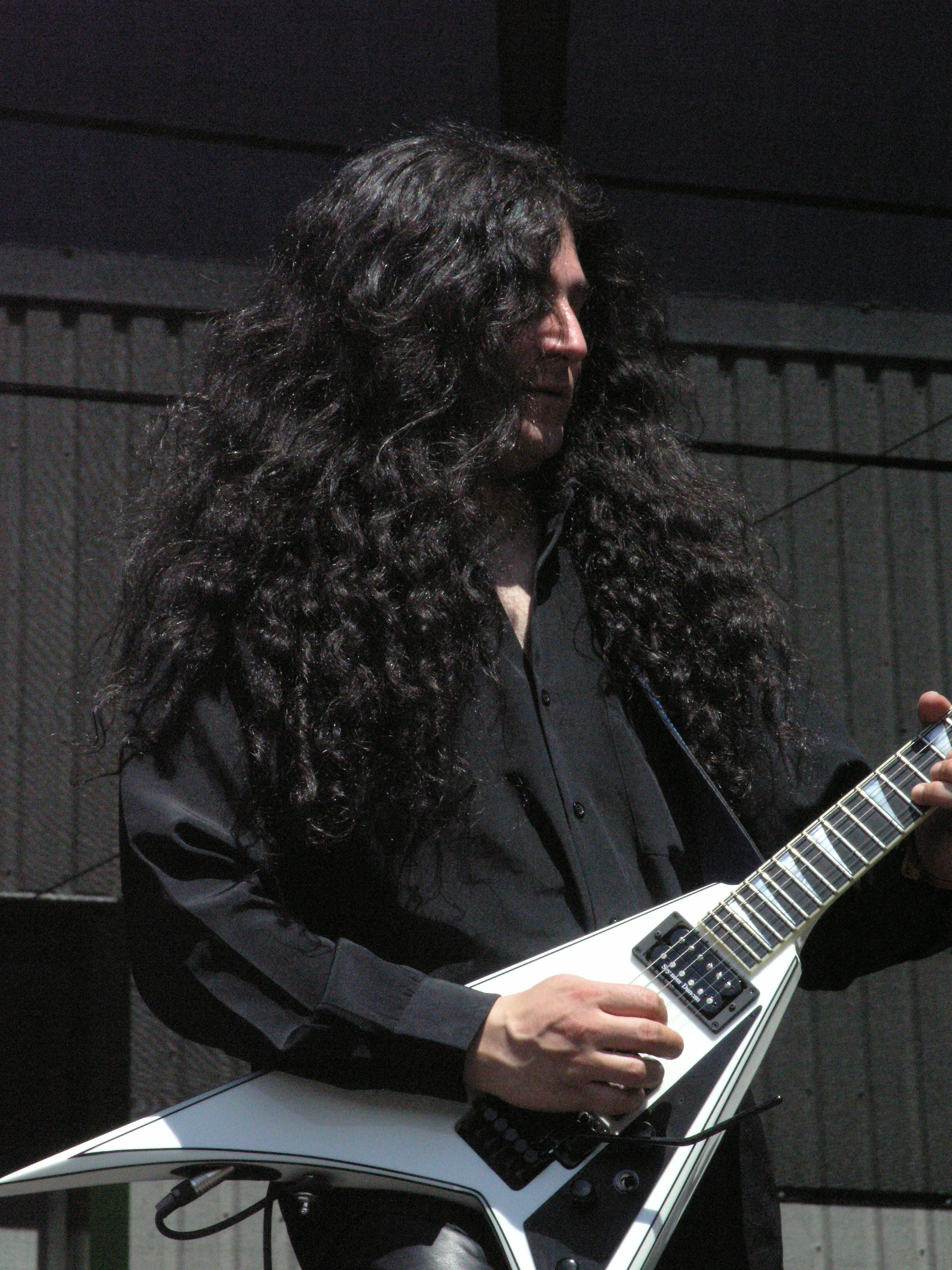
Hanny Mohamed at Masters of Rock 2007.

Black Majesty's third album Tomorrowland was released on 1 June 2007. The album was launched by another European tour which featured slots at festivals such as Masters of Rock, Benatska Noc, and Europe's biggest heavy metal festival, Wacken Open Air, along with a few solo club dates. Bass duties were filled by Richard Filak. Upon Black Majesty's return to Australia, they launched Tomorrowland with various shows around Melbourne. In the following months Black Majesty continued to display their prominence on the Australian Power Metal scene playing solo shows along with supporting Helloween in February. They supported Saxon on their April tour of Australia.

Black Majesty started work on its fourth album in February 2009 for Limb Music Products. The group supported former Iron Maiden singer Paul Dianno on two of his Australian shows on 30 May at the Hifi Bar & Ballroom in Melbourne, and on 6 June at the Manning Bar in Sydney. In November that year they appeared at Screamfest in Sydney. Black Majesty will play a one-off concert in Jakarta, Indonesia as part of the Jak Sound, Jakarta Sound & Music Expo on 6 February 2010. Black Majesty released their fourth album, In Your Honour, in 2010 which was mixed by Roland Grapow. The release was promoted with several shows around Australia as well as a headlining slot at Indonesia's Bla Bla Bla Festival. The band announced a European tour to support the album's release.

In mid-2019, Janevski left the band and was replaced by Clinton Bidie. He has since gone on to form the popular hard rock band Wicked Smile with Cecati. His daughter Cassidy Paris is also well-known as a musician herself. Wicked Smile and Cassidy Paris supported Black Majesty at their 25 August 2023 concert in the Melbourne suburb of Richmond.

== Discography ==
Sands of Time EP

- Released: 2002
- Format: CD
- Label: Independent

Sands of Time

- Released: 2003
- Format: CD
- Label: LMP

Silent Company

- Released: 2005
- Format: CD
- Label: LMP

Tomorrowland

- Released: 2007
- Format: CD
- Label: LMP

In Your Honour

- Released: 2010
- Format: CD
- Label: Just Say Rock / LMP

Stargazer

- Released: 2012
- Format: CD
- Label: LMP

Cross of Thorns

- Released: 2015
- Format: CD
- Label: Pride & Joy

Children of the Abyss

- Released: 2018
- Format: CD
- Label: Pride & Joy

Oceans Of Black

- Released: 2025
- Format: CD
- Label: Scarlett Records
