= John Fernside =

Australian actor (?–1957)

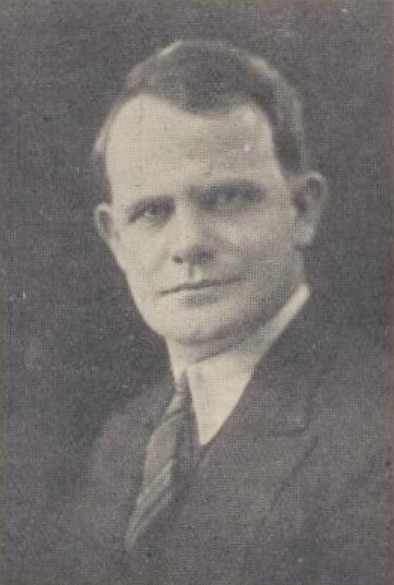
John Fernside

John Fernside (born 1892- 27 October 1957)) was an Australian actor who worked extensively on stage and screen from the 1910s through to 1950s. He co-starred with Chips Rafferty in three Australian films of the 1940s; The Overlanders (1946), Bush Christmas (1947) and Eureka Stockade (1949).

Fernside was born in Perth, Western Australia and worked his way up through the theatre.

He died on 27 October 1957, aged 65 in Darlinghurst, New South Wales.

== Select film credits ==
- Uncivilized (1936)
- Wings of Destiny (1940)
- The Power and the Glory (1941)
- The Overlanders (1946)
- Bush Christmas (1947)
- No Strangers Here (1950)
- The Glenrowan Affair (1951)
- Captain Thunderbolt (1953)
