= Arundel Nixon =

Australian-British actor

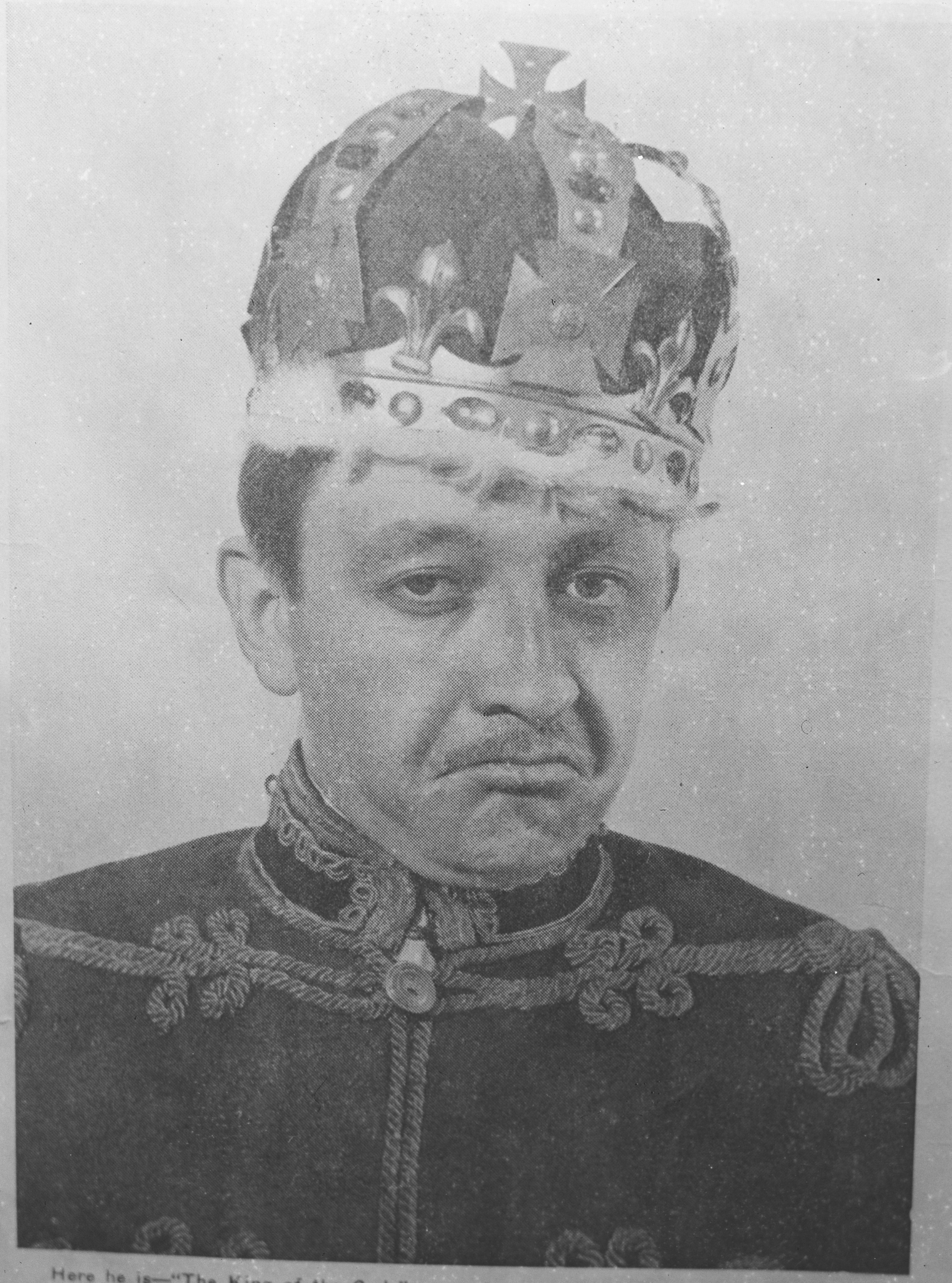
- Nixon in 1949
- Born: 1907
- Died: April 3, 1949 (aged 41–42)

Arundel Nixon (1907 – 3 April 1949) was an Australian-British actor best known for his long career in Australian radio as "king of the cads" (the title of one of his programs).

== Biography ==
Nixon was born in England and attended Sandhurst Military College. He ran away to start a theatre career.

Nixon moved to Australia in 1935 and established a strong, if controversial, reputation on radio. He became the most popular radio actor in Melbourne and moved to Sydney in 1939.

Nixon resigned from 2UE in 1943.

Nixon's personal life was often turbulent. He was married three times and his two children were sent to a home. He declared bankruptcy in 1945.

== Select credits ==
- Air Spy (1940) - radio
- That Certain Something (1941) - film
- Joan of Arc (1941) - radio
