= Thelma Grigg =

Australian actress (1911–2003)

- Thelma Grigg in The Lady Craved Excitement (1950)
- Born: Thelma Emerson; 13 September 1911; Sydney, New South Wales, Australia
- Died: 29 May 2003 (aged 91); Indianapolis, Indiana, US
- Occupation: Actress
- Years active: 1937–1950
- Spouses: George Robert Grigg (m. 1938) James Hugh Wharton (m. 1958)

Thelma Grigg (born Thelma Emerson, 13 September 1911 – 29 May 2003) was an Australian actress. She was first hired as an extra for Cinesound Productions in 1937. She made her stage debut in a 1939 production of The Women by Clare Boothe Luce at the Minerva Theatre, Sydney. She subsequently appeared in over 25 plays. Her first significant film role was in That Certain Something, directed by Clarence G. Badger in 1941. After playing the lead in the Minerva Theatre production of Ayn Rand's Night of January 16th in 1944, she moved to radio, starring in radio plays for the Australian Broadcasting Corporation. In 1947 she appeared in her last Australian film, the popular children's comedy Bush Christmas.

After Bush Christmas, Grigg moved to England in a largely unsuccessful effort to further her movie career. She landed minor roles in the 1949 films Christopher Columbus and Train of Events. In 1950 she returned to the stage with Robertson Hare in the West End production of Vernon Sylvaine's Will Any Gentleman...? That same year she appeared in her last known movie role, in the comedy The Lady Craved Excitement.

She subsequently married J. Hugh Wharton, an electrical engineer, and moved to Indianapolis, Indiana. She died there on 29 May 2003.

== Filmography ==
- That Certain Something (1941)
- Bush Christmas (1947)
- Christopher Columbus (1949)
- Train of Events (1949)
- The Lady Craved Excitement (1950)
