= Peter Pagan =

Australian actor

Peter MacGregor Pagan (24 July 1921 – 2 June 1999) was an Australian-American actor from Sydney best known for his role in The Overlanders (1946).

Following the success of that film, he left Australia for Britain, then moved to the U.S. where he worked extensively in theatre and TV.

He became a U.S. citizen in 1954. He died in New York City, age 77.

== Career ==
Pagan was born in Sydney, one of three sons. His family moved to Hay, where his father was the town surveyor. He boarded at Scots College, Bellevue Hill. His brother was Brigadier Sir John (Jock) Ernest Pagan, CMG MBE (1914–1986), federal president of the Liberal Party of Australia and NSW agent-general for New South Wales in London.

When 16 he joined an amateur group at Bryant's Playhouse, Forbes Street, Darlinghurst, and studied drama there for four years.

Pagan joined the AIF at 21, and served over three years with an armoured division in Western Australia and was discharged on medical grounds in 1945.

He was cast in The Overlanders. He went to London and then New York.

When he was 27, Pagan joined the Barter Theatre Company in Virginia.

He was awarded the Drama Critics' Award for best supporting actor in 1971 for his role in There's a Girl in My Soup opposite Van Johnson.

In the mid 1970s Pagan said, "I'm not interested in Broadway anymore - the critics are killing it." In the late '70s and '80s, Pagan divided his time between New York and Sydney.

== Select film and television credits ==
- The Overlanders (1946) – film
- Academy Theatre – episode "Drums of Oude" (1949)
- The Philco-Goodyear Television Playhouse – episode "The Lonely" (1949)
- The Web – episode "Wanted, Someone Innocent" (1951)
- Studio One in Hollywood (1951) – episode "Mr Mummery's Suspicion"
- Robert Montgomery Presents – episode "The Sheffield Story" (1952)
- Guiding Light (1952)
- The Legend of Josiah Blow (1952)
- Home Is the Sailor (1953)
- Robert Montgomery Presents – episode "Our Hearts Were Young and Gay" (1954)
- I Spy – episode "The Green Coat" (1955)
- Kraft Theatre – episode "A Night to Remember" (1956)
- Playwrights '56 – episode "Keyhole" (1956)
- 9½ Weeks (1986)

== Theatre credits ==
- Another Language, Criterion Theatre, North Sydney, NSW, 18 March 1939
- The Truth About Blayds, St James' Hall, Sydney, NSW, 3 May 1939
- The Family Dictator, Criterion Theatre, North Sydney, NSW, June–July 1939
- Spring Tide, Minerva Theatre, Kings Cross, NSW, 19 June 1941
- It's a Wise Child, Theatre Royal, Sydney, NSW, 1944
- Charley's Aunt, Victoria Theatre, Newcastle, NSW, 1946
- Dangerous Corner by J Priestley - Virginia (1950)
- Escapade by Roger MacDougall - 48th Street Theatre New York - with Carroll Baker, Brian Aherne and Roddy McDowall - (18 Nov 1953 – 28 Nov 1953)
- Portrait of a Lady by William Archibald directed by Jose Quintero - ANTA Playhouse New York - with Jennifer Jones- 21 Dec 1954 – 25 Dec 1954
- Child of Fortune by Guy Bolton based on Wings of a Dove - directed by Jed Harris with Edmond Purdom - Royale Theatre, New York - (13 Nov 1956 – 1 Dec 1956)
- 13 Daughters - musical with Don Ameche - 54th Street Theatre, New York (2 Mar 1961 – 25 Mar 1961)
- The Vinegar Tree - Cape Playhouse in Dennis, Massachusetts with Faye Emerson (1962)
- The Girl Who Came to Supper by Noël Coward - Broadway Theatre, New York - with Florence Henderson and Jose Ferrer - (8 Dec 1963 – 14 Mar 1964_
- Hostile Witness by Jack Roffey - Music Box Theatre, New York - with Ray Milland - (17 Feb 1966 – 2 Jul 1966
- Boeing Boeing at the Cape Playhouse in Dennis, Massachusetts with Van Johnson (1970)
- You Never Can Tell by George Bernard Shaw - Philadelphia (1980)
- Aren't We All? by Fredrick Lonsdale - Brooks Atkinson Theatre, New York - with Claudette Colbert, Rex Harrison and Lynn Redgrave - (29 Apr 1985 – 21 Jul 1985)
