= The Glenrowan Affair =

1951 film

- Directed by: Rupert Kathner
- Written by: Rupert Kathner
- Produced by: Rupert Kathner
- Starring: Bob Chitty; Albie Henderson
- Narrated by: Charles Tingwell
- Cinematography: Rupert Kathner; Harry Malcolm
- Edited by: Alex Ezard
- Production company: Australian Action Pictures
- Distributed by: British Empire Films
- Release date: 17 August 1951
- Running time: 70 minutes
- Country: Australia
- Language: English

The Glenrowan Affair is a 1951 film about Ned Kelly from director Rupert Kathner. It was Kathner's final film and stars VFL star Bob Chitty as Kelly. At the time of its release it was nominated as one of the worst films ever made in Australia.

== Plot ==
An unnamed artist (Rupert Kathner) is sketching in Kelly country, near Benalla. He meets a bushman known as "Old Dinny," who, the film infers, is Dan Kelly, having survived the shootout at Glenrowan. The film flashes back to the story of the Kelly gang.

== Cast ==
- Bob Chitty as Ned Kelly
- Albie Henderson as Joe Byrne
- Ben Crowe as Dan Kelly
- Bill Wright as Steve Hart
- John Fernside as Father Gibney
- Charles Tasman as Commissioner Nicholson (Note: In reality Nicholson was a superintendent during the Kelly Outbreak. The position of commissioner was actually held by Standish.)
- Charles Webb as Superintendent Hare
- Edward Smith as Superintendent Standish
- Frank Ransome as Sergeant Steele
- Stan Tolhurst as the blacksmith
- "Beatrice Kay" (Alma Brooks) as Kate Kelly
- Wendy Roberts as Mrs Skillion
- "Hunt Angels" (Rupert Kathner) as Aaron Sherritt
- Dore Norris as Mrs Jones
- Joe Brennan as the bank manager
- Arthur Helmsley as the old man
- Bud Tingwell as Narrator

== A Message to Kelly ==
In August 1947 Harry Southwell arrived in Benalla, Victoria, to make a film about the Ned Kelly story, A Message to Kelly. It was based on a script by Melbourne journalist Keith Manzie, with Rupert Kathner as assistant director. Kathner was in the area trying to raise funds for a film about Adam Lindsay Gordon.

Southwell and Kathner formed a company, Benalla Film Productions, and raised finance for the film. Football star Bob Chitty, who was coaching in the region, was cast as Ned Kelly. Mervyn Murphy assisted with sound recording equipment. Despite vocal opposition from descendants of the Kellys, filming began in September 1947.

In October, Southwell left the project and Kathner took over. In November Benalla announced they wanted a director to replace Kathner.

== The Glenrowan Affair ==
Kathner returned in December 1947 with finance from a new company, Australian Action Pictures, intending to make his own Ned Kelly film, based on his own script. Australian Action Pictures was formed with capital of £25,000. For a time it seemed two rival Kelly films would be made in the area. Advertisements were printed clarifying they would be made by different people.

Eventually Benalla Film Productions ceased production on their Ned Kelly movie and Kathner made his. He used Bob Chitty to play the lead but recast all the other roles, including Carlton footballer Ben Crone.

Filming began January 1948. Exteriors were shot in and around Benalla. Studio scenes were filmed in the new studio of Commonwealth Film Laboratories in Sydney in January 1950.

== Reception ==
Reviews were poor and distribution limited. The critic for the Sun Herald stated that:

This near-unendurable stretch of laboured, amateurish film-making is something that the developing Australian film industry will wish to forget-swiftly and finally... A film made on a shoe-string (as this obviously was) could still achieve a little crude vitality. This one isn't even robust enough for the unconscious humour (and there is plenty of that) to be really enjoyable. The script is dreary, the photography more often out of-focus than in, the editing is unimaginative and the acting petrified. It would be misplaced kindness, in fact, to try and ferret out a redeeming feature.

The film was given its first screening in Victoria at Benalla. Townspeople were worried relatives of the Kellys would cause trouble. However, the screening was accompanied by audience laughter. Nonetheless the screening raised £400 for charity.

Australian film critic Michael Adams later included The Glenrowan Affair on his list of the worst ever Australian films, along with Kathner's Phantom Gold.

Filmink argued "The photography is nice as are the locations; The Glenrowan Affair is not a very good film, but you can enjoy it in the right spirit, with all those fake beards, ham acting and out of focus photography."
