= Rupert Kathner =

Australian film director

Rupert William Kaethner (1904–1954) was an Australian film director best known for newsreels and low-budget films. He worked with Alma Brooks who co-produced, operated the camera, edited, co-scripted and acted in their films. One journalist has described Kathner and Brooks as "shady con artists and fugitives from the law."

== Career ==
Kathner was born in Adelaide, South Australia, to a coachmaker William, who was a finisher and decorator who worked for Eicke and Kaethner and his wife Grace Fletcher and educated at St Peter's College.

He studied art under Hans Heysen and became a sketch artist. He broke into the film industry in the early 1930s by working on set designs. His first movie was Phantom Gold (1937).

Kathner and Brooks achieved their first success with their "shocking [for the time] newsreels". The most popular of these was about the unsolved murder case, The Pyjama Girl Murder. The newsreel was about to be distributed internationally when World War II broke out.

Kathner and Brook's features were essentially B-grade movies, and dealt with typically Australian topics such as Ned Kelly and horse-racing.

They were often in trouble with the law.

Kathner died in 1954.

=== Hunt Angels ===
Hunt Angels (2006) is a feature-length documentary which re-enacts Kathner and Brooks' "movie-making spree that took on the Hollywood barons, a corrupt police Commissioner and the (so-called) cultural cringe, all in their passionate pursuit to make Australian films. On the run from police across thousands of miles, they would stop at almost nothing to get their films made." Hunt Angels "uses an innovative digital composite technique whereby the characters come alive in the real world of Sydney in the 30s and 40s".

The film was directed by Alec Morgan. It stars Ben Mendelsohn and Victoria Hill, playing the roles of Kathner and Brooks, and includes interviews with "real" people such as actor Bud Tingwell, filmmaker/distributor Andrew Pike, and Kathner's son, Paul F. Kathner.

=== Feature films ===
- Phantom Gold (1937)
- Below the Surface (1938)
- Wings of Destiny (1940)
- Racing Luck (1941)
- The Glenrowan Affair (1951), aka A Message to Kelly

=== Newsreels ===
- Australia Today – Lucky Strike at Larkinville (1938)
- Australia Today – Customs Officers Fight Against Drugs (1938)
- Australia Today – The Pyjama Girl Murder Case (1939)
- Australia Today – Fort Denison (1939)
- Australia Today – Man Eater (1939)
- Australia Today – Men of Tomorrow (1939)

=== Writings ===
- Let's Make a Movie (1945)

=== Incomplete projects ===
- Falling for Fame. A project Kathner tried to make with Stan Tolhurst prior to Phantom Gold, set against the background of the film industry
- Diamonds in the Rough. A proposed follow up to Below the Surface
- An unnamed film of the life of Adam Lindsay Gordon
- The Kellys of Tobruk (1943). A planned comedy set against the siege of Tobruk.

== Alma Brooks ==
Alma Brooks was an Australian filmmaker, best known for her association with Rupert Kathner.

Although rarely mentioned in contemporary publications, she was a key partner in Kathner's filmmaking endeavours from the 1930s until his death in 1954. She co-produced, operated the camera, edited, co-scripted and acted in his films, and also participated in Kathner's less legal endeavours.

This included involvement in a legal case in 1942 where she and Kathner were accused of defrauding someone of unsound mind.

In 1944 they were in legal trouble again being charged with conspiracy to defraud investors of a proposed movie Kelly of Tobruk but were acquitted. In 1940, Brooks when working with an editor, was involved in a fight at a film production company.

=== Select filmography ===
- Australia Today – The Pyjama Girl Murder Case (1939)
- Wings of Destiny (1940)
- Racing Luck (1941)
- The Glenrowan Affair (1951)

=== In popular culture ===
She was played by Victoria Hill in the film Hunt Angels (2006).

== Sources ==
- Edwards, Russel (2006) "Hunt Angels (Review)" in Variety Accessed: 25 February 2008
- Kalina, Paul (2006) "When film's short poppies hold their heads high" in theage.com.au Accessed: 25 February 2008
- Morgan, Alec (200?) "Lost City of the Senses" in Scan: Journal of Media Arts and Culture Accessed: 25 February 2008
