= John Nugent-Hayward =

- Born: Harold Thomas Newton; 14 May 1895; Sligo, County Sligo, Ireland
- Died: 22 January 1957 (aged 61); Perth, Western Australia, Australia
- Other name: John Hayward
- Occupations: Actor, musician
- Known for: Founder of Perth Symphony Orchestra

Harold Thomas Newton (14 May 1895 – January 22 1957), known professionally as John Nugent-Hayward, billed also as John Hayward, was an Irish-born Australian actor and musician who founded the Perth Symphony Orchestra. He had extensive experience in radio, stage and film.

== Biography ==
Nugent-Hayward was born in Sligo, County Sligo, Ireland, his father was a conductor and had his son taught violin and clarinet, he raised in England before moving to Australia in the 1920s after served in World War I and having trained in medical studies at the London University, before a brief venture in trading in Algeria. He became one of the best known radio actors in the country firstly at 6WF, acting and writing plays.

He is reported as being (as Newton) founder of the Perth Symphony Orchestra and was its conductor for six years. He then left for Sydney, where he worked as radio actor for the ABC, playing the wise old owl in the 2GB Children's Session. He played the part of Dr Jim Gordon in the radio serial Blue Hills. Gordon Grimsdale (who assumed that role, perhaps briefly, in December 1949) took over the part of Dr Gordon when Nugent-Hayward died.

He also worked at the BBC before his death in Perth, Western Australia in January 1957.

== Select film credits ==
- South West Pacific (1943)
- The Overlanders (1946)
