= Sands of Time (EP) =

Sands of Time EP

EP by Black Majesty
- Released: 2002
- Recorded: Palm Studios, Melbourne, Australia
- Genre: Power metal
- Length: 20:33
- Label: Self released
- Producer: Endel Rivers; Black Majesty

Black Majesty chronology
Sands of Time EP (2002)	Sands of Time (2003)

Sands of Time EP is the debut EP by the Australian power metal band Black Majesty. It was originally released under the band's second name of Arkaya.

Chronicles of Chaos rated it 6.5 out of ten.

== Track listing ==
All songs written by Black Majesty & Cory Betts.

1. Fall of the Reich - 05:16
2. Guardian - 06:57
3. Beyond Reality - 08:19

== Credits ==
=== Band members ===
- John "Gio" Cavaliere − lead vocals
- Stevie Janevski − guitars, backing vocals
- Hanny Mohamed − guitars, keyboards
- Pavel Konvalinka − drums

=== Additional musicians ===
- Evan Harris − Bass on track 2
- Cory Betts − Bass on tracks 1 & 3
- Danny Cecati - Dual vocal on track 3
- Pep Samartino - Keyboards and backing vocals on track 3
- Jason Old - Backing Vocals on track 2
- Endel Rivers - Keyboards on track 1

=== Production and other arrangements ===
- Endel Rivers - Engineering, Mixing, Mastering
- Mark Kelson - Cover concept, artwork, Sleeve design
