= Racing Luck (1941 film) =

1941 film by Rupert Kathner

- Directed by: Rupert Kathner
- Produced by: Rupert Kathner; Alma Brooks (associate)
- Starring: Joe Valli; George Lloyd
- Cinematography: Tasman Higgins
- Production company: Fanfare Films
- Distributed by: British Empire Films
- Release date: 21 November 1941
- Running time: 66 mins
- Country: Australia
- Language: English

Racing Luck is a 1941 Australian comedy film directed by Rupert Kathner and starring Joe Valli, George Lloyd and Marshall Crosby.

== Plot ==
Two First World War veterans, Blue and Darkie, save a sick race horse from being put down. Bluey restores it to healthy using potions used on camels during the war. The horse starts to win races but Darkie gets too excited, suffers a stroke and dies.

== Cast ==
- Joe Valli – Darkie
- George Lloyd as Bluey
- Marshall Crosby – Sir Reginald Franklin
- Olga Moore – Sylvia Perry
- Keith Wood – Robert Franklin
- Connie Martyn – Mrs Perry
- Darby Munro – Himself
- Raymond Longford

== Production ==
Rupert Kathner and his partner Alma Brooks set up the production company Fanfare Films in 1941. The film was shot in mid-1941 at a small studio in North Sydney. There were only a few location scenes, such as a flashback scene of a battle.

During filming the movie was titled For Services Rendered. Music was compiled from popular classics.

== Release ==
The film had a minor release. Although the jockey Darby Munro, who had a cameo, described it as the best Australian film he had ever seen, reception was not positive. A critic from The Australian Women's Weekly described it as "one of the more amateurish local efforts" with "little entertainment value. [The] plot is trivial and jerkily developed, while the acting is at times painfully lame." The Sydney Morning Herald reported that while the film demonstrated "support pictures could be produced here for very little money... they must... have better production and direction and a better story than Racing Luck.

In 1942, Kathner and his partner Alma Brooks were accused of taking money from an investor who was not mentally competent.They were later charged with conspiracy to defraud investors in Fanfare Films, but were acquitted.

== Bibliography ==
- Reade, Eric. History and heartburn: the saga of Australian film, 1896-1978. Associated University Presses, 1981.
