= Stan Tolhurst =

Australian actor, technician and filmmaker

Stan Tolhurst was an Australian actor, technician and filmmaker. He worked as a dancer on stage before joining Cinesound Productions for whom he would add humour to newsreels. He also worked as a producer and ran a film studio.

== Select Credits ==
- The Burgomeister (1935) – actor
- Phantom Gold (1937) – actor, producer
- Let George Do It (1938) – actor
- This Place Australia (1938) (shorts) – producer
- Below the Surface (1938) – actor, producer
- Bush Christmas (1947)
