= I've Got a Feeling (The Sands of Time song) =

Song by The Sands of Time
- B-side: "Loneliness"
- Released: 1970
- Label: MTCC MT-1004
- Songwriter: Eric Baragar
- Producers: J. Driscol, R. Martin

"I've Got a Feeling" was a 1970 single for the Canadian group, The Sands of Time. It was a hit for the group that year.

== Background ==
"I've Got a Feeling" was a chart hit on both the RPM 100 chart and the Top 50 MAPL chart in 1970. Due to the song's popularity, the group The Sands of Time were signed to the Toronto Fair Bandshell show.

== Reception and airplay ==
According to the 13 June 1970 issue of RPM Weekly, "I've Got a Feeling" was a national breakout, charting on playlists on multiple Canadian radio stations.

== Charts ==
For the week of 6 June 1970, "I've Got a Feeling" debuted at No. No. 21 in the Top 50 MAPL chart and at No. 81 in the RPM 100 chart.

The song peaked at No. 2 nationally in Canada.
