= Endel Rivers =

Estonian-Australian musician and producer

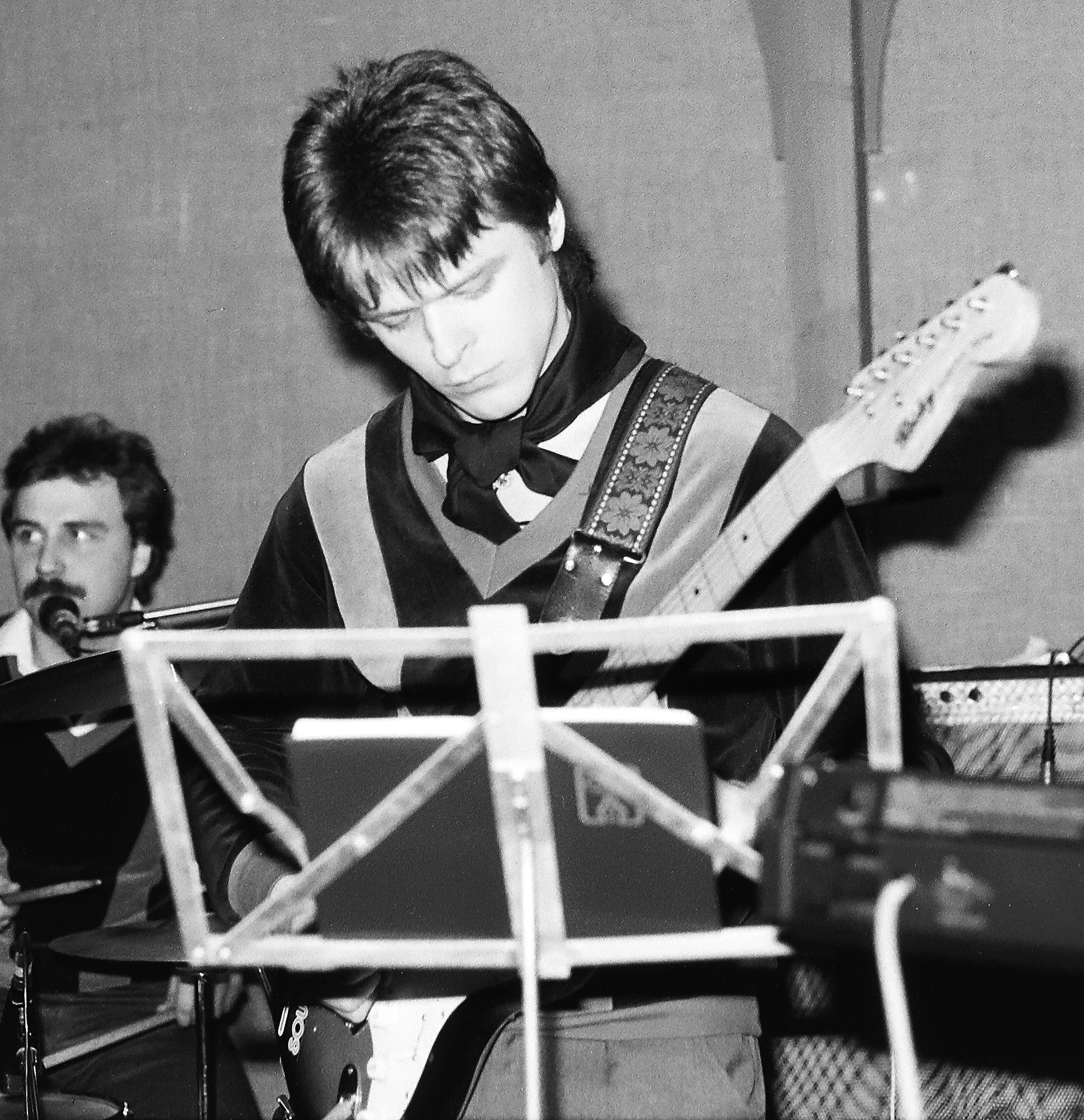
- Endel Jõgi in 1985

Background information
- Born: Endel Jõgi; 15 April 1959 (age 67); Narva, then part of Estonian SSR, Soviet Union
- Genres: Jazz, Progressive rock, Rock
- Instruments: Guitar, Keyboards
- Years active: 1970s–present
- Website: 1214productions.com

Endel Rivers (born Endel Jõgi; 15 April 1959) is an Estonian-Australian musician, composer and music producer. He started his music career in the 1970s. Hailing originally from Estonia, Endel moved to Australia in 1989. In 2006 Rivers was given an award at Australia's premier MusicOz Awards in instrumental category.

== Discography ==
- Hardbite (2002, CD) Issued by Palmstudios
- Hardbite II (2005, CD) Issued by Palmstudios
- The Jaz Symphony (2011, CD) Issued by Palmstudios
