= 1939 in Australia =

- Decades: 1910s; 1920s; 1930s; 1940s; 1950s
- See also: 1939 in Australian literature; Other events of 1939; Timeline of Australian history

The following lists events that happened during 1939 in Australia.

1939 in Australia
- Monarch: George VI
- Governor-General: Alexander Hore-Ruthven, 1st Baron Gowrie
- Prime minister: Joseph Lyons, Earle Page, Robert Menzies
- Population: 6,967,754
- Elections: WA

== Incumbents ==
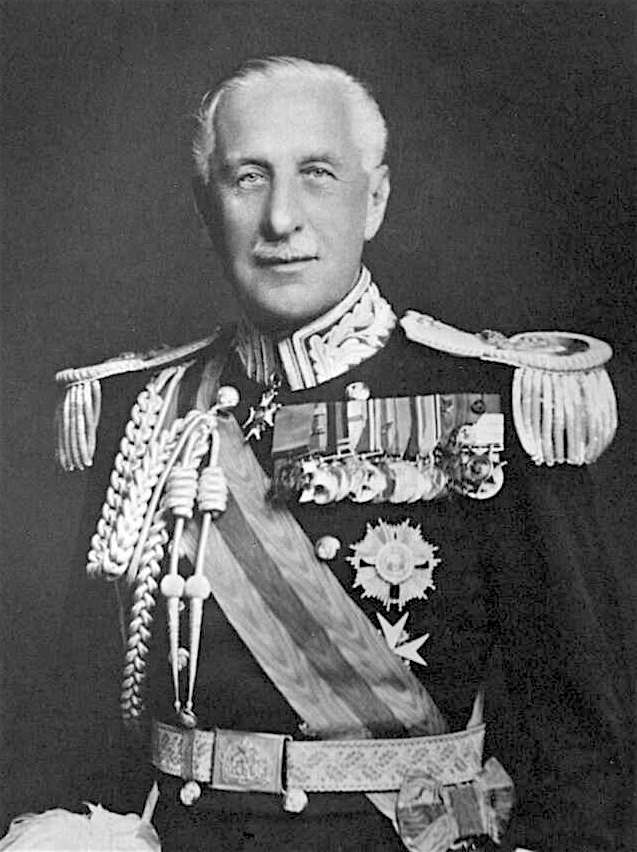
Lord Gowrie

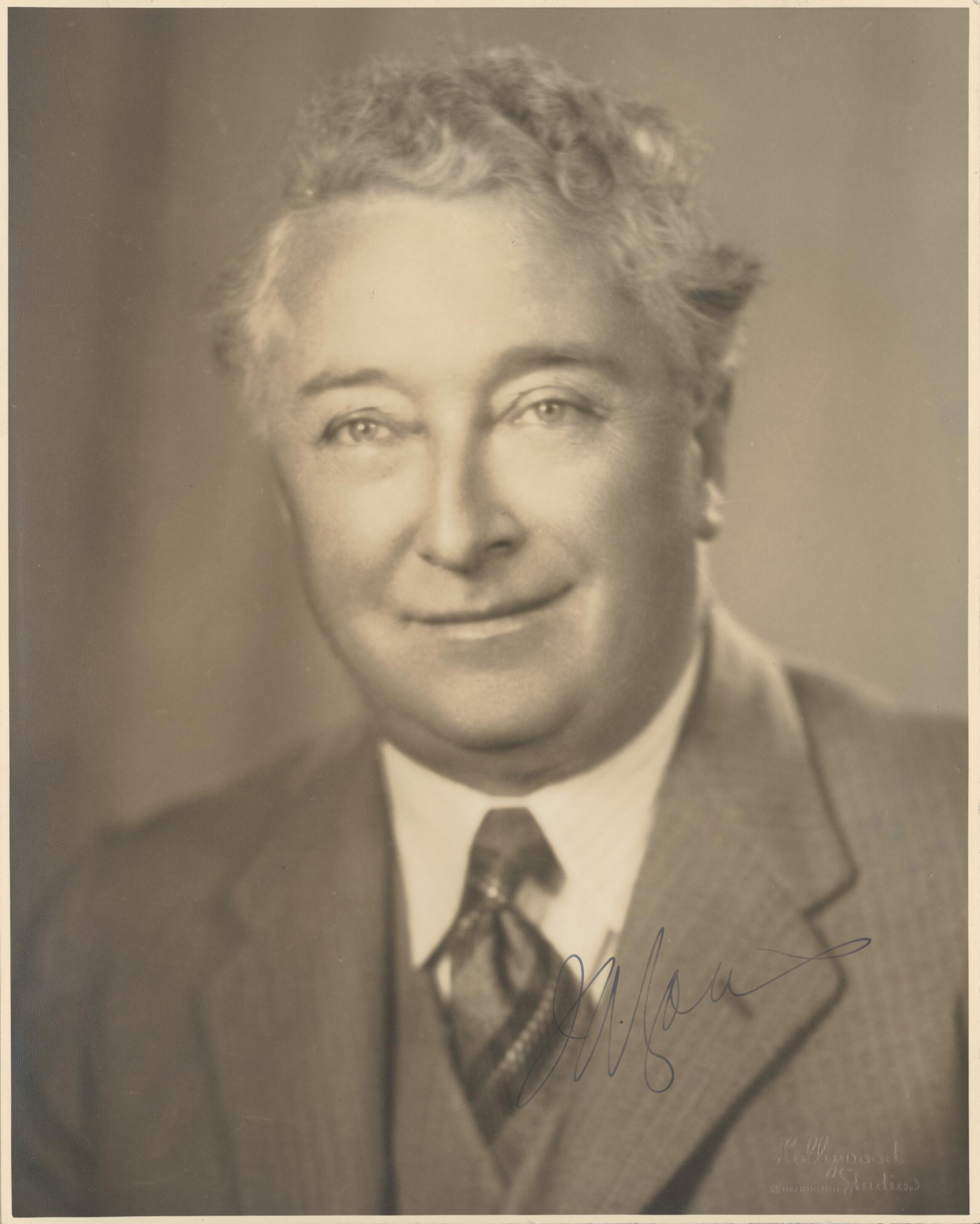
Joseph Lyons

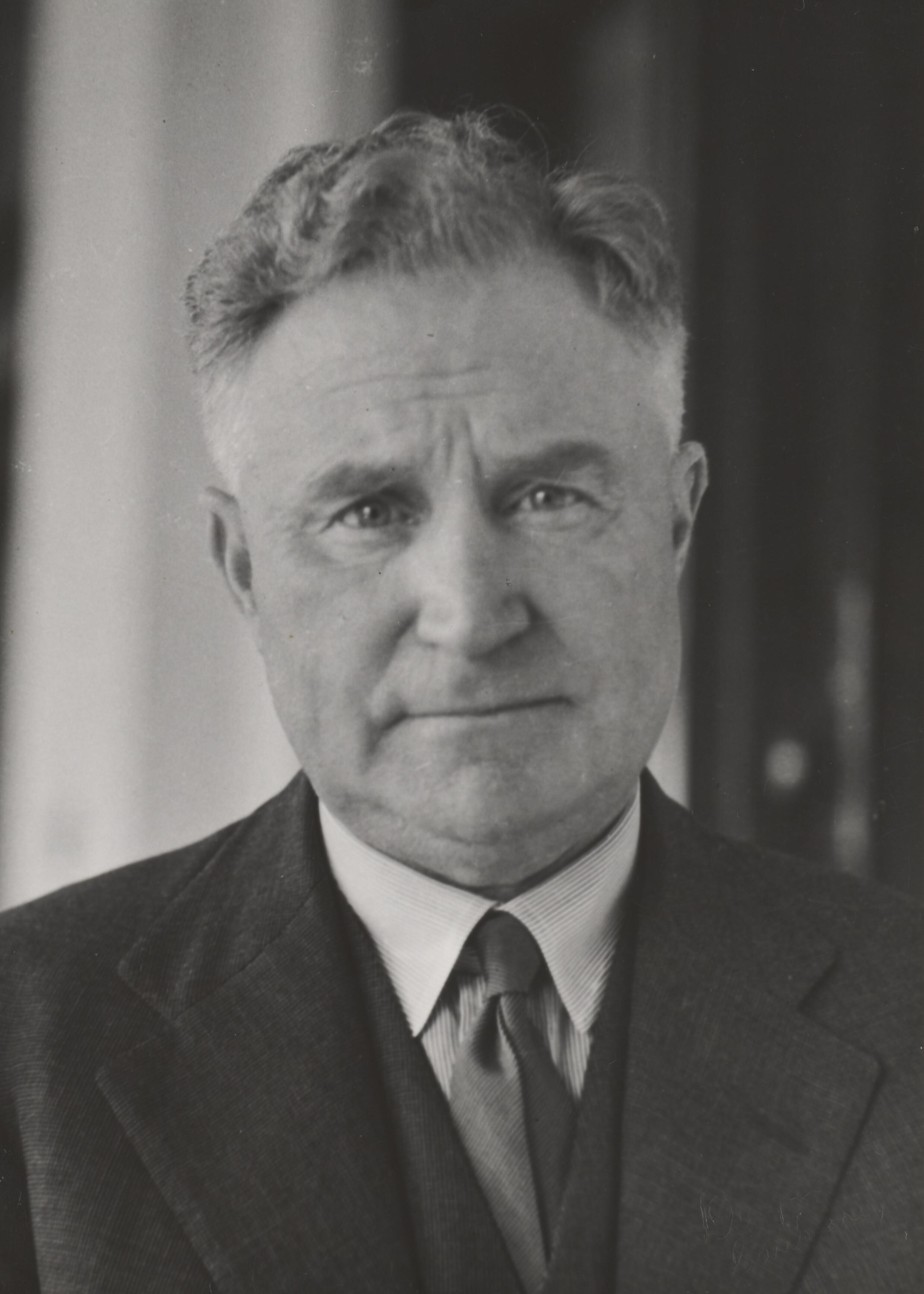
Sir Earle Page

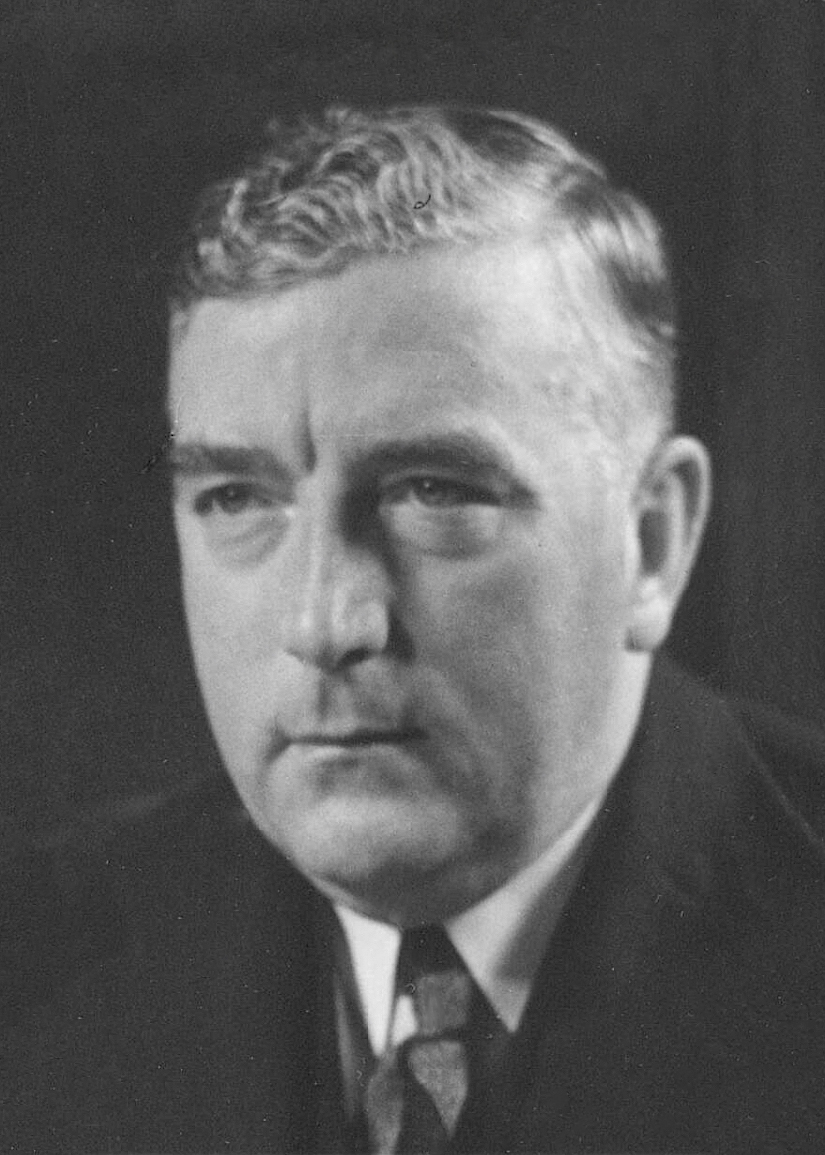
Robert Menzies

- Monarch – George VI
- Governor-General – Alexander Hore-Ruvthen, 1st Baron Gowrie
- Prime Minister – Joseph Lyons (until 7 April), then Sir Earle Page (until 26 April), then Robert Menzies
- Chief Justice – Sir John Latham

=== State Premiers ===
- Premier of New South Wales – Bertram Stevens (until 5 August) then Alexander Mair
- Premier of Queensland – William Forgan Smith
- Premier of South Australia – Thomas Playford IV
- Premier of Tasmania – Albert Ogilvie (until 10 June), then Edmund Dwyer-Gray (until 18 December), then Robert Cosgrove
- Premier of Victoria – Albert Dunstan
- Premier of Western Australia – John Willcock

=== State Governors ===
- Governor of New South Wales – John Loder, 2nd Baron Wakehurst
- Governor of Queensland – Sir Leslie Orme Wilson
- Governor of South Australia – Sir Winston Dugan (until 23 February), then Sir Malcolm Barclay-Harvey (from 12 August)
- Governor of Tasmania – Sir Ernest Clark
- Governor of Victoria – William Vanneck, 5th Baron Huntingfield (until 4 April), then Sir Winston Dugan (from 17 July)
- Governor of Western Australia – none appointed

== Events ==
- 8 January – Federal interior minister John McEwen released a white paper detailing the New Deal for Aborigines, a policy by which Indigenous Australians in the Northern Territory could receive full civil rights in exchange for cultural assimilation.
- 13 January – The bushfires of Black Friday kill 70 people in Victoria.
- 27 March – The first CAC Wirraway training aircraft, A20-3, takes to the air at Fishermans Bend, Victoria.
- 7 April – Prime Minister Joseph Lyons dies of a sudden heart attack, the first Prime Minister to die in office. Sir Earle Page, the leader of the Country Party is appointed caretaker Prime Minister until the United Australia Party can elect a new leader.
- 26 April – Robert Menzies is elected leader of the United Australia Party, and is sworn in as Prime Minister.
- 10 June – Premier of Tasmania Albert Ogilvie dies in office. Edmund Dwyer-Gray acts as Premier until he is officially elected as leader of the Labor Party in Tasmania on 6 July.
- 3 September – World War II begins. Australia declares war on Germany, following the United Kingdom and British Dominions' declaration of same, after the German invasion of Poland.
- 15 September – Robert Menzies announces a new War Cabinet.
- 1 December – Australia agrees to take 15,000 Jewish refugees fleeing Europe, following the German occupation of Austria and Czechoslovakia.
- 18 December – Edmund Dwyer-Gray steps aside as Premier of Tasmania, by prior arrangement with Robert Cosgrove to assume the premiership.

== Arts and literature ==
- Max Meldrum wins the Archibald Prize with his portrait of The Hon G J Bell, Speaker of the House of Representatives

== Sport ==
- Rivette wins the Melbourne Cup and Caulfield Cup
- Mosaic wins the Cox Plate
- South Australia wins the Sheffield Shield
- Balmain win the 1939 NSWRFL premiership, defeating South Sydney 33–4. Newtown finish in last place, claiming the wooden spoon.

== Births ==
=== January ===
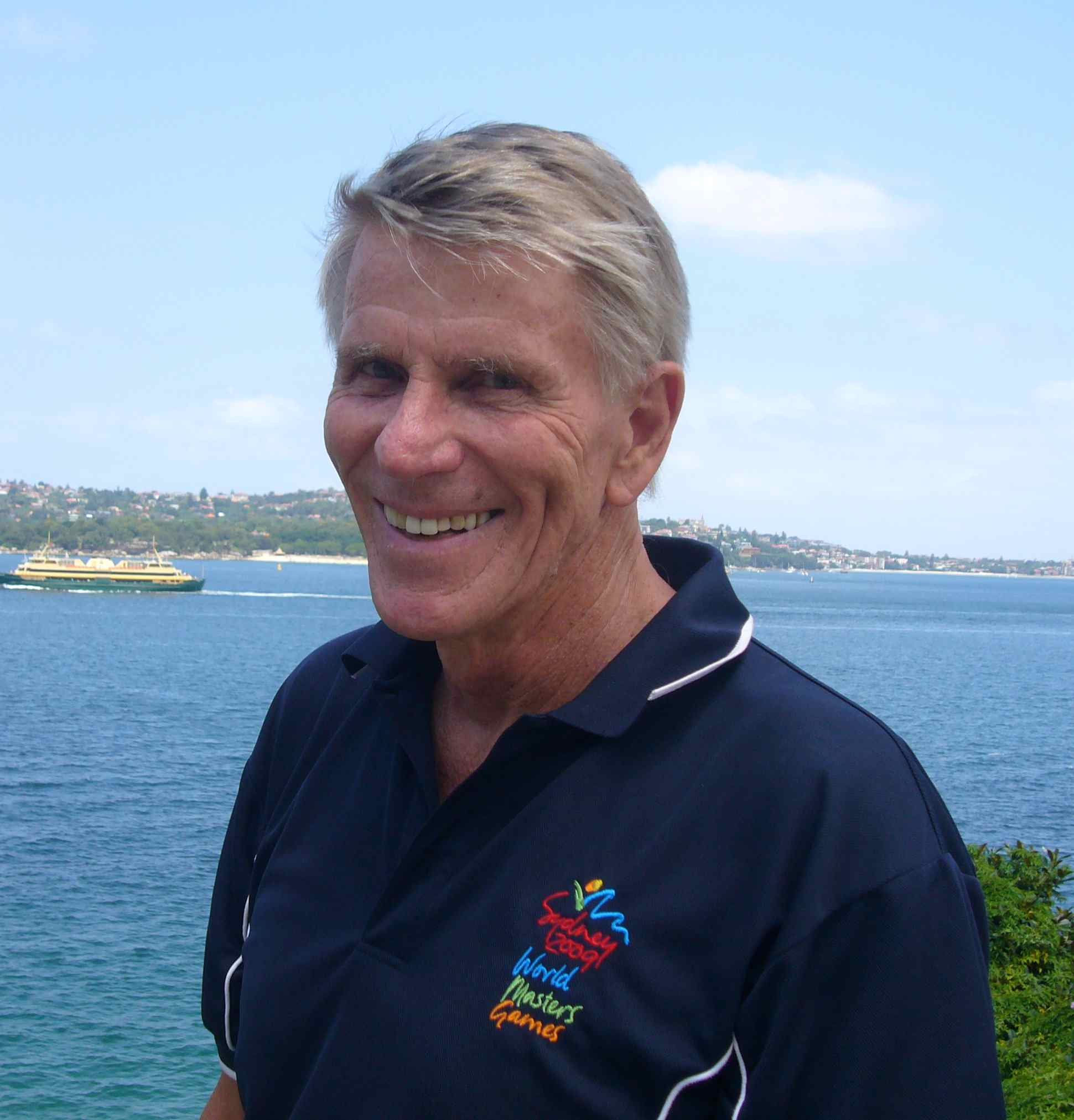
Murray Rose

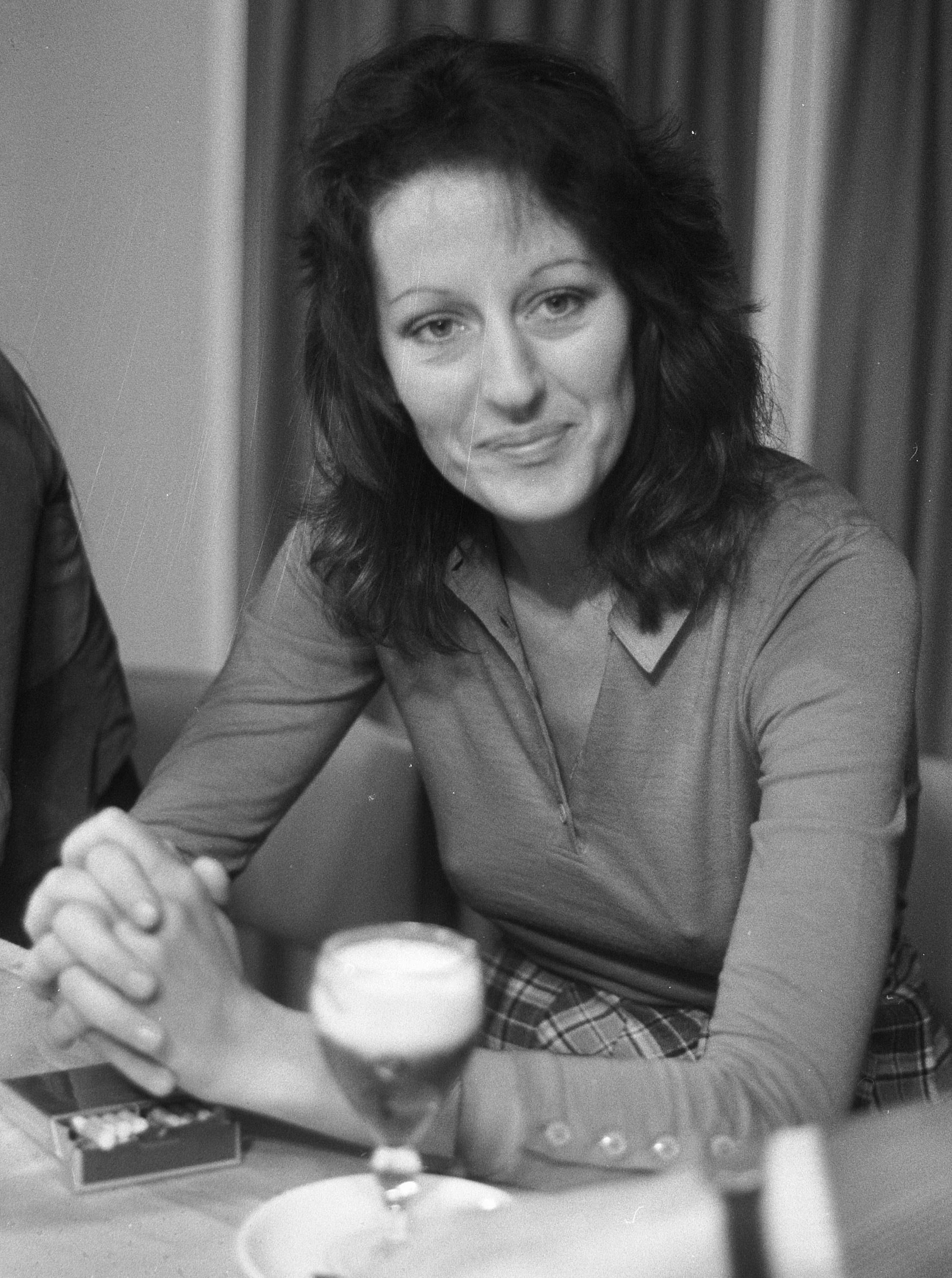
Germaine Greer

- 3 January – Janice Crosio, New South Wales politician
- 4 January – J. S. Harry, poet (d. 2015)
- 6 January
  - Roderick Weir Home, academic and historian
  - Murray Rose, Olympic swimmer (born in the United Kingdom) (d. 2012)
- 9 January
  - Max Burr, Tasmanian politician
  - Rik Kemp, cartoonist (born in the United Kingdom)
  - Gary Shearston, singer, songwriter and priest (d. 2013)
- 10 January – Jill Kitson, radio broadcaster and literary journalist (d. 2013)
- 12 January – John Gregg, actor (d. 2021)
- 15 January – Ken Doolan, rear admiral and author
- 20 January – Paul Braddy, 28th Deputy Premier of Queensland
- 23 January – Peter Richardson, Western Australian politician
- 29 January – Germaine Greer, academic and feminist
- 30 January – Dale Baker, 34th South Australian Leader of the Opposition (d. 2012)
- 31 January – Paddy Guinane, Australian rules footballer (Richmond) (d. 2019)

=== February ===
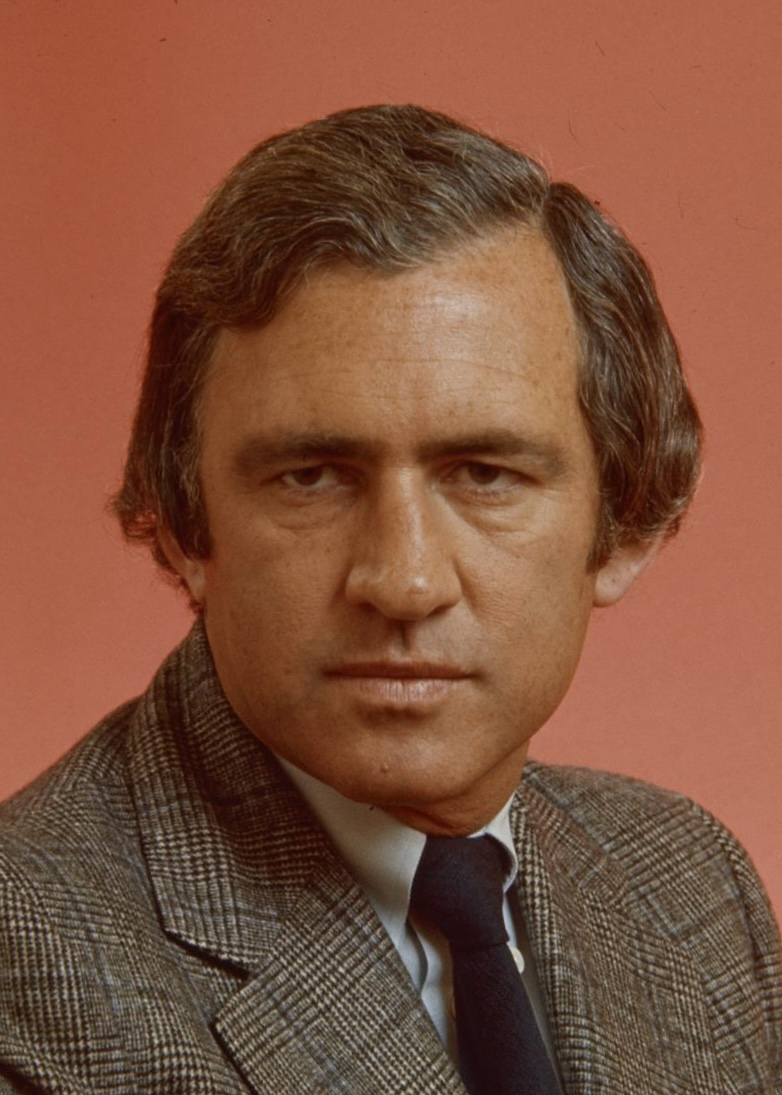
Andrew Peacock

- 1 February – John Haslem, Australian Capital Territory politician
- 5 February – Ian Norman, businessman and retail executive (d. 2014)
- 7 February
  - Betty Bobbitt, actress (born in the United States) (d. 2020)
  - Ian Davis, Victorian politician (d. 2016)
- 11 February – Gary Hooper, Paralympian athlete (d. 2025)
- 12 February – Nita Cunningham, Queensland politician (d. 2015)
- 13 February – Andrew Peacock, 22nd Federal Leader of the Opposition (d. 2021)
- 16 February – Peter Heerey, Federal Court judge (d. 2021)
- 19 February – Beatrice Faust, co-founder of Women's Electoral Lobby and author (d. 2019)
- 23 February – Elaine Lee, actress (born in South Africa) (d. 2014)
- 25 February – Gerald Murnane, writer
- 27 February – Harry Roberts, rugby union player
- 28 February – Ron Leeson, Western Australian politician (d. 2025)

=== March ===
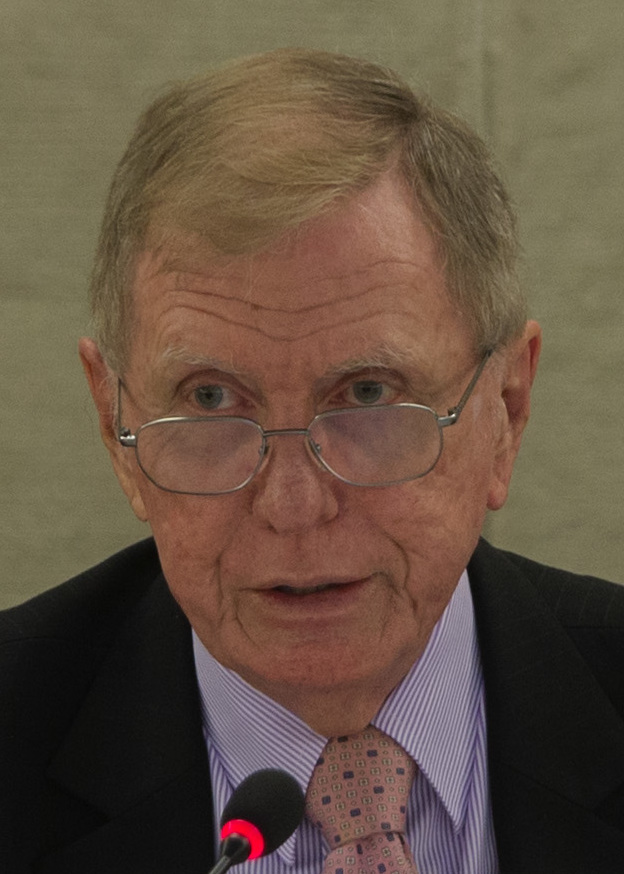
Michael Kirby

- 1 March
  - Ivan Petch, New South Wales politician
  - Alan Thorne, academic (d. 2012)
- 5 March – Tony Rundle, 40th Premier of Tasmania (d. 2025)
- 7 March – Tony Lamb, Victorian politician
- 8 March – Peter Nicholls, literary scholar and critic (d. 2018)
- 10 March – Lin Powell, Queensland politician
- 11 March – Bob Francis, radio presenter (born in Egypt) (d. 2016)
- 18 March – Michael Kirby, High Court justice and academic
- 20 March
  - Patrick Quilty, geologist and palaeontologist (d. 2018)
  - Johnny Rebb, rock and roll singer (d. 2014)
- 25 March – Ted Mullighan, South Australian Supreme Court judge (d. 2011)

=== April ===
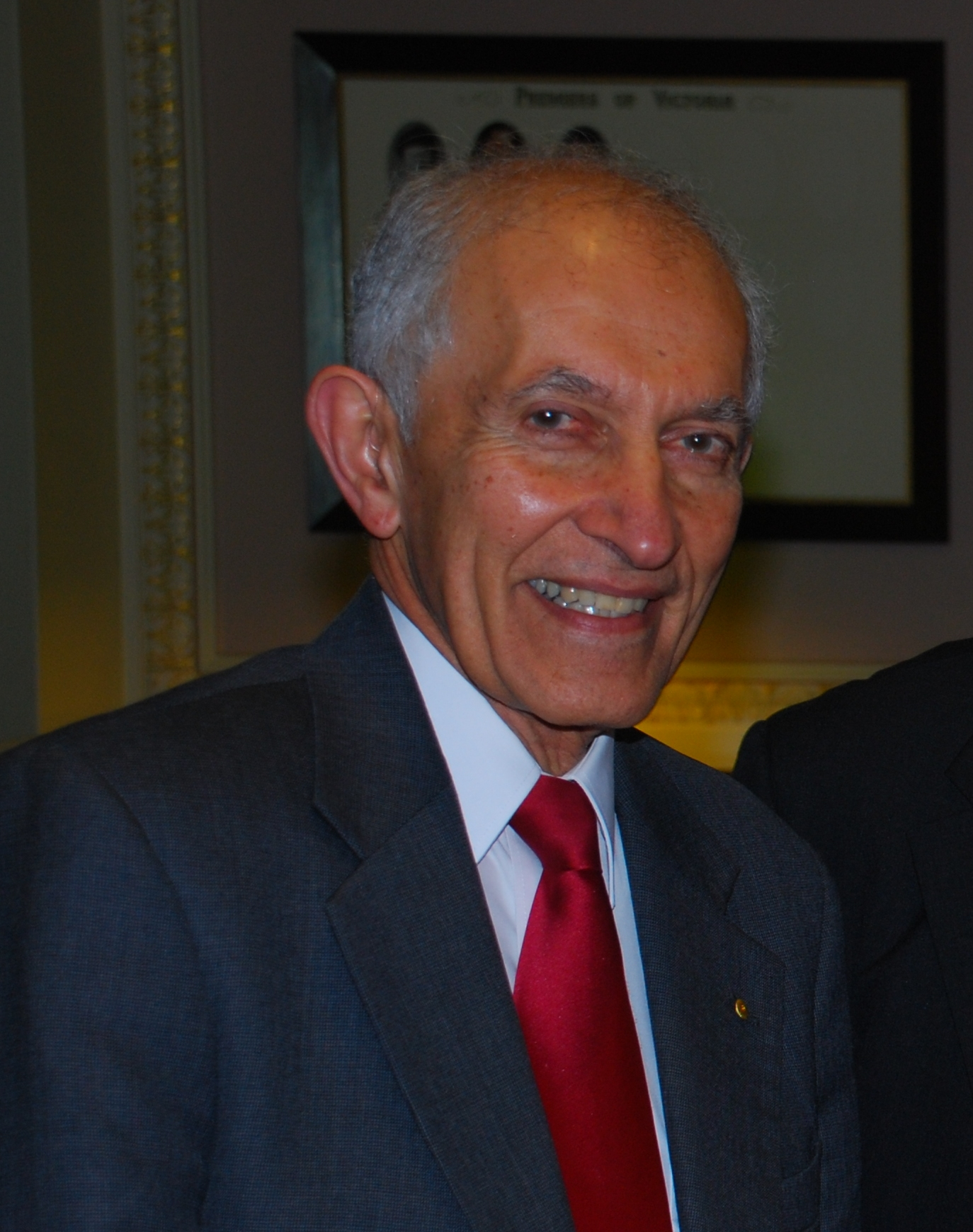
David de Kretser

- 4 April – Alex George, botanist
- 7 April – Brett Whiteley, artist (d. 1992)
- 12 April
  - Johnny Raper, rugby league footballer (d. 2022)
  - Lyall Watson, botanist and author (born in South Africa) (d. 2008)
- 14 April – Jennifer Fowler, composer
- 20 April
  - Elspeth Ballantyne, actress
  - Chris Heyde, statistician (d. 2008)
- 21 April
  - John Bangsund, science-fiction fan (d. 2020)
  - Irwin Lewis, Indigenous artist (d. 2020)
- 27 April – David de Kretser, 27th Governor of Victoria (born in British Ceylon)

=== May ===
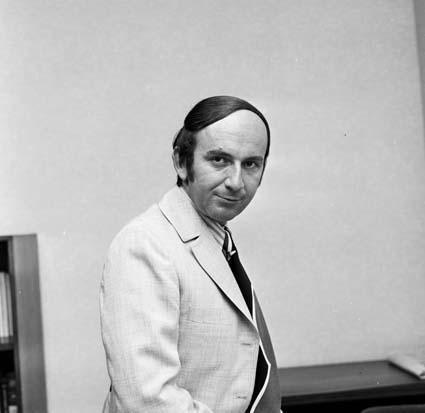
Peter Wilenski

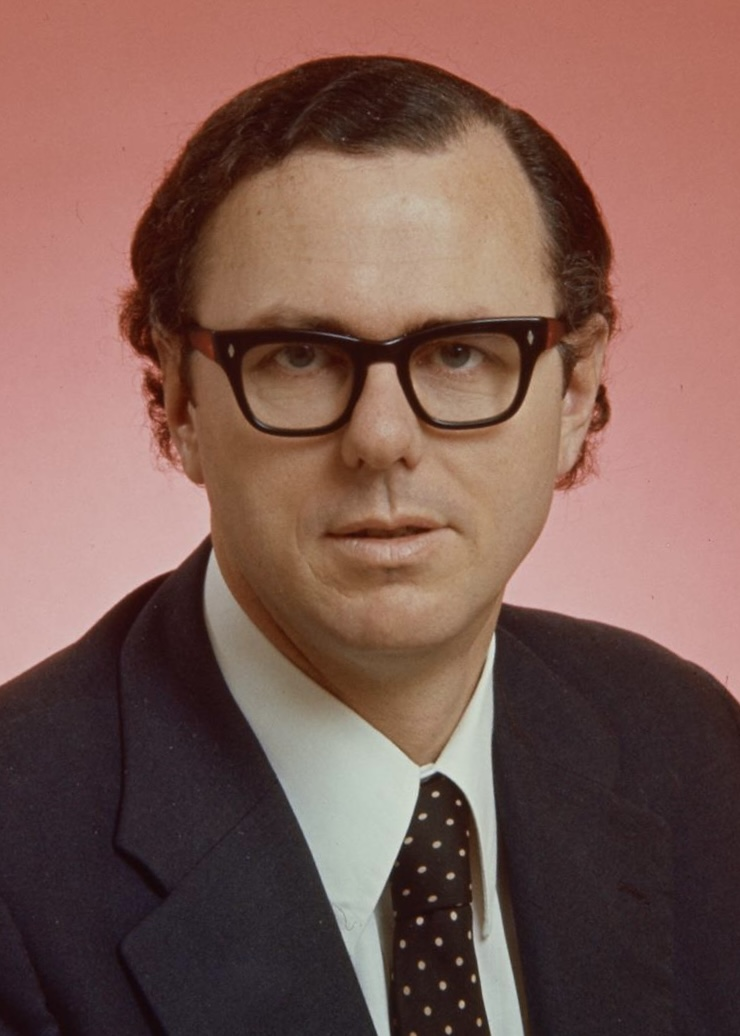
Tony Staley

- 1 May – Roger Degen, New South Wales politician
- 4 May – Alan Carstairs, Western Australian politician
- 9 May
  - Garry Spry, Victorian politician
  - Ken Warby, motorboat racer (d. 2023)
- 10 May – Peter Wilenski, public servant and ambassador (born in Poland) (d. 1994)
- 12 May – Reg Gasnier, rugby league footballer (d. 2014)
- 13 May – Barry Murphy, Victorian politician
- 14 May – John Price, New South Wales politician (d. 2026)
- 15 May – Tony Staley, Victorian politician (d. 2023)
- 22 May – Angus Innes, Queensland politician and former Queensland Liberal leader (born in the United Kingdom)
- 24 May – Alan Hayes, Australian rules footballer (Richmond) (d. 2019)
- 29 May
  - Alby Schultz, New South Wales politician (d. 2015)
  - Roger Steele, Northern Territory politician

=== June ===
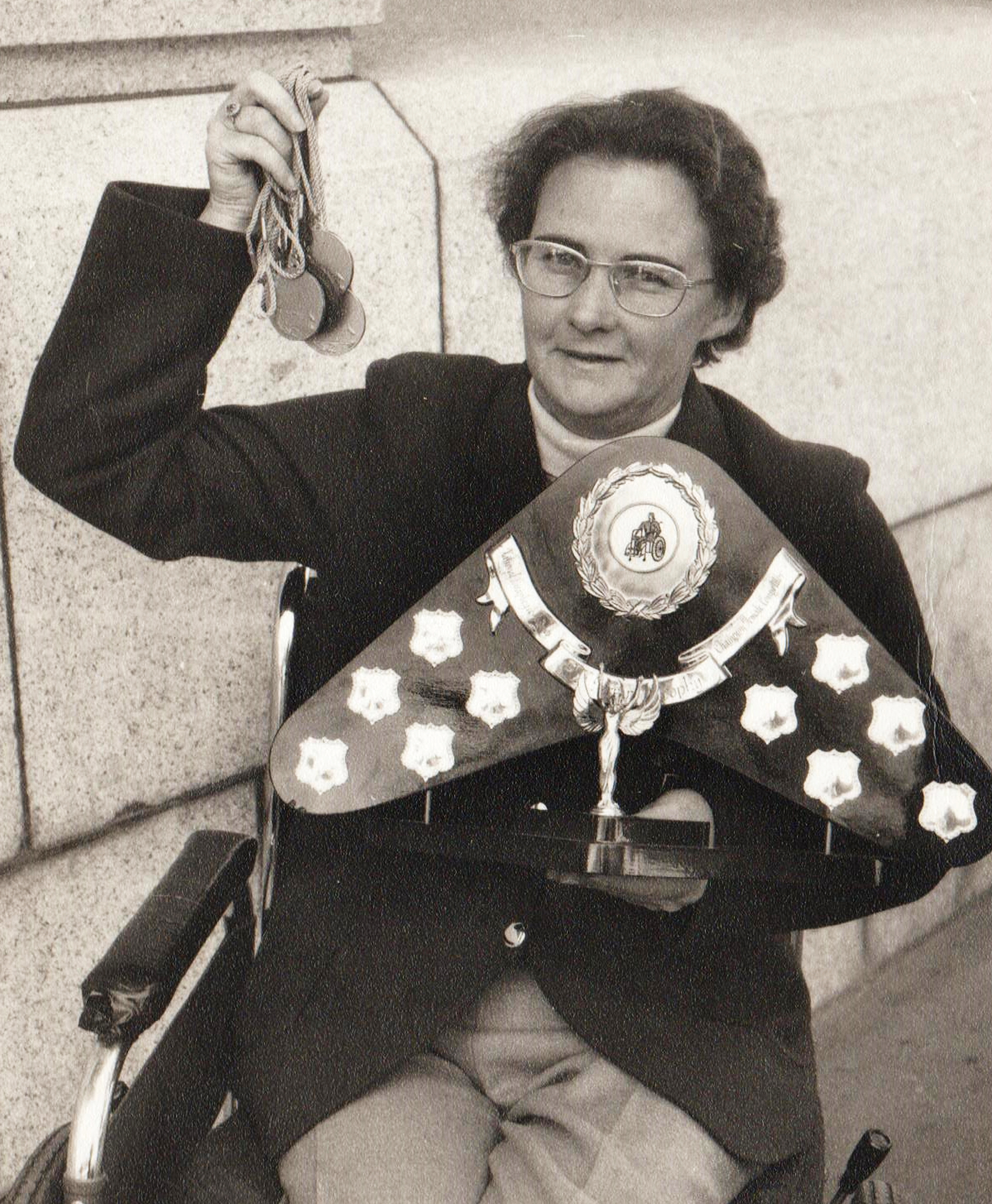
Elaine Schreiber

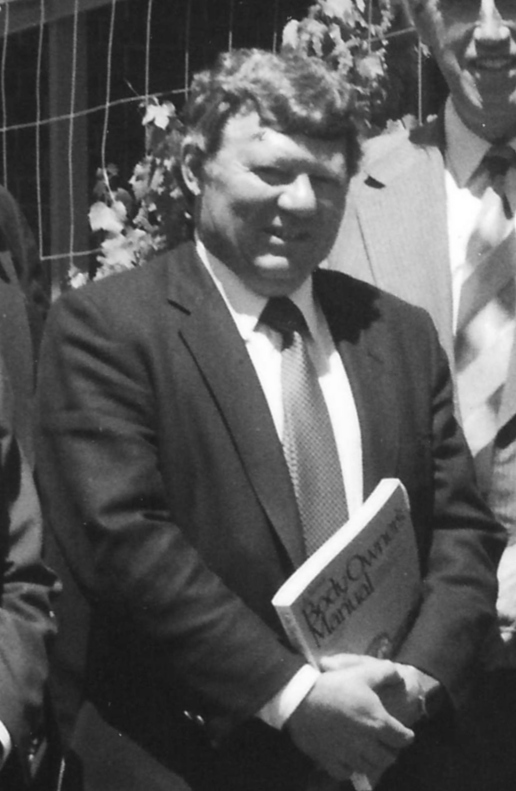
Gordon Bilney

- 1 June – Ernie Tuck, mathematician (d. 2009)
- 3 June – Colin Youren, Australian rules footballer (Hawthorn) (d. 2015)
- 4 June – Elaine Schreiber, Paralympian athlete (d. 2017)
- 5 June – Ron Baensch, racing cyclist (d. 2017)
- 6 June – John Oswald, South Australian politician
- 10 June
  - Charles Abbott, Australian rules footballer (Hawthorn) (d. 2025)
  - John Read, Western Australian politician and former Administrator of the Cocos (Keeling) Islands
- 20 June – Rodger Head, Australian rules footballer (St Kilda) (d. 2012)
- 21 June
  - Gordon Bilney, South Australian politician (d. 2012)
  - Ken Catchpole, rugby union footballer (d. 2017)
  - Marshall Younger, Australian rules footballer (South Melbourne)
- 22 June – Paul Winkler, film director (born in Germany)
- 23 June – David Hannay, film producer (born in New Zealand) (d. 2014)
- 24 June – Annette Andre, actress
- 25 June
  - John Abel, New South Wales politician (d. 2019)
  - David Ramage, rower
  - Brian Lowe, Australian rules footballer (Geelong) (d. 2024)
- 27 June – Neil Hawke, test cricketer and Australian rules footballer (Port Adelaide) (d. 2000)
- 29 June – Alan Connolly, cricketer

=== July ===
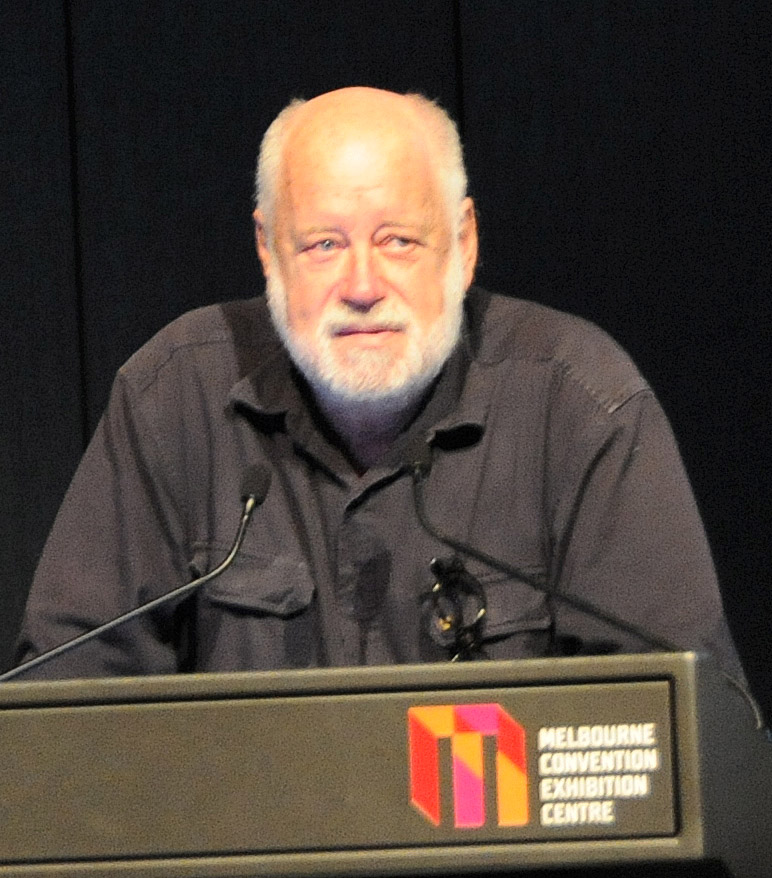
Phillip Adams

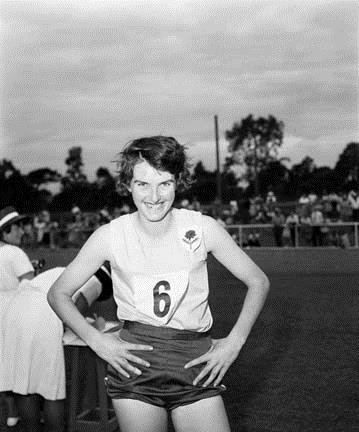
Helen Firth

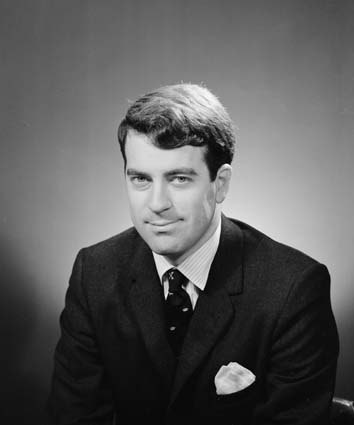
David Connolly

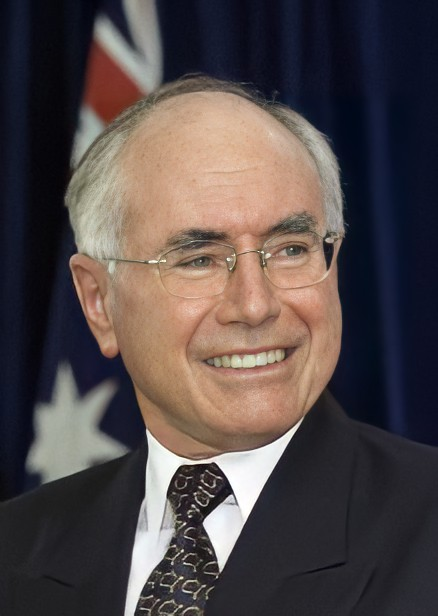
John Howard

- 3 July
  - Frank Blevins, 6th Deputy Premier of South Australia (d. 2013)
  - Michele Brown, Olympic athlete
- 7 July – Ron Evans, Australian rules footballer (Essendon) (d. 2007)
- 9 July – Jack Danzey, rugby league footballer (d. 2020)
- 10 July – Garry Young, Australian rules footballer (Hawthorn)
- 12 July
  - Phillip Adams, broadcaster and writer
  - Helen Frith, athlete
  - Graeme Lee, Australian rules footballer (St Kilda) (d. 2021)
  - Ted Magrath, rugby union player
  - Ann Symonds, New South Wales politician (d. 2018)
- 13 July – John Sinclair, conservationist (d. 2019)
- 14 July – John Murray, New South Wales politician
- 19 July – Victor Kelleher, author (born in the United Kingdom)
- 20 July – David Connolly, New South Wales politician
- 21 July
  - Barbara Scott, Western Australian politician
  - Kevin Wickham, Olympic rower (d. 2020)
- 24 July
  - John Anderson, Olympic sailor
  - Thomas Anderson, Olympic sailor (d. 2010)
- 26 July
  - K. G. Cunningham, cricketer and radio personality
  - John Howard, 25th Prime Minister of Australia
- 28 July
  - Vince Lester, Queensland politician
  - John Zillman, meteorologist
- 29 July – Mark Stoneman, Queensland politician
- 31 July – Bill D'Arcy, Queensland politician

=== August ===
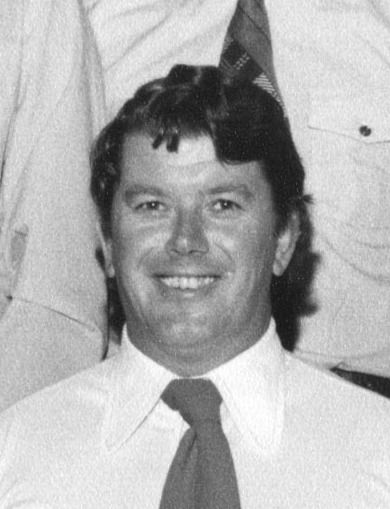
Roger Ryan

- 2 August – Roger Ryan, Northern Territory politician
- 7 August – Sally Thomas, judge and former Administrator of the Northern Territory (born in the United Kingdom)
- 12 August
  - Pam Kilborn, Olympic athlete
  - Mick Veivers, Queensland politician
- 13 August
  - Graeme Campbell, Western Australian politician (born in the United Kingdom) (d. 2025)
  - John Nicholls, Australian rules footballer (Carlton)
- 18 August – Chris Pavlou, Australian rules footballer (Carlton) (d. 2012)
- 23 August – Ray Halligan, Western Australian politician
- 27 August – Len Diett, rugby union and rugby league player (d. 2018)

=== September ===
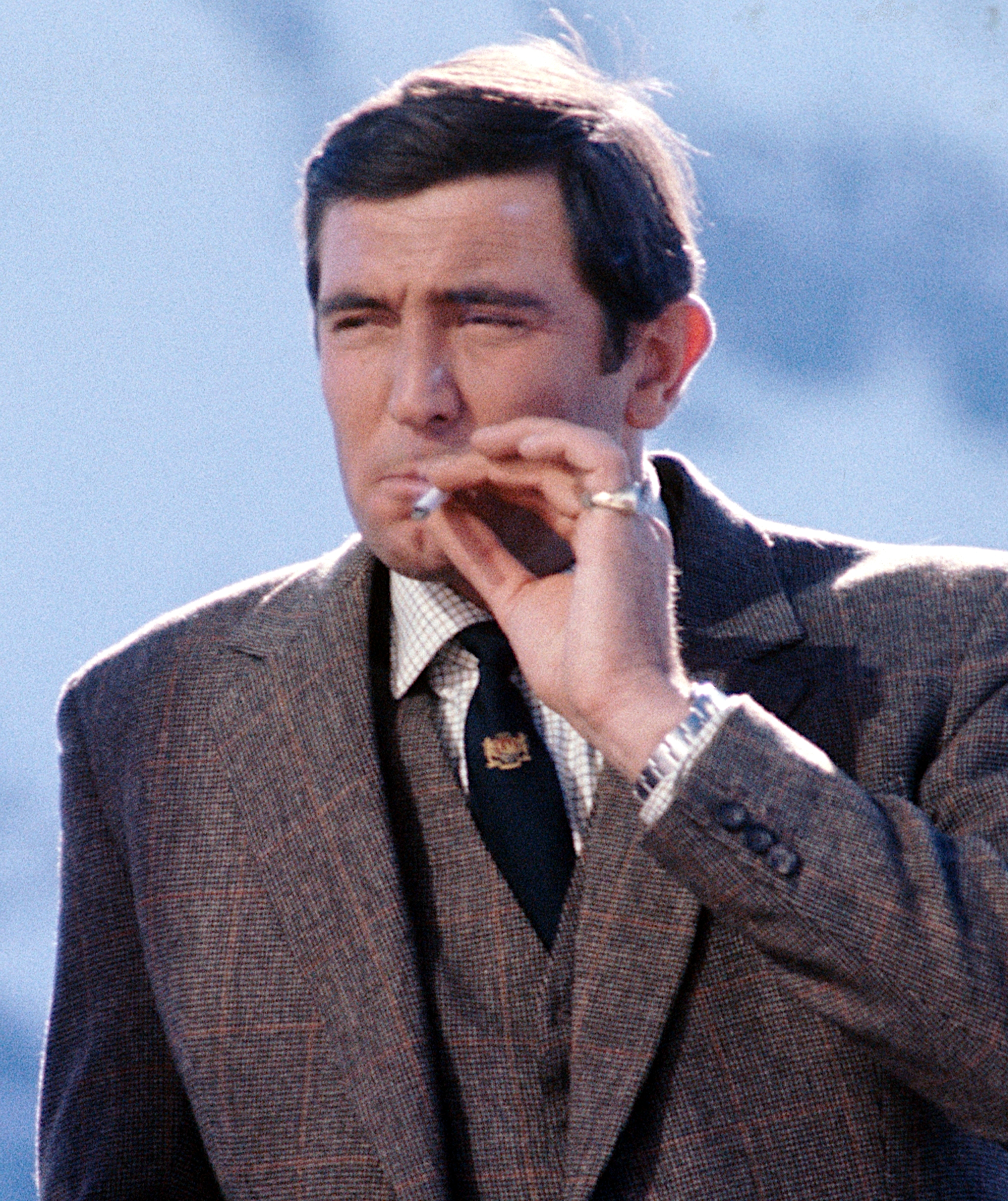
George Lazenby

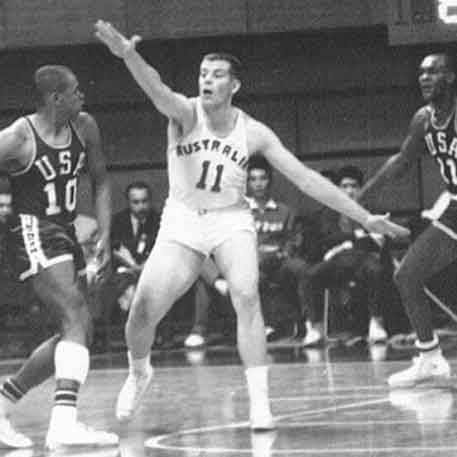
Mike Dancis

- 3 September – John Langmore, Australian Capital Territory politician
- 4 September – Richard Lewis, Western Australian politician (d. 2019)
- 5 September – George Lazenby, actor
- 7 September – John McGrath, Victorian politician (d. 2021)
- 8 September – Lew Mander, organic chemist (born in New Zealand) (d. 2020)
- 9 September
  - Arthur Dignam, actor (d. 2020)
  - Hugh Wirth, veterinarian and animal welfare activist (d. 2018)
- 10 September
  - David Stratton, film critic and historian (d. 2025)
  - Mike Dancis, basketball player (born in Latvia) (d. 2020)
- 13 September – Kevin Rozzoli, New South Wales politician
- 15 September – Ron Walker, businessman, former Lord Mayor of Melbourne (d. 2018)
- 18 September – Gerry Harvey, entrepreneur
- 19 September – Jim Lisle, rugby union and rugby league player (d. 2003)
- 24 September – Tony Messner, South Australian politician and former Administrator of Norfolk Island (d. 2024)

=== October ===
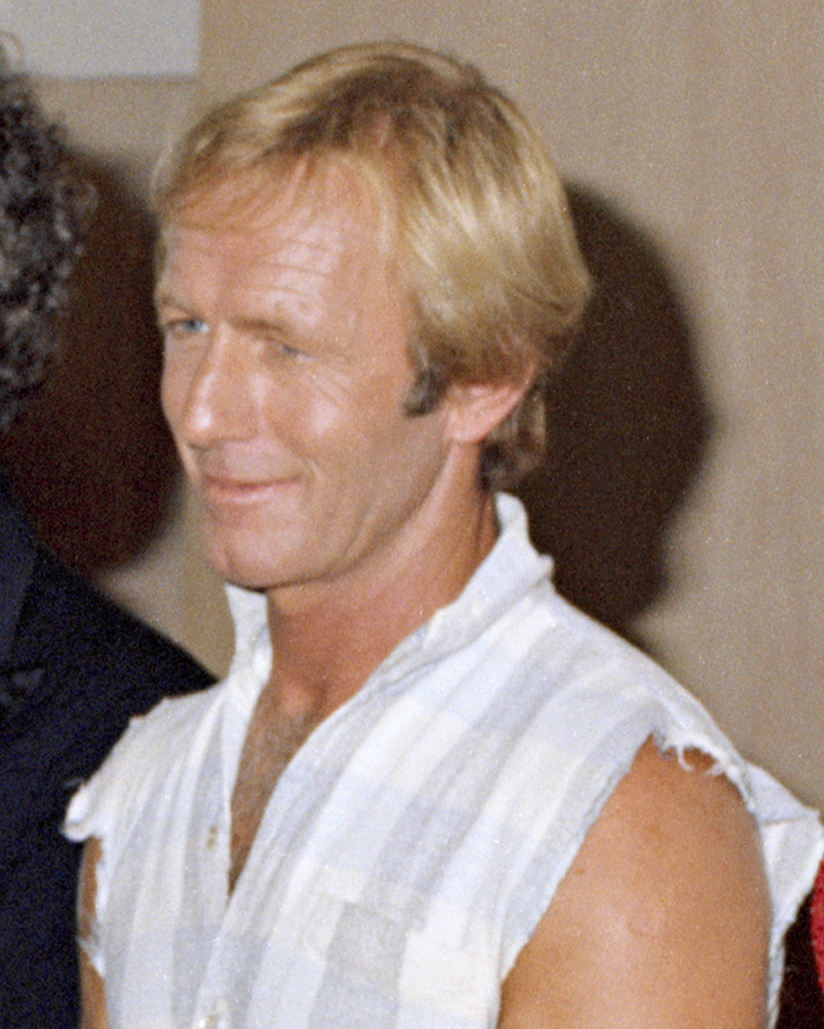
Paul Hogan

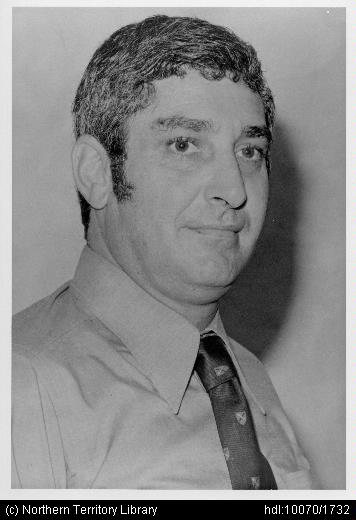
Nick Dondas

- 1 October – Philip Cox, architect
- 3 October – Dave Barsley, rugby league player (d. 2021)
- 4 October – Ivan Mauger, motorcycle speedway racer (born in New Zealand) (d. 2018)
- 5 October – Scott Ashenden, South Australian politician
- 7 October – Clive James, writer and broadcaster (d. 2019)
- 8 October
  - Sam Chisholm, media executive (born in New Zealand) (d. 2018)
  - Paul Hogan, comedian and actor
- 9 October – John Pilger, journalist and filmmaker (d. 2023)
- 12 October – Michael Clyne, linguist, academic, and intellectual (d. 2010)
- 25 October – Terry Gill, actor (born in the United Kingdom) (d. 2015)
- 26 October
  - Barry Cunningham, Victorian politician (d. 2018)
  - Nick Dondas, Northern Territory politician (d. 2024)
- 27 October – Hurtle Lupton, Victorian politician

=== November ===
- 1 November
  - Kevin Pay, Australian rules footballer (Collingwood) (d. 2020)
  - Ted Pickering, New South Wales politician (d. 2025)
  - Barry Pullen, Victorian politician (d. 2024)
- 4 November – George Mallaby, actor and scriptwriter (born in the United Kingdom) (d. 2004)
- 9 November – Philip Cummins, Victorian Supreme Court judge (d. 2019)
- 10 November – Allan Moffat, racing driver (born in Canada) (d. 2025)
- 11 November – Lloyd McDermott, barrister and rugby union player (d. 2019)
- 18 November
  - Max Phipps, actor (d. 2000)
  - Clem Tisdell, economist and professor (d. 2022)
- 19 November – Bruce McMaster-Smith, Australian rules footballer (Carlton) (d. 2017)
- 20 November – Michael Beecher, model and actor (d. 1993)
- 25 November
  - Bob Maza, actor and playwright (d. 2000)
  - Ian Smith, Victorian politician

=== December ===
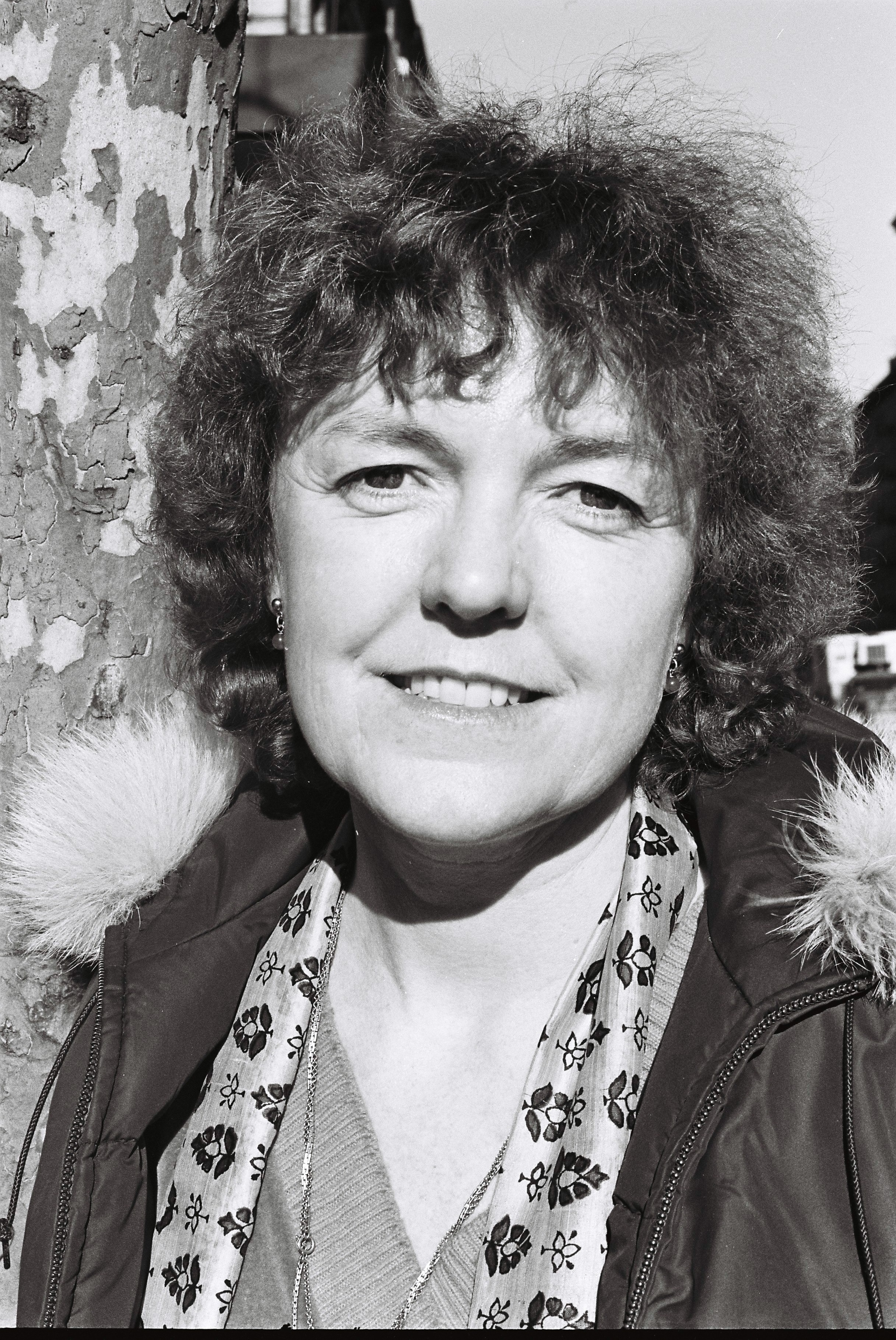
Glenda Adams

- 3 December – Warwick Selvey, Olympic athlete (d. 2018)
- 4 December – Denis Hinton, Queensland politician
- 15 December – Andrew Lohrey, Tasmanian politician
- 18 December – Bob Horne, New South Wales politician
- 22 December – Silvia Smith, Tasmanian politician (d. 2020)
- 26 December
  - Ron Campbell, animator (d. 2021)
  - Fred Schepisi, film director
- 30 December – Glenda Adams, novelist (d. 2007)

== Deaths ==
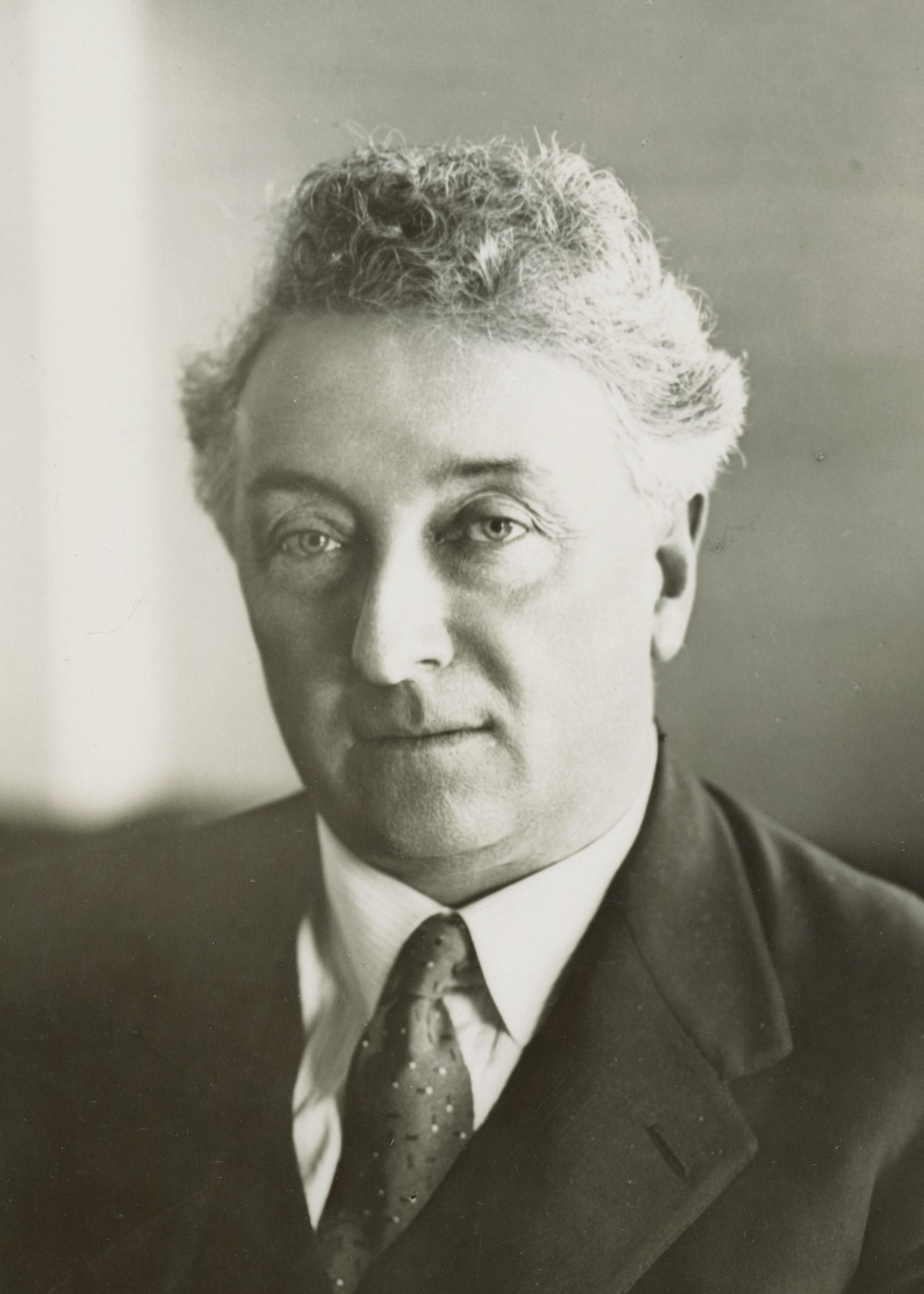
Joseph Lyons

- 14 February – James Webb, New South Wales politician (b. 1887)
- 9 March – Edwin Greenslade Murphy, journalist and poet (b. 1866)
- 11 March – William Miller, athlete (born in the United Kingdom and died in the United States) (b. 1846)
- 7 April – Joseph Lyons, 10th Prime Minister of Australia and 26th Premier of Tasmania (b. 1879)
- 25 April – Sir Charles Powers, High Court judge (b. 1853)
- 18 May – Francis Clarke, New South Wales politician (b. 1857)
- 10 June – Albert Ogilvie, 28th Premier of Tasmania (b. 1890)
- 13 June – Arthur Coningham, cricketer (b. 1863)
- 6 August – James MacCallum Smith, Western Australian politician (born in the United Kingdom) (b. 1868)
- 11 August – Margaret Windeyer, librarian and feminist (b. 1866)
- 30 August – Edward Sydney Simpson, mineralogist and geochemist (b. 1875)
- 3 October – Henry Augustus Ellis, physician and federalist (born in Ireland and died in the United Kingdom) (b. 1861)
- 22 October – Sir Langdon Bonython, South Australian politician and journalist (born in the United Kingdom) (b. 1848)
- 15 November – William Hill, Victorian politician (b. 1866)
- 6 December – Sir Ernest Scott, historian (born in the United Kingdom) (b. 1867)

== See also ==
- List of Australian films of the 1930s
