= Edward Magrath =

Edward Magrath may refer to:

- Edward Magrath (politician) (1881–1961), Australian politician
- Ted Magrath (born 1939), Australian rugby union player
