= 1942 in Australia =

- Monarch: George VI
- Governor-General: Alexander Hore-Ruthven, 1st Earl of Gowrie
- Prime minister: John Curtin
- Population: 7,180,736

The following lists events that happened during 1942 in Australia.

- Decades: 1920s; 1930s; 1940s; 1950s; 1960s
- See also: 1942 in Australian literature; Other events of 1942; Timeline of Australian history

== Population ==
Australia had a population of 7,180,736 people consisting of 3,613,725 men and 3,567,011 women, likely excluding indigenous Australians.

== Incumbents ==
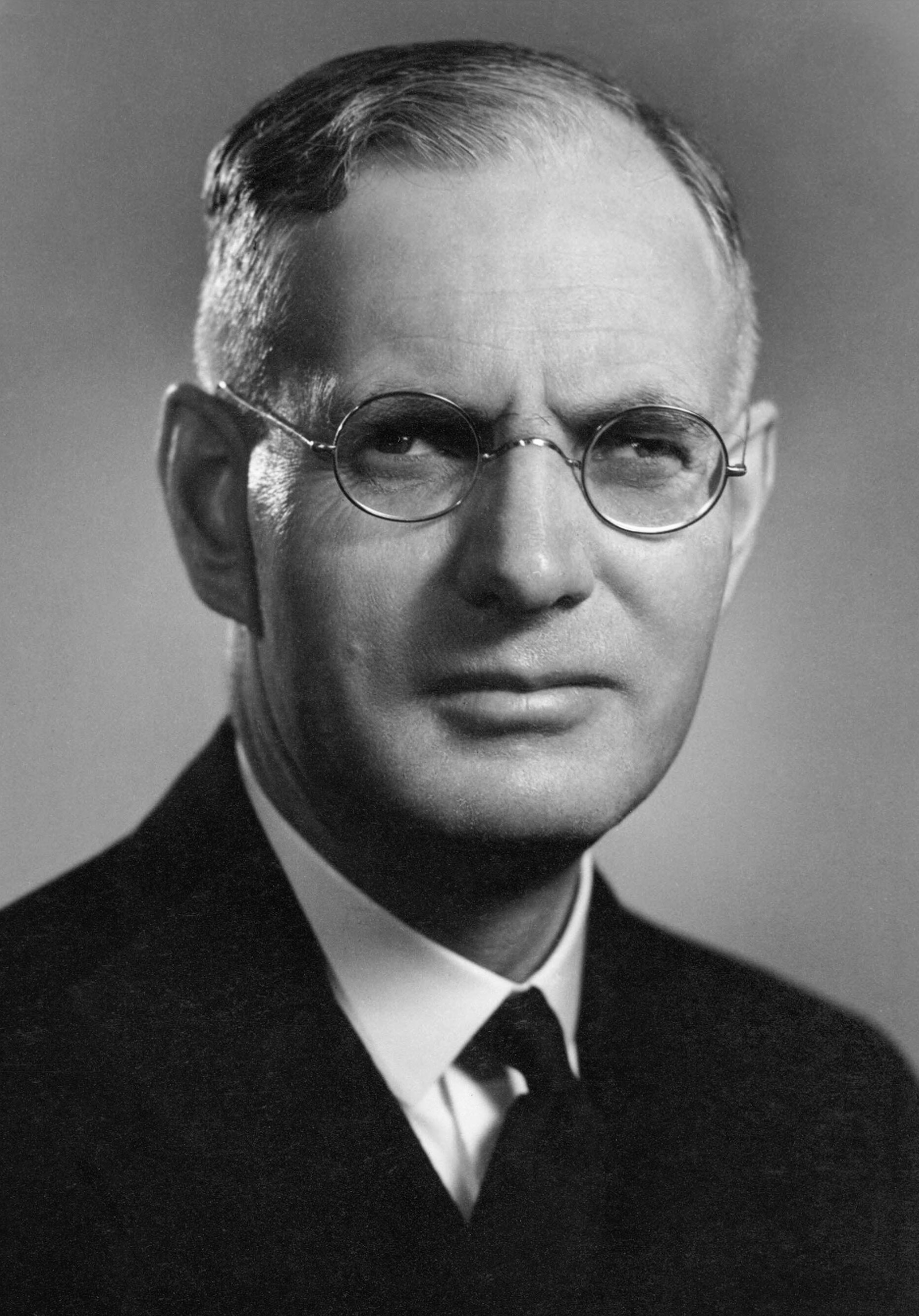
John Curtin

- Monarch – George VI
- Governor-General – Alexander Hore-Ruthven, 1st Baron Gowrie
- Prime Minister – John Curtin
- Chief Justice – Sir John Latham

=== State Premiers ===
- Premier of New South Wales – William McKell
- Premier of Queensland – William Forgan Smith (until 16 September), then Frank Cooper
- Premier of South Australia – Thomas Playford
- Premier of Tasmania – Robert Cosgrove
- Premier of Victoria – Albert Dunstan
- Premier of Western Australia – John Willcock

=== State Governors ===
- Governor of New South Wales – John Loder, 2nd Baron Wakehurst
- Governor of Queensland – Sir Leslie Orme Wilson
- Governor of South Australia – Sir Malcolm Barclay-Harvey
- Governor of Tasmania – Sir Ernest Clark
- Governor of Victoria – Sir Winston Dugan
- Governor of Western Australia – none appointed

== Events ==
- 15 February – Singapore falls to the Japanese, with approximately 15,000 Australian troops taken prisoner.
- 16 February - The Bangka Island massacre takes place.
- 19 February – Darwin is bombed by Japanese forces for the first time. At least 243 persons are killed.
- 1 March – The cruiser HMAS Perth is torpedoed by Japanese destroyers in the Battle of Sunda Strait, sinking with the loss of 350 crew and three civilians.
- 3 March – 88 Allied civilians and military personnel were killed and 22 aircraft were lost when Japanese Zero fighters strafed Broome.
- 20 March – At Terowie, South Australia, American General Douglas MacArthur makes his famous speech which included the words "I came out of Bataan and I shall return."
- 4 May – The Battle of the Coral Sea begins.
- 19 May – The prototype CAC Boomerang, an Australian designed and built fighter aircraft, takes to the air for the first time.
- 22 May – American soldier Eddie Leonski is arrested and charged for the "Brownout Murders" of three women.
- 22–23 May - Townsville mutiny - A mutiny by African American servicemen from the 96th Battalion, US Army Corps of Engineers, United States Army while serving in Townsville.
- 31 May – During an attack on Sydney Harbour, a Japanese midget submarine sinks the converted Sydney ferry, HMAS Kuttabul, killing 21.
- 7 June – The Income Tax (War-time Arrangements) Act 1942 is enacted, transferring the power to levy personal income tax from the states to the federal government.
- 8 June – Japanese midget submarines shell Sydney and Newcastle.
- 6 July – Elements of the Australian 9th Division arrive in El Alamein. The Division subsequently takes part in the First and Second Battle of El Alamein.
- 21 July - Australia Fights Japan in Kokoda Trail
- 9 October - Australia adopts sections 2 to 6 of the Statute of Westminster 1931 effectively ending British dominion
- 30 October – Construction begins on the Burma Railway, begun by 15,000 Australian prisoners-of-war captured by the Japanese after the fall of Singapore.
- 16 November - Japan retreats from Kokoda Trail with Australia being the Victor
- 26 November – A violent brawl breaks out in Brisbane between United States military personnel and Australian servicemen and civilians, in what becomes known as the "Battle of Brisbane". One Australian soldier is shot dead.
- 1 December – HMAS Armidale, a corvette of the Royal Australian Navy, is sunk by Japanese with the loss of 100 men.

== Arts and literature ==
- The Pea-Pickers by Eve Langley is first published
- William Dargie wins the Archibald Prize with his portrait of James Heather Gordon VC

== Sport ==
- 12 September – Canterbury-Bankstown win the 1942 NSWRFL season, defeating St. George 11–9. Western Suburbs finish in last place, claiming the wooden spoon.
- Colonus wins the Melbourne Cup

== Births ==
- 14 January – Ian Brayshaw, cricketer and footballer
- 17 January – Ita Buttrose, journalist
- 1 February – David Sincock, cricketer
- 24 February
  - Colin Bond, racing driver
  - David Williamson, playwright
- 28 February – Bruce Baird, politician (died 2026)
- 13 March – George Negus, journalist (died 2024)
- 8 May – Peter Corris, academic historian, journalist and novelist (died 2018)
- 9 May – Brendon Hackwill, Australian rules football player and basketball player (died 1995)
- 13 May – Richard Butler, diplomat and Governor of Tasmania (2003–2004)
- 15 May – Doug Lowe, Premier of Tasmania (1977–1981)
- 21 May – John Konrads, swimmer (died 2021)
- 2 June – Mike Ahern, Premier of Queensland (1987–1989) (died 2023)
- 10 June – Les Carlyon, writer and newspaper editor (died 2019)
- 18 June –
  - Nick Tate, actor
  - Ian Tuxworth, Chief Minister of the Northern Territory (died 2020)
- 29 June – Mike Willesee, television journalist (died 2019)
- 30 June – Gerry Hand, politician (died 2023)
- 2 July – John Farrington, long-distance runner (died 2025)
- 7 July – Carmen Duncan, actress (died 2019)
- 12 July – Billy Smith, rugby league footballer
- 16 July – Margaret Court, tennis player
- 23 July – Sallyanne Atkinson, Lord Mayor of Brisbane
- 25 July – Bruce Woodley, musician
- 28 July – John Sattler, rugby league footballer (died 2023)
- 10 October – Susan Ryan, politician and age discrimination commissioner (died 2020)
- 19 October – Bronwyn Bishop, politician
- 24 October – Ian Collins, footballer and coach
- 5 November – Percy Hobson, high jumper (died 2022)
- 17 November – Derek Clayton, long-distance runner
- 30 November – Michael Ah Matt, basketball player (died 1984)
- 23 December – Quentin Bryce, Governor of Queensland (2003–2008), Governor-General of Australia (2008–2014)
- 20 December – Roger Woodward, pianist

== Deaths ==
- 22 February – Frank Wilmot, poet (b. 1881)
- 11 March – Reginald Stoneham, composer and publisher (b. 1879)
- 27 April – Julian Ashton, artist and teacher (born in the United Kingdom) (b. 1851)
- 12 May – Sir Harold Crisp, 7th Chief Justice of Tasmania (b. 1874)
- 22 May – Jean Beadle, suffragette and social worker (b. 1868)
- 8 August – James Hume Cook, Victorian politician (born in New Zealand) (b. 1866)
- 3 September – Sir Mungo William MacCallum, scholar (born in the United Kingdom) (b. 1854)

== See also ==
- List of Australian films of the 1940s
