= 1941 in Australia =

- Monarch: George VI
- Governor-General: Alexander Hore-Ruthven, 1st Earl of Gowrie
- Prime minister: Robert Menzies, Arthur Fadden, John Curtin
- Population: 7,109,898
- Elections: QLD, NSW, SA, TAS

The following lists events that happened during 1941 in Australia.

- Decades: 1920s; 1930s; 1940s; 1950s; 1960s
- See also: 1941 in Australian literature; Other events of 1941; Timeline of Australian history

== Incumbents ==
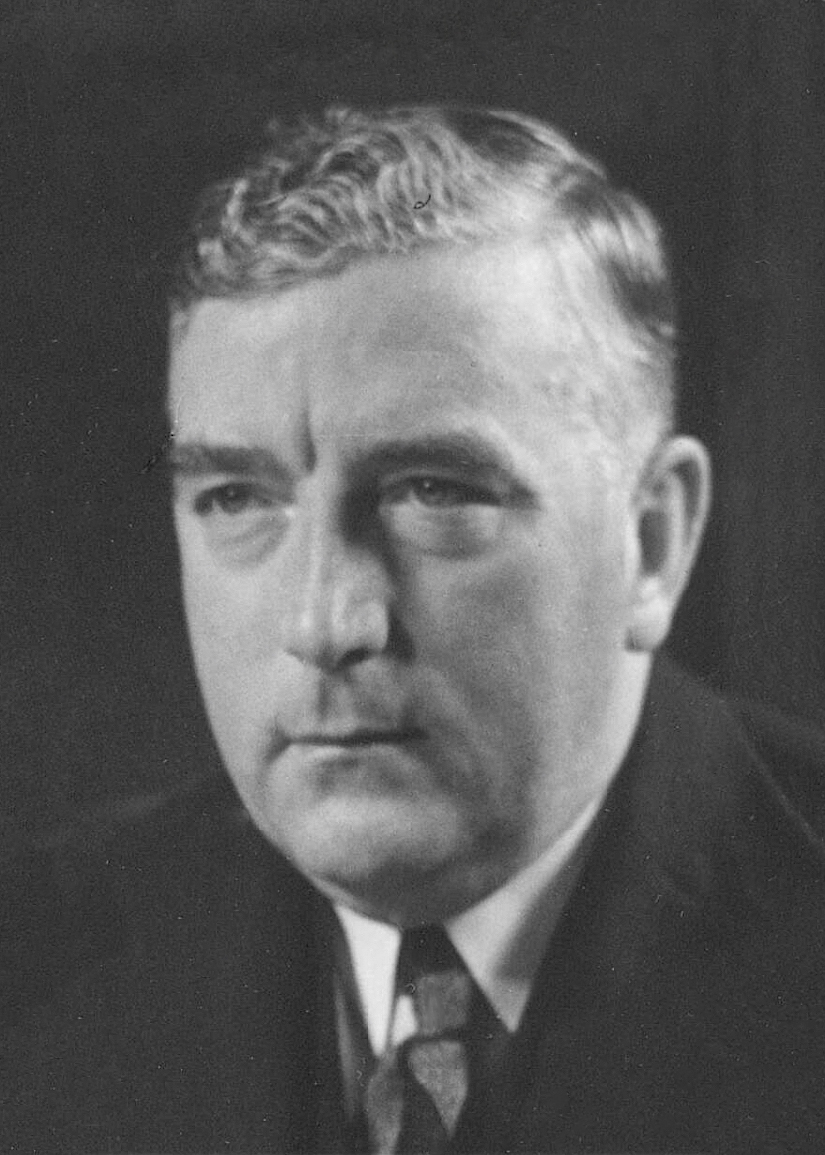
Robert Menzies

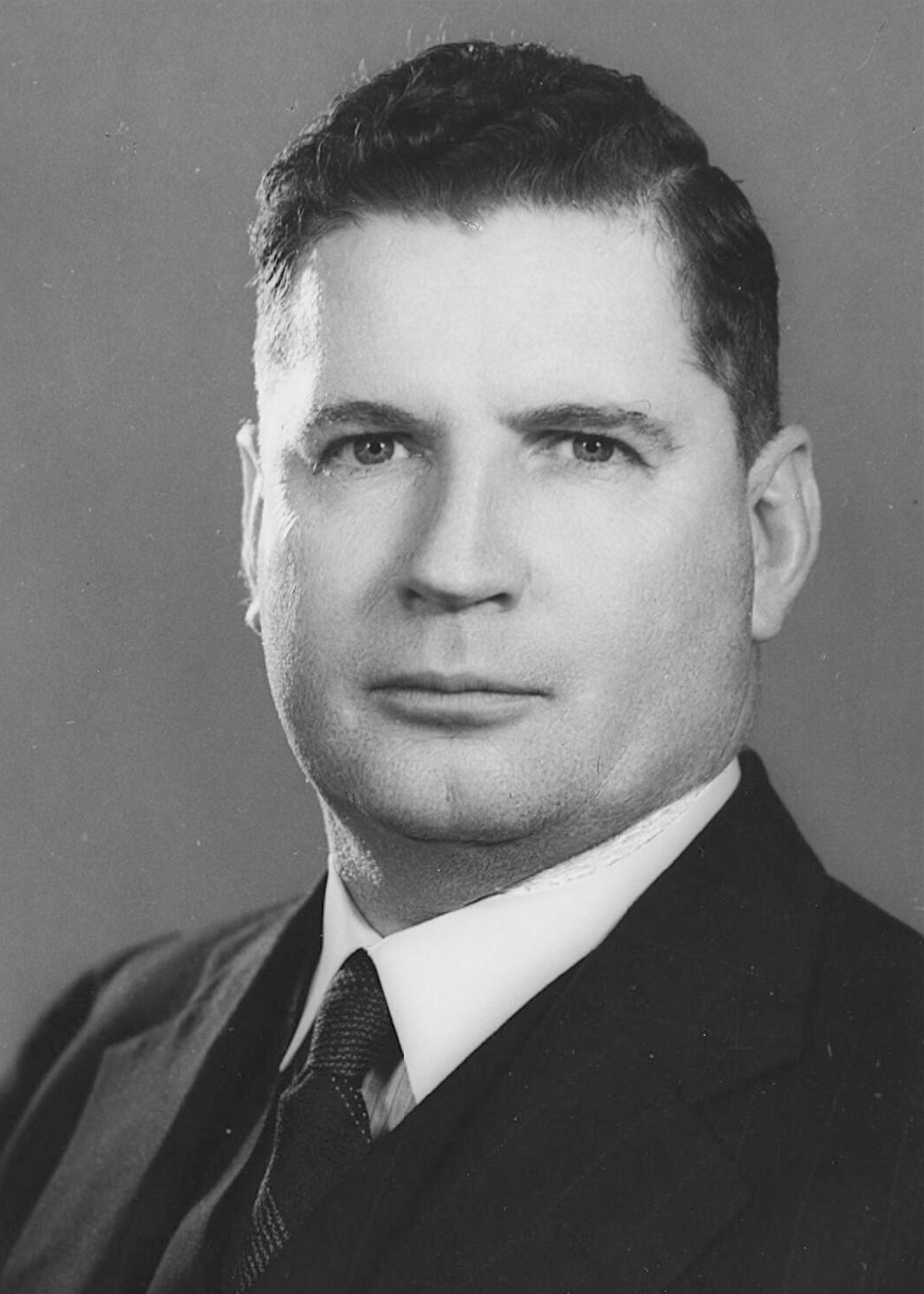
Arthur Fadden

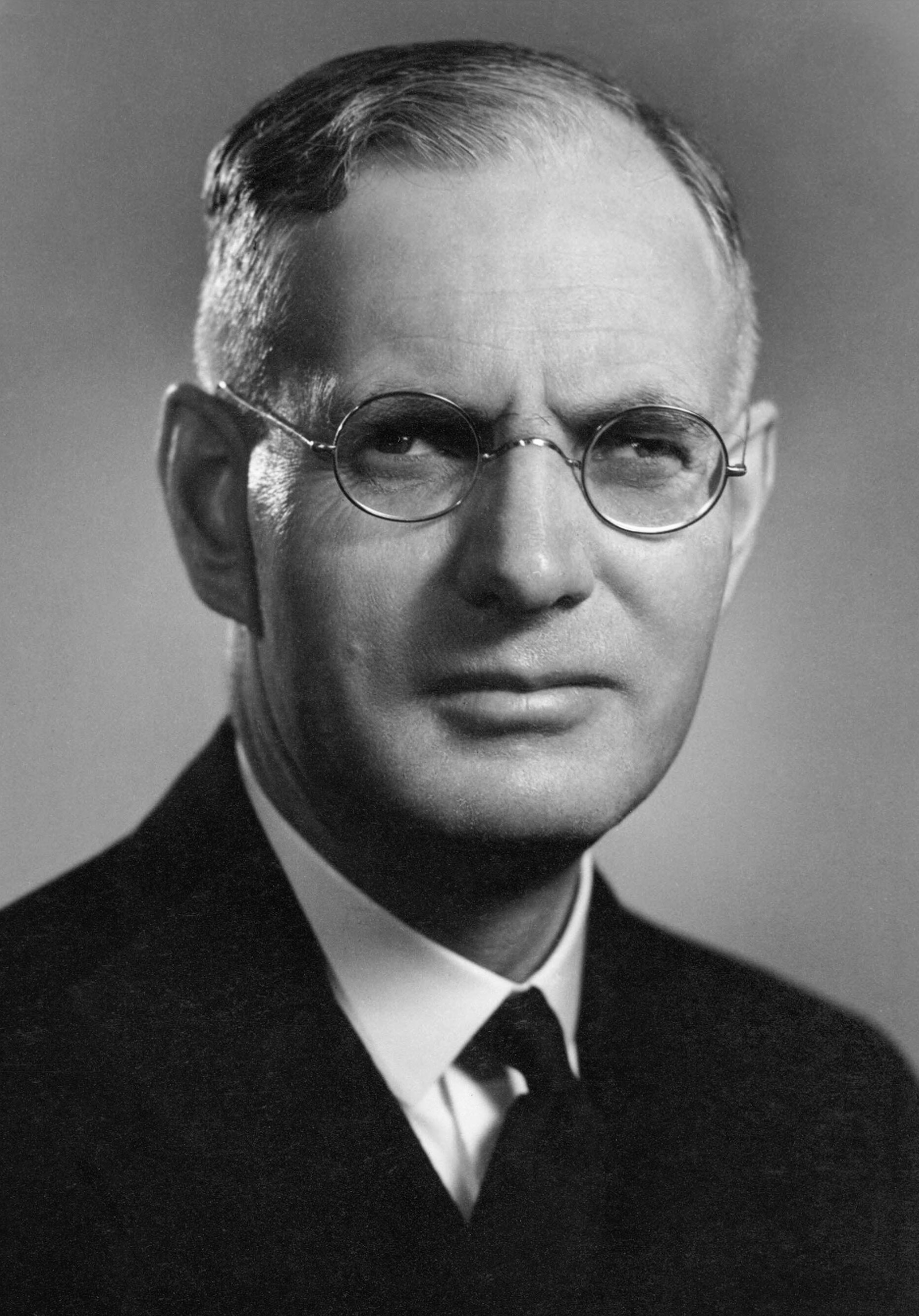
John Curtin

- Monarch – George VI
- Governor-General – Alexander Hore-Ruthven, 1st Baron Gowrie
- Prime Minister – Robert Menzies (until 28 August), then Arthur Fadden (until 7 October), then John Curtin
- Chief Justice – Sir John Latham

=== State Premiers ===
- Premier of New South Wales – Alexander Mair (until 16 May), then William McKell
- Premier of Queensland – William Forgan Smith
- Premier of South Australia – Thomas Playford
- Premier of Tasmania – Robert Cosgrove
- Premier of Victoria – Albert Dunstan
- Premier of Western Australia – John Willcock

=== State Governors ===
- Governor of New South Wales – John Loder, 2nd Baron Wakehurst
- Governor of Queensland – Sir Leslie Orme Wilson
- Governor of South Australia – Sir Malcolm Barclay-Harvey
- Governor of Tasmania – Sir Ernest Clark
- Governor of Victoria – Sir Winston Dugan
- Governor of Western Australia – none appointed

== Events ==
- 25 March – The Women's Auxiliary Australian Air Force (WAAAF) is formed.
- 31 March – The Siege of Tobruk begins.
- 7 April – The Women's Royal Australian Naval Service (WRANS) is formed.
- 10 May – A general election is held in New South Wales. The ALP led by William McKell defeats the incumbent United Australia Party and Premier Alexander Mair.
- 12 May – The Daily Mirror newspaper is first published in Sydney.
- 30 June – HMAS Waterhen sinks off Libya – the first Australian naval vessel lost in the war.
- 3 October – Prime Minister Arthur Fadden resigns following the rejection of his budget by two independent MPs.
- 7 October – John Curtin is sworn in as Prime Minister after Arthur Fadden's government loses majority support in the House of Representatives.
- 11 November – The Australian War Memorial is opened in Canberra.
- 19 November – The light cruiser HMAS Sydney engages the German auxiliary cruiser Kormoran in an hour-long battle off the coast of Western Australia. Both ships are sunk, the Sydney going down with 645 crew.
- 9 December – Australia declares war on Japan, and the Axis powers of Finland, Hungary and Romania.
- 13 December – A general election is held in Tasmania. The Labor Party led by Robert Cosgrove is returned to power.

== Arts and literature ==
- William Dargie wins the Archibald Prize with his portrait of Sir James Elder, KBE
- The Timeless Land by Eleanor Dark is published.

== Sport ==
- 30 August – St. George win the 1941 NSWRFL season for their first premiership after the club's founding in 1920, defeating Eastern Suburbs 31–14. North Sydney finish in last place, claiming the wooden spoon.
- 27 September – Melbourne wins the 45th VFL Premiership, defeating Essendon 19.13 (127) to 13.20 (98).
- 4 November – Skipton wins the Melbourne Cup.
- Velocity wins the Caulfield Cup
- Beau Vite wins the Cox Plate
- The Sheffield Shield is not contested due to war

== Births ==
- 3 January – Roger Rogerson, detective and convicted murderer (died 2024)
- 14 January – Peter Ingham, Roman Catholic bishop (died 2024)
- 23 January – Jock R. Anderson, economist and academic
- 29 January – Maggie Kirkpatrick, actress
- 4 February – Russell Cooper, Premier of Queensland (1989)
- 24 February – Clive Doyle, Australian-born Branch Davidian (died 2022)
- 2 March – John Cornell, film producer (died 2021)
- 11 March – Kim Santow, NSW Supreme Court judge (died 2008)
- 29 March – Michael Thornhill, film producer, screenwriter and film director (died 2022)
- 31 March – Faith Leech, swimmer (died 2013)
- 10 April – Wendy Fatin, politician
- 13 April – Alan Jones, radio personality
- 17 April – Bill Landeryou, politician (died 2019)
- 24 April – John Williams, classical guitarist
- 6 May – Peter Corrigan, architect (died 2016)
- 11 May – Ian Redpath, cricketer (died 2024)
- 18 May – Lobby Loyde, rock music guitarist (died 2007)
- 30 May – Kevin Coombs, Paralympic athlete (died 2023)
- 31 May – Julian Croft, poet
- 4 June – Kenneth G. Ross, playwright
- 8 June – George Pell, cardinal (died 2023)
- 23 June – Margaret Hamilton, publisher and author (died 2022)
- 24 June – Graham McKenzie, cricketer
- 25 June – Kenneth Walker, cricketer
- 28 June – Harry Quick, politician (died 2024)
- 1 July
  - Alf Duval, rower
  - Denis Michael Rohan, Australian citizen who, on 21 August 1969, set fire to the pulpit of the Al-Aqsa Mosque, in Jerusalem (died 1995)
- 3 July – Merv Cross, orthopaedic surgeon and rugby league player (died 2023)
- 9 July – Jan Lehane, tennis player
- 13 July – Grahame Corling, cricketer
- 21 July – Ron Corry, football (soccer) player, coach
- 31 July – Heather McKay, squash player
- 28 August – Tony Barry, actor (died 2022)
- 1 September – Graeme Langlands, rugby league footballer and coach (died 2018)
- 22 September – Murray Bail, writer
- 27 September – Gay Kayler, country music singer
- 3 October – John Elliott, businessman (died 2021)
- 5 October – Earle Bailey, politician (died 2023)
- 14 October – David Kemp, politician
- 16 October – Genevieve Lloyd, philosopher and feminist
- 25 October – Helen Reddy, singer (died 2020)
- 28 October – Fred Chaney, WA politician
- 7 November – Willi Sawall, race walker
- 16 November – Max Gillies, actor
- 13 December – Dixie Willis, middle distance runner
- 15 December – Richard Neville, writer (died 2016)

== Deaths ==
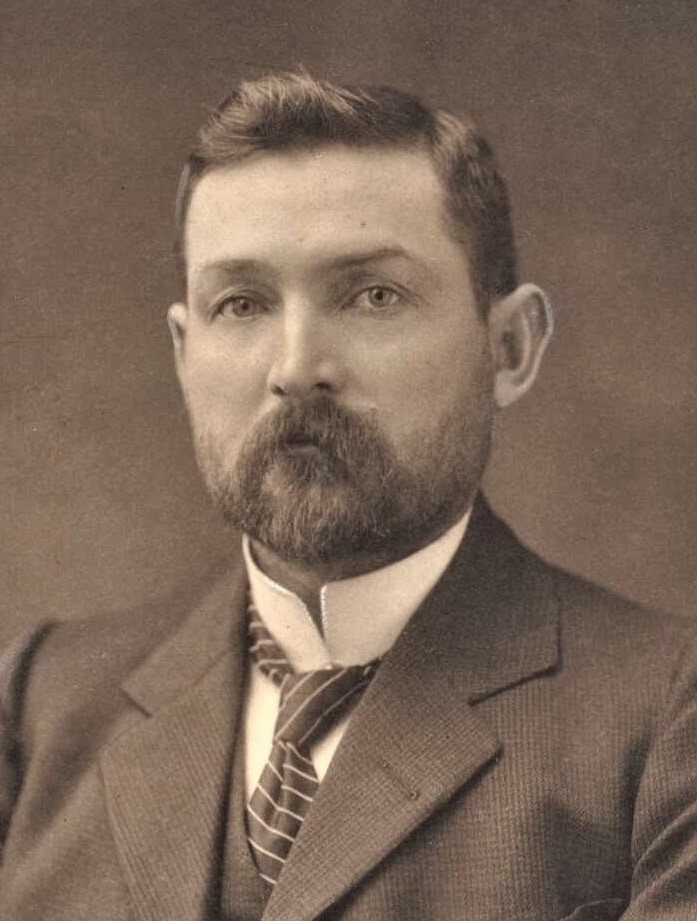
Chris Watson

- 20 January – Raimund Pechotsch, musical composer (born in Austria-Hungary) (b. 1864)
- 5 February – Banjo Paterson, bush poet, journalist and author (b. 1864)
- 18 March – Harry Boan, Western Australian politician and businessman (b. 1860)
- 1 April – Jack Chamberlain, cricketer (b. 1884)
- 12 April – James Boyd, Victorian politician (born in the United Kingdom) (b. 1867)
- 15 April – Emily Pelloe, botanical illustrator (b. 1878)
- 4 May – Chris McKivat, Olympic rugby union and league player (b. 1880)
- 8 May – Alexander Hay, New South Wales politician (born in New Zealand) (b. 1865)
- 15 June – John Lynch, New South Wales politician (b. 1862)
- 24 June – Sir Francis Anderson, philosopher (born in the United Kingdom) (b. 1858)
- 1 July – Francis Birtles, adventurer (b. 1881)
- 7 July – Randolph Bedford, Queensland politician and writer (b. 1868)
- 27 July – James Ronald, Victorian politician (born in the United Kingdom) (b. 1861)
- 31 July – Ron Barassi Sr., Australian rules footballer (Melbourne) and soldier (died in Libya) (b. 1913)
- 1 August – James Drake, Queensland politician (born in the United Kingdom) (b. 1850)
- 23 August – Jack O'Connor, cricketer (b. 1875)
- 30 August – Gregan McMahon, actor and theatrical producer (b. 1874)
- 31 August – Sir Thomas Bavin, 24th Premier of New South Wales (born in New Zealand) (b. 1874)
- 1 September – Millice Culpin, Queensland politician (born in the United Kingdom) (b. 1846)
- 5 September – George Marchant, soft drink manufacturer and philanthropist (born in the United Kingdom) (b. 1857)
- 1 October – Sir John Longstaff, artist (b. 1861)
- 18 November – Chris Watson, 3rd Prime Minister of Australia (born in Chile) (b. 1867)
- 19 November – Joseph Burnett, naval captain (b. 1899)
- 28 November - Elwyn Roy King, fighter ace and military officer (b. 1894)
- 22 December – Cyril Cameron, Tasmanian politician and soldier (b. 1857)

== See also ==
- List of Australian films of the 1940s
