= 1940 in Australia =

- Monarch: George VI
- Governor-General: Alexander Hore-Ruthven, 1st Earl of Gowrie
- Prime minister: Robert Menzies
- Population: 7,039,490
- Elections: Federal, VIC

- Decades: 1920s; 1930s; 1940s; 1950s; 1960s
- See also: 1940 in Australian literature; Other events of 1940; Federal election; Timeline of Australian history

The following lists events that happened during 1940 in Australia.

== Incumbents ==
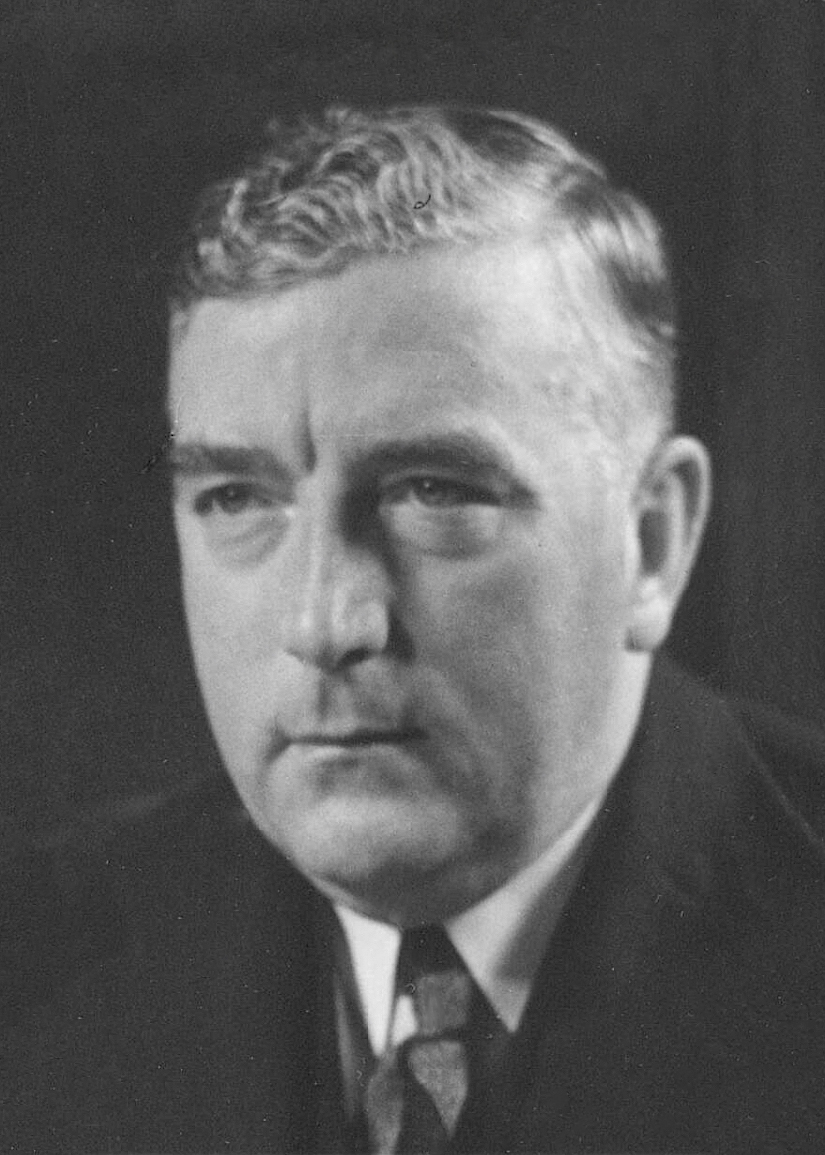
Robert Menzies

- Monarch – George VI
- Governor-General – Alexander Hore-Ruthven, 1st Baron Gowrie
- Prime Minister – Robert Menzies
- Chief Justice – Sir John Latham

=== State Governors ===
- Governor of New South Wales – John Loder, 2nd Baron Wakehurst
- Governor of Queensland – Sir Leslie Orme Wilson
- Governor of South Australia – Sir Malcolm Barclay-Harvey
- Governor of Tasmania – Sir Ernest Clark
- Governor of Victoria – Sir Winston Dugan
- Governor of Western Australia – none appointed

== Events ==
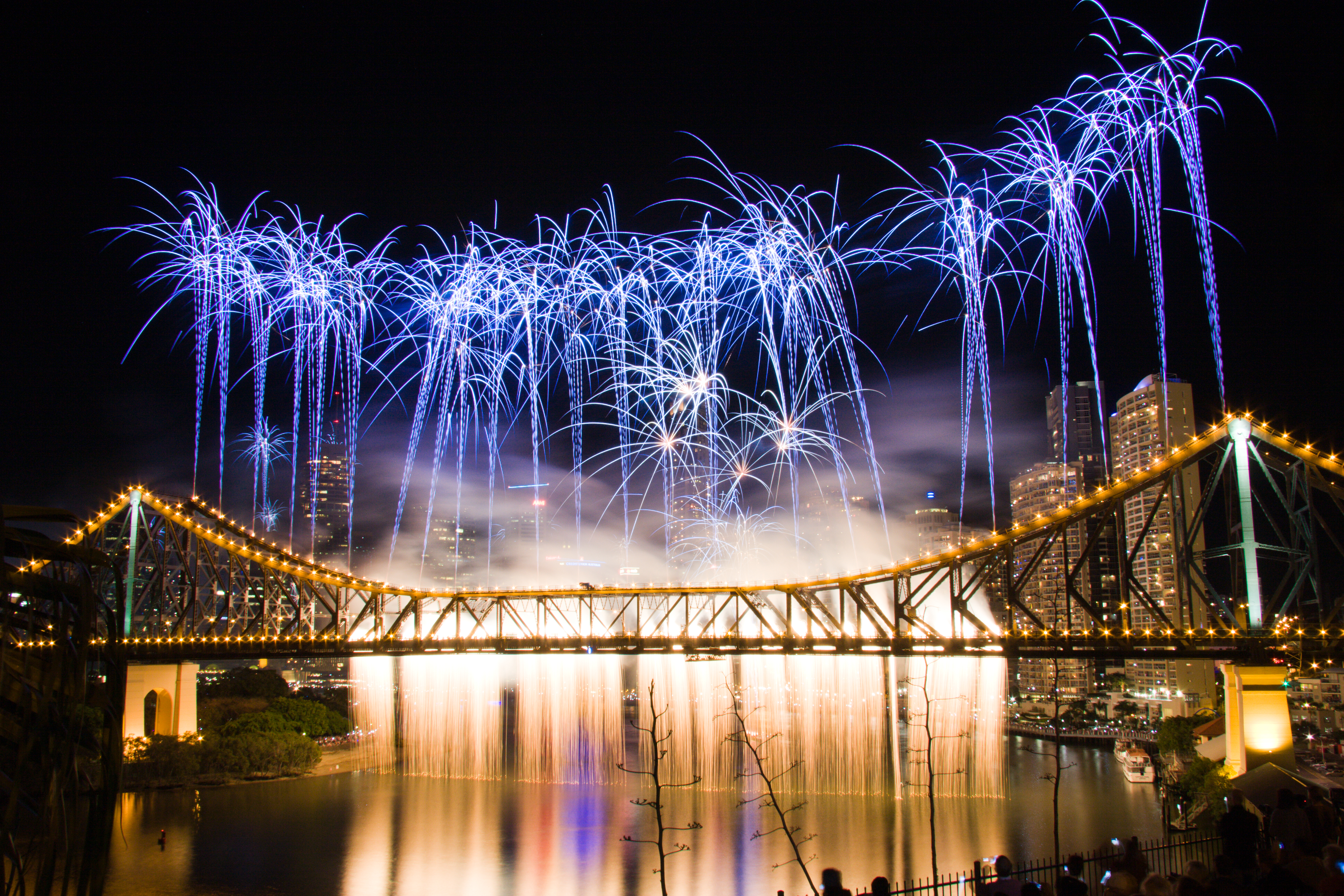
Story Bridge (built 1940), Brisbane in 2009

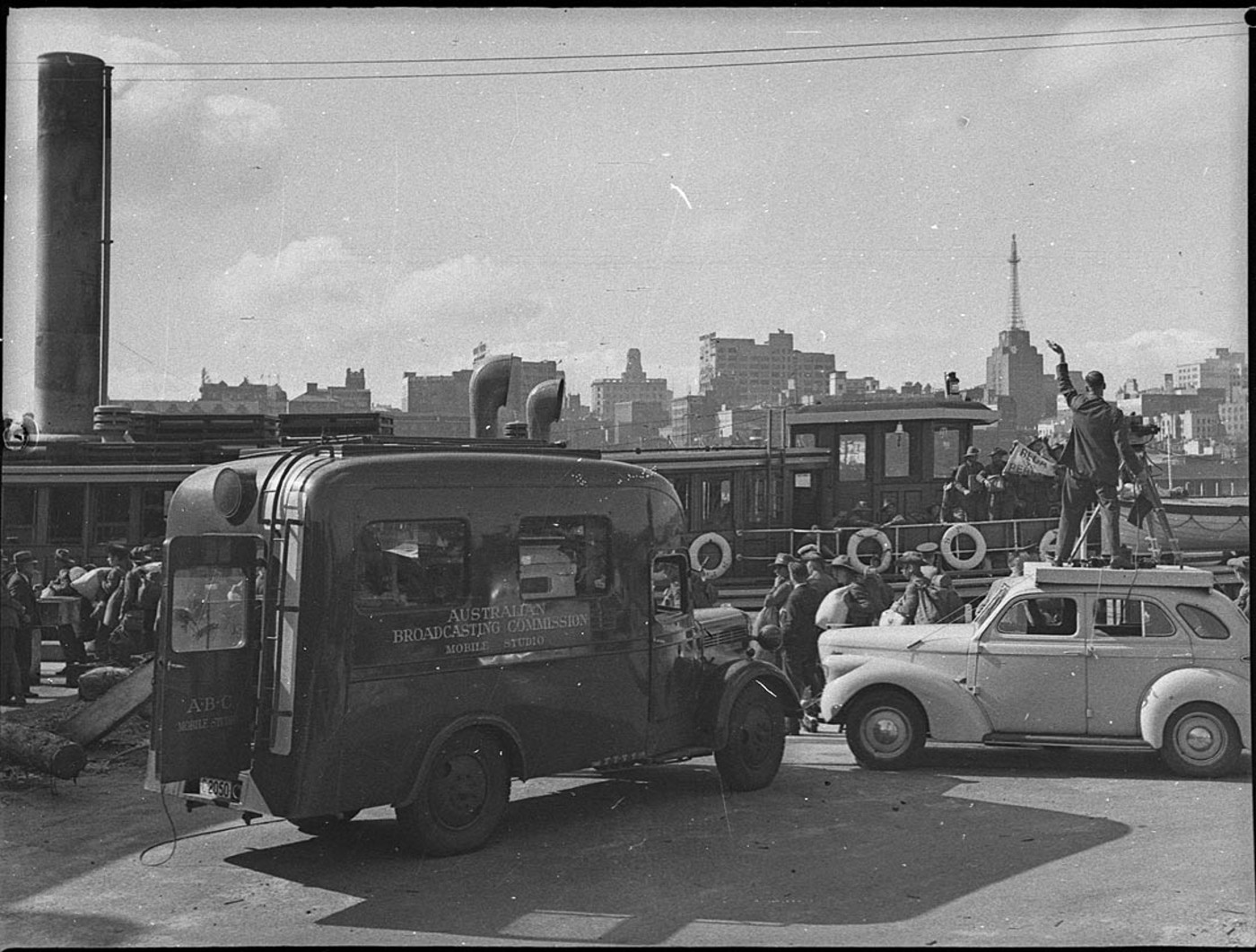
A.B.C. truck recording soldiers off to war, Darling Harbour, May 1940

- 28 February – The Australian 7th Division is formed.
- 16 March – A state election is held in Victoria. The Country Party led by Albert Dunstan is returned to government.
- 14 June – The Volunteer Defence Corps is formed, a militia force based on the British Home Guard.
- 6 July – The Story Bridge is opened in Brisbane.
- 19 July – The Australian cruiser HMAS Sydney takes part in the sinking of the Italian cruiser Bartolomeo Colleoni
- 1 August – The first of sixty Bathurst-class corvettes, HMAS Bathurst, is launched in Sydney.
- 13 August – An RAAF Lockheed Hudson crashes near Canberra, killing three members of Cabinet and the Chief of the General Staff.
- 3 September – The heavy cruiser HMAS Australia takes part in Operation Menace off Dakar.
- 6 September – The British prison ship HMT Dunera docks in Sydney, carrying refugees and prisoners of war considered a danger to British security, for internment in Hay and Tatura.
- 19 September – HMAS Adelaide reaches Nouméa to support the installation of a Free French governor in the 1940 New Caledonia coup d'état.
- 21 September – The 1940 federal election results in a hung parliament, with Prime Minister Robert Menzies remaining in office at the head of a minority government.
- 16 October – Country Party leader Archie Cameron resigns and is succeeded by Arthur Fadden as acting leader.
- 26 October – Double-decker buses replace the last cable trams in Melbourne.

== Arts and literature ==
- Max Meldrum wins the Archibald Prize with his portrait of Dr J Forbes McKenzie
- The Man Who Loved Children by Christina Stead is published.
- The Magic Basket a musical play for children by Alfred Wheeler is published

== Film ==
- Forty Thousand Horsemen, directed by Charles Chauvel and starring Chips Rafferty, is released

== Sport ==
- Old Rowley wins the Melbourne Cup
- Beaulivre wins the Caulfield Cup
- Beau Vite wins the Cox Plate
- New South Wales wins the Sheffield Shield
- Eastern Suburbs win the 1940 NSWRFL season, defeating Canterbury-Bankstown 24–14. Western Suburbs finish in last place, claiming the wooden spoon.

Melbourne Demons win the VFL premiership defeating Richmond Tigers in front of 70330 fans. Jack Titus kicks his 100th goal of the season with his last kick in the Grand Final.

== Births ==
- 5 January – Athol Guy, musician
- 19 January – Paul Calvert, Liberal Senator for Tasmania
- 17 February – Marilyn Jones, ballet dancer
- 22 February – Neil Brown, politician
- 24 February – Ian Shelton, Australian rules football player (died 2021)
- 27 February – Bill Hunter, actor (died 2011)
- 1 March – Robin Gray, Premier of Tasmania (1982–1989)
- 5 March – Ken Irvine, rugby league player (died 1990)
- 8 March – Don Barker, actor
- 19 March – Andrew Taylor, poet
- 20 March – Paul Neville, politician (died 2019)
- 12 April – Jack Hibberd, playwright (died 2024)
- 16 April – Marion Halligan, writer (died 2024)
- 24 April – Trevor Kent, actor (died 1989)
- 26 April – Ian Geoghegan, race car driver (died 2003)
- 15 June – Ken Fletcher, tennis player (died 2006)
- 17 June – Alan Murray, Australian golfer (died 2019)
- 23 June – Diana Trask, country music singer
- 25 June – Judy Amoore, athlete
- 29 June – Ken Done, artist
- 10 July – Keith Stackpole, cricketer (died 2025)
- 3 August – Judith Troeth, Liberal Senator for Victoria
- 16 August – Bruce Beresford, film director
- 18 August – Jan Owen, poet
- 31 August – Jack Thompson, actor
- 8 September – Robin Miller, aviator and nurse (died 1975)
- 9 September – Hugh Morgan, businessman
- 13 September – Kerry Stokes, chairman of the Seven Network
- 15 September – Allan Andrews, NSW politician
- 21 September – John Pochee, jazz musician (died 2022)
- 3 October – Diana Warnock, radio broadcaster and politician
- 4 October – Ian Kiernan, yachtsman and environmentalist, 1994 Australian of the Year (died 2018)
- 5 October – Bob Cowper, cricketer (died 2025)
- 15 October – Peter C. Doherty, medical researcher, Nobel Prize recipient
- 19 October – Ian Causley, politician (died 2020)
- 21 October – Peter Arnison, Governor of Queensland (1997–2003)
- 1 November – John Bell, actor and theatre director
- 2 November – MaryAnn Bin-Sallik, academic and Djaru elder (died 2026)
- 4 November – John Sanderson, Governor of Western Australia (2000–2005)
- 12 November – John Dowd, NSW politician
- 9 December – Ron Boswell, politician (died 2026)
- 19 December – Jane Mathews, judge (died 2019)

== Deaths ==
- 3 February – John Henry Michell, mathematician (b. 1863)
- 5 February – Bill Wilks, New South Wales politician (b. 1863)
- 8 March – Michael Kelly, Catholic archbishop (b. 1850)
- 16 April – Herbert James Carter, entomologist (b. 1858)
- 20 April – Sir Ernest Gaunt, naval admiral (b. 1865)
- 22 June – Monty Noble, cricketer (b. 1873)
- 23 June – Hugh Denis Macrossan, Queensland politician and judge (b. 1881)
- 6 July – Michael O'Connor, Western Australian politician (b. 1865)
- 22 July – Sir George Fuller, 22nd Premier of New South Wales (b. 1861)
- 27 July – Bluey Wilkinson, speedway rider (b. 1911)
- 30 July
  - Arthur Merric Boyd, painter (b. 1862)
  - Archibald Watson, surgeon and professor of anatomy (b. 1849)
- 13 August
  - James Fairbairn, Victorian politician (b. 1897)
  - Henry Gullett, Victorian politician (b. 1878)
  - Geoffrey Street, Victorian politician (b. 1894)
  - Sir Brudenell White, 10th Chief of the General Staff (b. 1876)
- 9 September – Percy Abbott, New South Wales politician (b. 1869)
- 11 September – Issy Smith, soldier and Victoria Cross recipient (b. 1890)
- 22 September – Robert Blackwood, New South Wales politician (b. 1861)
- 2 October – Albert Green, Western Australian politician (b. 1869)
- 14 October – Helen de Guerry Simpson, novelist (b. 1897)
- 25 October – Thomas Waddell, 15th Premier of New South Wales (b. 1854)
- 31 October
  - Frank Anstey, Victorian politician (born in the United Kingdom) (b. 1865)
  - John Keating, Tasmanian politician (b. 1872)
- 2 November – Colin Rankin, Queensland politician and soldier (b. 1869)
- 3 November – James Fowler, Western Australian politician (born in the United Kingdom) (b. 1863)
- 23 November – Sir Stanley Argyle, 32nd Premier of Victoria (b. 1867)
- 11 December – Belle Golding, feminist, suffragist and labour activist (b. 1864)
- 20 December – Tom Foster, composer (b. 1870)

== See also ==
- List of Australian films of the 1940s
