= Brendon Hackwill =

Australian rules footballer

Personal information
- Full name: Brendon Alan Hackwill
- Born: 9 May 1942
- Died: 3 August 1995 (aged 53)
- Original team: West Preston
- Height: 193 cm (6 ft 4 in)
- Weight: 89 kg (196 lb)

Playing career^{1}
Years	Club	Games (Goals)
1965–66	Fitzroy	17 (5)
- ^{1} Playing statistics correct to the end of 1966.

Brendon Alan Hackwill (9 May 1942 – 3 August 1995) was an Australian sportsman who played Australian rules football for Fitzroy in the Victorian Football League (VFL) during the 1960s and also represented his country at basketball.

Hackwill was with Fitzroy in what was a bad era for the club and experienced just the solitary win from his 17 senior games. As a basketball player he had represented Australia at the 1964 Summer Olympics in Tokyo where they finished ninth out of the 16 competing nations. He appeared in nine games and scored 12 points in a win over Mexico.
