= Kevin Pay =

Australian rules footballer (1939–2020)

Personal information
- Full name: Kevin Pay
- Born: 1 November 1939; Kerang, Victoria
- Died: 29 June 2020 (aged 80); Inverell, New South Wales
- Original team: Kerang
- Height: 185 cm (6 ft 1 in)
- Weight: 86 kg (190 lb)

Playing career^{1}
Years	Club	Games (Goals)
1960–1962	Collingwood	19 (31)
- ^{1} Playing statistics correct to the end of 1962.

Kevin Pay (1 November 1939 – 29 June 2020) was an Australian rules footballer who played with Collingwood in the Victorian Football League (VFL).

Pay kicked all of his 31 career goals, playing as a full-forward, in the 1961 VFL season and the tally was enough to top Collingwood's goal-kicking. In just his third league game, against Footscray at Western Oval, he kicked a career best eight goals. After leaving Collingwood he played briefly with Sandringham.
