= Alan Hayes =

Australian rules footballer (1939–2019)

Personal information
- Full name: Alan Douglas Hayes
- Born: 24 May 1939
- Died: 30 January 2019 (aged 79)
- Original team: Hampton Rovers
- Height: 173 cm (5 ft 8 in)
- Weight: 80 kg (176 lb)
- Position: Centre

Playing career^{1}
Years	Club	Games (Goals)
1959–1962	Richmond	23 (10)
1964–1966	Central District	51 (14)
- ^{1} Playing statistics correct to the end of 1966.

Alan Douglas Hayes (24 May 1939 – 30 January 2019) was an Australian rules footballer who played for the Richmond Football Club in the Victorian Football League (VFL) and Central District Football Club in the South Australian Football League (SANFL).
