= Merv Cross =

Australian rugby league footballer and orthopaedic surgeon (1941–2023)

Merv Cross OAM
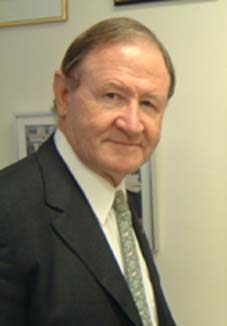
- Merv Cross in March 2006

Personal information
- Full name: Mervyn John Cross
- Born: 3 July 1941 Warialda, New South Wales, Australia
- Died: 25 August 2023 (aged 82) Sydney, New South Wales, Australia

Playing information
- Position: Forward
Club
Years	Team	Pld	T	G	FG	P
1960–61	South Sydney	23	0	0	0	0
1962	Eastern Suburbs	13	1	0	0	3
1963	North Sydney	9	1	0	0	3
	Total	45	2	0	0	6

Mervyn John Cross OAM (3 July 1941 – 25 August 2023) was an Australian rugby league footballer and orthopaedic surgeon. He played in Australia's major competition the New South Wales Rugby League (NSWRL) but Cross, a doctor, was better known for his achievements in the field of sports medicine as an orthopaedic surgeon.

== NSWRL career ==
Cross was known as a strong defensive forward who played for South Sydney (1960–61), Eastern Suburbs (1962) and North Sydney in the 1960s. At the end of the 1990s, Cross took up a position as an NRL board member.

== Orthopaedic surgery career ==
Cross was a pioneer in the field of knee surgery, entering orthopaedics in what turned out to be a golden age for the specialty. Cross trained in the 1970s in Georgia, USA and brought ideas on clinical practice back to Australia. He moved the North Sydney Orthopaedic and Sports Medicine Centre (NSOSMC) in 1983 to Crows Nest with Ken Crichton, Greg Craig and Ian Collier, after establishing it in North Sydney in the late 1970s.

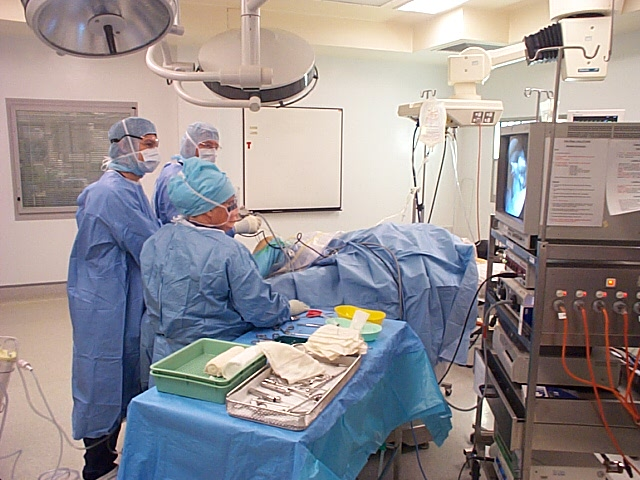
Merv Cross operating on a knee

Some of the ideas he brought to NSOSMC, which were revolutionary at the time, but have now become commonplace were:

- sub-specialization of orthopaedic surgeons into single joint areas. Cross only operated on the knee joint (from the late 1980s onwards) and directed referrals for other joint problems to colleagues in the same practice who sub-specialised in foot and ankle, hip, or shoulder
- a multi-disciplinary clinic where orthopaedic surgeons worked alongside physiotherapists, sports medicine physicians, sports radiologists, podiatrists and others
- that non-surgical sports medicine physicians should become an independent specialty in Australia and be the doctors who provided best-quality non-surgical sports injury management. Cross was appointed an inaugural honorary Fellow of the Australasian College of Sport and Exercise Physicians
- regular intake of visiting overseas Fellows, including Jonathan Webb

=== Knee surgery practice ===
His practice revolved around all of the common surgical knee procedures, including knee ACL reconstruction, patellofemoral reconstruction and knee replacement.

==== ACL reconstruction ====
Not only was Cross a knee sub-specialist, he also sub-specialized in performing patella tendon autograft ACL reconstruction. His preferred technique included using an anteromedial portal to drill the femoral tunnel (rather than a transtibial drilling technique).

==== Cross-bracing technique ====
After his surgical retirement in the early 2010s, Cross teamed up with his son Tom and others to trial a new non-surgical technique for managing ACL injuries where the knee is braced at 90 degrees for six weeks to promote healing in the anatomical position.

== Honours ==
Cross was awarded an Order of Australia Medal (OAM) for his revolutionary work in knee surgery. He was one of the inaugural Honorary Fellows of the Australasian College of Sport and Exercise Physicians.

Cross also worked as a director on the board of the National Rugby League until retiring in 2005.

Cross was a founding member of the Australian Knee Society. He was inducted into the American Orthopaedic Society for Sports Medicine Hall of Fame as an International member in 2007. He was appointed Director of Orthopaedics at the 2000 Summer Olympics.

Merv Cross died on 25 August 2023, at the age of 82.
