= Rik Kemp =

Australian cartoonist

Richard "Rik" Kemp (born 9 January 1939) is an Australian former cartoonist.

== Cartooning and illustration ==
Kemp began his passion for art at college in London. From the late 1950s he had several single frame cartoons published nationally as well as a comic strip titled "Bold Sir Bold". In 1981, Kemp emigrated to Australia and continued his cartoon career in Sydney. From 1981 to 1999, Kemp's cartoons could be seen in the Australasian Post, Woman's Day, Women's Weekly, People Magazine, The Bulletin and several others. He has illustrated books, designed colouring-in stencils for children, taught art classes and exhibited in galleries as well as being reviewed by the Macarthur Advertiser and the Macarthur Chronicle. Kemp retired in 2001 and now writes short stories and is working on his first novel.

== Family and personal life ==
Kemp was married to his first wife for 12 years and father to two children. His second wife, Janet, a school teacher from Wolverhampton, moved with him to Australia where they had a daughter Gillian and settled in Sydney. The couple now live in Queensland.
