= Ted Magrath =

- Born: Edward Magrath; 12 July 1939 Sydney

Rugby union career
- Position: wing
International career
Years	Team	Apps	(Points)
1961	Wallabies	3	(3)

Edward "Ted" Magrath (born 12 July 1939) was a rugby union player who represented Australia.

Magrath, a wing, was born in Sydney and claimed a total of 3 international rugby caps for Australia.
