= Tall Timbers (film) =

- Directed by: Ken G. Hall
- Written by: Frank Harvey
- Based on: story by Frank Hurley
- Produced by: Ken G. Hall
- Starring: Frank Leighton; Shirley Ann Richards
- Cinematography: George Heath
- Edited by: William Shepherd
- Music by: Lindley Evans
- Production company: Cinesound Productions
- Distributed by: British Empire Films (Aust); Paramount Pictures (UK)
- Release dates: 3 August 1937 (Australia); January 1938 (UK)
- Running time: 89 mins 75 mins (UK)
- Country: Australia
- Language: English
- Budget: £18,000

Tall Timbers is a 1937 action melodrama set in the timber industry directed by Ken G. Hall and starring Frank Leighton and Shirley Ann Richards. It has been called "easily one of the best Australian films of the 1930s, a tribute to the skill of Hall and the team at Cinesound."

== Synopsis ==
The film opens at Palm Beach, where life guard Jim Thornton, a former jackeroo, has just graduated from forestry school and is about to look for work in the timber industry. He saves a young woman, Joan Burbridge, from drowning. She is at the beach with Charles Blake, who wants to marry Joan and works for Joan's adopted father Stephen, a timber merchant.

Blake is secretly plotting with a treacherous businessman, Ludwig Rich, to take over Burbridge's company. They enlist one of Burbridge's employees, the foreman Darley, to help in their schemes.

Thornton asks Blake for a job but is turned down. Thornton approaches Stephen Burbridge, who gives him a job as ranger on one of his properties, Boundary Ridge. Burbirdge explains that Joan is his adopted daughter; her biological father was Lloyd, who is now dead.

Burbridge is in business competition with Rich. They make an agreement that if Burbridge cannot supply a million feet of timber in a specified time, he will sell his business to Rich. Rich plans to use Darley to help him in his plans. Blake admits he is secretly seeing Darley's sister Claire.

Thornton arrives at Boundary Ridge, where he befriends the workers, particularly Scotty, who tells him the history of the property, including the disappearance of Burbridge's wife when she was pregnant.

Darley plots sabotage of Burbridge's outfit with Blake in exchange for £200. Thornton impresses Burbridge with his skill, resulting in the owner replacing Darley with the newcomer. Thornley comes up with the idea of a timber drive to help win the competition against Rich.

Claire tells Joan she has been sleeping with Blake. Joan tricks Blake into admitting this is true by pretending to be Claire.

Scotty is driving a train which almost crashes around a wrecked bridge, but stops in time. An agitator tries to persuade Burbirdge's men to go to work for the Timber Trust but Thornton punches him out and inspires the men by talking about the timber drive. The men agree to follow Thornton, who awards them a ten percent bonus.

Burbridge faces various acts of sabotage and Thornton suggests it is Darley but cannot get proof. Blake refuses to marry Claire. When Darley gets upset, Blake says if he says anything, Blake will tell Burbridge about Darley's criminal activities. Claire tells her brother she has fallen pregnant.

Thorton and Joan get caught in a cottage in the rain. Blake visits and insults them and is kicked out. Joan and Thornton kiss.

Thorton reveals that he is Burbridge's long lost son, explaining his mother raised him in New Zealand, and has since passed. Thornton delayed revealing his identity until he could get the measure of what sort of man Burbridge was and says he admires his father. Joan tells Burbridge that she and Thorton are getting married.

Darley tells Blake his sister is pregnant. Blake refuses to marry Claire, wanting to pay her off, but Darley refuses. Darley shoots Blake dead.

The timber drive takes place. Joan and Thornton are almost trapped amongst the falling timber trees. The trees kill Darley, but Joan and Thornton manage to survive. Joan and Thornton get married.

== Cast ==
- Frank Leighton as Jim Thorton
- Shirley Ann Richards as Joan Burbridge
- Frank Harvey as Darley
- Campbell Copelin as Charles Blake
- Harvey Adams as Stephen Burbridge
- Aileen Britton as Claire Darley
- Ronald Whelan as Ludwig Rich
- Joe Valli as Scotty
- George Lloyd as Bill
- Letty Craydon as Rosanna
- W. Lane-Bayliff as Gavan
- Peter Dunstan as Robbie

== Production ==
=== Development ===
Cinesound Productions had intended to make a film of the timber industry since its formation in 1932. In 1935 they announced they were going to make a big screen adaptation of the William Hatfield story Big Timber as their next film after Thoroughbred (1936), starring an imported Hollywood actor. However Cinesound made Orphans of the Wilderness and It Isn't Done instead.

Eventually Hall decided not to adapt Hatfield's story, which the author later turned into a novel. He instead used an original story by Frank Hurley also set in the timber industry. This story was rewritten by Frank Harvey. Hall said the film:

All arose out of conversation I had with a friend of mine who had a property up on the north coast. He told me about a timber drive – how they got rid of a hillside of timber by half cutting the trees, then dropping the back row as "killers". This is usually how a film evolved with me. I got a climax first, then worked back. Almost always. And I think this is the thing to do. There were no bush fires or anything like that in The Squatter’s Daughter' in the stage play; except for the title, it was original. So Tall Timbers was an original story which hinged on this great timber drive.

Hall claims the script had no connection with the 1926 Australasian Films picture Tall Timber, which he had never seen although he said "Bert Cross, who was with me all this time right through the Cinesound period, often spoke of it. It was a film that had not done well, and which, unfortunately for Longford, had failed about the time he was looking to come back to Greater Union Theatres as the boss man."

It has been argued that the story has several similarities with The Squatter's Daughter, an earlier movie of Hall's. Filmink staged it has "the same feisty heroine, rugged hero with a past, nasty business rivals, tragic love subplot, comic servants, villainous servant, action finale, etc."

The two stars, Shirley Ann Richards and Frank Leighton, had both appeared in other Cinesound films, and Hall supported them with a strong support cast. Aileen Britton's part was created especially for her.

=== Shooting ===
The special effects were done by George Kenyon, who Hall hired from J. C. Williamson Ltd and went on to do effects for all of Cinesound's subsequent features. Two attempts were made to stage a timber drive on location at Gloucester but the drives failed to work. Kenyon then made a model of the timber slope in the studio and staged it in miniature, using cut up sponges as foliage and knocking them over with wires.

Frank Leighton was bitten by a spider during filming, causing him to fall ill for a number of weeks.

== Reception ==
The film was one of the last made at Cinesound when it was under the stewardship of Stuart F. Doyle, who resigned from the company in June 1937.

A "Tall Timbers Ball" was held to promote the film in Sydney with 1,200 attending, including Lloyd Hughes, the American star of Cinesound's next feature, Lovers and Luggers (1937). The film was successfully previewed to exhibitors in July 1937 and given a wide release in Australia. The world premiere was held in Brisbane at the Tivoli Theatre, where it broke a four-year-old attendance record previously held by On Our Selection. The movie was then seen by over 35,191 paid admissions at the Tivoli during its season there.

=== Box office ===
Hall later admitted he felt the resulting movie was "weak as hell" because of its melodramatic storyline, although he was proud of the special effects. However it was popular at the box office. He said:

That film, because of its good fast action, succeeded both here and overseas because the British market was wide open for good second features. They like to make their own first features, naturally, but they were after good second features like these we provided. When it was good action or good comedy you had no trouble selling them at all. We sold all our pictures in England, right from the first one on.

=== Critical ===
Filmink wrote "It’s a very solid story – plenty of conflict, romance, comedy, twists and turns" with "some first-rate characterisations" that is "very adult about sex (far more so than Hollywood films of this era), without being judge-y – Claire is pregnant to Blake, Joan clearly has sexual desires for Jim... if we’re not mistaken, the film implies that Joan and Jim sleep together."
