= Lovers and Luggers =

- Flyer for theatrical release
- Directed by: Ken G. Hall
- Written by: Frank Harvey; Edmund Barclay
- Based on: novel by Gurney Slade
- Produced by: Ken G. Hall
- Starring: Lloyd Hughes; Shirley Ann Richards
- Cinematography: Frank Hurley; George Heath
- Edited by: William Shepherd
- Music by: Hamilton Webber
- Production company: Cinesound Productions
- Distributed by: British Empire Films (Aust); Paramount Pictures (UK)Astor Pictures (USA)
- Release dates: 31 December 1937 (Australia); 1940 (USA)
- Running time: 99 mins (Australia); 96 mins (Uk); 65 mins (USA)
- Country: Australia
- Language: English
- Budget: £24,000

Lovers and Luggers is a 1937 Australian film directed by Ken G. Hall. It is an adventure melodrama about a pianist (Lloyd Hughes) who goes to Thursday Island to retrieve a valuable pearl. It has been called one of Hall's best films.

It was retitled Vengeance of the Deep in the US and United Kingdom.

== Synopsis ==
In London, concert pianist Daubenny Carshott is feeling dissatisfied with his life and wanting a masculine adventure; he also desires the beautiful Stella Raff. Stella agrees to marry him if he brings back a large pearl with his own hands from Thursday Island. Daubenny notes a painting in Stella's apartment from "Craig Henderson" but when asked Stella is evasive about the artist.

Daubenny travels to Thursday Island where he buys a lugger and a house from the villainous Mendoza. He makes friends on the island, including another diver, Bill Craig, the drunken duo of McTavish and Dorner, and the boisterous Captain Quidley. He also meets Quidley's daughter, the beautiful Lorna, who likes to dress in men's clothing so she can walk around on her own at night. Lorna and Daubenny become friends and she secretly falls in love with him but Daubenny assumes she is in love with Craig.

Captain Quidley teaches Daubenny to dive. Quidley, Lorna, Daubenny and Mendoza all go out diving for pearls. Daubenny finds a pearl, to the fury of Mendoza, who believes since Daubenny used his lugger that Mendoza should have a share. Daubenny disagrees and the two men fight on board the lugger, causing the pearl to drop over the side.

Both men get in their diving suits and go down to retrieve the pearl. Mendoza dies and Daubenny is trapped. Bill Craig risks his life to rescue Daubenny.

Back on Thursday Island, Stella has arrived, accompanied by an aristocratic friend, Archie. Daubenny discovers that Bill Craig is Craig Henderson, and was also in love with Stella, and sent on a similar mission to find a pearl. Daubenny and Craig both reject Stella.

Daubenny decides to leave Thursday Island on his boat. Lorna reveals she is in love with him, not Craig, and the two kiss and decide to get married. They sail off into the sunset with Captain Quidley.

== Cast ==
- Lloyd Hughes as Daubenny Carshott
- Shirley Ann Richards as Lorna Quidley
- Sidney Wheeler as Captain Quidley
- James Raglan as Bill Craig/Craig Henderson
- Elaine Hamill as Stella Raff
- Frank Harvey as Carshott's manager
- Ronald Whelan as Mendoza
- Alec Kellaway as McTavish
- Leslie Victor as Dormer
- Campbell Copelin as Archie
- Charlie Chan as Kishimuni
- Marcelle Marnay as Lotus
- Horace Cleary as China Tom
- Claude Turton as Charlie Quong
- Bobbie Hunt as Lady Winter
- Paul Furness as Professor of psychology
- Charles Zoli as Carshott's valet
- Bill Onus as an Aboriginal man

== Original novel ==
Lovers and Luggers
- Author: Gurney Slade,
- Language: English
- Genre: adventure
- Publication date: 1928
- Publication place: United Kingdom

The script was based on a 1928 novel by Gurney Slade, from whom Cinesound obtained the film rights in late 1936. In the novel, Daubenny travels to "Lorne" (Broome, thinly-disguised) rather than Thursday Island. Lorna is not related to Captain Quid, but actually is Stella's half-sister. There are two other British expatriates diving for pearls in addition to Craig, Chillon and Major Rawlings. Daubney does not romance Lorna and is reunited with a reformed Stella at the end. Lorna winds up with Craig.

The Australian Woman's Mirror wrote "Though Mr. Slade manages to make an interesting, lighthearted romance, he asks his readers to swallow much more than the average author dares." However the reviewer felt although the set up was "wildly improbable, but the reader is compensated for being patient over it by a rather neat surprise and the satisfaction of seeing the violinist and the lady meeting again on the best of terms. The style is very flippant, but it agrees well enough with the breezy love-story."

In December 1936 Stuart Doyle of Cinesound announced he had bought the film rights. It was supposedly the first time the movie rights to a foreign novel had been bought by an Australian company. According to Filminkit "wasn’t a particularly well-known novel and was based around a silly idea (man chases pearl to impress woman) but one can see its attraction for Cinesound –it offered a heroic lead role, the opportunity for romance, music and action, a colourful setting and support cast, it was Australian but was action-adventure and thus might travel overseas, and gave an opportunity to use the studio’s top-notch art department and fancy new back projection equipment."

Although the novel was set in Broome Ken G. Hall had Cinesound screenwriter Frank Harvey relocate the story to Thursday Island because it was easier to access.

== Production ==
It was one of a number of Australian films around the pearling industry, other ones including Typhoon Treasure. Cinesound had just made another adventure melodrama Tall Timbers.

=== Casting ===
Hall gave the lead role to American actor Lloyd Hughes, who had been a star in the silent era and since then mostly worked on stage. Hall had met Hughes when the director visited Hollywood in 1935. The actor went on to make The Broken Melody for Hall.

This was the first of what would be several character roles Alec Kellaway played for Ken G. Hall. The cast included a Hong Kong actor called Charlie Chan.

James Raglan was signed on a seven-week contract. Filmink argued "Hughes isn’t great, but the key players around him are very good."

=== Shooting ===
Hall was enthusiastic about the project because of his love for the tropics, although budget considerations meant most of the film had to be shot in the studio, with only the second unit going to Thursday Island under Frank Hurley. Hurley also shot some footage at Port Stephens and Broken Bay. Cinesound built one of its largest ever sets to recreate Thursday Island. It has been called "one of the best-looking Australian movies of its era."

Filming of the main unit began 7 June 1936. Second unit filming took place in April.

A tank was built to shoot the underwater scenes. However the water was not clear, so the scenes were shot at North Sydney Olympic Pool. Hall would direct scenes on boats by radio.

In June, Hall paid tribute to art director Eric Thompson saying, "we have had almost incessant rain since we began production some five weeks ago with the result that we have been compelled to keep on working 'exteriors,' and immediately we finish one set Eric's boys have to start demolishing and assembling a new set for the next take". Stuart F. Doyle resigned from Cinesound during production but was kept on to supervise the finishing of the movie.

Reports of the budget ranged from £18,000 to £24,000.

== Reception ==
A charity ball was held to promote the release of the film. The film was released in both the US and England. It was the last Australian film sold to Britain as a British quota picture before the British quota laws were amended.

=== Critical ===
Reviews were positive, the critic from The Sydney Morning Herald calling it "Australia's finest picture to date."

The Bulletin called it "a jolly good entertainer...a great advance even on Tall Timbers. It hasn't spectacle as unique as the timber drive in that film, but it has an altogether better story, more interesting scenes, more action, more varied characters, and it deals with a more colorful cross-section of life...It is almost incredibly better film than the narrative outline might seem to permit."

Variety felt "Lloyd Hughes’ name isn’t likely to sell the production to Americans" but thought "Pic has class, plus expert direction and contains some of the finest under-water sequences ever witnessed upon the screen... From a slow beginning, the pic moves swiftly along under Hall's direction to a smash climax. Atmospheric shots are pips and put the film into the top class."

Filmink, while knowledging the movie "has the racial sensitivities of the time" called it one of Hall's "best films, full of life, good nature, and positivity. You can feel the director working at the top of his game, with an excellent cast and crew on a life-affirming story."

=== Box office ===
The movie was profitable but was a slight disappointment at the box office, and Ken G. Hall thought this helped make Greater Union's then-managing director Norman Rydge disillusioned with feature production.

Variety said it and Broken Melody performed better in the "nabes and stix" but were not as successful as Gone to the Dogs and Dad and Dave Come to Town which "smashed records everywhere". Filmink speculated the film possibly "would have been a bigger hit with a more virile star, or a more serious story – the stakes of this are very light and a murder could have cranked things up."

However Hall said in 1972 that "I think I like it best of all the pictures that I've made. Because of the backgrounds. I'd go tomorrow to make a film about the Tropics."
