= Ronald Whelan (actor) =

Australian actor

Ronald Albert Whelan (2 November 1905–1965) (real name Ronald Waxman) was an Australian actor, assistant director and unit manager. He was the son of actor Albert Whelan.

Whelan alternated between England and Australia. He established himself Britain as an actor and dancer in revues and musical comedies. He also appeared in revues in Australia such as Snap (1924).

A 1937 article claimed Whelan "has appeared in about 100 British films, yet he has not had a part in which he could use natural manner. He has played Jewish, Scottish, Irish, Spanish, Italian, German, and gangster (American) parts, and has always spoken broken English or dialect."

Whelan returned to Australia in 1933. In the 1930s Whelan regularly worked for Cinesound Productions as an actor (usually in villainous roles) and assistant director. In December 1935 he was involved in a car accident.

He moved to the US and worked steadily as a character actor. He died in Los Angeles in 1965.

== Credits ==
- Snap (1925) - stage revue - actor
- Her Past (1934) - stage play - actor
- Mother of Pear (1934) - stage play, actor
- Thoroughbred (1936) - film - actor, assistant director
- Tall Timbers (1936) - film - assistant director, actor
- Orphan of the Wilderness (1936) - film - assistant director, actor
- It Isn't Done (1937) - film - actor
- Lovers and Luggers (1937) - film - assistant director, actor
- The Broken Melody - film - actor, assistant director
- Mr Chedworth Steps Out (1938) - film - assistant director
- Dad and Dave Come to Town (1938) - film - assistant director
- Gone to the Dogs (1939) - film - actor, assistant director
- Ants in His Pants (1939) - film - assistant director, actor
- Dad Rudd, M.P. (1940) - film - assistant director, actor
- Forty Thousand Horsemen (1940) - film - assistant director
- Sporting Blood (1945) - radio serial - actor
- Eureka Stockade (1949) - film - production manager, actor
- Chips (1951) - radio serial - actor
- Kangaroo (1952) - film - actor
- I Found Joe Barton (1953) - TV pilot - actor
- Return to Paradise (1953) - film - assistant director
- Captain Thunderbolt (1953) - film - actor
- With Cain Go Wander (1953) - radio play - actor
- Eternal Night (1954) - stage play - actor
- The Strong Are Lonely (1956) - radio play - actor
- The Shiralee (1957) - film - actor
- Fountains Beyond (1957) - radio play - actor
- Summer of the Seventeenth Doll (1959) - film - production manager
- Whiplash (1960) - TV series - unit manager
- No Man is an Island (1962) - film - unit manager
- Drums of Africa (1963) - film - actor
- I Spy (1965) - TV series - actor
- Burke's Law (1965) - TV series - actor
