= Orphan of the Wilderness =

- Directed by: Ken G. Hall
- Written by: Edmond Seward
- Based on: novel Wilderness Orphan by Dorothy Cottrell
- Produced by: Ken G. Hall
- Starring: Brian Abbot; Gwen Munro
- Cinematography: George Heath
- Edited by: William Shepherd
- Music by: Hamilton Webber
- Production company: Cinesound Productions
- Distributed by: British Empire Films (Australia); Pathe (UK)
- Release dates: December 1936 (Australia); 10 November 1938 (USA); 1938 (UK)
- Running time: 85 minutes (Australia); 69 minutes (UK)
- Country: Australia
- Language: English
- Budget: £12,000 or £15,000

Orphan of the Wilderness is a 1936 Australian feature film from director Ken G. Hall about the adventures of a boxing kangaroo. It starred Brian Abbot who disappeared at sea not long after filming completed.

Ken Hall later said "the fauna sequences...were really artistic. That film developed so that you had the deepest possible sympathy for those animals and there was nothing phony or faked about it. It was quite beautiful and quite artistic and I’m still very proud of it and the magnificent photographic work of George Heath... that film was very successful commercially both here and overseas. True the human actors weren’t nearly as good as the kangaroos. They lacked the artistry of the uninhibited fauna."

== Synopsis ==
Chut is a kangaroo whose mother is killed by hunters. He wanders through the bush and eventually arrives at a homestead, where he is befriended by a farmer, Tom Henton. Years later, Tom puts Chut in a travelling circus run by Shorty McGee. Tom's girlfriend Margot performs in the circus and says she'll look after Chut.

McGee trains Chut as a boxing kangaroo and becomes famous around Australia. Neither Margot or Tom are aware that Shorty whips the kangaroo prior to bouts. One day Chut fights back against McGree and takes off into the bush, pursued by men with rifles and dogs. Tom and his station hands eventually ride to the rescue and Tom beats up McGee.

Chut settles down on Tom's property.

== Cast ==
- Brian Abbot as Tom Henton
- Gwen Munro as Margot
- Ethel Saker as Mrs Henton
- Harry Abdy as Shorty McGee
- Ronald Whelan as Mel
- Joe Valli as Andrew McMeeker
- Sylvia Kellaway as Jill
- June Munro as June
- Edna Montgomery as Nell
- Claude Turton as Dan
- Arthur Connell as circus watchman
- Leo Cracknell as Otto Ambergres
- Sid Knowles as Beller
- Jack Souter as grocer
- Victor Fitzherbert
- Jack Solomon
- Captain A.C. Stevens as Burke
- George Scott as the strong man
- Dick Ryan as the kid

== Production ==
When Ken Hall returned from Hollywood in 1935, he announced that his first three films would be Thoroughbred, Big Timber and Robbery Under Arms. Stuart F. Doyle wanted Hall to make a 50-minute short to support Thoroughbred similar to the way Cinesound Varieties was used to support The Silence of Dean Maitland (1934). Hall says Edmond Seward discovered the story in Cosmopolitan magazine and was attracted to its originality and setting. It has been suggested the recent success of Call of the Wild (1935) may also have been an influence.

Eventually as scripting progressed, Hall decided to expand the story to feature length and add a romantic subplot.

Harry Abdy owned the kangaroo who played Chut in the movie. He had travelled in Australia and the US as a boxing kangaroo.

Hall cast two newcomers in the leads, Brian Abbot and Gwen Munro.

Shooting took place in May and June 1936, on location at Burragorang Valley and Camden, and at Cinesound's studios in Bondi. J Alan Kenyon created a large bushland set inside the studio, 140 feet by 70 feet.

Production was difficult due to the problems of dealing with animals, who were unused to studio lights and following direction, especially kangaroos. Shooting held up for several days due to an illness of Gwen Munro. Harry Abdy was injured sparring with a kangaroo. Some cast and crew were injured in a car accident on the way back from location. Hall says he also had trouble with his actors:

When you're asked for a low-cost second or B feature, your inclination can be to approach it as a quickie. Mine was, initially, and that was a bad mistake. On this one we used too many raw people in the cast as a sort of break-in for them. This not only slowed us down in trying to get performances from inexperienced people, but that inexperience showed up in some of them in the finished picture. But not fatally. And certainly not in Gwen Munro...or Harry Abdy.

Worried about accusations of cruelty to animals on Hollywood movies, Hall arranged for representatives from the RSPCA to supervise filming. He offered free admission to people to attend the circus sequences so he did not have to pay extras.

== Release ==
After seeing the film, Doyle decided not to release it as a second feature but instead issue on its own at Christmas time. Reviews were generally positive.

=== Box office ===
The film was not a massive success at the local box office, due in part to the fact many of the tickets were bought by children at concession prices. But it was popular and sold well overseas.

=== British release ===
It was the first Australian movie to be sold to England before it had even been completed The film was released in the US as Wild Innocence and screened widely in Europe. It was banned in England for a time because it depicted cruelty to animals and did not achieve release until 1938 after several cuts had been made.

In 1936 it was voted the film of the year by the newly formed Film Critics of Australia Guild.

At one stage Cinesound had plans to make another animal movie from a script by Frank Hurley and Kenneth Wilkinson, but these were abandoned prior to Orphan of the Wilderness being shot.

Filmink called it one of Ken G Hall's best films, noting "the movie looks absolutely gorgeous and has a touch of magic about it" although it "isn’t an easy watch. The kangaroo boxing scenes are quite harrowing, especially as it’s clear that’s a real kangaroo on screen, thumping away."

== Notes ==
- Hall, Ken G., Directed by Ken G. Hall, Lansdowne Press, 1977
