= Jean Hatton =

Australian actress and singer (born 1922)

Jean Hatton (born 1922) was an Australian singer and actor who was under contract to Cinesound Productions in the 1930s. She was discovered in a Deanna Durbin talent quest and cast as Cecil Kellaway's daughter in Mr. Chedworth Steps Out (1939), singing several songs. Filmink called her performance "very sweet and engaging".

She was subsequently cast in Come Up Smiling (1939). During filming she fell down two flights of stairs and was injured, causing filming to be delayed, but she recovered. She later performed in concerts and radio and was generally advertised as "Australia's Deanna Durbin".

She appeared in the 1940 radio serial Sweetheart of the Regiment.

Hatton later married Keith White, and resided in Turramurra, New South Wales. Together they had two sons. In April 1971, it was reported that Hatton was retired from show business and "a happy middle-aged woman".

In May 1987, Hatton was interviewed and spoke of her distaste in being dubbed "Australia's Deanna Durbin", stating "It upset me greatly: it always has done and it always will".

== Filmography ==
- Mr. Chedworth Steps Out (1939)
- Come Up Smiling (1939)
