= The Broken Melody (1938 film) =

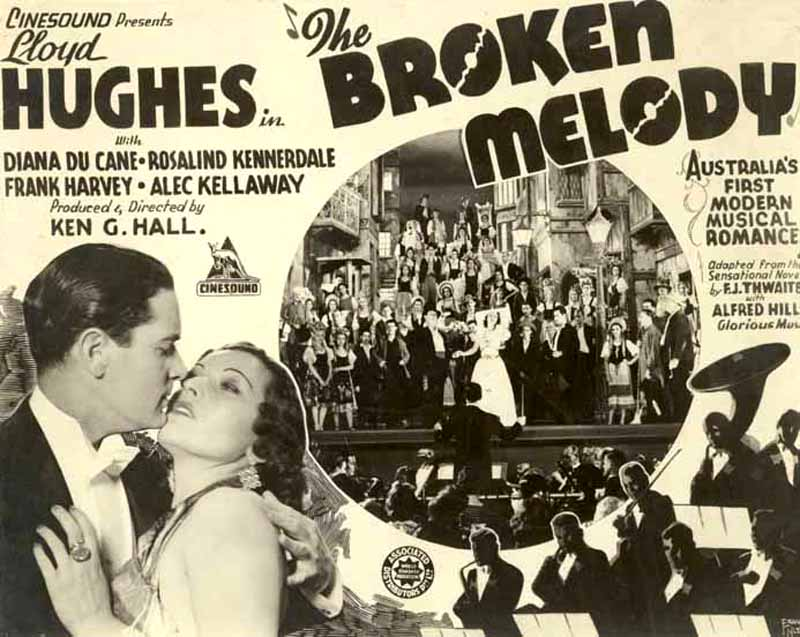
- The Broken Melody poster
- Directed by: Ken G. Hall
- Written by: Frank Harvey
- Based on: novel by F. J. Thwaites
- Produced by: Ken G. Hall
- Starring: Lloyd Hughes
- Cinematography: George Heath
- Edited by: William Shepherd
- Music by: Horace Keats; Hamilton Webber; Alfred Hill (special theme)
- Production company: Cinesound Productions
- Distributed by: British Empire Films (Aust); RKO (UK)
- Release date: 17 June 1938 (Australia)
- Running time: 89 mins
- Country: Australia
- Language: English
- Budget: £20,000 (est.)

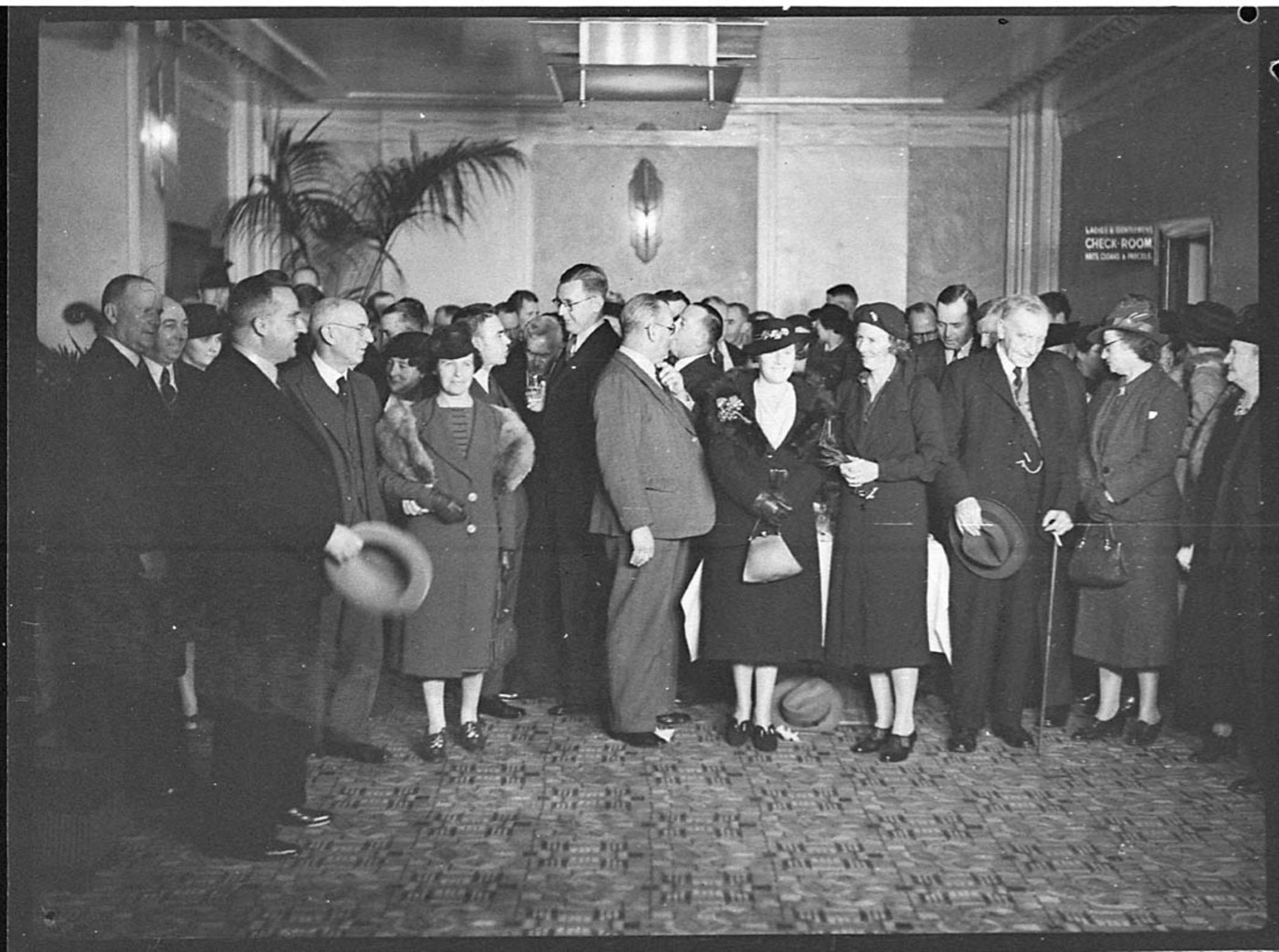
Premiere of The Broken Melody

The Broken Melody is a 1938 Australian drama film directed by Ken G. Hall and starring Lloyd Hughes, based on a best-selling novel by F. J. Thwaites.

Hall later said in 1974 that "This was a film that I’m particularly keen about still."

== Synopsis ==
John Ainsworth helps win a rowing race for Sydney University against Melbourne University. While celebrating at a nightclub, he demonstrates his skill with the violin with one of his original compositions. He also flirts with a young woman, Ann Brady, to the displeasure of a crook, Webster. A brawl results and John is expelled from university. John's sheep farmer father – who is disdainful of culture and wants John to marry a rich girl – is furious and disowns his son.

The Depression is in full flight and John has difficulty obtaining work. He befriends a pickpocket, Joe, who invites John to live with him in the Sydney Domain. One night he comes across Ann trying to commit suicide under the Sydney Harbour Bridge. He stops her and she goes to live with John and Joe.

John gets hold of his old violin and starts playing for his fellow homeless vagrants in the Domain. He is overheard one night by a rich couple travelling through the area and soon becomes a well known violinist under the name "John Hilton", working with manager. He goes to London, taking Joe with him as his valet but leaving Ann behind. He meets a famous singer, Madame Le Lange, and rises to fame as a leading conductor and composer.

John returns to Australia intending to conduct his new opera in triumph. His father, whose property is greatly in debt, suffers a heart attack. Madame Le Lange throws a tantrum and refuses to appear. Anne steps in, John's father recovers and the opera is a big success.

== Cast ==
- Lloyd Hughes as John Ainsworth
- Diana Du Cane as Ann Brady
- Rosalind Kennerdale as Madame de Lange
- Frank Harvey as Jules de Latanac
- Alec Kellaway as Joe Larkin
- Harry Abdy as Sam Harris
- Rita Pauncefort as Bella
- Harold Meade as Michael Ainsworth
- June Munro as Nibs Ainsworth
- Ronald Whelan as Bullman
- Lionello Cecil as the tenor
- Letty Craydon as the maid
- Marshall Crosby as rowing trainer
- Gough Whitlam as man in nightclub
- Betty Bryant

== Original novel ==
See The Broken Melody (novel)

F.W. Thwaites' original novel was a best seller on its publication. In January 1937 Cinesound bought the screenrights. Hall later said, "as a piece of literature it was not good. But it had a tremendous sale and that persuaded me to buy the book and we found we had a great deal of re-writing to do. And I wanted to get music in. We learned how while I was in Hollywood. "

== Production ==
The movie was part of a policy from Cinesound Productions to make top line movies, which also included Tall Timbers and Lovers and Luggers. According to Everyones, The Broken Melody "represents perhaps the biggest and most ambitious idea of them all. It is a musical, but a musical with a difference—one that would be fit for any topline story... there is music planned on a grand scale never before attempted in Australian production."

Filmink argued Hall might have been attracted to the project for "the story, some juicy acting roles, the fact that it was pre-existing IP, the opportunity for the Cinesound team to create memorable sets (a homeless camp on the Sydney foreshore, concert halls, night clubs) and most of all, a big massive musical finale, where he got Alfred Hill to write a whole opera."

The movie was to be the first of five movies made by Cinesound Productions for a total cost of £100,000, others including Gone to the Dogs and Robbery Under Arms (the latter was never made).

=== Casting ===
American star Lloyd Hughes, who previously appeared in Lovers and Luggers for Cinesound, returned to Australia to play the male lead. (Filmink argued he was "absurdly miscast.")

Regular female Cinesound star Ann Richards was not cast the film as she was exhausted after making three films back to back.

Diana du Cane was an English actress who had toured Australia with JC Williamson Ltd and appeared in a number of radio plays in Australia. Rosalind Kennerdale was another radio actor.

Hall said "we had to find people who could sing it because the girls we had couldn’t sing a note. Rosalind Kennerdale was a fine actress but she was no singer, and I had to find a woman to sing for her. And the leading woman [du Cane]... got very upset because I wouldn’t let her sing opera — after all she sang musical comedy! Alfreda Hill sang it, but she was never seen."

=== Filming ===
Filming started in September 1937, with the elaborate cabaret scene shot first. Future Australian Prime Minister Gough Whitlam was a law student at the time and appeared as an extra in this scene. Shooting wound up in November.

=== Music ===
Noted Australian composer Alfred Hill was especially commissioned to write an operetta for the movie. Hamilton Webber, conductor of the State Theatre Orchestra, rehearsed and conducted the A.B.C. Symphony Orchestra conducted by Lionel Lawson. There was the choir of 40 voices conducted by R. McLelland and Lionello Cecil, Australian tenor, appeared in the film.

The opera scenes were shot using the "play back" method. According to Hall, "Clyde Cross had learned the technique of how to break up a sound track and mark it for playback. You see you were working off positive tracks then, you couldn’t play it back off a tape, there was no such thing. We knew that technique and we took on this operetta."

== Release ==
Reviews praised the movie but criticised the melodramatic plot. Hall gave the movie a sneak preview in the style of Hollywood studios which produced a strong response and box office performance was solid.

=== Critical ===
Variety said the film performed better in the "nabes and stix although" it was "a class production".

Smith's Weekly said the film was "surprisingly successful, in spite of poor story; music good, general craftsmanship excellent."

The Bulletin "Cinesound’s latest is a pleasant and capable blending of heart-interest, comedy and tunefulness, and those three ingredients being successfully mixed in the one film marks another step forward for Australian productions."

Filmink felt "the first half is strong, with John and Ann falling in love in poverty, but things become less sure after he is “discovered”. The estrangement between John and his father is dealt with far too simply, and the climax seems contrived, with Ann having an unconvincing change of heart" and "no real stakes for the final concert." However "there are terrific things in it and it is very entertaining."

In Britain the movie was released under the title The Vagabond Violinist to avoid confusion with the British film, The Broken Melody (1934).

Despite the film's success, this was Hall's last drama for Cinesound. In 1938 the British government ruled that Australian films no longer counted as British for purposes of the local quota, and therefore could not be guaranteed release over there. Accordingly, Cinesound's next six movies were all comedies even though Hall preferred drama.

"It is so much cleaner", he said at the time. "There is no mess of pies and so forth to be swept from the studio, as there is after slapstick."

F. J. Thwaites expressed pleasure with the film.

== Radio adaptation ==
The novel was adapted for radio in 1961.
