= Mr. Chedworth Steps Out =

- Theatrical release poster
- Directed by: Ken G. Hall
- Written by: Frank Harvey
- Based on: novel Mr Chedworth Hits Out by Francis Morton Howard
- Produced by: Ken G. Hall
- Starring: Cecil Kellaway; Rita Pauncefort; Peter Finch
- Cinematography: George Heath
- Edited by: William Shepherd
- Music by: Hamilton Webber
- Production company: Cinesound Productions
- Distributed by: British Empire Films
- Release dates: April 1939 (Australia); 1939 (UK)
- Running time: 92 minutes
- Country: Australia
- Language: English
- Budget: £21,000

Mr. Chedworth Steps Out is a 1939 Australian comedy film directed by Ken G. Hall starring Cecil Kellaway. Kellaway returned to Australia from Hollywood to make the film, which features an early screen appearance by Peter Finch.

It was the fifteenth feature film from Hall and Cinesound Productions. Hall later said "I think that we made a pretty good picture."

The film was released in the United States by Astor Pictures Corp. in 1943, retitled as Forged Money.

== Plot summary ==
A mild-mannered clerk, George Chedworth, is married to the snobbish, nagging Julie, and has four children: gambling addict Arthur, beautiful Gwen, teenage singer Susie and young Fred. Chedworth lends money to Arthur to cover his gambling debts to a bookmaker, and is persuaded by the bookmaker on a long-shot wager. Chedworth is then fired from his job after 24 years of service. He is given a compensatory employment as a night watchman, and stumbles upon some money hidden by gangsters and an old printing press.

Chedworth uses the money to improve his situation. He wins a fortune from an accidental racing bet and from some apparently worthless gold mining shares sold to him by some crooks, including Arthur's boss Leon Fencott. Chedworth moves into a large house, unaware the money he discovered was counterfeit. Fencott is the head of the forgers.

When Arthur tries to pass off one of his forged bank notes to Fencott, the gangsters come after the money and kidnap Chedworth. They are arrested by Brian Carford, a federal agent who has been romancing Gwen and watching Chedworth to see if he is a forger. Chedworth gets to keep his legitimate fortune and Susie wins a singing competition.

== Cast ==
- Cecil Kellaway as George Chedworth
- James Raglan as Brian Carford
- Joan Deering as Gwen Chedworth
- Rita Pauncefort as Julia Chedworth
- Jean Hatton as Susie Chedworth
- Peter Finch as Arthur Chedworth
- Rodney Jacobs as Fred Chedworth
- Sidney Wheeler as Leon Fencoff
- Ronald Whelan as Benny
- Leslie Victor as Leslie
- Cecil Perry as Maguire
- Charmaine Ross as Ada Fencott
- Harvey Adams as Mason
- Ben Lewin as Welch
- Barrett Lennard as Perse Faulkner
- Field Fisher as bailiff
- Letty Craydon as Mrs Blundell
- Les Warton as Sole Barnes
- Phil Smith as estate agent

== Production ==
=== Development ===
The script was based on the English novel, Mr Chedworth Hits Out (1936) by F Morton Howard. Filmink noted "It wasn’t a well-known book, and Howard wasn’t that famous an author, and thus the title had little pre-sold-IP factor. However, the novel did offer a splendid role for Kellaway." The script was adapted by Cinesound's regular writer Frank Harvey; it has been called "a patchwork quilt... full of contrivances and repetition."

The movie was intended as the first of a projected £200,000 five-film program by Cinesound Productions, the others being Gone to the Dogs (1939), Robbery Under Arms, The Further Adventures of Dad and Dave (which became Dad Rudd, MP 1940), and The Haunted House. Robbery Under Arms and The Haunted House were never made.

The film was specifically designed as a vehicle for Cecil Kellaway. He had been working in Hollywood following the success of It Isn't Done (1937) but agreed to come back to Australia especially to make the film at the request of Ken G. Hall. "He was getting much more money than we had offered him but he felt that he owed us something", said Hall.

Kellaway was under contract to RKO so Cinesound had to get their permission to borrow him for the film. It was thought this was the first time the Hollywood studios had done that for one of their actors to appear in an Australian film. He was borrowed for four months.

Kellaway later said he was attracted to the lead role:

It is the part of a human being, not a screen stereotype, for 'Mr. Chedworth' is fighting a battle of circumstances. A lonely, down-trodden little man, he is fighting to uphold his inner better self. It will carry a message to every home, because it depicts the strange fact that it is in our homes we find our harshest critics. There is drama and comedy delightfully combined, when George Chedworth, reclaiming himself as a man, becomes at last the head of his house, and . . . steps out!

=== Support roles ===
The part of Cecil Kellaway's youngest daughter was played by Jean Hatton, a young singer who was brought to the attention of Ken G. Hall after she won a Deanna Durbin talent quest. She was signed by Cinesound to a long-term contract, later appearing in Come Up Smiling. Her part in the film was written especially for her. She sings two songs during the film's climax, "If It Rains, Who Cares" and "Lo, Hear the Gentle Lark", which was staged in a massive 40-foot set build for the film replicating a radio station.

Rita Pauncefort, who plays Kellaway's nagging wife, was a highly experienced actor of stage and film. She had first acted opposite Cecil Kellaway in South Africa in 1914.

Joan Deering, who plays the ingenue, had never acted on screen before but had a strong theatrical background, having toured with revue companies in England and South Africa. She was English and moved to Australia in 1935 after touring with Frank Neil's pantomime company. Ken G. Hall had met her socially and suggested she screen test. Peter Finch was cast after the impression he made in Dad and Dave Come to Town (1938).

=== Shooting ===
Kellaway arrived back in Australia in early October 1938 and shooting took place through that month to November.

Most of the film was shot in Cinesound's studios at Bondi with some location work at Lapstone Hill and Sydney Girls High School. A farewell ball to celebrate the end of shooting was held in December.

There is a line in the film where Cecil Kellaway scolds his son (Peter Finch) for betting on horses. During filming this caused the crew to burst out laughing because Kellaway was known as a keen gambler. "He had his mind on the racetrack all the time", said Hall. "As soon as I'd say 'Cut!' he'd be off like a rabbit up a bank and out the back to the radio to hear what had won the last. He was a mad punter."

Costumes were designed by Thelma Afford, wife of top Australian writer Max Afford.

Hall was paid £30 a week to direct while Frank Harvey was paid £20 a week over four weeks to write it. Kellaway's fee was £500, covering eight weeks.

== Release ==
=== Box office ===
The film was not one of Cinesound's biggest successes but reportedly made "a comfortable profit".

=== Critical ===
Reviews were positive.

Variety said:

Ken G. Hall's latest should find high trade in the home field, with the possibility of a British break as well... However, there's little market seen for the U. S. Cecil Kellaway, the marquee lure, turns in a corking performance, while Hall has given class direction to the production. Jean Hatton, winner of a Deanna Durbin contest, has vast possibilities; she knows how to act and has an excellent singing voice. The rest of the cast, with the exception of Rita Patmcefort, who overplays, turns In good performances. Dialog is crisp; story, however, is weak and brings in everything, including gangsters. Yet Hall has managed to pace the picture briskly throughout... Camera is first class; sets are splendid and the whole production generally carries a high production standard.

The Age called it a "lively, well made picture".

In later years the film has come to be regarded as one of Ken G Hall's best. Paul Byrnes later wrote for Australian Screen Online that:

Mr Chedworth Steps Out has all the usual elements of a Cinesound entertainment – four or five plotlines, a master villain, even a couple of songs... but it has one element that lifts it above the pack – Cecil Kellaway... His performance as the little man who learns to assert himself is one of the best in all the Cinesound films, and Ken Hall's direction is a large part of that success. The film is put together with great care and confidence, rather than the haste that mars some of Hall's work. Kellaway was playing Hall's favourite type of hero, a nobody who becomes a somebody. He was similar to the man he plays in It Isn’t Done (1937) but more downtrodden, and thus capable of more anger and passion. Once again, the film has the feel of a Frank Capra film, but this time, Kellaway is able to give us a much more shaded performance, tinged with bitterness and a hint of bile. Whether the film remains a comedy is debatable. Rita Pauncefort's portrayal of Mrs Chedworth as a nagging social climber and spendthrift is beyond satire, heading for something more caustic. The undeclared class warfare in a lot of Ken Hall's films becomes full-scale attack in this film – Mrs Chedworth is a nouveau riche shrew, the object of a special scorn that's not so much humorous as contemptuous... the depiction of Mrs Chedworth feels like the settling of some deep personal score [by Hall].

Filmink argued the movie is "not a cohesive a film in the way, say, It Isn’t Done was, or his George Wallace/Dad and Dave movies were. Instead, it’s one part well-observed comedy drama... one part Deanna Durbin film... and one part broad comedy... a movie with great stuff in it that feels as though it was rushed into production because that’s when everyone was available and the script probably needed a bit more work. Still, it’s absolutely worth watching."

=== Proposed remake ===
The US rights were purchased by Casino Films in New York who at one stage announced they were considering possibly filming a remake. However this never happened.

== Notes ==
- Murray, Scott, ed. (1994). Australian Cinema. St. Leonards, NSW.: Allen & Unwin/AFC. p. 273. ISBN 1-86373-311-6.
