= It Isn't Done =

Australian comedy film about a grazier's inheritance

- Directed by: Ken G. Hall
- Written by: Frank Harvey; Carl Dudley
- Based on: original story by Cecil Kellaway
- Produced by: Ken G. Hall
- Starring: Cecil Kellaway; Shirley Ann Richards
- Cinematography: George Heath
- Edited by: William Shepherd
- Music by: Hamilton Webber
- Production company: Cinesound Productions
- Distributed by: British Empire Films (Aust); MGM (UK)
- Release dates: February 1937 (Australia); 1938 (UK)
- Running time: 90 minutes (Australia); 77 mins (UK)
- Country: Australia
- Language: English
- Budget: £15,000 or £21,000

It Isn't Done is a 1937 Australian comedy film about a grazier (Cecil Kellaway) who inherits a barony in England.

== Synopsis ==
Hubert Blaydon, an Australian farmer, inherits a baronial estate and moves to England with his wife and daughter Patricia, a university student, to collect it. He finds it difficult to adapt to upper class customs and faces snobbishness from Lord Denvee and difficulties with his butler Jarms. Patricia falls for a writer, Peter Ashton, who is next in line for the title and the estate.

Hubert misses Australia. He eventually contrives evidence that Peter is the legal heir and bonds with Lord Denvee over the fact that both their sons died on the same day in World War I. Hubert and his wife return to Australia with Jarms while Patricia and Peter are married.

== Cast ==
- Cecil Kellaway as Hubert Blaydon
- Shirley Ann Richards as Patricia Blaydon
- John Longden as Peter Ashton
- Frank Harvey as Lord Denvee
- Harvey Adams as Jarms
- Nellie Ferguson as Mrs Blaydon
- Campbell Copelin as Ronald Dudley
- Bobby Hunt as Lady Denvee
- Leslie Victor as Potter
- Harold Meade as Lady Addersley
- Rita Paucefort as Mrs Dudley
- Douglas Channell as Harry Blaydon
- Sylvia Kellaway as Elsie Blaydon
- Hilda Dorrington as Mrs Ashton
- Ronald Whelan as Perroni

== Production ==
=== Development ===
The film was based on an original story by Cecil Kellaway which he had written in between acts while performing in White Horse Inn on stage. Hall liked the basic idea but said Kellaway was unable to put it down to paper.

Hall originally imported American writer Carl Dudley from Los Angeles to adapt it into a feature film script. Dudley intended to stay in Australia for 12 months.

Hall had the script worked on by playwright and actor Frank Harvey, who had recently joined Cinesound as a dialogue director. Hall later said "Harvey and I got together and worked it [Kellaway's idea] into a script, retaining all his basic ideas, and the basic theme, because the original idea appealed to both of us. Harvey was very English, educated at Winchester where ‘Manners maketh the man’ was the motto, you know. Very English." Harvey went on to write all of Ken G. Hall's films for Cinesound. Hall says he had considerable input to the film as well. It has been argued the script may have been influenced by Clara Gibbings (1934) a film made by Harvey.

"If anything, the English will get more knocks than the Australians", said Hall at the time. "But there will be hits at both sides-nothing malicious; just a good-humoured conflict of ideas." He later elaborated, "Gently rubbishing the British. Gently rubbishing Australians too. That’s why the film succeeded in both England and Australia. There was no dirt thrown at any time. It was a ‘sling off‘, as we say in the vernacular, but it was still pro-British in sentiment. Don’t forget that the Australian people were tremendously British-oriented round that time."

Cecil Kellaway later claimed the lead character was based on a real grazier from New South Wales:

I've enjoyed portraying this role, because I know him so thoroughly. I've stayed on his property, I've studied his mannerisms. He is the jovial, lovable person who is symbolic of the democratic carefree spirit of a sunny land.... To me, he is typical of so many of our countrymen. In many of his scenes I have endeavoured to give something that hopes for a laugh and faintly suggests a tear. I sincerely hope I have succeeded.

At one stage the film was called Something in Common. The title was changed to It Isn't Done just before filming.

=== Casting ===
The film marked the feature debut of Shirley Ann Richards who was a graduate of Cinesound's Talent School, run by Harvey and George Parker. Although she was not very experienced, she proved a natural and was enormously popular. She was signed to a long-term contract with Cinesound and went on to appear in several of their films.

== Shooting ==
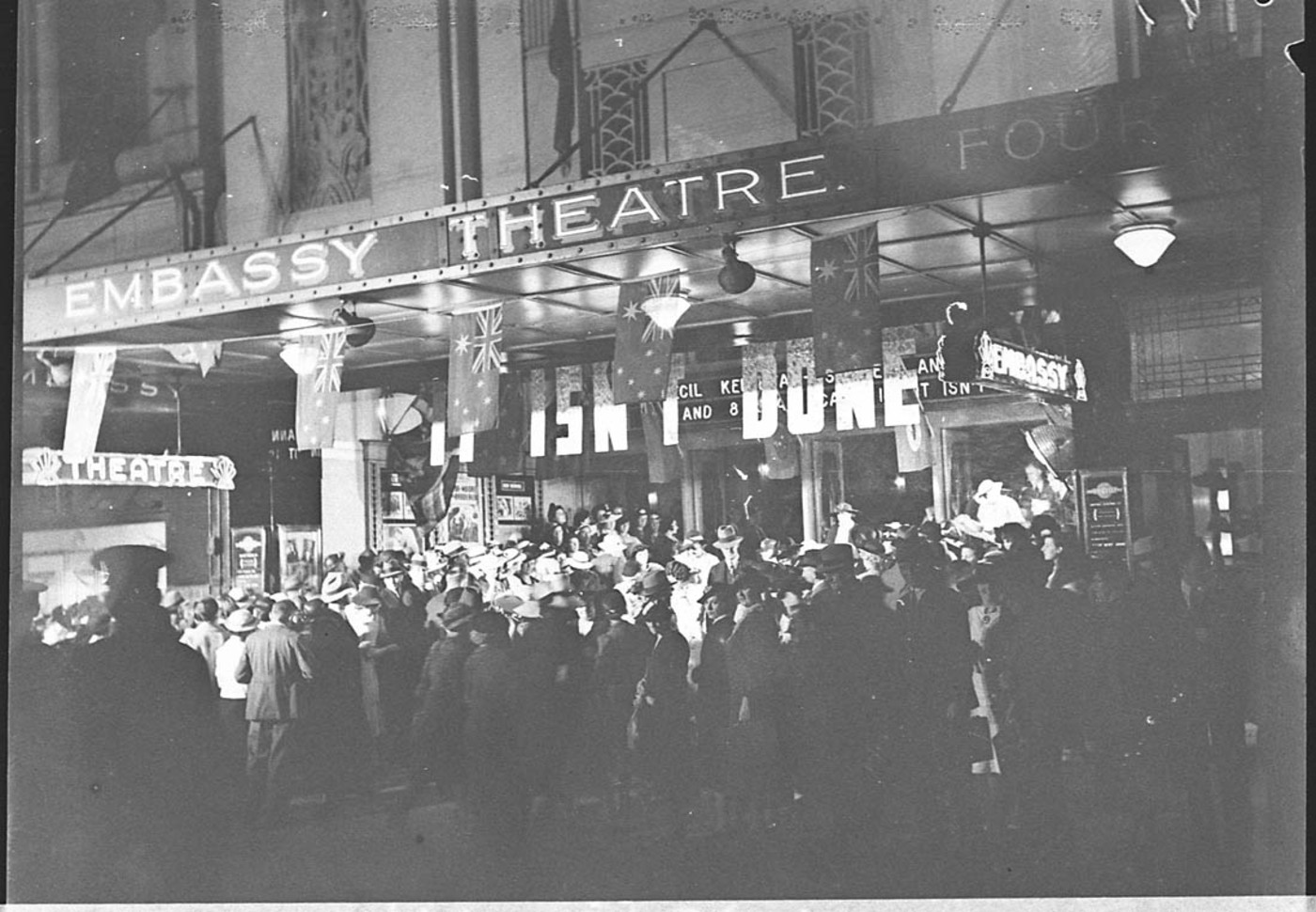
Australian premiere of the film at the Embassy Theatre, Sydney

Although mostly set in England, the film was entirely shot in Australia, at Cinesound's Bondi studios and Camden. Shooting started October 26, 1936.

Hall used rear projection equipment to show English backgrounds. The backgrounds were filmed for Cinesound by British International Pictures.

Sets were designed by Eric Thompson, who had returned to Australia after several years working in Hollywood.

== Reception ==
Reviews were positive

The Motion Picture Herald wrote:

With every new picture, Cinesound is showing a more assured knowledge of production technique. Bearing in mind the pathetically weak Australian pictures of the earlier days of Australian production, the audience that witnessed the preview of "It Isn't Done" found it hard to imagine that the picture they were looking at had been actually made in the Commonwealth. Here, indeed, is a film for which this country need make no apologies. In that respect it is epoch-making.

Variety wrote:

Pic carries no marquee names for abroad but, despite this, the entertainment value is solid.' And the names are okay for Australia and New Zealand. Film breaks away from the 'horse opera' group and portrays a simple,, yet in parts, highly touching story. It is a comedy — not the slapstock type of earlier efforts, but gentle fun. Ken Hall's direction is very smooth and the picture moves along at a nice tempo. Over here 'Done' should experience no difficulty in clicking up a good b.o. take. For England it is also a natural, and American audiences would find pleasure in it, too, if the market is opened to it. Film is not strong enough to stand alone in America, but on a dual it would be quite able to hold its own.

Filmink argued the film "is particularly interesting in its acknowledgement of the cruelties of the world and the sadness of life" and "has definite cultural interest in its depictions of how (some) Australians saw themselves and the British."

=== Box office ===
The film was a big hit at the box office, being released in the US and UK.

Everyone's called it "easily the finest film an Australian company has made."

== Legacy ==
A representative from RKO in Hollywood saw the film and offered Kellaway a long-term contract, which he accepted. Kellaway did return to Australia for one more film, Mr. Chedworth Steps Out, but spent the rest of his career in America. Filmink argued "he never had a vehicle as perfectly constructed for him as It Isn’t Done."

After completing the film, John Longden returned to England after spending four years in Australia. He left Sydney in November, accompanied by Carl Dudley. Dudley later helped Shirley Ann Richards when that actress moved to Los Angeles.

In the film, Shirley Ann Richards plays a woman whose brother was killed in World War I. Richards' brother in real life died in a Japanese POW camp during World War II.
