= Thoroughbred (film) =

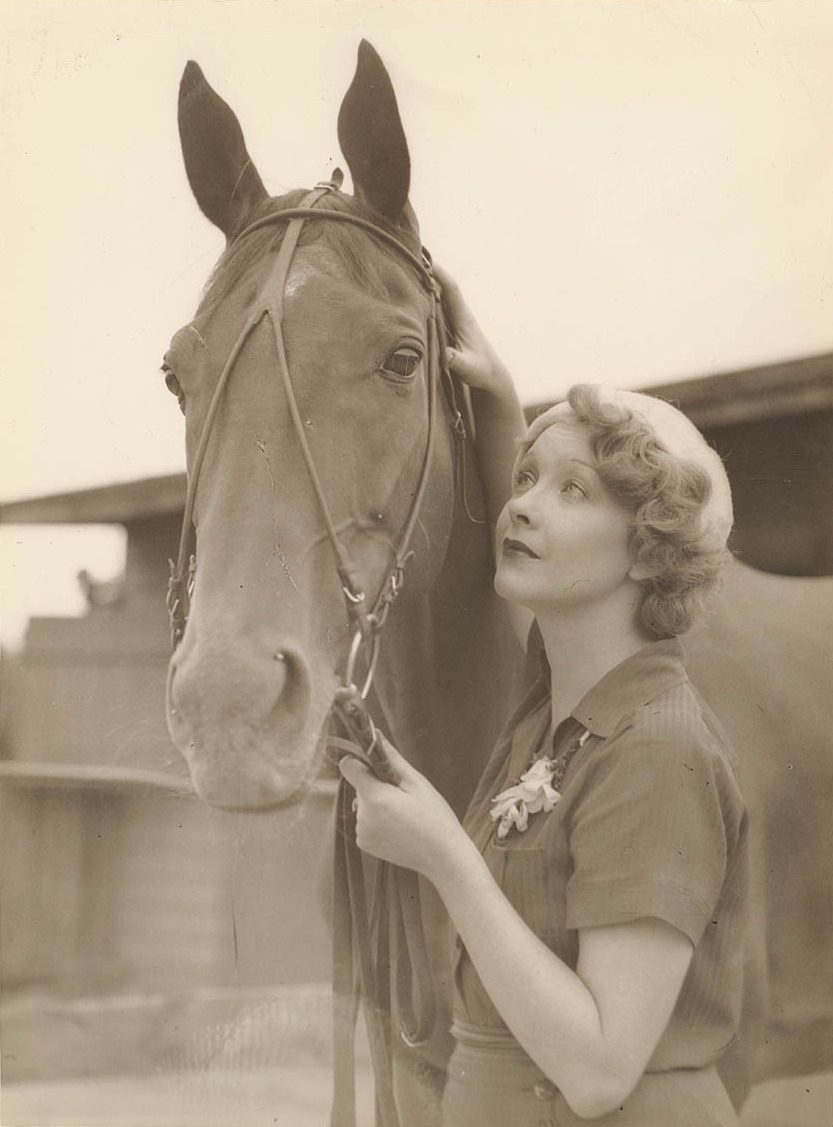
- Helen Twelvetrees during filming of Thoroughbred
- Directed by: Ken G. Hall
- Written by: Edmond Seward
- Produced by: Ken G. Hall
- Starring: Helen Twelvetrees; Frank Leighton; John Longden
- Cinematography: George Heath
- Edited by: William Shepherd
- Music by: Hamilton Webber
- Production company: Cinesound Productions
- Distributed by: British Empire Films
- Release dates: May 1936 (Australia); July 1936 (UK)
- Running time: 89 minutes
- Country: Australia
- Language: English
- Budget: £25,000 or £21,000
- Box office: £25,000

Thoroughbred is a 1936 Australian race-horse drama film directed by Ken G. Hall, partly based on the life and career of Phar Lap. Hollywood star Helen Twelvetrees was imported to Australia to appear in the film. The film also stars Frank Leighton and John Longden.

== Plot summary ==
A Canadian horse trainer, Joan, is the adopted daughter of horse trainer and breeder Ma Dawson. She buys an unwanted thoroughbred colt named Stormalong. Joan nurses the horse back to health with the help of Ma's son Tommy, and Stormalong starts to win races. He becomes the favourite to win the Melbourne Cup which attracts the interest of a gambling syndicate who try to dope the horse and kill it in a stable fire. They then kidnap Tommy prior to the race.

Stormalong manages to participate in the Cup, and although is mortally wounded by a sniper, lives long enough to come first place. Tommy escapes and helps the police capture the gangsters.

== Cast ==
- Helen Twelvetrees as Joan
- Frank Leighton as Tommy Dawson
- John Longden as Bill Peel
- Toby Wing as Anne O'Malley
- Nellie Barnes as Judy Cross
- Elaine Hamill
- Ronald Whelan
- Les Warton
- Harold Meade
- Edmond Seward as Mr Terry

== Production ==
The film was the first made by Cinesound after the studio ceased production in 1935 enabling Hall to visit Hollywood for a number of months. While in Hollywood there he signed contracts with American star Helen Twelvetrees and writer Edmond Seward to work on the film. (Sally Blane and Norman Foster had been originally considered).

He also purchased a rear-projection unit which was used extensively in the film. The budget was originally announced as £25,000.

Twelvetrees was paid £1,000 a week, reportedly the highest salary ever paid by the Australian film industry to an actor. (Another source said £200 a week.) According to Filmink "There was a trend at the time to import third-tier Hollywood names to appear in Australian films; this would generate considerable publicity at home and possibly help overseas sales."

Her co-stars would be Australian leading man Frank Leighton and English actor John Longden who was having an extended stay in Australia. According to Ken G. Hall, Twelvetrees and Leighton had an affair during filming, despite the actress having been accompanied to Australia by her husband and baby. Her husband found out and threatened to kill Leighton. Hall told Stuart F. Doyle who arranged for some detective friends to force Twelvetrees' husband to leave Australia.

This was the first movie with Cinesound for actor Ron Whelan, who joined the company as assistant director and also worked as an actor in several films.

Australia's Prime Minister Joseph Lyons visited the set during filming.

The horses races were shot in part by a camera man being towed on a sled.

The climax is similar to the 1934 Frank Capra film, Broadway Bill. Hall claimed he was unaware of this and blamed it on Seward.

== Reception ==
The film was popular although reviews were mixed, with some criticism of the script.

=== Critical ===
Variety called it a "Good race-track drama when it sticks to the race track... for all its faults (mostly technical), the pic spells pretty fair average entertainment.' Undoubtedly it is the best local turned out to date. "

Filmink called it "an odd film. It’s technically very accomplished, with terrific photography by George Heath (this was his first solo credit as director of photography), impressive production design (from Fred Finlay and J. Alan Kenyon) and a competent cast. Hall’s direction demonstrates his continued improvement." However the story was criticised with "far too much screen time is instead taken up with Frank Leighton’s character" and "there actually isn’t that much horse stuff in the movie – Stormalong barely registers as a character."

=== Box office ===
According to one account the film's box office "was a drop from the big figures of earlier days, but was still satisfactory, considering that an American programme picture will make only from £3,000 to £4,000 in Australia, a special feature up to £10,000, and a super-feature from £20,000 to £25,000, and American pictures cost four or five times as much to produce, compared with Australian. "

=== UK release ===
The film received a release in the UK, but was subject to cuts from the censor on the grounds of scenes depicting cruelty to animals, in particular the stable fire. The movie was not a success at the English box office.

A novelised version of the screenplay sold out within three days, at a rate of 1,000 copies a day.

== See also ==
- List of films about horses
- List of films about horse racing

== Notes ==
Hall, Ken G. Directed by Ken G. Hall: Autobiography of an Australian Filmmaker, Lansdowne Press, 1977
