= Forty Thousand Horsemen =

- Directed by: Charles Chauvel
- Written by: Charles Chauvel; Elsa Chauvel; E. V. Timms
- Produced by: Charles Chauvel
- Starring: Grant Taylor; Chips Rafferty; Pat Twohill
- Cinematography: George Heath; Frank Hurley; John Heyer; Tasman Higgins
- Edited by: William Shepherd
- Music by: Lindley Evans; Alfred Hill; Willy Redstone
- Production company: Famous Feature Films
- Distributed by: Universal Pictures (Australia); Goodwill Pictures Corporation; Monogram Pictures (US)
- Release dates: 26 December 1940 (Australia); 22 August 1941 (UK); 14 August 1941 (US)
- Running time: 100 minutes (Aust); 89 mins (UK)
- Country: Australia
- Language: English
- Budget: £30,000
- Box office: £130,000

Forty Thousand Horsemen (aka 40,000 Horsemen) is a 1940 Australian war film directed by Charles Chauvel. The film tells the story of the Australian Light Horse (mounted rifleman as distinct from cavalry) which operated in the desert at the Sinai and Palestine campaign during World War I. It follows the adventures of three rowdy heroes in fighting and romance. The film culminates in the charge of the Australian Light Horse at the Battle of Beersheba. The film was clearly a propaganda weapon, to aid in recruitment and lift the pride of Australians at home during World War II. It was one of the most successful Australian movies of its day.

== Plot ==
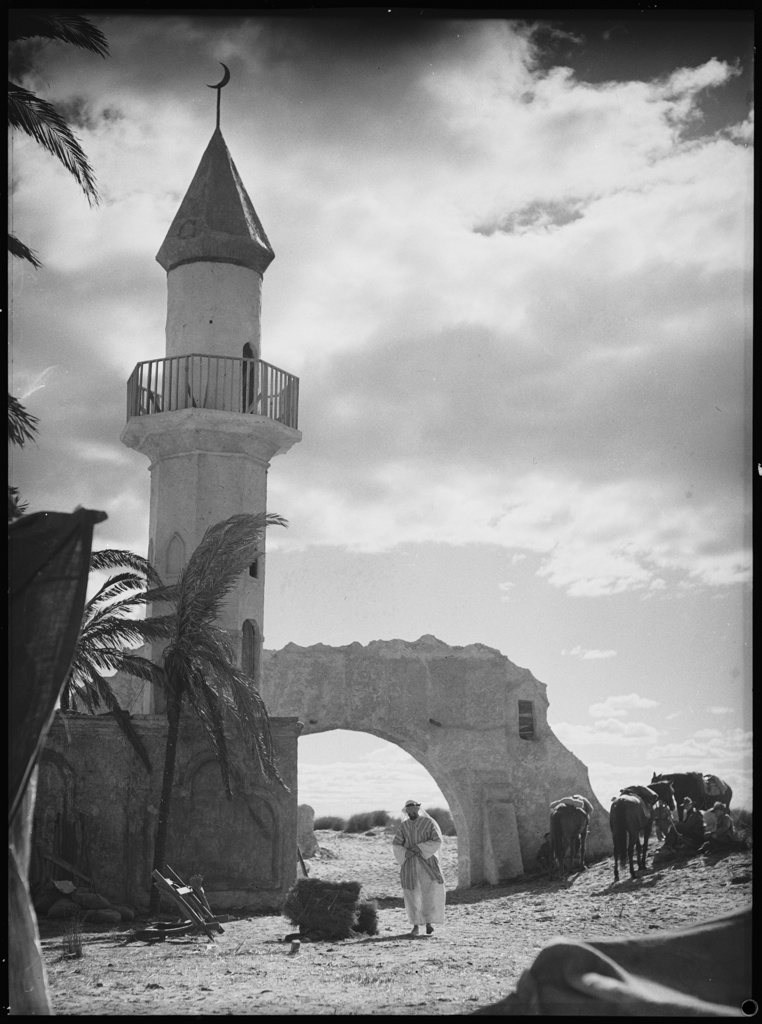
Mosque built on set in Kurnell.

In 1916 Jerusalem, German troops led by Hauptmann Von Schiller arrest French wine seller Paul Rouget for spying and hang him. His daughter Juliet goes into hiding dressed as a boy and starts spying on the Germans.

Three members of the Australian Light Horse, Red, Larry and Jim, are enjoying themselves (including playing a game of two-up) on leave in Cairo, when called to fight the Turks. They take part in several battles including the march to Ogratina and the Battle of Romani. Red is separated from the others after one battle and has his life saved by Juliet, who is disguised as an Arab boy.

Red is reunited with his friends and they arrive at an Arab village. He meets Juliet and realises she saved his life. They begin a romance.

The Battle of Gaza takes place; Jim and Larry are mortally wounded and Red is captured. He is sent to Beersheba to work as slave labour and discovers the town is wired with explosives. Juliet rescues him and they spend the night together in a hut. Red manages to rejoin his unit in time to participate in the charge of the Light Horse at the Battle of Beersheba, and stops Von Schiller before he detonates the explosives. The Germans and Turks are defeated and Red is reunited with Juliet.

== Cast ==
- Grant Taylor as Red Gallagher
- Betty Bryant as Juliet Rouget
- Pat Twohill as Larry
- Chips Rafferty as Jim
- Eric Reiman as Hauptmann Von Schiller
- Joe Valli as Scotty
- Kenneth Brampton as German officer
- Albert C. Winn as Sheik Abu
- Harvey Adams as Von Hausen
- Norman Maxwell as Ismet
- Harry Abdy as Paul Rouget
- Pat Penny as Captain Seidi
- Charles Zoli as Cafe Owner
- Claude Turton as Othman
- Theo Lianos as Abdul
- Roy Mannix as Light Horse sergeant
- Edna Emmett
- Vera Kandy
- Iris Kennedy
- Joy Hart
- Michael Pate as Arab
- Harold (Roy) Phillips as Arab

== Production ==
=== Development ===
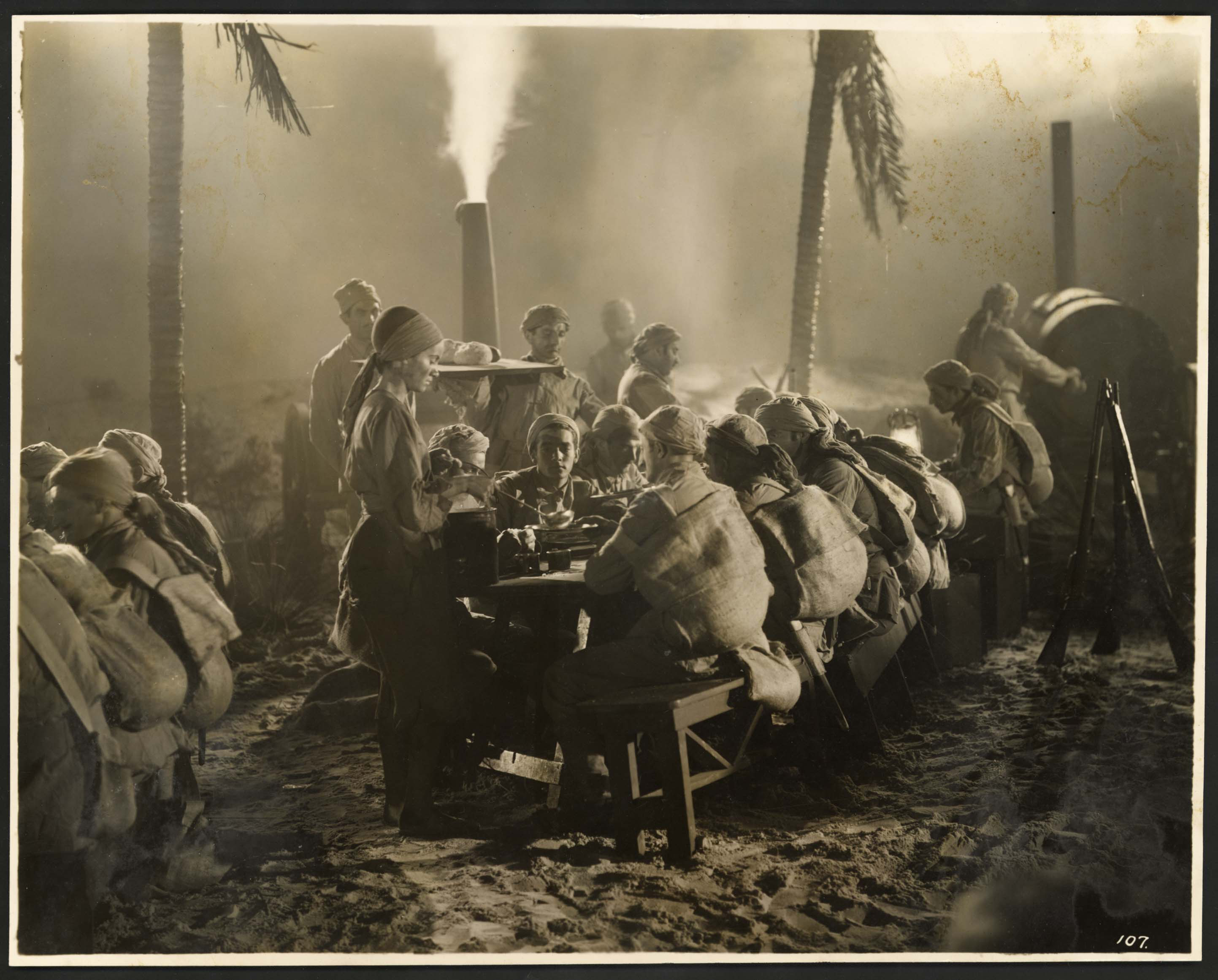
Actors playing Turkish Soldiers set of film Forty thousand horsemen, Cronulla Sydney, 1940

Chauvel was the nephew of Sir Harry Chauvel, commander of the Australian Light Horse during the Sinai and Palestine campaign and had long planned a film based on the exploits of the Light Horse. It was originally to be titled For Services Rendered based on a story by Frank Baker, and then Thunder Over the Desert. A key influence was The Lives of a Bengal Lancer.

To raise funds for the project, Chauvel shot a £5,000 "teaser" sequence, consisting of a cavalry charge based around the Battle of Beersheba. The cost for this was paid for by Herc McIntyre, managing director of Universal Pictures in Australia who was a long-time friend and associate of Chauvel's. Filming of this sequence took place on 1 February 1938 on the Cronulla sand dunes using a cavalry regiment of the Australian Light Horse, which had been performing in the New South Wales sesquicentenary celebrations. The charge was filmed by a four-camera unit, composed of Frank Hurley, Tasman Higgins, Bert Nicholas and John Heyer.

In 1939 Chauvel and McIntyre formed Famous Films Ltd to make the film. Chauvel used the teaser footage to raise the budget, which was originally announced at £25,000. £5,000 was provided by McIntyre and £10,000 from Hoyts. The New South Wales government agreed to guarantee a bank overdraft of £15,000 although they did not invest directly.

=== Casting ===
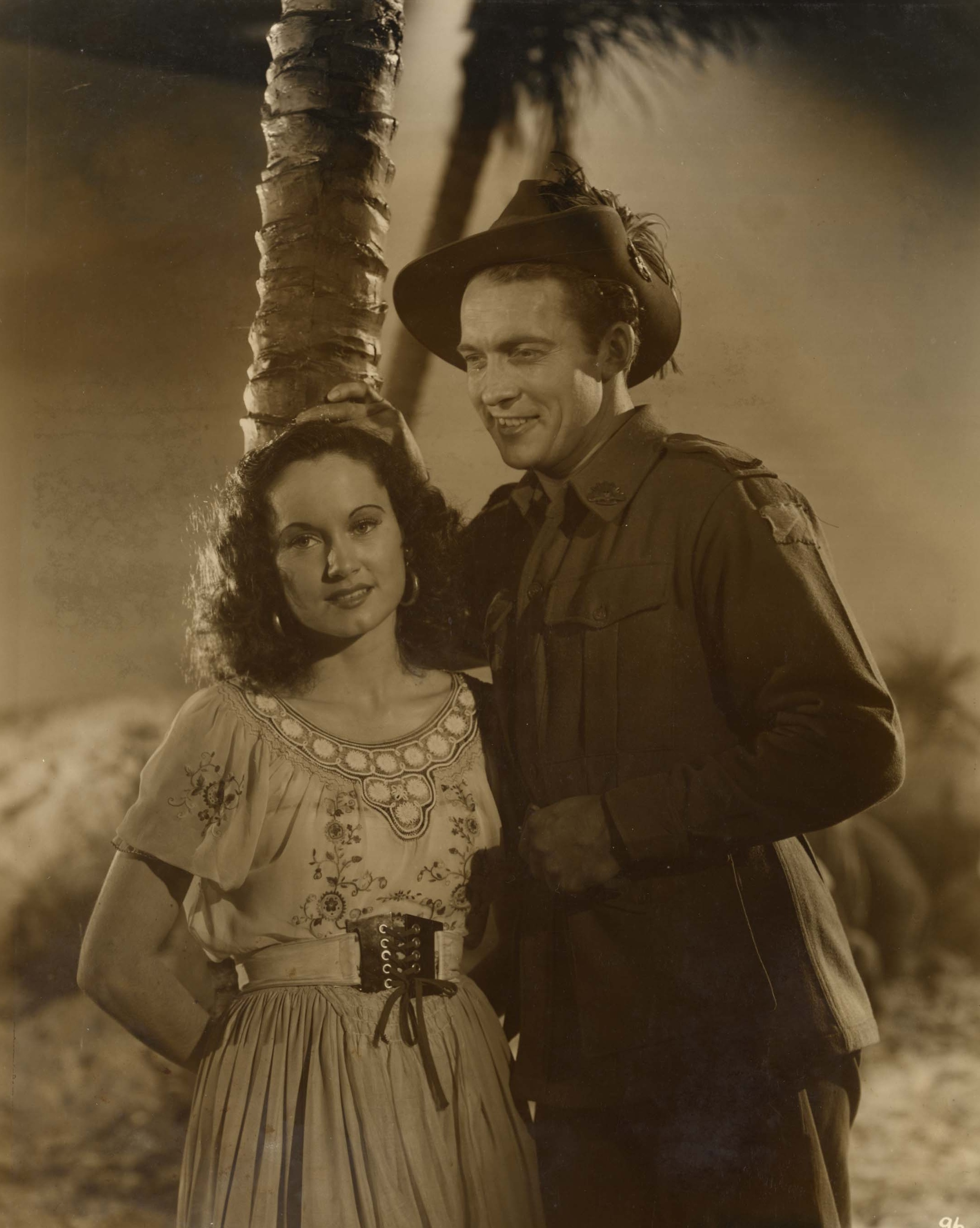
Grant Taylor and Betty Bryant on the set of film Forty thousand horsemen

The film marked the first leading role for Grant Taylor, who had risen to prominence in Dad Rudd, MP (1940). It was also the first sizeable role for Chips Rafferty, who had been cast after a screen test. Chauvel described him as "a cross between Slim Summerville and James Stewart", with a "droll yet natural humour." Joe Valli reprised his Scottish soldier role from Pat Hanna's Digger Shows.

Taylor was paid £15 a week, Rafferty £10 a week.

Betty Bryant was a discovery of Elsa Chauvel's and was cast as Juliet Rouget.

=== Shooting ===
Shooting began in May 1940. Interiors were shot in the Cinesound studios at Bondi which Chauvel leased from Cinesound Productions for a three-month period. A second unit was used to build a desert village at Cronulla. The battle scenes were shot there in July and August, using the 1st Light Horse (Machine Gun) Regiment and the 30th Battalion.

== Censorship ==
After the film's preview, the Commonwealth film censor, Creswell O'Reilly, requested three major cuts – display of the dancing girls in a cabaret, the love scene between Red and Juliette in a hut, and alleged cruelty to horses during the final charge. This threatened Chauvel's ability to export the film and screen it in Victoria. Eventually the Minister for Customs, Eric Harrison, overruled the decision and allowed the movie to be screened uncut. The movie was also passed uncut in Victoria.

== Release ==
=== Critical ===
Reviews were overwhelmingly positive. The critic from The Sydney Morning Herald claimed that "there have been some good Australian films before this one, but Forty Thousand Horsemen has every right to be regarded as the first really great Australian picture."

In 2019, film historian Stephen Vagg suggested that "the film was Taylor's. There had been other notable leading men in Australian films – Snowy Baker, Errol Flynn – but it was really Taylor who was the first tough Aussie star type, that would be so exemplified by Rod Taylor, Jack Thompson, Mel Gibson and Bryan Brown."

=== Box office ===
The film was a massive success at the box office, grossing £10,000 within its first three weeks of release, enabling Famous Features Ltd to buy out the interest of the New South Wales government for £15,000. The film was seen by 287,000 people in Sydney alone during a ten-week run on first release. Filmink argued "It’s easy to see why this movie was such a hit – it’s full of energetic spirits, action and romance, plus beautiful photography and unabashed nationalism: ‘Waltzing Matilda’ plays constantly, everyone loves Australians, Aussie soldiers are depicted as brave, loyal, admired by their enemies and allies and get to have sex with hot French girls, etc, etc."

Female lead Betty Bryant was sent to Singapore for the film's premiere in June 1941. While there she met MGM executive Maurice Silverstein, whom she would later marry, leading to her retirement from acting.

=== Foreign release ===
The film was released in the US by Sherman S. Krellberg for Monogram Pictures and was very well received.

"Yippee for brawling, boisterous entertainment", wrote a critic for The New York Times, praising Betty Bryant ("whatever it is that leaps across the celluloid barrier, she has") although claiming the story was "foolish". The Los Angeles Times reported the film was "conventional in formula but enlivened by stirring battle scenes – and new faces." "Contains all the color and lusty vigor of the men themselves" said The Washington Post.

In the UK the film earned over £40,000. In 1954 the film was cut down to 50 minutes for a US television version.

Charles Chauvel attempt to repeat the film's success with The Rats of Tobruk which contained many of the same elements as Horsemen but it did not do as well.

== The Lighthorsemen ==
A new movie version of the battle was made in 1987 as The Lighthorsemen, directed by Simon Wincer. Six years later, George Lucas produced an episode of the Young Indiana Jones Chronicles featuring the battle, also directed by Simon Wincer. The episode reuses footage from Wincer's own film.
