= Will Mahoney =

American actor (1894–1967)

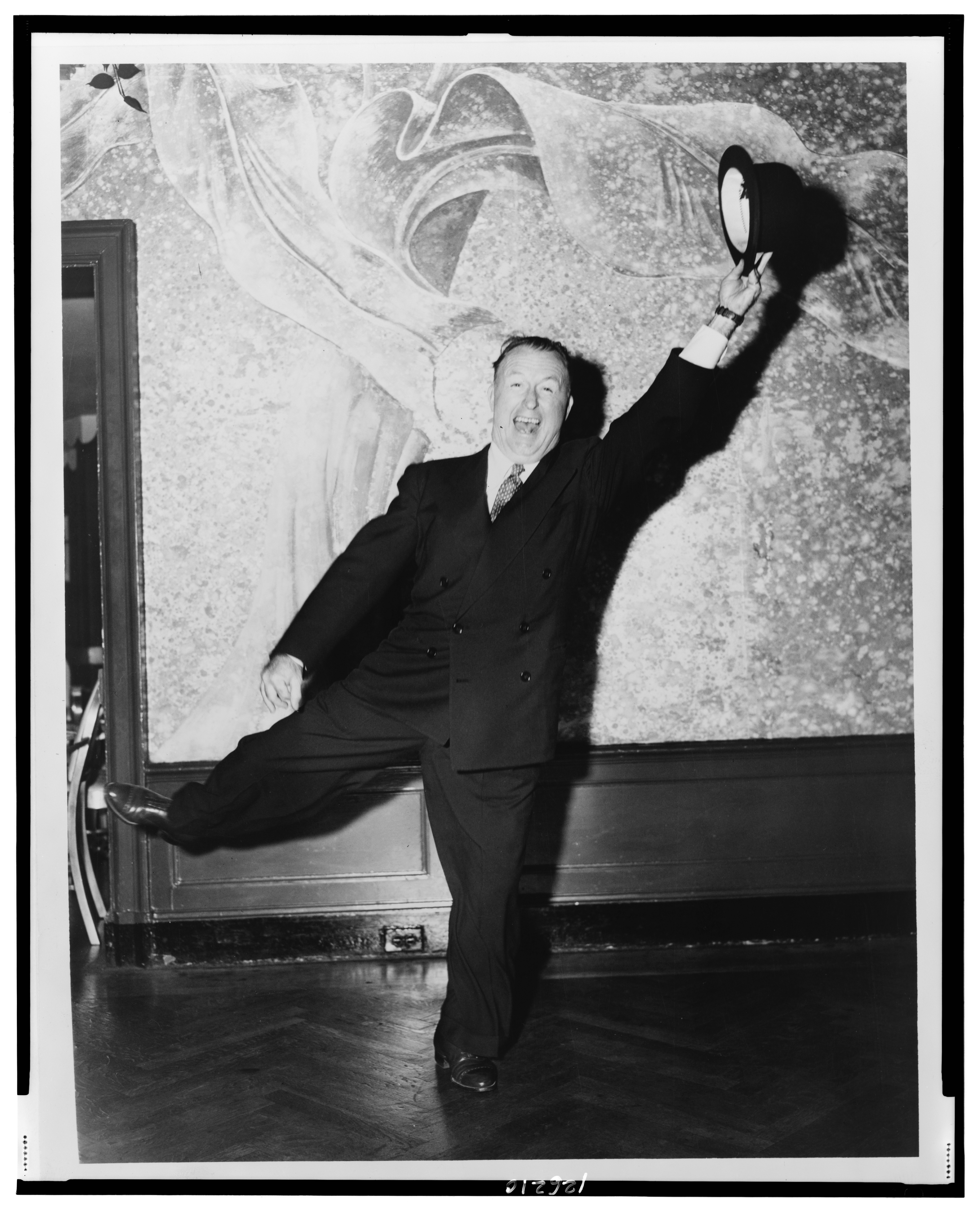
- Mahoney in 1956
- Born: William James Fitzpatrick Mahoney; February 5, 1894; Helena, Montana, U.S.
- Died: February 9, 1967 (aged 73); Melbourne, Victoria, Australia
- Occupation(s): Vaudevillian performer, stage actor, theatre manager
- Spouse: Evie Hayes (m. 1938)

William James Fitzpatrick Mahoney (February 5, 1894 – February 9, 1967) was an American vaudevillian performer, stage actor and theatre manager who later had a successful stage career in Australia.

== Early life ==
He was born in Helena, Montana, to rancher Michael Fitzpatrick and Mary Moran. His father died when he was two and his mother who had two children, Frank and Mary from a previous marriage, supported the family by holding several jobs.

== Career ==
After making his first public appearance at the age of eight in Spokane, Washington, Mahoney along with his brother Frank devised an act called the Mahoney Brothers; they toured the United States, Mexico and Australia. Will Mahoney came to New York in about 1921, and as a tap and clog dancer and singer became a frequent performer in vaudeville there from the mid-1920s, displaying "a disarmingly joyous insouciance and gusto."

In 1930, he first performed his signature act, dancing along an outsize xylophone and playing it with hammers attached to his feet. In 1931, Mahoney was featured in The Earl Carroll Vanities. He had extensive experience on the vaudeville circuit in the US, becoming the highest paid variety star in the country by the early 1930s, when he arrived in Australia with fellow American star and future wife Evie Hayes. They acted in the film Come Up Smiling in 1939, after which he became a theatre manager in Australia of the Cremorne Theatre in Brisbane. The theatre was successful and many of Mahoney's US friends attended including Bob Hope, Jack Benny, Gary Cooper and Artie Shaw, amongst others. Mahoney was also popular in Britain, and performed there on radio. He also made British films.

After the war, Mahoney went back to the USA to revitalize his career, being nominated for a Tony Award in 1956 for a revival of Finian's Rainbow before eventually settling permanently in Australia, in Melbourne in 1958, playing in musicals and revues and teaching a generation of young performers. He died in Melbourne on February 9, 1967.

== Personal life ==
Mahoney was married three times, he first married at age 21 to Iva Mildred Willis and toured England appearing in films. After his wife's death in 1920 he married Sue Lillian Wilson in 1922, whom he later divorced and then married actress Evie Hayes in 1938 who appeared in his numerous stage show productions. They immigrated to Australia and were featured on the Tivoli Circuit.
