= Evie Hayes =

American actress

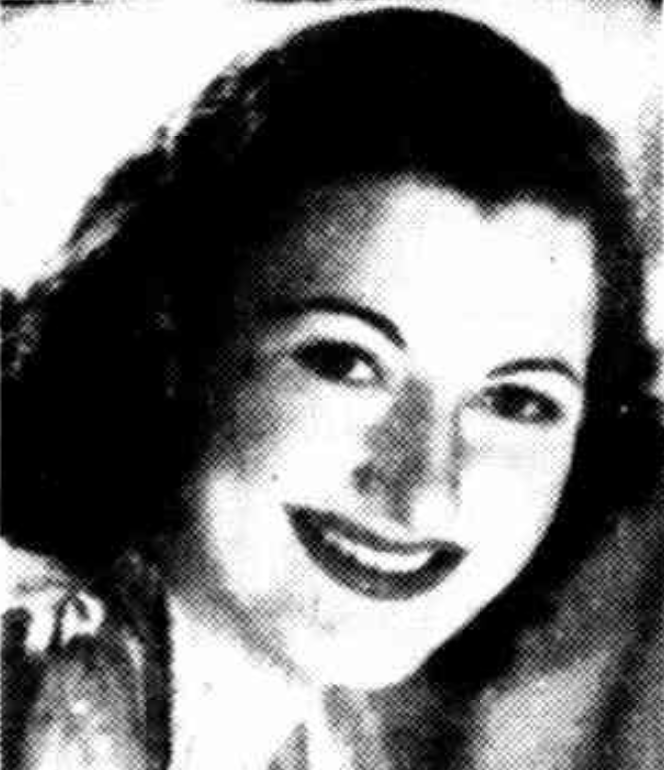
- Evie Hayes in 1940
- Born: Vina Evelyn Hayes; 1 June 1912; Seattle, Washington, United States
- Died: 26 December 1988 (aged 76); Melbourne, Victoria, Australia
- Other name: Evie Mahoney
- Occupations: Actress, singer, TV presenter
- Years active: 1916–1988

Vina Evelyn Hayes (1 June 1912 – 26 December 1988), better known as Evie Hayes, was an American-born actor and singer, best known for her stage success in Australia. She was once described as "the most popular box office attraction in Australian musical comedy since Gladys Moncrieff."

== Biography ==
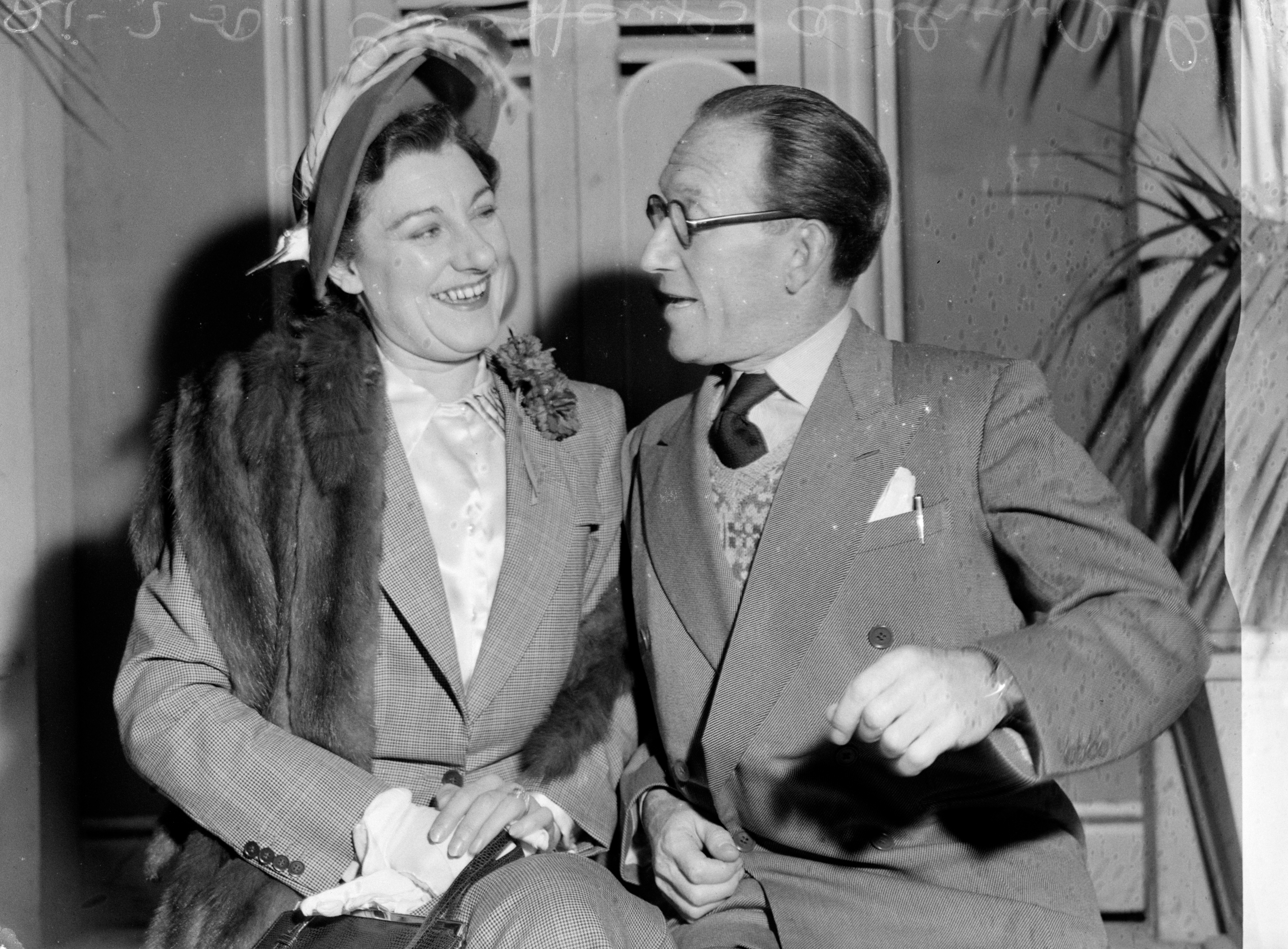
Evie Hayes and Arthur Askey, Sydney, 1950

Hayes was born in Seattle to George Hayes and Eva Upton, a soubrette. In 1928, while attending Seattle's Blessed Sacrament High School, Hayes was already acting, taking a part as the artist in the Senior Play, "The Ninth Promise."

She appeared on stage from an early age and worked steadily in vaudeville, radio and nightclubs. Having moved to New York, she worked as a song plugger at the publishing house of Irving Berlin. She was the leading lady for Will Mahoney in his tour of the United Kingdom and Europe, sang on the BBC, appeared in cabaret, and made her own recordings. In 1930, she had a role in the musical comedy film Hold Everything, and had other minor roles in musicals

Hayes married Mahoney at a Registry Office in Westminster, London on March 26, 1938, and the couple travelled to Australia to appear on the Tivoli circuit. They proved very popular, eventually deciding to stay in the country permanently. They appeared in the film Come Up Smiling (1939), and managed the Cremorne Theatre in Brisbane, presenting revues, pantomimes and musicals. They entertained the American and Australasian troops during World War II, and raised funds for the war effort. Hayes played the lead role in the Australian production of Annie Get Your Gun, which ran for more than three years.

On television from its inception, Hayes was a compere, singer, comedian and a commercial presenter on the Graham Kennedy show In Melbourne Tonight. Despite being diagnosed with multiple sclerosis in 1969, she continued her career, appearing regularly on television, including as a judge on light entertainment program Young Talent Time. She also opened her own talent school, and acted in productions of Mata Hari, The Flame of Istanbul, Funny Girl, Kiss Me, Kate, a revival of Oklahoma! and Call Me Madam.

Hayes died of a heart attack, early in the morning of 26 December 1988, in Melbourne, Victoria.

== Filmography ==
- Come Up Smiling (1939) (Kitty Katkin)
- Caravan Holiday (short) (1972)
