= Come Up Smiling =

1939 film by William Freshman

- Theatrical release poster
- Directed by: William Freshman
- Screenplay by: William Freshman
- Story by: Ken G. Hall (as "John Addison Chandler")
- Produced by: Ken G. Hall
- Starring: Will Mahoney; Shirley Ann Richards
- Cinematography: George Heath
- Edited by: William Shepherd
- Music by: Henry Krips
- Production company: Cinesound Productions
- Distributed by: British Empire Films (Australia); Ambassador (UK)
- Release date: 3 November 1939 (Tasmania)
- Running time: 77 minutes (Australia); 65 mins (UK); 71 mins (Aust re-release)
- Country: Australia
- Language: English
- Budget: £22,000

Come Up Smiling (also known as Ants in His Pants) is a 1939 Australian comedy film starring popular American stage comedian Will Mahoney and his wife Evie Hayes. It was the only feature from Cinesound Productions not directed by Ken G. Hall.

== Synopsis ==
Barney O'Hara is a performer in a touring carnival. He runs a sideshow act with his daughter, Pat, and ex-Shakespearean actor, Horace Worthington Howard, which is struggling to make money. One of the main attractions is Pat's voice.

One day Pat is invited to sing at a party held by Colonel Cameron and his daughter Eve, but her voice fails her. A specialist tells Barney that Pat requires an expensive operation.

To raise the money, Barney agrees to fight a boxer known as 'The Killer'. He is helped in his training by dancer Kitty Katkin. On the day of the fight, ants are slipped into Barney's shorts, causing him to defeat the Killer. He wins the money to enable Pat to have her operation.

== Cast ==
- Will Mahoney as Barney O'Hara
- Shirley Ann Richards as Eve Cameron
- Evie Hayes as Kitty Katkin
- Jean Hatton as Pat
- Sidney Wheeler as Worthington Howard
- Alec Kellaway as 'The Killer'
- Guy Hastings as Colonel Cameron
- John Fleeting as John Wynyard
- Ronald Whelan as Max
- Harry Abdy as Sharkey
- Lou Vernon as Signor Rudolpho
- Harold Meade as Sir James Hall
- Charles Zoli as Rudolpho's valet
- Bob Geraghty as pressman
- Jack Dunleavy as referee
- George Lloyd as man in crowd
- Chips Rafferty as man in crowd (extra)
- Charles Tingwell as extra
- Owen Weingott as extra

== Production ==
The film was developed as a star vehicle for popular comedian Will Mahoney, an American vaudevillian who toured Australia successfully in 1938. Ken G. Hall also hired Mahoney's regular co-stars, his wife Evie Hayes and manager, Bob Geraghty. Mahoney had previously made a British film Said O'Reilly to MacNab.

Hall hoped that Mahoney's appeal would help the film outside Australia:

This is the most important contract that has been signed at Cinesound as Mahoney is the highest paid star we have ever signed up. In fact, I think he's the highest paid stage artist ever to have toured Australia. It is only the improved conditions of the Australian film industry, due to recent legislation, that has made it possible for us to enlarge our production budget. If any artist can carry an Australian film to overseas markets, it's Will Mahoney.

Mahoney later said, "I think I'll be a big success in this film, but don't get me wrong. It's only because I'm playing myself and I feel I know me pretty well." He described his role a "a nice little bloke trying to make something of himself." Filmink argued "the fact that Hall wanted to build a vehicle around him was indicative of Cinesound’s ambition. Stars of his earlier comedies were not known outside Australia or New Zealand – but a Will Mahoney movie might, in theory, have a chance of making inroads overseas."

In June 1939 it was announced the film would be called Come Up Smiling and would be the first film from Cinesound Productions not directed by Hall. The writer-director, William Freshman, was born in Australia but had been working in the British film industry. Freshman was hired along with his wife, scriptwriter Lydia Hayward.

"We are now planning bigger things, as we are well able to do, by reason of the additional time at my disposal", said Hall at the time. "Opportunity will be taken to find big subjects from which to make big pictures – like Robbery Under Arms, which I expect to direct personally, Overland Telegraph, Eureka Stockade, and others of that calibre, though not all necessarily historic." (None of these movies ended up being made by Hall.)

The Freshmans arrived in Australia in April 1939 and the script was ready by June. Hall later wrote that Freshman "seemed to lack the vital comedy sense we needed, but he was a good constructor in a general way of screenplay writing. The boxing ring sequence was, I think, one of the funniest things we did at Cinesound."

=== Casting ===
The romantic leads were played by Cinesound regular Shirley Ann Richards and John Fleeting. Fleeting had previously appeared in Gone to the Dogs (1939). Singing star Jean Hatton appeared in her second movie, after Mr. Chedworth Steps Out (1938). Filmink argued the love story "goes nowhere without any conflict; indeed, Richards and Fleeting could be cut out of the film entirely without any impact on the story."

The film is known as the first featuring future Australian filmstar Chips Rafferty (as an uncredited extra). Ken G. Hall insists he cast Rafferty in Dad Rudd MP and used him afterwards in reshoots he did on Come Up Smiling (see below). However Raffety says he was cast in this film first as a "hayseed" through the assistant casting director.

=== Shooting ===
Filming began in late June 1939.

The movie was mostly shot at Cinesound's Bondi studios, with carnival scenes filmed at the Sydney Showground. An estimated 16,000 extras were used.

A week into filming, Jean Hatton was injured falling down two flights of stairs but managed to recover.

The fight scene reportedly took ten nights to film with audiences of one thousand a night.

Adolph Zukor of Paramount visited the set during filming in August. He had seen Dad and Dave Come to Town on the boat out to Australia and was so impressed by its quality that he asked to visit Cinesound. Zukor watched Hall direct a sequence of Come Up Smiling and told reporters, "I watched that director at work and he certainly seems to be fully conversant with film technique. I've been pleasantly surprised with what I have seen to-day. I didn't expect to find anything like the facilities that this studio possesses. I would say that Clnesound is just as good as anything we have to Hollywood." Filming was completed on 1 September.

A half hour radio special promoting the film broadcast on 17 September.

A patriotic song "It's Up To You It's Up to Me" was included in the film.

The film opened in Tasmania in November 1939.

== Ants in His Pants ==
According to Hall, the film was not an immediate success at the box office so he had it re-cut and re-released as Ants in His Pants, adding a new song to explain the title. This decision was announced mid November.

Hall said in December, "It is hot an unusual procedure, as many American pictures change titles on release When the film was run through for executives, Mahoney's comedy musical number. 'I've Got Ants In My Pants' was so successful it was agreed that it should be stressed In the title."

According to one journalist "Personally it seemed that "Come Up Smiling" was a good title — but who knows? The crowds may find the predicament Of the ants and the owner of the pants a far greater lure."

The retitled film was released on 29 December.

=== Reception ===
The Sydney Morning Herald said " There is nothing in "Ants in His Pants" that a boy oftwelve could fail to appreciate.... Will Mahoney on the stage used to be colossal fun.... But on the screen he provides only meandering entertainment."

The Sun said "The picture makes no contribution to the important! side of Australian production. It is pure slapstick, the story being a thread on which to hang a variety entertainment, given principally by Will Mahoney."

Smith's Weekly said the film "has the marking of a Hollywood piece of work — not a very good l-lollywood work, but nevertheless not deserving of that terrible label: "typically Australian." It has decided polish, and some of the stadium-scenes are decidedly amusing — thanks to the technicians. In fact it's a credit to the technical department of Cinesound— cutters, effectmen, and sound-men — rather than to any special b'illiance of its stage people. Only Mahoney stands clearly out."

The Bulletin said "Cinesound’s latest gift to the nation is not its best work by any means, chief fault being one that has hindered several earlier productions—disjointedness and a tendency to cram too much into the film. There’s no reason why comedy, villainy, songandance and the thread of a plot shouldn’t be the components of a good filmplay, but they should be blended to-gether to run in perfect accord and carry the whole set-up with them. In “Ants in His Pants” each ingredient seems to remain a separate part, each seems to butt in on the other and be played out to its utmost length, and, consequently, each seems a too-obvious artifice to pad the film out to a respectable running-time. "

Variety called it "happy hokum".

According to Hall, the movie performed much better on re-release. "It was quite successful too after a bad start. It was well received on television because it’s a funny picture —- that fight scene, for example, with Alec Kellaway and little Will Mahoney."

Filmink called it "a bright, energetic movie, full of excellent performances. Mahoney is a lively star, Hatton very sweet, Wheeler fun as always, Richards as lovely as ever (even if wasted in her nothing part), Evie Hayes has a splendid musical number, and Alec Kellaway wonderful as a Shirley Temple-loving boxer."
