= William Freshman =

Australian film director (1902–1980)

William Freshman (1 November 1902, in Sydney, Australia – 1980 in London, England) was an Australian-born actor, scriptwriter and director. He moved to England as a child and worked in the British film industry, writing over 20 screenplays and working as an associate producer at British International Pictures. He also wrote the play The Last of the Ladies.

In 1939 Freshman returned to Australia with his screenwriter wife Lydia Hayward under contract to Cinesound Productions for whom he directed Come Up Smiling (1939). It was announced that he and Hayward would make two more films for the studio, an adaptation of the books Overland Telegraph and Robbery Under Arms, but during World War II feature film production at Cinesound came to a halt and the films were not made. It was reported that he did some work in Dad Rudd, MP (1940). He and his wife returned to England shortly after the outbreak of World War II and were back in London by June 1940.

He died in London, England, in 1980, aged 77.

== Selected filmography ==
- The Fifth Form at St. Dominic's (1921)
- Creation (1922)
- Widecombe Fair (1928)
- The Guns of Loos (1928)
- Glorious Youth (1929) – actor
- A Broken Romance (1929) – actor
- The Night of Terror (1929)
- Greek Street (1930)
- Bachelor's Baby (1932)
- Lucky Blaze (1933)
- Love's Old Sweet Song (1933)
- The Scarlet Pimpernel (1934) – actor
- Limelight (1936)
- Spring Handicap (1937) – writer
- Aren't Men Beasts! (1937)
- Jane Steps Out (1938)
- Hold My Hand (1938)
- Come Up Smiling (1939) – director, writer
- The Man at the Gate (1941)
- Teheran (1947) – director
