= Lloyd Hughes (actor) =

American actor (1897–1958)

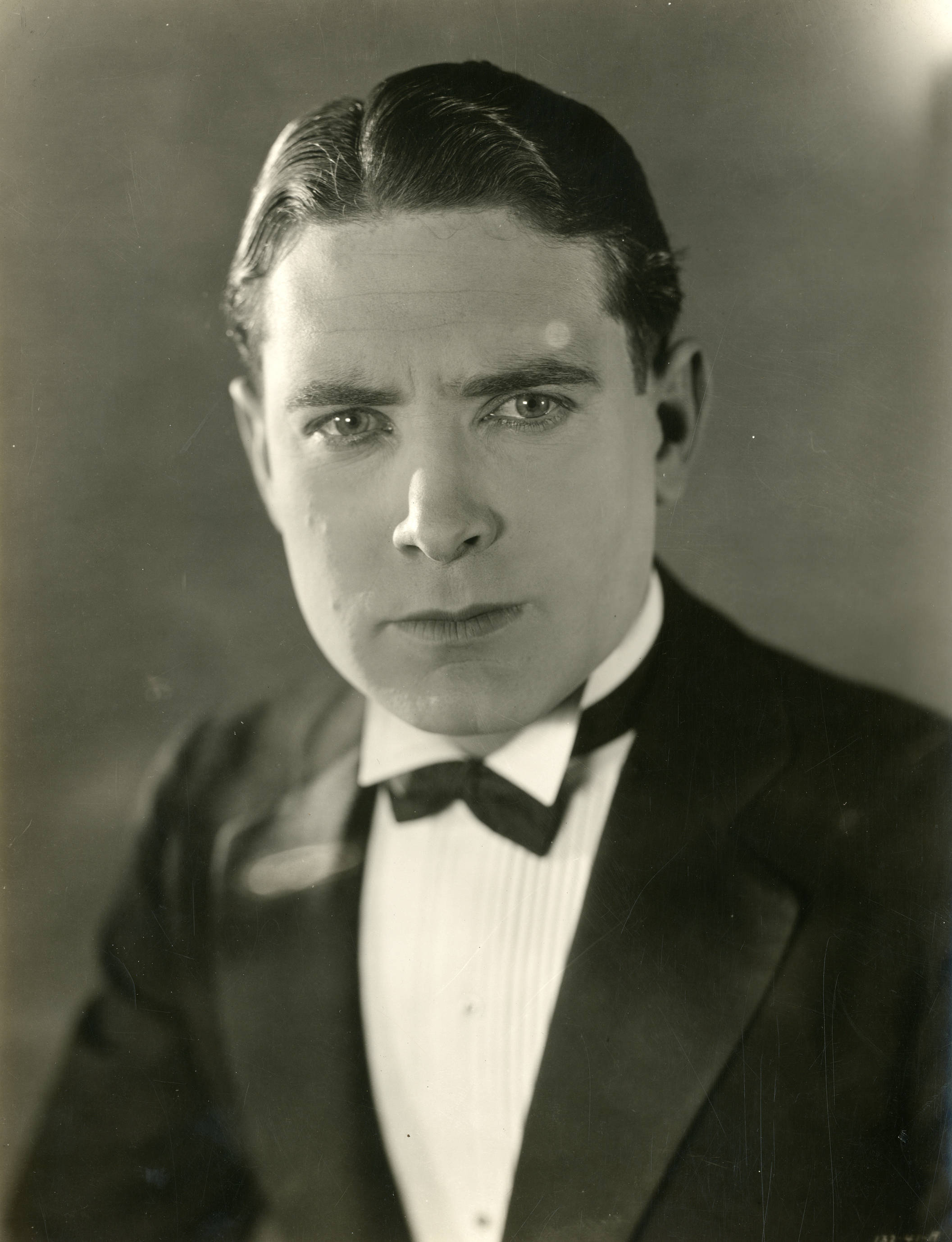
- Hughes in 1923
- Born: October 21, 1897; Bisbee, Arizona Territory, U.S.
- Died: June 6, 1958 (aged 60); San Gabriel, California, U.S.
- Occupation: Actor
- Years active: 1918–1939
- Spouse: Gloria Hope (m. 1921)
- Children: 2

Lloyd Ellsworth Hughes (October 21, 1897 – June 6, 1958) was an American actor of both the silent and sound film eras.

== Life and career ==
Born in Bisbee, Arizona Territory, Hughes received his education at the Los Angeles Polytechnic School. He sought a career as an actor early in life, and his clean-cut appearance and ability soon gained him recognition. His first role as leading man was opposite Mary Pickford in Tess of the Storm Country. Other roles included Love Never Dies opposite Madge Bellamy, and The Lost World with Wallace Beery and Bessie Love. He made the transition to sound, and worked as an actor through the late 1930s, including a role with John Barrymore in the 1930 film, Moby Dick.

Hughes made two films in Australia in 1937 for Ken G. Hall and Cinesound Productions: Lovers and Luggers and The Broken Melody. According to Filmink "There was a trend at the time to import third-tier Hollywood names to appear in Australian films; this would generate considerable publicity at home and possibly help overseas sales."

Hughes met his wife, Gloria Hope, on the set of Tess of the Storm Country. The couple had two children: a boy, Donald, and a girl, Isabel. Lloyd Hughes died on June 6, 1958, at the age of 60.

== Filmography ==
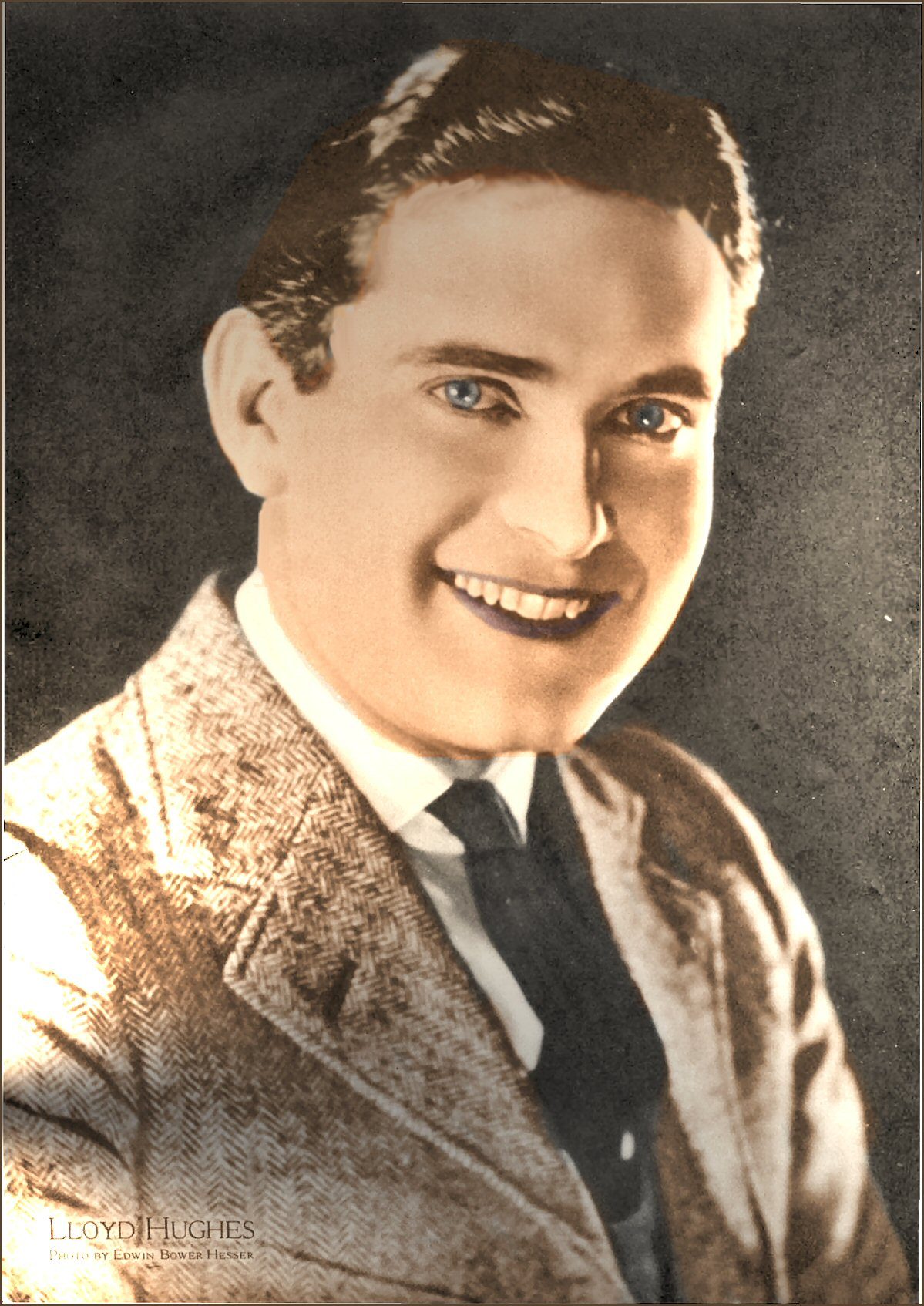
Hughes, c. 1922

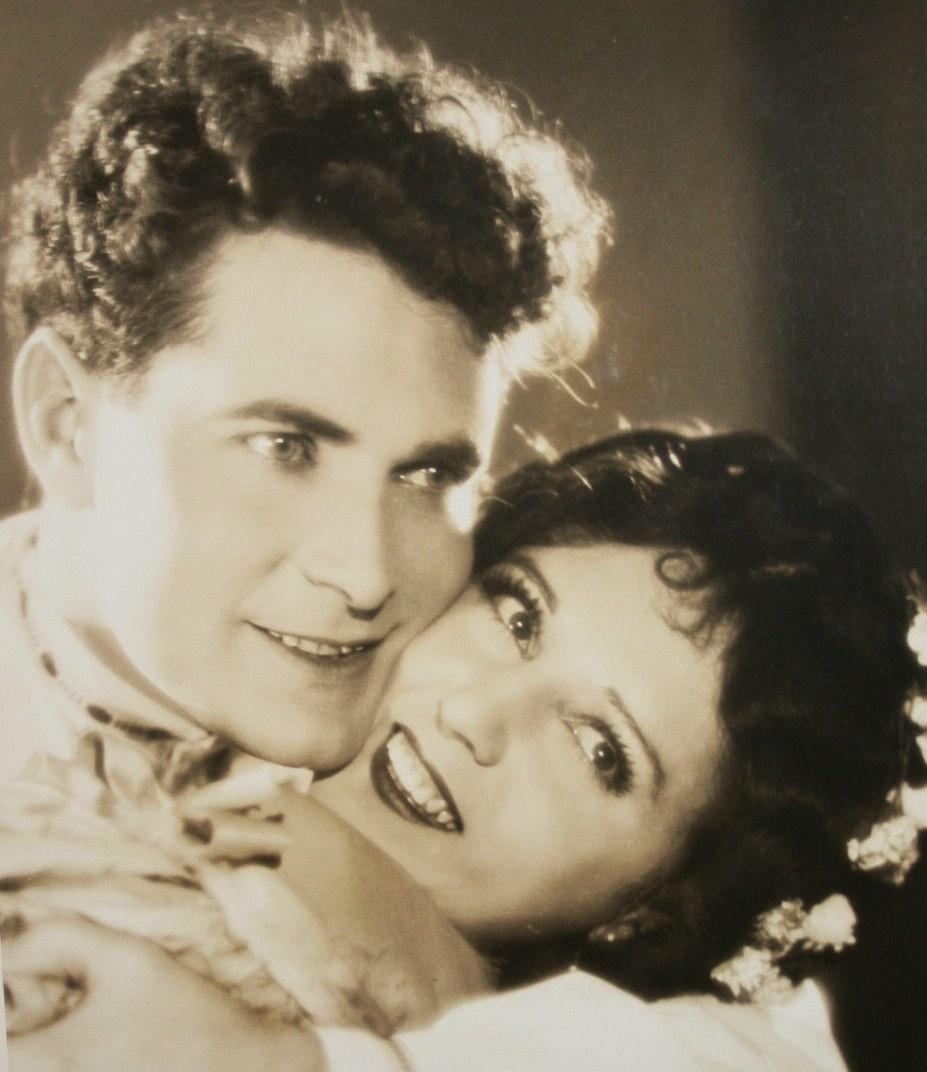
With Jacqueline Gadsden in The Mysterious Island (1929)

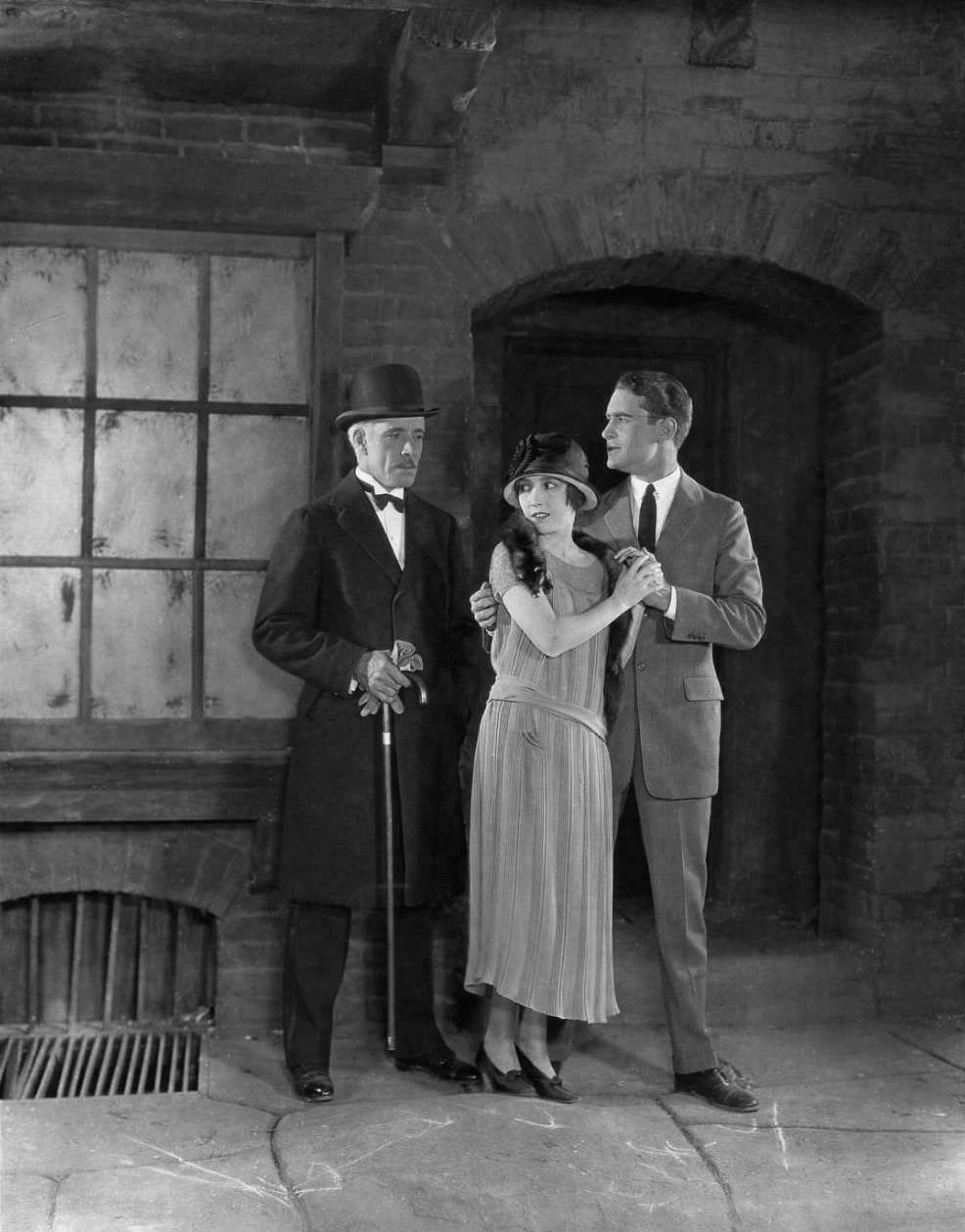
With Lewis Stone and Bessie Love in The Lost World (1925)

- Old Wives for New (1918)
- The Heart of Humanity (1918)
- The Indestructible Wife (1919)
- Satan Junior (1919)
- The Turn in the Road (1919)
- The Haunted Bedroom (1919)
- An Innocent Adventuress (1919)
- The Virtuous Thief (1919)
- Dangerous Hours (1919)
- Homespun Folks (1920)
- Below the Surface (1920)
- The False Road (1920)
- Hail the Woman (1921)
- Love Never Dies (1921)
- Mother o' Mine (1921)
- Beau Revel (1921)
- Tess of the Storm Country (1922)
- The Old Fool (1923)
- Her Reputation (1923)
- The Huntress (1923)
- Children of Dust (1923)
- Are You a Failure? (1923)
- Scars of Jealousy (1923)
- The Dixie Handicap (1924)
- In Every Woman's Life (1924)
- Welcome Stranger (1924)
- The Sea Hawk (1924)
- The Whipping Boss (1924)
- Untamed Youth (1924)
- Heritage of the Desert (1924)
- Judgment of the Storm (1924)
- Scarlet Saint (1925)
- The Half-Way Girl (1925)
- The Desert Flower (1925)
- Declassée (1925)
- Sally (1925)
- The Lost World (1925)
- If I Marry Again (1925)
- Valencia (1926)
- Ladies at Play (1926)
- Forever After (1926)
- Pals First (1926)
- Ella Cinders (1926)
- High Steppers (1926)
- Irene (1926)
- No Place to Go (1927)
- American Beauty (1927)
- The Stolen Bride (1927)
- Too Many Crooks (1927)
- An Affair of the Follies (1927)
- Heart to Heart (1928)
- Three-Ring Marriage (1928)
- Sailors' Wives (1928)
- Acquitted (1929)
- The Mysterious Island (1929)
- Where East Is East (1929)
- Extravagance (1930)
- Big Boy (1930)
- Sweethearts on Parade (1930)
- Moby Dick (1930)
- The Runaway Bride (1930)
- Hello Sister (1930)
- Love Comes Along (1930)
- Air Eagles (1931)
- The Deceiver (1931)
- Ships of Hate (1931)
- Sky Raiders (1931)
- A Private Scandal (1931)
- Hell Bound (1931)
- The Drums of Jeopardy (1931)
- The Heart Punch (1932)
- The Miracle Man (1932)
- The Man Who Reclaimed His Head (1934)
- Midnight Phantom (1935)
- Rip Roaring Riley (1935)
- Harmony Lane (1935)
- Skybound (1935)
- Reckless Roads (1935)
- Society Fever (1935)
- Honeymoon Limited (1935)
- Ticket or Leave It (1935)
- Social Error (1935)
- A Man Betrayed (1936)
- Kelly of the Secret Service (1936)
- The Little Red Schoolhouse (1936)
- A Face in the Fog (1936)
- Night Cargo (1936)
- Clipped Wings (1937)
- Blake of Scotland Yard (1937)
- Lovers and Luggers (1937)
- The Broken Melody (1937)
- I Demand Payment (1938)
- Numbered Woman (1938)
- Romance of the Redwoods (1939)
