= Sidney Wheeler =

Australian actor (1864–1950)

Sidney Wheeler (1864–21 July 1950) was an English-Australian actor who worked extensively in film, TV and radio. He worked a number of times for Ken G. Hall. His film debut was made in Lovers and Luggers.

He was named as a co-respondent in a divorce case.

Wheeler collapsed on stage appearing in Annie Get Your Gun in July 1950 and died shortly afterwards.

== Select film credits ==
- Lovers and Luggers (1937)
- Dad and Dave Come to Town (1938)
- Mr Chedworth Steps Out (1938)
- Come Up Smiling (1939)
- The Power and the Glory (1941)

== Select radio ==
- Bullets or Ballots (1941)
- Judge Marshall's Family (1945)
- The Woman in the Window (1946)
- Written for a Lady (1949) - won Macquarie Radio Award
- Major Barbara (1950)

== Select stage appearances ==
- Dearest Enemy (1931)
- Ball at the Savoy (1935)
- Maid of the Mountains
- Annie Get Your Gun (1949–50)
