= George Heath (cinematographer) =

Australian cinematographer

George Heath (1901 - 1968) was an Australian cinematographer best known for his collaboration with Ken G. Hall for whom he shot several features. According to one observer, he fitted into the Cinesound world far more than his predecessor, Frank Harley - "Heath adapted much more easily to studio work and soon developed into a technician of world class. His work on the features was always attuned to the demands of the film and its future audience: his images show few of the pretensions to grandeur which are to be found in the work of Hurley, and instead his photography is clear, expressive and undemanding."

== Selected filmography ==
- Strike Me Lucky (1934)
- The Burgomeister (1935)
- Grandad Rudd (1935)
- Thoroughbred (1936)
- Orphan of the Wilderness (1936)
- It Isn't Done (1937)
- Tall Timbers (1937)
- Lovers and Luggers (1937)
- The Broken Melody (1938)
- Let George Do It (1938)
- Dad and Dave Come to Town (1938)
- Gone to the Dogs (1939)
- Come Up Smiling (1939)
- Mr. Chedworth Steps Out (1939)
- Dad Rudd, MP (1940)
- 40,000 Horsemen (1940)
- The Rats of Tobruk (1944)
- Smithy (1946)
- Bush Christmas (1947)
- Eureka Stockade (1949)
- Bitter Springs (1950)
- Wherever She Goes (1951)
- The Phantom Stockman (1953) - also producer
- The Forerunner (1957) - short
