= Harvey Adams =

Australian actor

Harvey Adams (1889, Warrington, England – 1960, Australia) was an English actor and director who worked extensively in film, stage and radio.

He moved to Australia in 1924 for work after a long career, played leading man for Muriel Starr from 1925 to 1930, in later years also serving as producer for many of her shows, and for other companies after she left in 1930, earning a reputation for meticulous attention to detail. He remained in Australia for most of the rest of his life.

== Filmography ==
Year	Title	Role	Notes
1934	Clara Gibbings	Justin Kerr	
1937	It Isn't Done	Jarms	
1937	Tall Timbers	Stephen Burbridge	
1938	Mr Chedworth Steps Out	Mason	
1940	Forty Thousand Horsemen	Von Hausen	
1954	His Majesty O'Keefe	Herr Friedlander	
1954	Long John Silver	Sir Henry Strong	
1958	His Excellency		TV movie
1959	On the Beach	Sykes	Uncredited, (final film role)
