= Stuart Doyle =

Australian film producer (1887–1945)

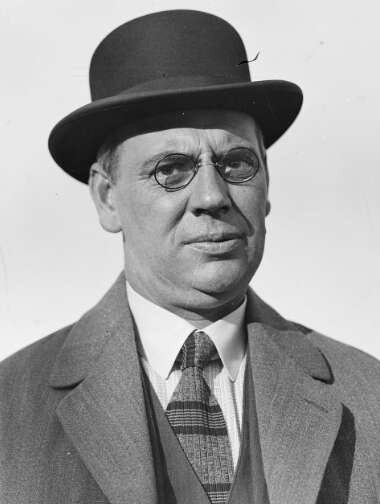
- Doyle in 1928
- Born: 1 December 1887; Leichhardt, New South Wales, Australia
- Died: 20 October 1945 (aged 57); Wahroonga, New South Wales, Australia
- Occupations: Cinema Owner; company director and manager; managing director; film producer; radio station owner; showman

Stuart Frank Doyle (1 December 1887 – 20 October 1945) was an Australian radio and theatrical entrepreneur.

== Early life ==
He was born to English parents in Leichhardt, New South Wales, on 1 December 1887.

== Career ==
He joined Union Theatres and Australasian Films and worked his way up to managing director, establishing the Capitol Theatre and State Theatre in Sydney as well as the State Theatre in Melbourne. He also helped lead the 1929 campaign against the Federal amusement tax which contributed to the fall of the Bruce-Page government.

In 1929 along with Sir Benjamin Fuller he helped found the Australian Broadcasting Company which was taken over by the government in 1932 and became the Australian Broadcasting Commission. He then set up the Commonwealth Broadcasting Corporation which acquired Sydney radio station 2UW. He was also part of the establishment of the Australian Powerboat Association.

The Great Depression caused the demise of Union Theatres and Doyle instead established Greater Union Theatres, and its production arm, Cinesound Productions. He appointed his former assistant, Ken G. Hall, to run Cinesound, which began successfully with On Our Selection a property selected by Doyle.

Financial over-expansion saw Doyle forced out of the company by Norman Rydge and he resigned in June 1937.

== Death ==
Doyle died suddenly with cardio-vascular disease at his home at Wahroonga on 20 October 1945 and was buried in the Anglican section of South Head cemetery.
