= Norman Rydge =

Australian businessman (1900–1980)

Sir Norman Bede Rydge CBE (18 October 1900 – 14 May 1980) was an Australian businessman.

== Biography ==
Rydge was born in Sydney to blacksmith William Henry Rydge and Margaret, née McSweeney. He attended Woollahra Superior Public School and Fort Street Boys' High School before becoming a clerk in the Master of Lunacy's Office in February 1916. In 1918 he left the public service and became an accountant, publishing a book in 1921 on federal income tax and another on the Sydney stock exchange. He had become associate of the Commonwealth Institute of Accountants by 1924.

He married Alys Noad, a musician, on 3 July 1926 at Ashfield; that year he also served as mayor of Canterbury. He also became involved in the hotel business, running the Carlton Hotel on Castlereagh Street from 1925 and becoming chairman of Usher's Metropolitan Hotel Ltd, the Pacific Hotel and Mockbell's Ltd. In 1936 he became managing director of Menzies Hotel in Melbourne and also directed Waldas Shoes Ltd.

In 1928 he established Rydge's Business Journal. He became a significant stock market figure through his company Carlton Investments Ltd. After 1936 he entered the cinema business, becoming managing director of Greater J. D. Williams Amusement Co. Ltd. and Greater Union Theatres Ltd., returning them to profit and establishing Greater Union as an international brand. He began to sell his hotel interests in the mid-1940s to focus on cinema; he was later commissioner of the Rural Bank of New South Wales (1961–75).

He has been called a "toxic influence on the Australian film industry" because of his lack of support of Australian filmmaking in particular that "the most successful Australian film studio in history was needlessly wiped out at its artistic peak under Rydge’s watch."

== Personal life ==
Rydge divorced his wife in October 1939 after she left him for another man. He married Vincent Lillian Colefax, a nurse, on 28 December 1939 at Paddington. In September 1949 she and her five-year-old son died, and the following month the coroner found that she had killed her son and committed suicide by carbon monoxide poisoning. Rydge married Phoebe Caroline McEwing, a secretary, on 13 November 1950 at Marrickville.

A United Australia Party member, Rydge ran for the Australian House of Representatives seat of Parramatta against sitting UAP member Sir Frederick Stewart in 1940, without success. He later joined the Liberal Party, but he maintained contacts on the Labor side of politics. He received government appointments from both Robert Askin's Liberal administration and Neville Wran's Labor one.

He was appointed Commander of the Order of the British Empire in 1955 and knighted in 1966. From 1969 he was president of the Museum of Applied Arts and Sciences' trustees, and served as a life governor for the Australian Institute of Management, the Royal Prince Alfred Hospital, and the Alfred and Royal Children's hospitals in Melbourne.

Sir Norman Rydge died in 1980, aged 79, and was cremated.
