= Cinesound Productions =

Australian film production company

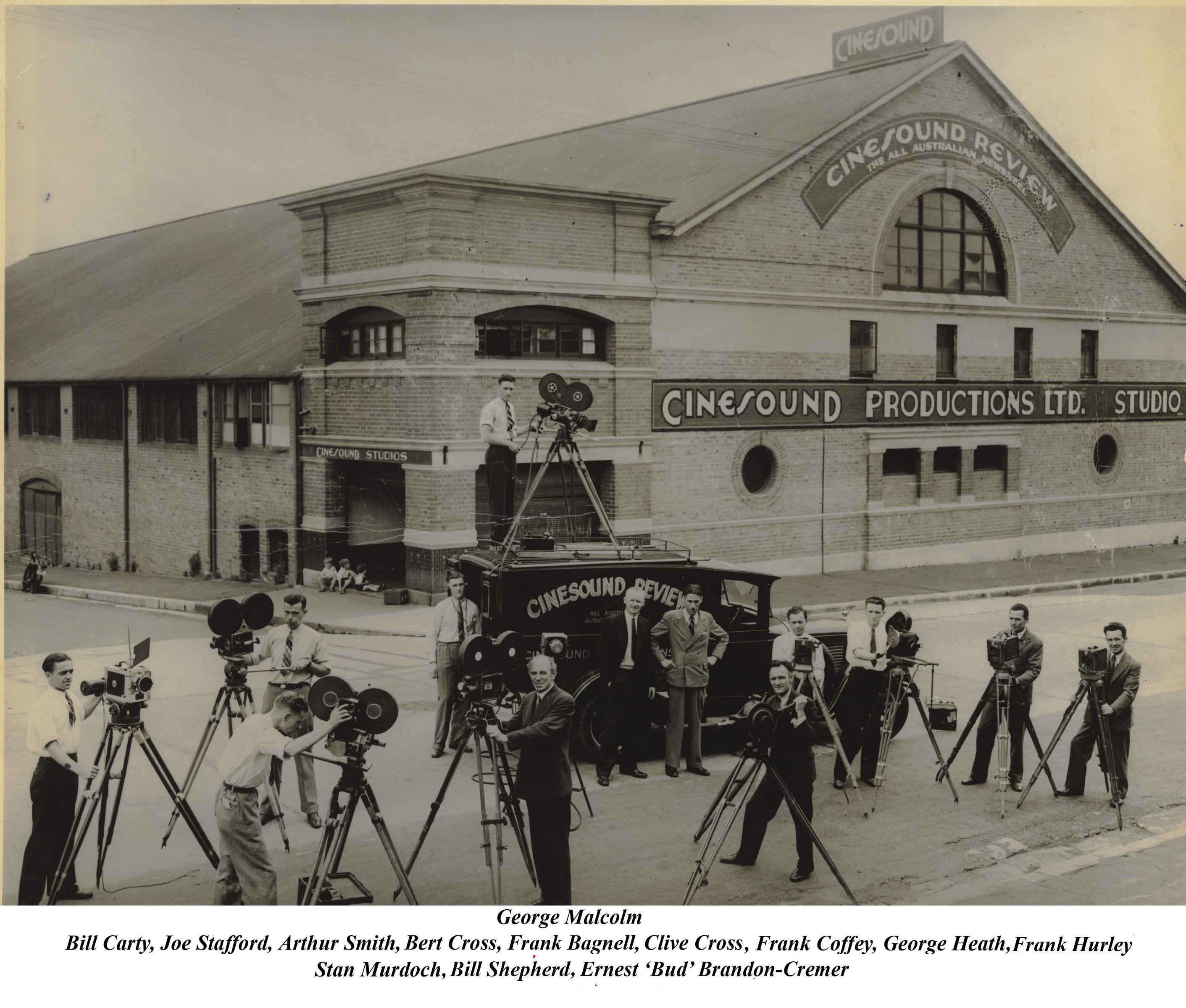
1931 Cinesound Studio 1 in Bondi Junction, Sydney and Crew

Cinesound Productions Pty Ltd was an Australian feature film production company. Established in June 1931, Cinesound developed out of a group of companies centred on Greater Union Theatres that covered all facets of the film process, from production to distribution and exhibition. Cinesound Productions established a film studio as a subsidiary of Greater Union Theatres Pty Ltd based on the Hollywood model. The first production was On Our Selection (1932), which was an enormous financial success.

== Establishment ==
Cinesound Productions mobile unit, Moore Park, New South Wales, 1934

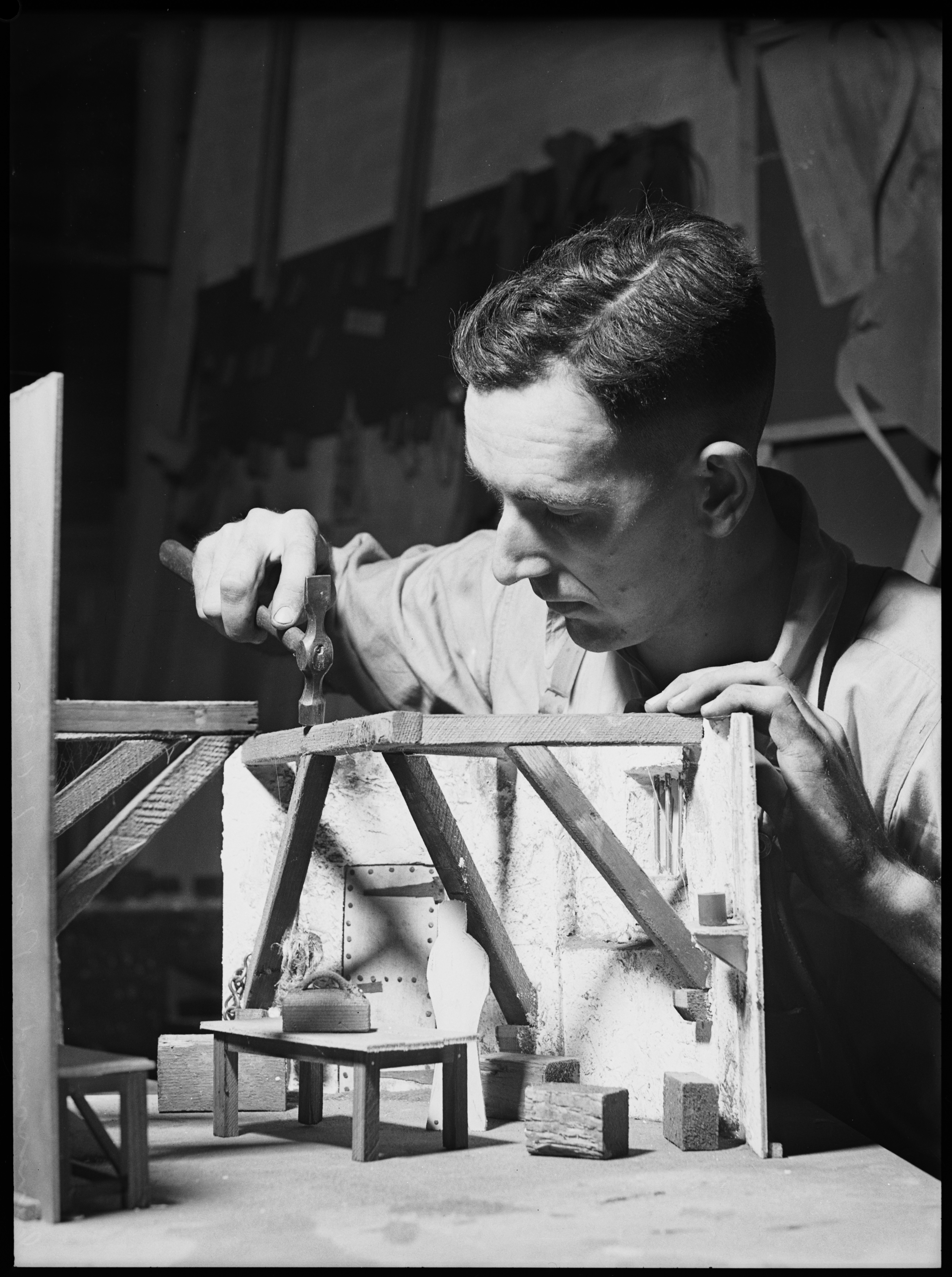
Building a miniature film set at Cinesound, Sydney, 1938

Stuart F. Doyle and Ken G. Hall were the major figures involved in the establishment of Cinesound in 1931. Stuart Doyle was the Managing Director of Greater Union Theatres, which stemmed from Australasian Films, and it was his desire to encourage an Australian film industry that provided the impetus for Cinesound to develop. Doyle appointed his then personal assistant, Ken Hall, to the position of General Manager of Cinesound, and also put him in charge as supervisor of production. In this role, Ken Hall directed all but one of the seventeen films that Cinesound produced and also handled the business affairs of the company. Hall continued to lead Cinesound until 1956.

By 1934, Cinesound had three film studios in Australia, the original location at Bondi Junction and Rushcutters Bay in New South Wales and St. Kilda, Victoria. The Centennial Roller Skating Rink was purchased by Australasian Films/Union Theatres at 65 Ebley Street Bondi Junction in 1925 and began making silent films. The income from the rink was still required to subsidise the film making so the site was used by skaters at night and for filmmaking by day. The Bondi Junction location was known as Studio no. 1 with an additional two studios located in Rushcutters Bay and St. Kilda. Both Doyle and Hall were very committed to the notion of showmanship, which encompassed ideas relating to the type of entertainment the public would want to enjoy, and how to effectively publicise that entertainment to the masses. The publicity campaign for The Squatter's Daughter, and its star Jocelyn Howarth, was particularly imbued with this concept. They were also interested in creating a star system along Hollywood lines promoting the idea that Cinesound was a "little Hollywood". It was this dedication to showmanship that led to all but one of Cinesound's feature films making a profit from the first release, and all of the films eventually at least broke even. In 1939 Hall said that the budgets of Cinesound films were usually between £10,000 and £20,000, and estimated that his first fourteen films had earned £350,000 at the box office.

== Corporate history ==
In 1933 Doyle announced he hoped to make 16 films at their various studios over the next 18 months. This never happened although the success of On Our Selection (1932) and The Squatter's Daughter (1933), along with the proposed introduction of quotas for Australian films in the mid-1930s, saw Cinesound become bullish about expansion. They increased the size of their studio to make Strike Me Lucky (1934), and announced a series of future productions, including Grandad Rudd and an adaptation of the novel Robbery Under Arms, as well as several films produced in Queensland over the next two years, one set in the cattle industry, another in the cane fields and a third on the Great Barrier Reef. It was proposed Cinesound would make 12 movies a year in the first year of the quota: four "super productions", four "quota specials", and four independent Cinesound productions. There was also talk of establishing a studio in Melbourne at St Kilda.

In 1936 they announced they would make six films a year, with one unit devoted to shooting outdoor movies.

In the end the quotas did not prove effective enough to support such a program, although Cinesound kept making movies until 1940.

=== Profitability ===
Year	Date	Profit	Notes
1933	30 June	£4,010	Enormously successful release of On Our Selection
1934	30 June	£8,800	Continued receipts from On Our Selection plus successful release of The Squatter's Daughter
1935	30 June	£4,220	Successful release of The Silence of Dean Maitland followed by box office disappointment of Strike Me Lucky, and popularity of Grandad Rudd. Cinesound stops production for six months to enable Ken G. Hall to study production methods in Hollywood.
1936			Release of Thoroughbred. Stuart Doyle announces Cinesound's films will earn 60% of their money in Australia and New Zealand, and 40% in England.
1937		Loss of £5,254	All of Greater Union's divisions suffered a loss during this period. In June 1937 Stuart Doyle resigns.
1937	31 December	£2,788	Profits earned for a six-month period, partly from It Isn't Done and Tall Timbers.
1938	2 July	£7,647	Cinesound was affected by an amendment to the Cinematograph Films Act 1938 British film legislation which meant that Australian films no longer counted as "British" under the local quota. This saw the loss of a guaranteed market for Cinesound films, which normally sold for £6,500 – £7,500 to Britain, and forced the studio to make more broad-based comedies.
1938	31 December	£10,010	Successful release of Let George Do It and Dad and Dave Come to Town.
1939		£936	
1940		£2,821	Last Cinesound feature film produced, Dad Rudd, MP.
1941		£1,242	
1942		£5,018	
1943		£4,973	
1944	31 December	£7,223	
1945	31 December	£1,392	
1946	31 December	£1,433	
1947	31 December	£6,012	
1948	31 December	£3,355	

In February 1939 a company was registered, Cinesound Features Pty. Ltd., a subsidiary of Cinesound Productions Pty. Ltd, to produce the feature productions of the parent company. The directors of the new company were the same as Cinesound Productions: Norman Rydge, Edwin Geach, and John Goulston.

== Talent school ==
Cinesound established a talent school for young actors in 1938. Run by George Cross and Alec Kellaway (who acted in many Cinesound films), it offered training in "deportment, enunciation, miming, microphone technique and limbering." By 1940 the school had had over 200 students, including Grant Taylor and Yvonne East, who featured in Dad Rudd, MP (1940), plus Valerie Scanlon, Lorna Westbrook, Natalie Raine, and Mary Sinclair.

== 1940s ==
Cinesound Productions produced feature films until the Second World War, when it was considered that feature films were too great a financial risk to undertake. Cinesound then concentrated on producing the Cinesound Review, a newsreel that they had been generating to exhibit alongside their feature films.

After the war, the British businessman J. Arthur Rank bought a controlling interest in Greater Union, and used the theatre chain primarily to exhibit British films, including those from the Rank Organisation, whilst discouraging local feature production. Hence Cinesound never regained its place as a major local film producer, and Australian film production was almost non-existent for the next two decades.

In 1940 the Australian Government decided to channel news footage to the public through the existing newsreel companies, Cinesound and Movietone. In the same year Cinesound abandoned feature production for the duration of the war. By this stage it was estimated Cinesound films had earned £400,000 at the box office.

In 1942 Cinesound provided the operational base for the film unit of the US Signal Corps to prepare newsreels for viewing to American troops in the South West Pacific theatre of the war.

In 1946 arrangements were made with the commercial film distribution companies to distribute selected Commonwealth Film Unit productions in Australian cinemas on a commercial basis. Similar arrangements existed for the release of general sponsored documentaries produced by Movietone and Cinesound.

Other Australian producers were almost totally deprived of access to commercial cinema screens.

Despite the success of Ken G Hall's last feature, Smithy (1946), which was backed by Columbia Pictures as a means of repatriating frozen currency held in Australia due to wartime restrictions, Greater Union Theatres decided not to resume post-war production through Cinesound.

== Feature films ==
- On Our Selection (1932)
- The Squatter's Daughter (1933)
- The Silence of Dean Maitland (1934)
- Strike Me Lucky (1934)
- Grandad Rudd (1935)
- Thoroughbred (1936)
- Orphan of the Wilderness (1936)
- It Isn't Done (1937)
- Tall Timbers (1937)
- Lovers and Luggers (1937)
- The Broken Melody (1938)
- Let George Do It (1938)
- Dad and Dave Come to Town (1938)
- Gone to the Dogs (1939)
- Come Up Smiling (1939)
- Mr. Chedworth Steps Out (1939)
- Dad Rudd, MP (1940)

== Short films ==
- Thar She Blows! (1931)
- That's Cricket (1931)
- Cinesound Review (weekly newsreel) (1931–1975)
- Cinesound Varieties (1934)
- 100,000 Cobbers (1942)
- South West Pacific (1943)

== Unmade films ==
Various films were announced for production by Cinesound that were not made, including:

- a talking version of For the Term of His Natural Life, which was previously filmed by Australasian Films in 1927
- Con of the South Seas based on a novel by Beatrice Grimshaw, which had been previously filmed by Australasian Films as The Adorable Outcast (1928)
- a remake of The Pioneers (1926) which had been made by Australasian
- a remake of Tall Timber (1926)
- a remake of The Fatal Wedding (1911)
- Rudd's New Selection, a sequel to On Our Selection
- Big Timber from a script by Edmond Seward from the novel by William Hatfield – It is likely this project was bumped for Tall Timbers (1937)
- Gold Dust and Ashes from a story by Ion Idriess
- film written by Kenneth Wilkinson about koalas to be directed by Frank Hurley along the lines of Man of Aran (1934) – this was to be one of a series of naturalistic films from Hurley written by Wilkinson – this plan was abandoned by April 1936
- film shot by Frank Hurley about an expedition to the South Pole partially shot in Antarctica
- Pearl of Great Price, a story about the pearling trade – this may have become Lovers and Luggers
- Yellow Sands – a "thrilling tale of Australian sport and manhood"
- The Haunted House
- the story of the Overland Telegraph
- an adaptation of the novel Robbery Under Arms
- a version of the Eureka Stockade story.
- Life of Melba, a biopic about opera singer Nellie Melba starring Marjorie Lawrence – announced September 1939, film meant to start in June 1940. John Boles was to co-star. However the war caused these plans to be pushed back.
- adaptation of Tusitala to be made in the 1960s

Hall intended to cast overseas stars in the lead of Overland Telegraph, Robbery Under Arms and Erueka Stockade.

=== Robbery Under Arms ===
Of all these an adaptation of Robbery Under Arms was the most frequently discussed – Ken G. Hall later described it as "the film I wanted to make more than any other".

Film rights were bought from Raymond Longford (for a reported £1,500) and a script prepared. The film was meant to be Cinesound's third feature and was announced on 20 March 1933. There were plans to shoot it in colour.

It was pushed back to be Cinesound's fourth feature and John Longden signed to play Captain Starlight. A budget of £20,000 was allocated with filming to take place in Burraganong Valley. Edmund Barclay wrote the script.

The movie was then pushed back to enable filming of Cinesound Varieties. Shooting was meant to start after that but it was winter and experience of Squatter's Daughter showed this cost time so the film was postponed again. Another reason is that Cinesound had trouble with the censor on The Silence of Dean Maitland and were worried about censor trouble on Robbery; Hall said he would not make the film until the censor had passed the script.

It was then announced the film would be made the next year following Grandad Rudd at a budget of £15,000. However this was abandoned because Cinesound were unsure whether the ban against bushranging films still applied.

In 1935 it was announced the film would be one of four movies made by Cinesound in response to the New South Wales Film Quota Act (the others were Thoroughbred, Tall Timbers and Lovers and Luggers). The film was announced again in late 1936 and late 1937. In 1938 Hal Roach announced plans to make a bushranger story called Captain Midnight in Hollywood; Hall reminded that he had the rights to Robbery Under Arms. (Roach made an original story called Captain Fury).

William Freshman and his wife were bought out to Australia in 1939 to work on projects for Cinesound, including Robbery Under Arms, although Hall was still to direct it.

These plans were postponed by the advent of World War II and Cinesound's withdrawal from feature film production in 1940.

After the war Hall tried to produce the film independently but was unable to secure the necessary funds. As late as 1952, Cinesound almost raised money for a coproduction with Ealing Studios, who were going to make Robbery Under Arms following Eureka Stockade. They were ultimately prevented by restrictions on capital investment and the closing of Pagewood Studios.
