= Hamilton Webber =

Australian composer

Hamilton Webber was an Australian composer best known for his long association with Cinesound Productions.

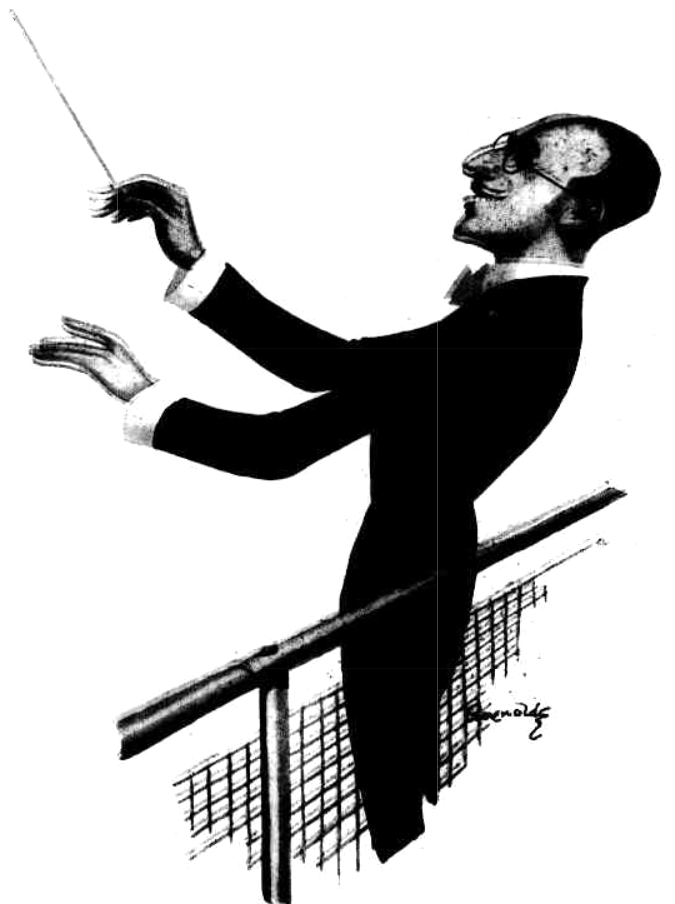
1929 caricature by Reynolds

He also worked extensively in the theatre. The songs he wrote for the Fuller brothers' pantomime Mother Goose were praised by Harry Jacobs, among others.
