= Letty Craydon =

Letty Craydon (1899 – 2 November 1965) was an Australian actress who performed on stage, radio, television and in films. She was also an author. Craydon made her professional debut aged six months old. She said she specialised in the "mop and bucket act".

She was married to Ron Shand. Craydon died in 1965 after a short illness.

Craydon Place in the Canberra suburb of Chapman is named in her honour.

== Select credits ==
- Tall Timbers (1937) – film
- The Broken Melody (1938) – film
- Let George Do It (1938) – film
- Mr. Chedworth Steps Out (1939) – film
- Seven Little Australians (1939) – film
- Gone to the Dogs (1939) – film
- Dad Rudd MP (1940) – film
- Reunion in Vienna (1941) – play
- Kangaroo (1952) – film
- The Deep Blue Sea (1955) – play
- Smiley (1956) – film
- Grab Me a Gondola (1959) – play
- Farewell, Farewell, Eugene (1960) – TV play
- Summer of the Seventeenth Doll (1960) – play
- Consider Your Verdict (1962) – TV series (various episodes)
- The Birthday Party (1965) – play
