= Calcutta in the Morning =

1948 radio play by Geoffrey Thomas

- Genre: drama play
- Running time: 60 mins (8:00 pm – 9:00 pm)
- Country of origin: Australia
- Language: English
- Syndicates: ABC
- Written by: Geoffrey Thomas
- Directed by: Frank Harvey
- Recording studio: Sydney
- Original release: December 1948

Calcutta in the Morning is a 1948 Australian radio play by Geoffrey Thomas based on his 1947 stage play of the same name.

Thomas was an English writer who emigrated to Australia. It was one of the most highly regarded Australian radio plays of the 1940s and is probably Thomas' best known play in Australia.

The stage play debuted in London in June 1947. The Guardian called it "a play of too many ideas." The Observer said "much of the piece is ingenious crystal-gazing, wittily designed."

The radio play was broadcast in 1948 and repeated in early 1949. According to one listener, "the choice of the play itself implies a courageous policy on the part of the A.B.C. It is somewhat rare to find entertainment allied to such a vigorous analysis of our time.... Radio, with its unlimited audience, stands in need of the truthful and sensitive message that Calcutta in the Morning portrayed so convincingly. It is not perhaps too much to hope that more plays of this type over the air will give a lead to the theatre as such in this country." . The play was popular and was adapted for radio again in December 1952.

== Premise ==
According to ABC Weekly:

Like all the best fantasies, Calcutta in the Morning has realistic truth at its core. It tells of George Grainger a wealthy manufacturer not much in sympathy with the eternal money - grubbing round. By instinct and choice he is a scientist. With his wife, his brother-in-law Charles (a pompous major-general), his daughter Isobel and his secretary, a very eligible young woman, he is flying to Calcutta on a business mission. The plane mysteriously crashes and the party discover themselves out of the world of time and space.
