= Lorna Westbrook =

Australian actress

Lorna Westbrook (17 March 1912 – 8 November 1974) was an Australian actress who worked in the 1930s and 1940s.

She was a socialite discovered by Ken G. Hall who cast her in Dad Rudd MP. She had a role in 100,000 Cobbers the wartime short.

== Select credits ==
- Dad Rudd MP (1940)
- 100,000 Cobbers (1943)
