= Don Nicol =

Australian stage comedian (1906–1949)

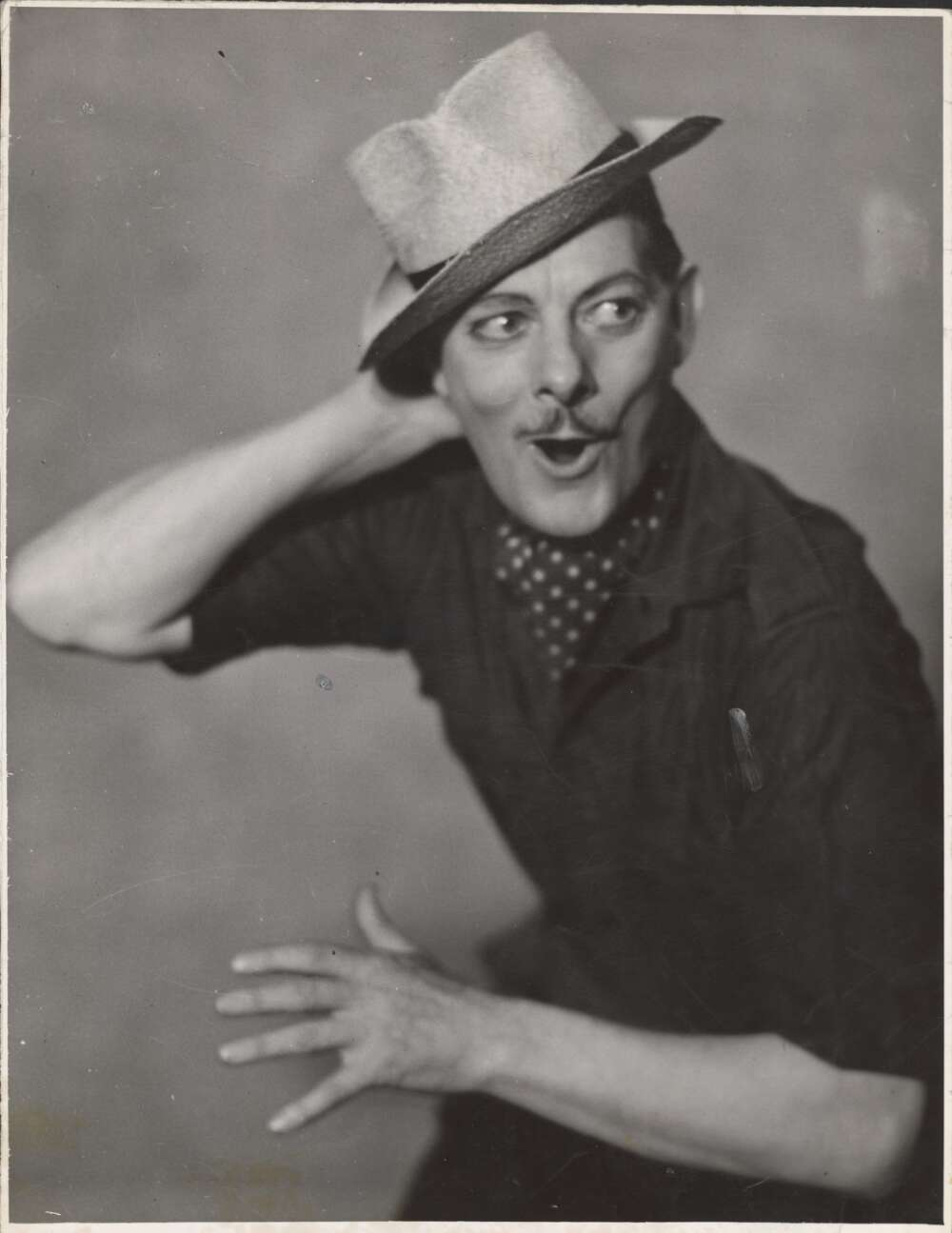
- Nicol, c. 1930s
- Born: Daniel Robert McNicol; 10 October 1906; Melbourne, Victoria, Australia
- Died: 18 February 1949 (aged 42); Melbourne, Victoria, Australia
- Resting place: Fawkner Memorial Park
- Other name: Danny McNicol
- Occupations: Actor, comedian
- Years active: c. 1925–1949
- Employer: J. C. Williamson's

Don Nicol (10 October 1906 – 18 February 1949), born Daniel Robert McNicol and also known as Danny McNicol, was an Australian stage actor and comedian. He became a principal comedian for the theatrical firm J. C. Williamson's, appearing in musical comedies, operettas and pantomimes across Australia and New Zealand from the mid-1920s until the late 1940s.

== Early life ==
Nicol was born Daniel Robert McNicol in Melbourne on 10 October 1906. According to a 1929 profile, he inherited his love of the stage from his father, who nonetheless warned him to "avoid greasepaint like the devil", and he began his working life as a cartoonist. Early in his career he toured with a theatrical company that became stranded in North Queensland. He is said to have funded his return to Sydney by sketching hotel patrons for two shillings apiece. He also performed character roles with Pat Hanna's Diggers company at the Garden Theatre.

Nicol married Oda Larsen when they were both aged 18.

== Career ==
Nicol performed for J. C. Williamson's from the mid-1920s, his earliest recorded appearance being in Cappy Ricks in 1925. Over the following two decades he appeared in a long run of musical comedies, operettas and pantomimes, including The Desert Song, in which he played the comic "society writer" The Maid of the Mountains, Rose Marie, The Merry Widow, The New Moon and Balalaika. A 1938 profile in Sydney's Labor Daily described him as "developing into one of the best comedians the Australian stage has known".

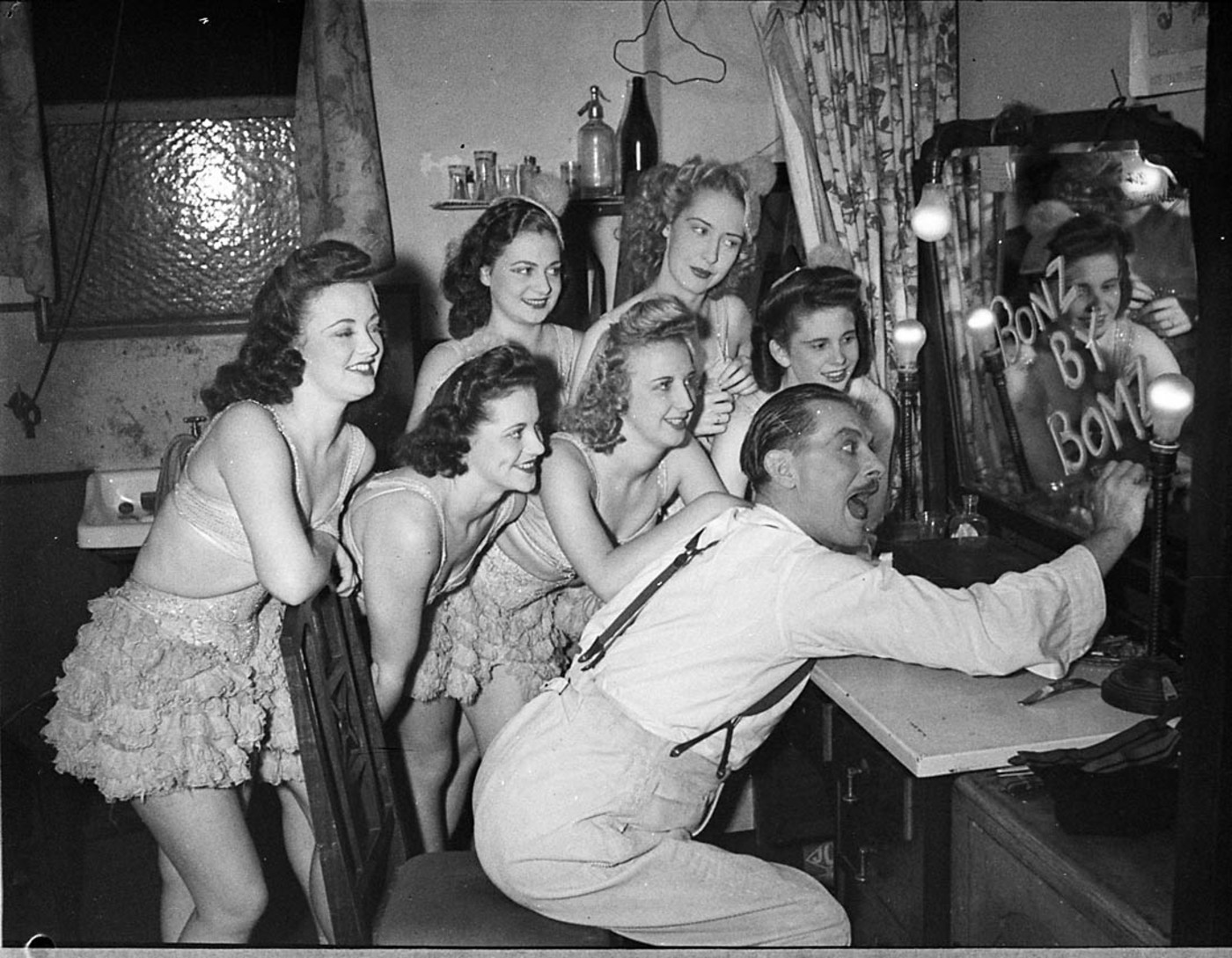
Don Nicol and the Ballet at Theatre Royal 1946.

After the death of the comedian Gus Bluett, Nicol "came into his own as a musical comedy lead" and became a principal comedian in J. C. Williamson productions. He appeared in pantomime, including Sinbad the Sailor, Aladdin and the Wonderful Lamp and Sleeping Beauty, toured New Zealand with the Celebrity Comedy Company, and worked in radio, appearing in the Lux Radio Theatre in 1940. He worked closely with Gladys Moncrieff and Edward Joseph Tait.

Among his later roles were "Hardboiled Herman" in Rose Marie (his final Brisbane appearance) in 1946, and the Australian production of Follow the Girls alongside Lois Green, which proved to be his last stage role, at the Theatre Royal, Sydney.

== Actors' Equity and 1944 injunction ==
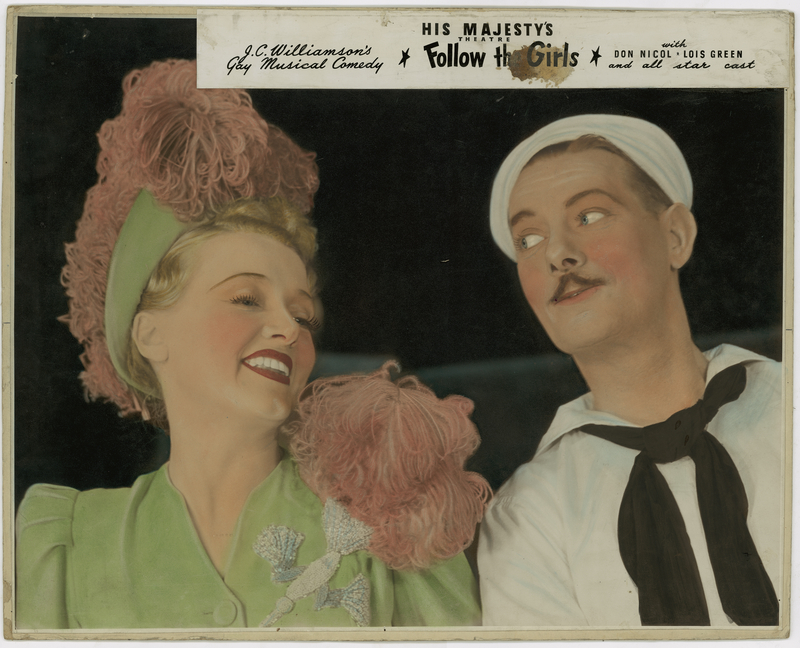
Don Nicol and Lois Green in the Australian production of Follow The Girls

Nicol was vice-president of the Australian actors union, Actors' Equity. In 1944, during an industrial dispute between the union and J. C. Williamson Ltd, the J.C. Williamson company obtained an interlocutory injunction, restraining Nicol from appearing in any public or private engagement without its consent. His counsel told the court that Nicol had received nothing for his recent performances, the proceeds of which had gone to funds used in opposing the company.

== Death ==
Nicol died on 18 February 1949 at the Gresswell Sanatorium in Melbourne, after an illness that newspapers attributed to a throat complaint. He was buried at Fawkner Cemetery, where Pipe-Major Hugh Fraser, an old friend, played the laments Land of the Leal and The Road to the Isles, and the service was conducted by the Rev. H. F. Elmore of the Port Melbourne Presbyterian Church.
