= Gone to the Dogs (1939 film) =

- Theatrical release poster
- Directed by: Ken G. Hall
- Written by: George Wallace; Frank Harvey; Frank Coffey
- Produced by: Ken G. Hall
- Starring: George Wallace; Lois Green; John Dobbie
- Cinematography: George Heath
- Edited by: William Shepherd
- Production company: Cinesound Productions
- Distributed by: British Empire Films (Aust); Renown Pictures (UK)
- Release date: 18 August 1939
- Running time: 83 mins (Aust); 63 mins (UK)
- Country: Australia
- Language: English
- Budget: £20,000

Gone to the Dogs is a 1939 musical comedy vehicle starring George Wallace. It was the second of two films he made for director Ken G. Hall, the first being Let George Do It (1938).

== Synopsis ==
George is a disaster-prone zoo attendant who accidentally discovers a substance that accelerates motion, enabling his greyhound to run faster. This attracts the interest of a gang of criminals, led by Doctor Sundermann (a foreigner), who have their base in a "haunted house" next to the zoo. The criminals kidnap George's dog and plan to substitute their own in an important dog race. George and his friends defeat the crooks and their dog wins the race.

George's housekeeper, Mrs McAllister, has a daughter, Jean, who romances vet Jimmy Alderson - but who is also loved by Ted Inchape. Ted kisses Jean after the song 'Gone to the Dogs', causing Jimmy to punch out Ted and Jean to call Jimmy a "beast".

== Cast ==
- George Wallace as George
- Lois Green as Jean McAllister
- John Dobbie as Henry Applegate
- John Fleeting as Jimmy Alderson
- Ronald Whelan as Willard
- Alec Kellaway as Mad Jack
- Letty Craydon as Mrs McAllister
- Kathleen Esler as Irene Inchape
- Howard Craven as Ted Inchape
- Harold Meade as Mr Inchape
- Lou Vernon as Doctor Sundermann
- George Lloyd as Quinn
- Harry Abdy as Hogg
- Reginald Collins as Benson
- Jack Settle as head keeper
- Stephen Doo as Sing Lo, who sings a song that Wallace dances to
- Hughie as Aloysius, the dog

== Production ==
George Wallace signed with Cinesound in February 1937. Stuart F. Doyle announced that Gone to the Dogs would be his first movie for the company but he ended up making Let George Do It first.

As with all Cinesound comedies in the late 30s, uncredited work on the script was performed by Hall, Jim Bancks and Bill Maloney. Frank Coffey was Cinesound's in house story editor. The story followed a formula developed in Wallace's Ticket in Tatts: "George is given a simple labourer's job... Quite innocently is fired... He then becomes involved in a simple wish-fulfilment device... the device is complicated by an equally simple set of stereotyped gangsters who have no motivation beyond innate greed for greater wealth, and in each situation they are foiled, usually accidentally, by George and his friends." Filmink arguefd "effort had been put in to make sure the story makes sense and proceeds logically (more or less): far more so than Wallace’s movies for Thring, anyway. The script was co-written by Hall’s regular scribe, Frank Harvey, who understood structure – and there’s some epigrammatic dialogue in the non-Wallace scenes... that feels particularly Frank Harvey-ish."

Filming started in January 1939 and was completed by May.

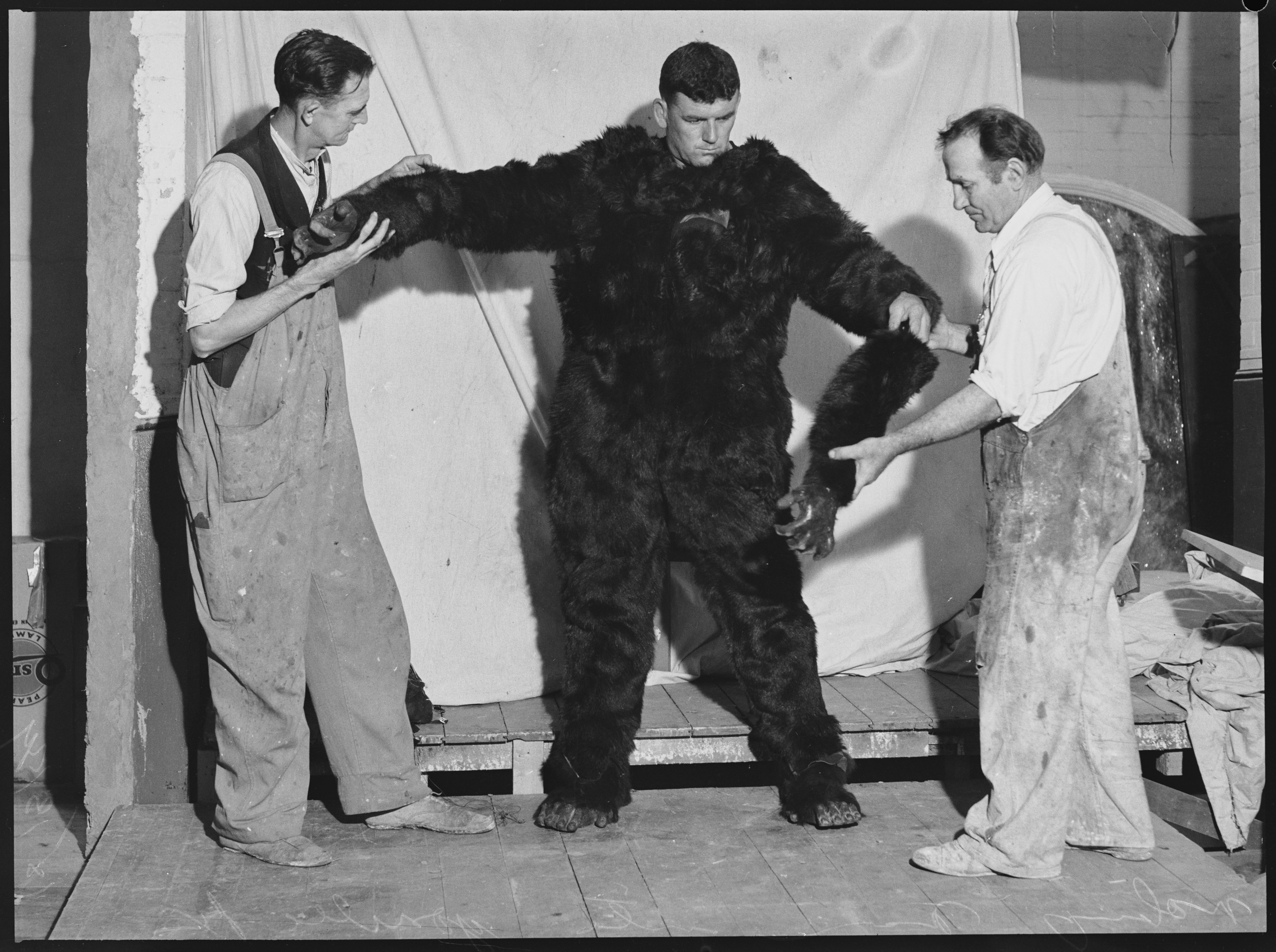
Fred Atkins being fitted out in his gorilla costume, Cinesound Studios, Sydney, 21 February 1939

Wallace's female co-star was Lois Green, an actor with extensive stage experience with J. C. Williamson Ltd, who left Australia after filming to go work in London. The romantic male lead was an unknown amateur actor called John Fleeting, who later appeared for Hall in Come Up Smiling (1939).

The supporting cast also included John Dobbie, Wallace's long-time stooge on stage, and Howard Craven, a former publicity writer for MGM in Sydney who had gone into acting. Versatile character actor Lou Vernon was cast as the foreign-accented villain. Hughie the dog, who played George's "greyhound", was selected over 100 other applicants. Extras were drawn from Cinesound's Talent School.

A set built for the film was promoted at the time as being the largest ever built for an Australian movie at over 12,000 square feet. Some location shooting took place at Taronga Zoo.

While on location in Campbelltown, a scene was filmed where George Wallace was run over. A farmer saw this and called the police.

A highlight of the film involved a "greyhound ballet," during the full-cast production number of the title song. This involved training greyhounds for two weeks so they would be used to the lights and easily led around while working with ballet dancers. The opening sequence involves Wallace having an encounter with gorillas. Cinesound's special effects man J Kenyon recalled an incident with creating the costumes:

The costumes were made first of all by the furrier, but they fitted so perfectly the actors could hardly move in them, so I got to work. I had to unpick all the stitches and then redesign the costumes, allowing for more accommodation. Even then, none could cope with being enclosed in such a 'hot house,' and in the end we had to get a professional wrestler to play the part of both animals. He lost three stone while the scenes were being taken.

The wrestler was Fred Atkins. Grant Taylor auditioned for the part of the gorilla. He was unsuccessful but this led to him being cast in Dad Rudd, MP (1940).

The theme song was composed by a Viennese composer living in Sydney, Henry Krips.

== Songs ==
- "We'll Build a Little Home" - lyrics and music by George Wallace (arranged by Henry Kripps)
- "Gone to the Dogs" - lyrics by Harry Allen, music by Henry Kripps

== Release ==
Gone to the Dogs had its world premiere at the Majestic Theatre, Launceston in 1939. Hall later wrote that the two films he made with Wallace "were very substantial hits". Reviews were generally positive.

The film was released in England in a shortened version. Hall said, "They cut them down regardless to make a specific time, to make it into a second feature. They said that they wouldn’t buy the picture unless they got the negative. So the Company gave them the negative and they cut the bloody thing. What we got back was 55 minutes out of a 75 minute film. They cut out a lot of good comedy, to suit their own ends; to get it to second feature length and to pinch the title."

Filmink called it "absolutely and endearingly shameless in its pursuit of entertaining its target audience... Hall directs with enthusiasm and skill, and it is funny to see George Wallace fight gangsters, gorillas, scary skeletons and the laws of physics." The magazine added "the real surprise packet of this film is Lois Green... she’s pretty, can act, sing and dance, and is full of charm; she’s wonderful."
