= 100,000 Cobbers =

1942 film

- Directed by: Ken G. Hall
- Written by: Ken G. Hall; Frank Coffey; John Lennon
- Produced by: Ken G. Hall
- Starring: Grant Taylor; Shirley Ann Richards
- Cinematography: Bert Nicholas
- Edited by: William Shepherd
- Production companies: Cinesound Productions; Department of Information
- Distributed by: British Empire Films (Australia)
- Release date: 6 March 1942
- Running time: 37 minutes
- Country: Australia
- Language: English
- Budget: £1,976

100,000 Cobbers is a 1942 dramatised documentary made by director Ken G. Hall for the Australian Department of Information during World War II to boost recruitment into the armed forces. Grant Taylor, Joe Valli and Shirley Ann Richards play fictitious characters.

== Plot ==
Five men enlist in the AIF – laid back Bill; World War I veteran Scotty, who pretends to be 37 years old; an "old school tie" businessman Peter, who is running his dead father's business, and whose secretary Miss Lane leaves for overseas service as a VAD; the rebellious "Bluey" William Baker; and Jim, who leaves behind his new wife, Jean.

Bluey and Bill almost get in a fight when Bluey tries to cut into the line during enlistment but the five soon become friends. The five soldiers go through basic training and become good soldiers. Bill falls for a female chiropodist working at the camp.

Bluey, Bill, Jim and Peter get leave and spend a day at Luna Park in Sydney with their women (Bluey has a girl called "Blondie"), then go to a cabaret. They all toast to the future.

The men then go to a pub before embarking for overseas. Scotty tells his four mates that he has been kicked out the army for being too old at 48 years old.

The other four go on board while Scotty works in a munitions factory. The final scene is of the four cobbers going into action, Jim, Peter and Bill thinking of their women.

The movie ends with a quote from Henry Lawson, "I tell you the star of the south shall rise... in the lurid clouds of war".

== Cast ==
Some of the cast were billed with their military rank:

- Sgt John Fleeting, AIF as Peter Montgomery
- Joe Valli, ex-AIF as Scotty
- Sig. Barry Ross, AIF as William "Bluey" Baker
- Pvte Grant Taylor, AMF as Bill
- Gilbert Ellis as Jim
- Aileen Britten as Miss Lane
- Shirley Ann Richards
- Lorna Westbrook as Blondie
- Patricia Firman as Jean
- Moya Beaver

== Production ==
Cinesound Productions were commissioned to make the film by the Department of Information and its Minister Harry Foll. The original title was Democratic Army. Director Ken G. Hall said he wanted to make a featurette as opposed to a documentary film. The theme of it was to "show that a man may not have a friend in the world, but from the moment he joins the Army he has "cobbers" in plenty."

Filming began on 15 September 1941 and took 14 days.

Various members of the cast were granted leave from the army to appear in the film, including Grant Taylor, John Fleeting and Barry Ross.

Fleeting, Taylor, Joe Vallie, Lorna Westbrook, Aileen Britton and Shirley Ann Richards had all appeared in films for Ken G. Hall previously. A number of amateurs were also used in the cast. Barry Ross was an experienced stage actor.

100,000 Cobbers was mostly filmed at Liverpool Military camp using national servicemen. There was also location shooting at Luna Park.

Shirley Ann Richards plays a chiropractor. It was her last role in Australia before leaving for Hollywood.

Ken Hall later recalled in his memoirs:

It [the film] provided a much bigger snag to make than we had expected: there were next to no troops available to make it with. The army had a few hundred militiamen in camp at Liverpool. They had been called up for national service and home defence, were raw and as yet untrained. Eighteen-year-olds formed a big percentage, and they were out to prove their manhood by stacking their own normal conversation with every four-letter word in the language. As soldiers they had a long way to go, but they were all we had. The veteran NCOs got stuck into them and soon had them in at least rough shape. There was an AIF officers' training school also in the area, with keen young men aspiring to leadership. We were mighty glad to have them, and they provided the front (close-to-camera) people we needed. I'm sure those militiamen were turned into good soldiers eventually and indeed some of them could have been among those originals at Kokoda.

Roden Cutler was a liaison officer at Liverpool.

== Release ==
While the film was originally made to increase recruitment for the AIF, after Japan entered the war additional footage was shot and the film recut to also appeal to the Australian Militia Force.

The film was previewed to the Department of Information on 29 January 1942. It was released throughout Australia as a supporting featurette in Greater Union cinemas.

=== Critical ===
The Sydney Morning Herald called 100,000 Cobbers "a fine film call to the fighting youth of Australia in this grave hour... the best film Ken Hall as made and it will have particularly nostalgic appeal for old diggers... It is often a quietly moving story."

Smith's Weekly declared it was "probably the best medium-length picture made in Australia... Originally intended as a recruiting appeal, it goes further — becomes entertainment and thus knocks recruiting nail home in a way Australian pictures have mostly failed to do so far... Flaw in the picture — only a minor one at that — is perhaps the length of closing scenes. Otherwise, quite a little classic, and we could do with more like it at once."

The News of Adelaide called it "probably the best documentary film Australia has produced... well acted, neatly produced and its action scenes are authentic and moving."

The Mercury of Hobart wrote that Joe Valli was "outstanding".

The West Australian wrote that:

It is a film for everybody, a picture everyone should see and one that no Australian can view without a feeling of pride and genuine emotion... From the time the recruits reach the enlistment depot every phase of their lives and training is presented with a realism hitherto lacking in some of our propaganda films.

The film was distributed in England and the US.

Filmnk magazine later wrote that Taylor and Richards made a "marvellous team" and called the film "terrific. Cinesound totally should have turned it into a feature. We know the reason why that wasn’t done – they were only commissioned to make a 30 minute film – but it wouldn’t have taken too much effort to expand. Cobbers has enough characters and conflict to sustain a feature film along the lines of The Way Ahead (1944).

== Later release ==
In 1947 the army was worried about running short of men to serve in Japan and the islands. They used the film as a recruiting tool in conjunction with the British documentary The True Glory.
