= After the Ball (musical) =

- Mrs Erlynne and the company
- Music: Noël Coward
- Lyrics: Noël Coward
- Productions: 1954 London

After the Ball is a musical by Noël Coward based on the 1892 play by Oscar Wilde, Lady Windermere's Fan.

After a provincial tour, the musical premiered at the Globe Theatre, London, on 10 June 1954 and ran for 188 performances until 20 November 1954. Robert Helpmann was the director, and the cast included Mary Ellis, Vanessa Lee, Peter Graves, Lois Green and Irene Browne.

After the Ball was the last Coward musical launched in the West End; his last two musicals debuted on Broadway before opening in London. After the Ball enjoyed a 1999 Coward centenary production at the Peacock Theatre, London.

== Background ==
Coward decided, in August 1953, to base a musical on Oscar Wilde's play, Lady Windermere's Fan; he worked on it until January 1954. He delegated the first draft of the script to his secretary, Cole Lesley. Lesley "cut out the more glaringly melodramatic of Wilde's lines and divided the remainder into sections ending with a suitable 'cue for a song'" "I know that it is very good indeed," wrote Coward of the finished piece, "I have... turned out some of the best lyrics I have ever written" Coward worked on the piece during his customary winter holiday in Jamaica in December 1953. His music director, Norman Hackforth, flew to Jamaica to help him finish the score after Christmas. The scenery and costume design was by Doris Zinkeisen.

Coward cast Mary Ellis in the leading role of Mrs Erlynne, unwisely accepting without audition her assurance that, in her late 50s, she was singing as well as ever. Hackforth soon realised that she could not adequately sing Coward's difficult music for the role. In Coward's absence, Hackforth reluctantly cut the most challenging music for the twelve-week tour opening in Liverpool on 1 March 1954, but he was still dismayed by Ellis's delivery of the music. Coward returned to England at the end of March and saw the production at Bristol on 1 April. He was distressed by what he saw and heard: "the absence of style in the direction... a great deal of the performance was inaudible.... Vanessa [Lee] sang divinely but acted poorly. Mary Ellis acted well but sang so badly I could hardly bear it. The orchestra was appalling, the orchestrations beneath contempt, and poor Norman [Hackforth] conducted like a stick of wet asparagus.".

Coward immediately began major rewriting, reorganisation, reorchestration and cutting of the show. He fired his old friend Hackforth as musical director. Hackforth remembered, "If [Coward] had struck me across the face and told me I was no bloody good it would have been less painful!" Coward engaged Phil Green to reorchestrate the score and revised much of Robert Helpmann's production, but he was still "terribly disappointed about After the Ball. The whole project has been sabotaged by Mary not being able to sing it. Unfortunately she is a strong personality and plays it well, otherwise I would of course have had her out of the cast weeks ago." He was still more forthright to his friends Alfred Lunt and Lynn Fontanne: "I have been having a terrible time with After the Ball, mainly on account of Mary Ellis's singing voice which, to coin a phrase, sounds like someone fucking the cat. I know that your sense of the urbane, sophisticated Coward wit will appreciate this simile." In London, reviews were mixed: "The daily Press was idiotic as usual but well-disposed and good box-office. [The Sunday papers] are, on the whole, very good, particularly Harold Hobson in the Sunday Times." The show ran from 10 June until 20 November 1954.

In retrospect, the director, Helpmann, wondered whether the attempt to combine Wilde and Coward was ever likely to have worked:

You would have thought that a play of Wilde's with music by Noël Coward should be marvellous, but I suddenly realised at the first rehearsal it was like having two funny people at a dinner party. Everything that Noel sent up, Wilde was sentimental about, and everything that Wilde sent up Noel was sentimental about. It was two different points of view and it didn't work."

== Synopsis ==
In 1899 London, the upper crust gather at Lord and Lady Windermere's London house for a spectacular ball. Lady Windermere at first ignores the gossip that she has a rival for her husband's affections, an older woman called Mrs Erlynne, but she eventually confronts Lord Windermere with the accusation. He admits that he has been paying money to Mrs Erlynne but denies that he has had an affair with her and refuses to say more. In fact, Mrs Erlynne is Lady Windermere's mother, whom her daughter believes to be dead, and Lord Windermere is paying her money to keep her from revealing the relationship.

Lady Windermere, still believing the worst of her husband, is tempted by the amorous advances of the debonair Lord Darlington and agrees to visit him at his flat. Mrs Erlynne, learning of this before Lord Windermere, rushes to Darlington's flat to prevent her daughter from committing a destructive folly similar to that which she herself committed twenty years earlier. Without letting Lady Windermere know that they are mother and daughter, Mrs Erlynne persuades her that a liaison with Lord Darlington would be disastrous, but before they can leave, Lord Windermere arrives. The ladies conceal themselves, but Lord Windermere discovers the fan that he has recently given his wife as a birthday present and demands to know if Lord Darlington has Lady Windermere in his rooms. To prevent the exposure of Lady Windermere, Mrs Erlynne enters, saying that it is she who is under Lord Darlington's roof and must have picked up Lady Windermere's fan by mistake. Lady Windermere's reputation is saved, but Mrs Erlynne's is compromised. Fortunately, her admirer, Lord Augustus Lorton, is convinced of her honour and proposes marriage. The Windermeres are reconciled, and all ends happily. Lady Windermere never learns that Mrs Erlynne is her mother.

== Musical numbers ==
- "Oh, What a Century It's Been"
- "I Knew That You Would Be My Love"
- "Mr. Hopper's Chanty"
- "Sweet Day"
- "Quartette"
- "Crème de la Crème"
- "Light Is the Heart"
- "Why Is It the Woman Who Pays?"
- "London at Night"
- "Aria"
- "May I Have the Pleasure?"
- "All My Life Ago"
- "Faraway Land"
- "Something on a Tray"
- "Clear Bright Morning"

In his book My Life with Noël Coward, Graham Payn reproduced the lyrics for two major numbers featuring Mrs Erlynne which had to be cut because Mary Ellis could not manage them: Mrs Erlynne's entrance in Act I and an aria in the first act finale.

== Productions ==
After the original run, there has been only one professional revival in the West End, a 1999 Coward centenary production at the Peacock Theatre, London, conducted by John McGlinn. Casts of the original production and the revival are given below.

Role	1954 cast	1999 centenary cast
Duchess of Berwick	Irene Browne	Penelope Keith
Lady Plymdale	Lois Green	Rosie Ashe
Lady Stutfield	Pam Marmont	Fiona Kimm
Lady Jedburgh	Betty Felstead	Frances McCafferty
Mr Dumby	Dennis Bowen	Christopher Saunders
Cecil Graham	Tom Gill	Tom McVeigh
Mrs Hurst-Green	Marion Grimaldi	
Lord Augustus Lorton	Donald Scott	Gordon Sandison
Lord Windermere	Peter Graves	Eric Roberts
Lady Windermere	Vanessa Lee	Linda Kitchen
Mr Hopper	Graham Payn	George Dvorsky
Lord Darlington	Shamus Locke	Karl Daymond
Lady Agatha Carlisle	Patricia Cree	Nina Young
Mrs Erlynne	Mary Ellis	Marie McLaughlin
