= Hal Carleton =

Australian screenwriter and novelist

Harold "Hal" H. Carleton (c.1896 – 25 December 1949) was an Australian writer. He was a friend of film director Ken G. Hall and was part of Hall's comedy writing team at Cinesound Productions in the late 1930s. He also wrote novels.

Carleton joined the publicity department of Union Theatres in 1917, working his way up to director of publicity in 1925. The following year he became general manager of the Prince Edward Theatre until 1929, after which he was part owner of the Rox Theatre in Parramatta. He join MGM in 1935 as advertising director. Hall declared "there was no better publicity man in Australia."

Carleton's wife had died in 1948 and he was survived by his son.

== Select credits ==
- The Spirit of Gallipoli (1928) – screenplay
- Let George Do It (1938) – original story
- Dad and Dave Come to Town (1938) – uncredited contribution to screenplay
- Murder Every 28 Days! – novella
- They're Coming to Get Me – novella
