= The Last Enemy (play) =

- Original language: English
- Written by: Frank Harvey
- Setting: In the Antarctic at the Perry's and at Warrender's Lodging

Premiere
- Date: 19 December 1929
- Place: Fortune Theatre, London

The Last Enemy is a 1929 play by actor-writer Frank Harvey. It was initially produced by Tom Walls and ran for 12 weeks. Laurence Olivier was in the cast.

It opened on Broadway at the Schubert Theatre on 30 October 1930, with O.B. Clarence from the London cast. The production, directed by Nicholas Hannen, closed after four performances.

It had a run in Sydney in November 1930 and again in 1947.

== Plot ==
Two explorers die in the Antarctic but live on as spiritual guides to their children.

== Original London cast ==
- Clara Perry - Athene Seyler
- Cynthia Perry - Marjorie Mars
- Dr Alexander Mckenzie - Nicholas Hannen
- Harry Graham - Frank Lawton
- James Churchill - Carl Harbord
- Janitor - Edmund Tottenham
- Jerry Warrender - Laurence Olivier
- Nancy - Pamela Williams
- Thomas Perry - O.B. Clarence
- Wilson - Reginald Kenneth
