= John Fleeting =

Australian actor (1908–1984)

John Fleeting, real name Claude Stuart Fleeting (1908 – 24 March 1984), was an Australian actor best known for his film appearances for Ken G. Hall.

His father was a farmer and he grew up in Manildra. In 1936, Fleeting appeared in an amateur production of The Last of Mrs Cheyney alongside Shirley Ann Richards. Both were seen by a talent scout from Cinesound Productions. He was subsequently seen by Ken G. Hall in the play Men without Wives and Hall cast him as the romantic male lead in Gone to the Dogs.

Fleeting served in the Australian army during World War II from 1940 to 1946. He was given leave to appear in 100,000 Cobbers. According to his obituary, he became a builder.

== Select theatre credits ==
- I'll Leave It to You by Noël Coward – Savoy Theatre, Sydney(1935)
- The Last of Mrs. Cheyney – Savoy Theatre, Sydney 1936
- Men Without Wives – Sydney Players Club 1938
- tour of Charley's Aunt with Shirley Ann Richards

== Filmography ==
- Gone to the Dogs (1939)
- Ants in His Pants (1939)
- Forty Thousand Horsemen (1940)
- 100,000 Cobbers (1943) (short)
- Smithy (1946) - as Keith Anderson
