= Arthur Greville Collins =

American film director (1896–1980)

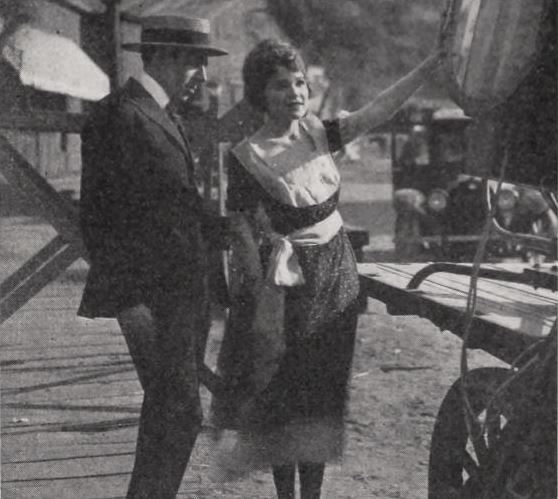
- Arthur Greville Collins and Betty Ross Clarke on the set of The Fox (1921)
- Born: September 5, 1896; London, England
- Died: September 1, 1980 (aged 84)
- Occupation: Director
- Spouse(s): Betty Ross Clarke (1921 - ?); Rhoda Shepherd (1934 - ?)

Arthur Greville Collins (September 5, 1896 – September 1, 1980) was a British-born film director.

== Career ==
Collins was born in London, and began directing for the stage, including productions of Fata Morgana, No Man's Land, and Tarnish.

In 1921, he married actress Betty Ross Clarke and accompanied her in her theatrical career in Great Britain, the United States, and Australia. In 1934 he wed Rhoda Shepherd.

He moved to Los Angeles and directed some plays there, then moved into movie making as a dialogue director for Warner Bros. He worked in that capacity for two years then became a director, making several B pictures.

He moved to Australia in May 1939 to make Seven Little Australians (1939) and decided to stay there. He served in the RAAF during World War II, being discharged as a squadron leader. He also was stationed as administrative officer for two years at Port Pirie and Mount Gambier.

In 1947 Collins managed to source funding to make another movie, Strong Is the Seed (1949). He later announced plans to make a film about Cobb and Co but this did not eventuate. In 1950, Collins travelled to New Zealand where he produced the musical comedy Chu Chin Chow for the Christchurch Operatic Society to favourable reviews.

== Partial filmography ==
- They Can't Be Snookered (1932 short) – producer
- The Widow from Monte Carlo (1935) – director
- Personal Maid's Secret (1935) – director
- Nobody's Fool (1936) – director
- Thank You, Jeeves! (1936) – director
- Paradise Isle (1937) – director
- Shots and Shots (1937 short) – co-director
- Saleslady (1938) – director
- Seven Little Australians (1939) – director
- Strong Is the Seed (1949) – director
- Port of Escape (1960) – producer, incomplete
