= Follow the Girls =

- Al Hirschfeld Promotional Caricature
- Music: Dan Shapiro; Milton Pascal; Phil Charig
- Lyrics: Dan Shapiro; Milton Pascal; Phil Charig
- Book: Guy Bolton and Fred Thompson
- Productions: 1944 Broadway; 1945 West End; 1946 Australia

Follow the Girls is a musical with a book by Guy Bolton, Eddie Davis and Fred Thompson and music and lyrics by Dan Shapiro, Milton Pascal, and Phil Charig.

A major wartime hit in both New York City and London, its thin plot about a burlesque striptease queen who becomes the star attraction at the Spotlight, a servicemen's club in Great Neck, Long Island, serves as an excuse for a series of songs, dance numbers, and comedy routines.

== Productions ==
The Broadway production, produced by Albert Borde, conceived and directed by Harry Delmar and choreographed by Catherine Littlefield, opened on April 8, 1944 at the New Century Theatre. It transferred to the 44th Street Theatre and then the Broadhurst to complete its 888-performance run. The cast included Jackie Gleason, Danny Aiello, Walter Long, and Gertrude Niesen.

The West End production, presented by Jack Hylton, opened on October 25, 1945 at His Majesty's Theatre, where it ran for 572 performances. The cast included Arthur Askey and Evelyn Dall.

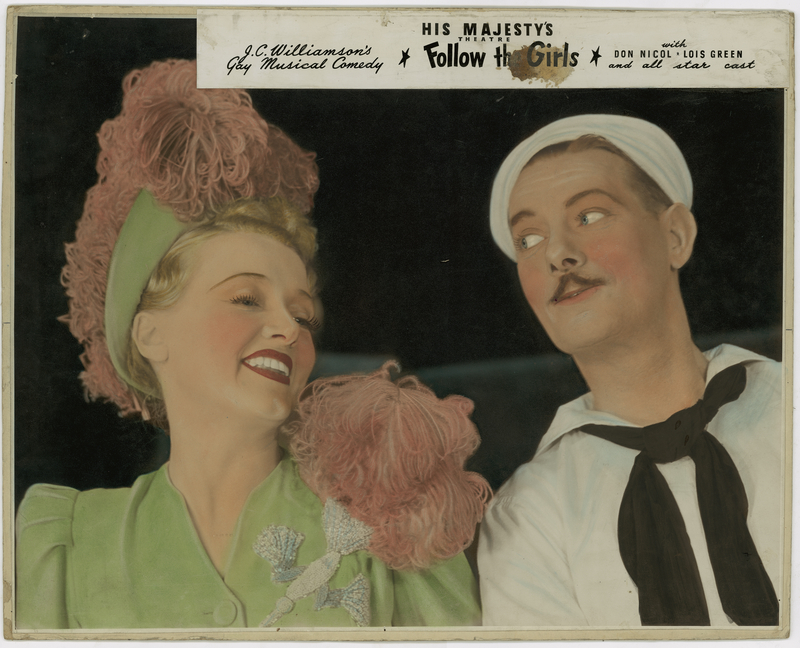
Lois Green and Don Nicol in Follow the Girls, His Majesty's Theatre Melbourne, 1947. Photograph by Hal Williamson

The Australian production was presented by J. C. Williamson's and starred Don Nicol and Lois Green. The show opened at the Theatre Royal, Sydney on October 12, 1946. The Melbourne season commenced April 10, 1947 at Her Majesty's Theatre, followed by a Perth season commencing May 22, 1948 at His Majesty’s Theatre.

== Song list ==
Act I

- At the Spotlight Canteen
- Where You Are
- You Don't Dance
- Strip Flips Hip
- Thanks for a Lousy Evening
- You're Perf
- Twelve O'Clock and All Is Well
- Out for No Good
- You Don't Dance (Reprise)
- Where You Are (Reprise)
- Follow the Girls

Act II

- John Paul Jones
- Where You Are (Reprise)
- I Wanna Get Married
- Today Will Be Yesterday Tomorrow
- You're Perf (Reprise)
- A Tree That Grows in Brooklyn
