= Phil Charig =

Philip 'Phil' Charig (August 31, 1902 – July 21, 1960) was an American composer, lyricist, songwriter, and pianist. He began his career in the early 1920s as a pianist and composer with the band leader Ben Bernie. He created stage works for both the New York and London stages; of which the best known is Follow the Girls (1944). He also composed music for American television and film. He was nominated for the Academy Award for Best Original Song at the 11th Academy Awards for the song "Merrily We Live" from the 1938 film of the same name.

== Life and career ==
Born on August 31, 1902, in New York City, Phil Charig began his career as a pianist and composer for the band leader Ben Bernie in the early 1920s. He then worked as rehearsal pianist for George Gershwin for his musicals Tell Me More (1925) and Tip-Toes (1925), and as the rehearsal pianist for Jerome Kern's Sunny (1925). He wrote the music for two songs published in the first edition of music magazine Americana; "Sunny Disposish" (1926, lyricist Ira Gershwin) and "Why Do Ya Roll Those Eyes?" (1926, lyricist Morrie Ryskind).

Charig's first musical as composer, Yes, Yes, Yvette, premiered in Boston in May 1927 and starred the actress Jeanette MacDonald. After another run of performances in Philadelphia, the production moved to Broadway's Sam H. Harris Theatre on October 3, 1927, and was received with a positive review in The New York Times. He wrote several more musicals over the next three decades, of which the most successful was Follow the Girls (1944).{

Charig wrote songs for the 1933 film That's a Good Girl, and composed the score to the 1938 film Swiss Miss. He was nominated for the Academy Award for Best Original Song at the 11th Academy Awards for the song "Merrily We Live" from the 1938 film of the same name. He also worked as a composer for American television; writing songs for Jackie Gleason and as a regular composer on The Milton Berle Show.

Phil Charig died at his home at 850 7th Avenue in New York City on July 21, 1960, after a year and half long illness.

== Musicals ==
- Yes, Yes, Yvette (1927); music also by Ben Jerome
- Just Fancy (1927); music also by Joseph Meyer
- That's a Good Girl (1928); music also by Joseph Meyer
- Polly (1929); music also by Herbert Stothart
- Sweet and Low (1930); music also by others
- Stand Up and Sing (1931)
- Nikki (1931)
- Artists and Models of 1943 (1943); music and lyrics by Phil Charig; music also by Dan Shapiro, Milton Pascal
- Follow the Girls (1944); music and lyrics by Phil Charig; music also by Dan Shapiro, Milton Pascal
- Catch a Star! (1955); music also by Sammy Fain
