= Doris Egerton Jones =

Australian playwright and novelist

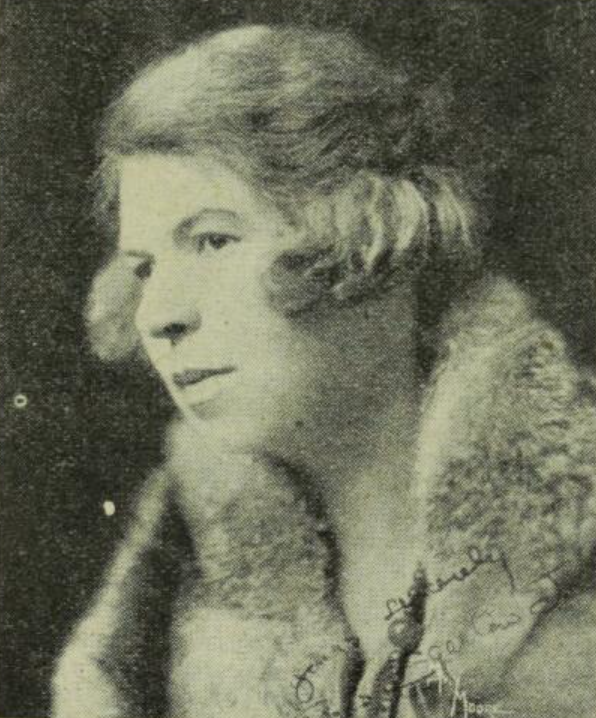
Doris Egerton Jones in 1930

Doris Egerton Jones (23 December 1889 – 30 September 1973), also known as Doris Callaghan and Doris Callahan, was an Australian writer of novels and plays.

== Early life ==
Egerton Jones was born in Mitcham, Adelaide, in 1889. She attended the Advanced School for Girls in Adelaide from 1901 to 1905. From 1909 to 1911 she studied at the University of Adelaide. She began to study law at a time when women could not practise law in South Australia. Although she did not complete her studies, she was instrumental in lobbying for a law change in 1911 allowing women to practise. She wrote her first play at age 14 and her first novel at 15.

== Career ==
In 1918 she travelled to London where she wrote the play Uncle Tibbett's Twins, which had Australian and cross-dressing themes. The Year Between, classed as romantic fiction, was her last novel and dealt with the mistreatment of Aboriginal people and the ANZAC landing in Gallipoli.

Her detective drama, The Flaw, written with the English actress Emélie Polini, was a melodrama. Her last play, Governor Bligh, a historical comedy about William Bligh, was produced by Allan Wilkie.

== Personal life ==
Egerton Jones married her husband Reginald Callaghan in 1918 in London; they later changed their name to Callahan. They returned to Sydney in 1922. They had one daughter and two sons.

She died on 30 September 1973 at Wahroonga, Sydney.

== Selected works ==
=== Novels and short stories ===
- Peter Piper (1913)
- Time O'Day (1915)
- Green Eyes (1915)
- Burnt Offerings (1916)
- The Coconut Planter (1916)
- The Year Between (1918)

=== Plays ===
- Uncle Tibbett's Twins (1918)
- The Flaw (1923). Co-authored with Emélie Polini.
- Governor Bligh (1930)
