= Harry Purvis =

Australian aviator (1909–1980)

George Henry Purvis
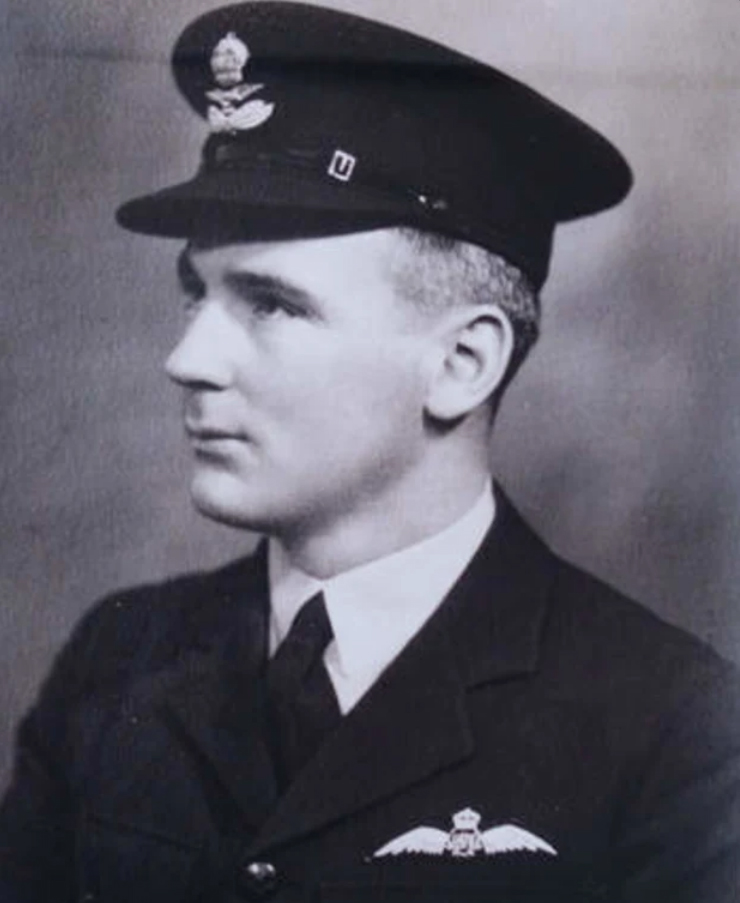
- Harry Purvis, RAAF
- Born: 6 May 1909; Cobar, New South Wales
- Died: 16 September 1980 (aged 71); Cairns, Queensland
- Military career
- Allegiance: Australia
- Branch: Royal Australian Air Force
- Service years: 1940–1946
- Rank: Wing Commander
- Nickname: Harry
- Units: No. 6 Squadron (1940); No. 1 OTU (1942)
- Commands: No. 36 Squadron (1942)
- Conflicts: Second World War; South West Pacific theatre
- Awards: Air Force Cross

George Henry "Harry" Purvis, AFC (6 May 1909 — 16 September 1980) was an Australian pioneer aviator, engineer, airline pilot, air-force pilot and author. He was the engineer responsible for maintenance of the famed Southern Cross aircraft. Purvis often flew as co-pilot with Sir Charles Kingsford Smith and was the last person to fly the Southern Cross. Purvis was co-pilot to P. G. Taylor on the first flight across the lower Pacific Ocean from Australia to South America, landing in Chile in 1951.

== Early life ==
Harry Purvis was born on 6 May 1909 at Cobar New South Wales, and spent his early days at Carrathool on the banks of the Murrumbidgee River, New South Wales. His father was an engineer at the Great Cobar Copper Mine. Purvis had his first flight in 1920 with a barnstormer, then trained as an engineer at Collingwood Technical College in Melbourne. Prior to completion of the course his father died, so Purvis returned to his home which by then was at Hillston, New South Wales, where his mother Rose Purvis managed the hotel. With the hope of pursuing a career in aviation, Purvis moved to the larger town of Griffith where by the age of twenty he ran his own motor vehicle and engineering business. In May 1931 an opportunity arose that set him on the career he yearned; Kingsford Smith and several other well known pilots flew into town on a barnstorming tour.

== Kingsford Smith ==
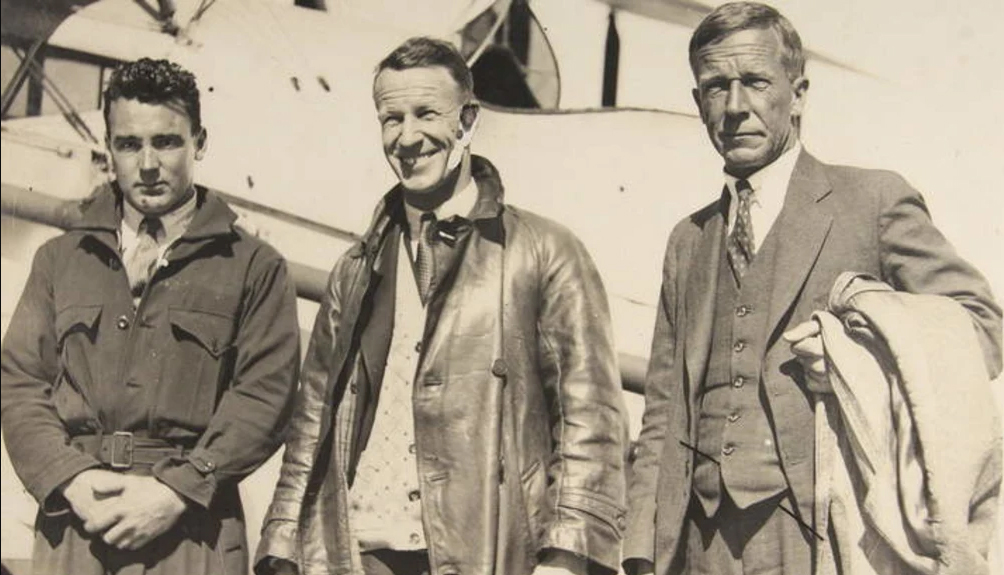
Harry Purvis (left) with Charles Kingsford Smith (middle) and Smithy's brother Wilfred

Kingsford Smith "Smithy" arrived at Griffith with his engineer Tommy Pethybridge. Purvis managed to meet them both and offered the use of his engineering services to the crew, thus beginning several years of cooperation between them. Pethybridge and Purvis had lengthy discussions about flying, which later led to Purvis's decision to sell his business and move to Sydney. With the funds from the sale, Purvis purchased an Avro Avian from Charles Ulm, who had been Smithy's co-pilot on their record breaking flight from the US to Australia. Purvis now had an aircraft, but did not have a licence. Kingsford Smith and Ulm had a small flying school at Mascot, so Purvis received his pilot training from G. U. "Scotty" Allan who much later became a senior figure in the international airline Qantas. In 1932 Smithy formed Kingsford Smith Air Service at Mascot, and offered Purvis a job barnstorming in Australia. By January 1933 Smithy had employed Purvis as co-pilot and chief mechanic on the Southern Cross.

== Aerial circus and airlines ==
In the years following the Great Depression Kingsford Smith Air Service fell on hard times so Purvis went out on his own, joining Cliff Carpenter's aerial circus consisting of eight aircraft that travelled to most towns on the eastern States. By then Purvis had sold his Avro Avian and bought a Fokker Universal (VH-UTO) six passenger aircraft. Having the dual qualifications of engineer and pilot helped to establish Purvis's reputation during this period, and his services were sought by several burgeoning companies. One of these was WASP Airlines (Western and Southern Provincial) in New South Wales, that was set up by Kingsford Smith's brother Wilfred. Purvis flew the inaugural tri-weekly service from Narromine to Sydney in March 1935. In December 1935 Purvis was flying between Brisbane and Sydney for the newly established New England Airways in a Monospar.

In late 1935 Purvis sold his Fokker Universal to Reg Ansett. This was Ansett's first aeroplane and on 17 February 1936, Ansett flew VH-UTO from Hamilton, Victoria to Melbourne on the inaugural flight of what was to become one of Australia's most successful airlines, Ansett Airlines. In 1936 Australian National Airways employed Purvis as captain flying Douglas DC-2 aircraft on regular domestic runs. In May 1939 Purvis was recruited by a Dutch owned airline KNILM (Royal Netherlands Indies' Airways) that was based in Batavia (Jakarta). The airline operated DC-2, DC-3 and Lockheed 14 aircraft from Batavia to Singapore, Borneo, Saigon, Celebes and Australia.

== World War II ==
At the outbreak of the World War II in September 1939, Purvis resigned his position with KNILM and returned to Australia to make himself available for Defence. In October 1939 Purvis was inducted into the Royal Australian Air Force (RAAF) as a Pilot Officer and was posted to No. 6 Squadron on 4 March 1940 to convert RAAF pilots to the Lockheed Hudson at Camden near Sydney. Following this he was posted to No. 13 Squadron, then to Central Flying School as an instructor. The next assignment was as a test pilot in the early stages of the development of the Beaufort aircraft. In January 1942 Purvis was posted to No. 1 Operational Training Unit, and shortly after was promoted to Squadron leader of a Beaufort training squadron. From February to July 1944 he was commanding officer (CO) of No. 36 Squadron RAAF. Purvis quickly rose through the ranks attaining Wing Commander status in July 1944 and was awarded the Air Force Cross for his outstanding organisational and leadership abilities contributing to success in the New Guinea campaign.

=== Surrender of Bali ===
After the Japanese had signed the surrender document ending World War II on 2 September 1945, Purvis and the transport wing were involved in repatriating Australian prisoners of war. He was in command of a RAAF Dakota in Singapore, and was required to fly to Bali as there were reports that Australian prisoners may be there. Purvis was concerned that the Japanese, who numbered some 10,000 troops, were still armed and could be hostile. On arrival at Denpasar the Japanese troops seemed unwilling to maintain order, so Purvis without authorisation from higher command decided to take positive action. He sent a message to the Japanese General demanding that the surrender would take place at 9 am the following morning. Purvis wrote that the General's aide, accompanied by eight other officers, arrived precisely on time, and handed over the General's sword. Realising that none of the officers could read English, Purvis on impulse signed the document "Franklin Delano Roosevelt".

== Southern Cross flies again ==
In 1944 plans to make a film about the life of Kingsford Smith were being discussed by Columbia Pictures in Australia. Southern Cross had been dismantled and placed in storage in Canberra, and as it was needed in Sydney for the film, it was completely overhauled and test flown in May 1945 by Wing Commander Purvis with John Kingsford Smith (Smithy's nephew) as co-pilot. The aircraft was then flown to Sydney by the same crew. This was the last flight of the famous aircraft before it was dismantled and taken by truck to Brisbane where it is on public display at Brisbane Airport. The film Smithy was released in Australia in 1946.

== Post War ==
Purvis was discharged from the RAAF in August 1946 and continued his flying career as Chief Pilot for the Herald newspaper, delivering the Sydney Morning Herald to country towns in New South Wales.

In 1951 Purvis was co-pilot and engineer on a pioneering flight to South America with Captain P. G. Taylor. The purpose was to carry out a survey flight on behalf of Qantas, and the aircraft selected was a RAAF Catalina registered VH-ASA named Frigate Bird II. The flight departed Sydney on 13 March 1951 and arrived in Chile on 26 March 1951. The return flight arrived back in Sydney on 21 April 1951. The aircraft used on this record-breaking flight is on public display in the Sydney Powerhouse Museum.

In 1963 Purvis was contacted by Eddie Connellan, proprietor of Connellan Airways and asked to ferry a De Havilland Heron from Delhi in India to Alice Springs . Following the delivery Purvis remained in Alice Springs in order to train pilots on the new aircraft type, which included flights throughout the Northern Territory and a period based in Darwin. When the task was completed, Connellan invited Purvis to base himself at Ayers Rock to operate scenic flights on behalf of the airline. In the early 1970s Connellan decided to concentrate on his airline's regular routes and transferred the Ayers Rock operation to the Adelaide-based company SAATAS (South Australian and Territory Air Service). By then Purvis had gained ownership of the "Inland Motel" and the "Ayers Rock Hotel", but was able to continue the scenic flights in a Cessna 205 (VH-RCF) until 1975. In a career spanning fifty years, Purvis had flown 25,000 hours and was one of Australia's true pioneer aviators. He retired to Cairns Queensland, and died in 1980 aged 71. His funeral service was held in Brisbane.

== Purvis autobiography ==
- Outback Airman: by Harry Purvis with Joan Priest (Rigby Ltd, 1979)
