= Strong Is the Seed =

Strong is the Seed
- Directed by: Arthur Greville Collins
- Written by: Ru Pullan
- Based on: radio play The Golden Legacy by Helen Bousfield
- Produced by: Arthur Greville Collins
- Starring: Guy Doleman
- Cinematography: Ross Wood
- Edited by: William Shepherd
- Music by: Henry Krips
- Production company: Collins Productions
- Distributed by: Monarch Film Corporation (UK); Ray Films (Australia 1952 release)
- Release date: 4 March 1949
- Running time: 80 mins (Aust); 58 mins (England)
- Country: Australia
- Language: English
- Budget: £20,000

Strong is the Seed (also known as The Farrer Story) is a 1949 Australian drama film, about the life of agronomist and plant breeder William Farrer.

== Synopsis ==
English agriculture scientist William Farrer, on a health trip to Australia, advises his friends (Ossie Wenban, Queenie Ashton) to invest money in wheat farming. In a hotel in Queanbeyan, Farrer hears that rust is playing havoc with farmers' crops, and his friends, who were ruined, have both just committed suicide. Searching for a cure for rust, Farrer meets Nina De Salis, daughter of a politician. They fall in love and get married, though her father strongly disapproves.

Nina and Farrer cross strains of strong wheat at an experimental farm. Farrer is encouraged by government scientist Dr. Guthrie. However farmers plot to burn his farm and millers will not grind new strains of wheat from Farrer for flour. Farrer keeps at his work and inherits money from relatives in England. He is finally recognised for his achievements, hands over his work to his young assistant (Eric Wright), and soon afterwards he collapses and dies in his office.

== Cast ==
- Guy Doleman as William Farrer
- Marie Marsden as Nina de Salis
- Lloyd Lamble as Dr Guthrie
- Ossie Wenban
- Queenie Ashton
- Enid Lorimer

== The Golden Legacy ==
Helen Bousfield wrote a radio play about the life of William Farrer, The Golden Legacy.

== Production ==
In 1947 a prospectus was issued for the Arthur Collins Film Corporation, seeking to raise finance to make a film of this play. The company also announced intentions to make three more films a year.

The film was shot in and around Bathurst, New South Wales and Minto, New South Wales and in a studio at the Sydney Showground from November 1947, with shooting taking six weeks. Henry Krips composed the music.

== Reception ==
The film was intended to be released in July 1948 at the same time as a stamp commemorating Farrer. However, although post-production had been completed by June, reactions at previews indicated the film was not up to standard for commercial release – director Harry Watt, then in Australia making Eureka Stockade (1949), saw it and called the film "the all-time low in horrible amateurism".

Several scenes were deleted, new ones shot, and a new soundtrack and music score added. The film still failed to find distribution and the production company released the film themselves by hiring a theatre in Adelaide in March 1949. Box office receipts and reviews were poor, although it did achieve release in the UK in a much shortened version.

The film was re-released in Australia in 1952, greatly shortened, as The Farrer Story.

== See also ==
- Cinema of Australia
