= Lois Green =

Australian actress (1914–2006)

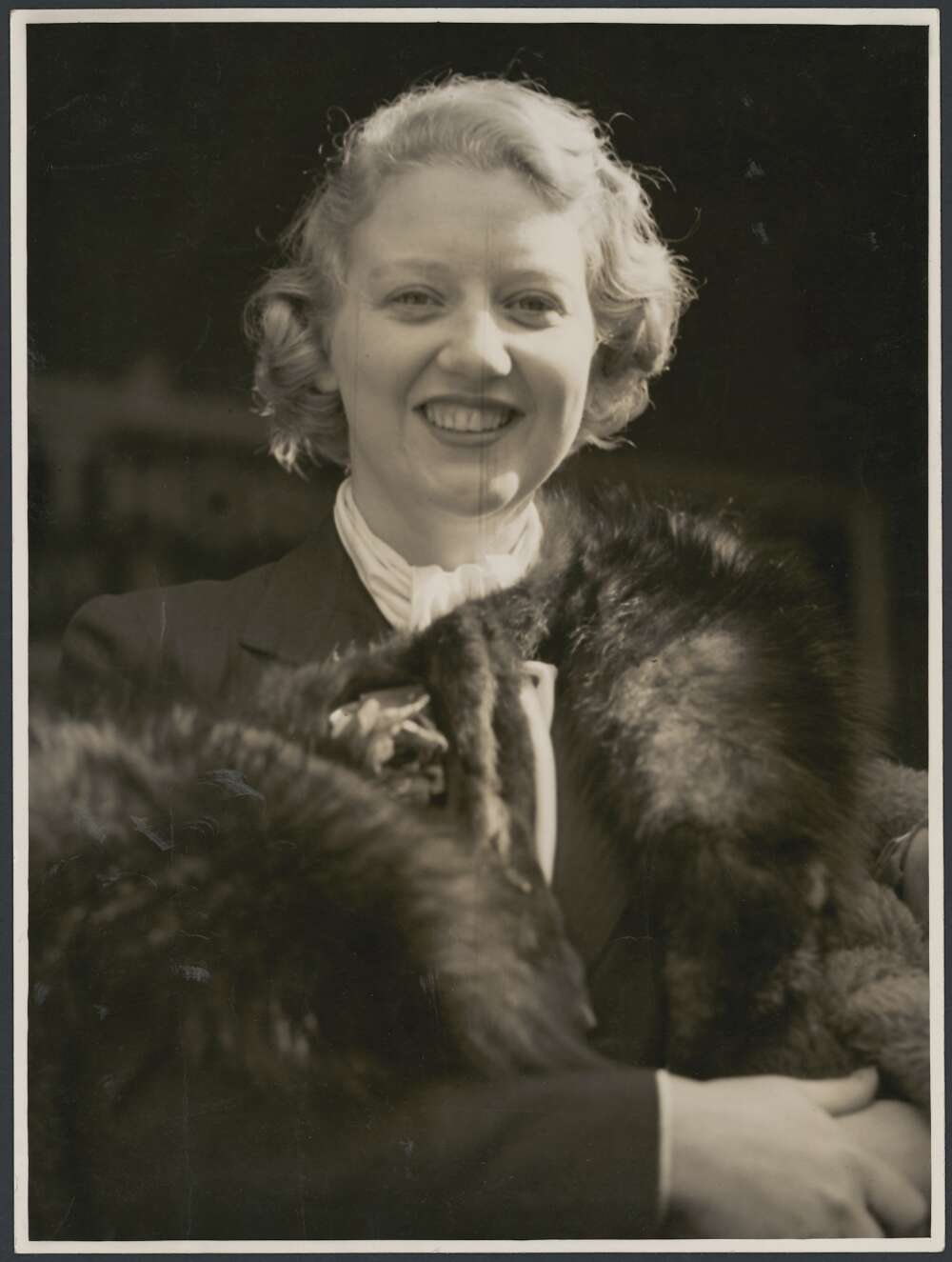
- Green, c. 1939
- Born: Mabel Lois Green; December 1914; Footscray, Victoria, Australia
- Died: 2006
- Occupations: Actress, singer, dancer
- Years active: c. 1930–1956
- Spouses: William John Munden (m. 1942; div.); Hugh Falkener Eagleton (m. 1947)

Lois Green (1914–2006) born Mabel Lois Green, was an Australian actress who worked extensively on stage. She started as a child and was known for singing, dancing and acting in Australia and the United Kingdom.

== Early life ==
Green was born Mabel Lois Green in Melbourne, in December 1914, the only child of Beaumont Hamilton Green, a carriage-builder, and his wife Mabel (née Trethewey).

She made her stage debut aged five and worked extensively as a singer, actor and dancer. She had dancing lessons from Jennie Brenan who supplied many dancers for J.C.Williamson's company.

== Career ==
In the 1930s she toured extensively with J.C. Williamsons Ltd. Her first professional engagement appears to have been in the ballet sequences of a 1930 revival of The Maid of the Mountains starring Gladys Moncrieff. From 1930 she was almost continuously employed by J. C. Williamson's, appearing in musical comedies, operettas and pantomimes including Katinka, Sinbad the Sailor, Blue Mountain Melody (1934), Ball at the Savoy (1935) and Over She Goes (1937). In the early 1930s she performed alongside the young Robert Helpmann, and in the 1934 Australian musical Blue Mountain Melody she appeared with Cyril Ritchard, Madge Elliott and Don Nicol.

Her leading role as the title character in No, No, Nanette in 1938 brought her national prominence.

She moved to London in 1939 after making Ken G. Hall's Cinesound film Gone to the Dogs, playing the ingénue Jean MacAllister opposite comedian George Wallace Reviewing the film Filmink described Green as "pretty, can act, sing and dance, and is full of charm; she’s wonderful." Her first London work was in the chorus of the revue All Clear at the Queen's Theatre, where she understudied Beatrice Lillie, and she sang at the Café de Paris in an act with the comedian Fred Emney.

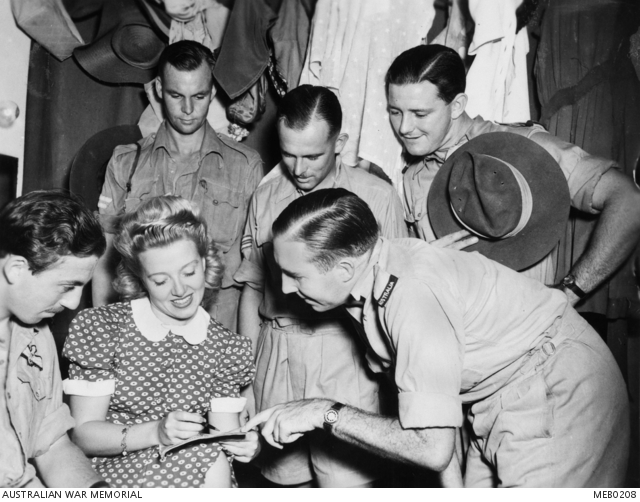
Lois Green in Cairo with RAAF airmen during the interval of the musical "No, No, Nanette!".

During World War II, she toured the Middle East with ENSA and worked on radio and television. By mid-1944 she was in Cairo performing for ENSA, and at the end of the war returned to London, where she played the title role in the pantomime Cinderella at the Adelphi Theatre to positive reviews.

In late 1946 J. C. Williamson's flew Green back to Australia to appear in the musical comedy Follow the Girls, in which she played the strip-tease artist Bubbles La Marr. The Argus noted her "metamorphosis from sweet ingenue to wisecracking, and slightly hardboiled, comedienne". The production closed in May 1947, after which she returned to England.

Green appeared in revues, radio and the early days of live television, but became best known for Christmas pantomime, including Puss in Boots (1949–50) at the London Palladium with Tommy Trinder, and touring productions of Cinderella, one of them with Harry Secombe.

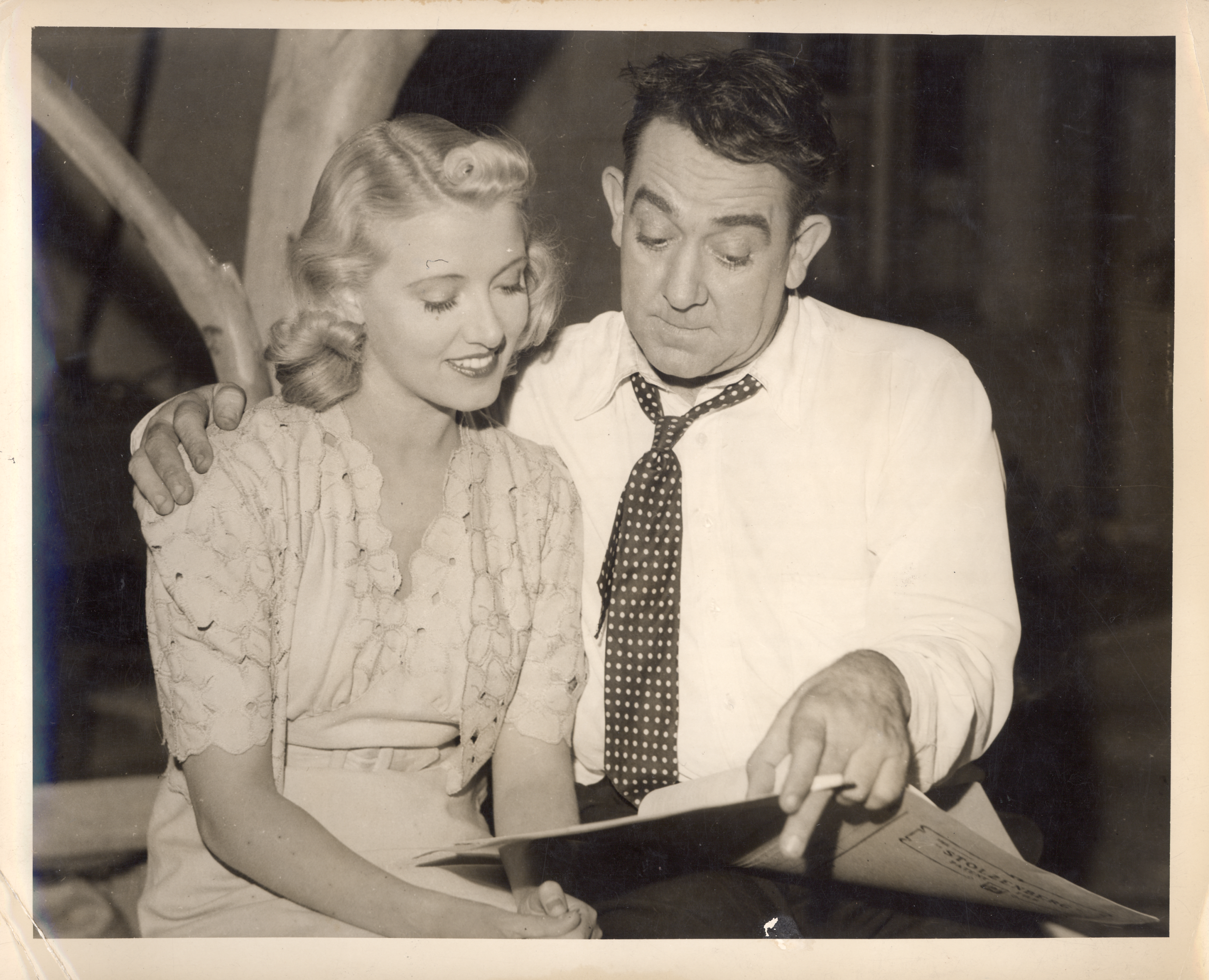
Lois Green and Australian comedian, George Wallace in 1940.

In 1954 she had a supporting role as Lady Plymdale in Noël Coward's musical After the Ball, directed by Robert Helpmann, which ran for 188 performances at the Globe Theatre. Her last known performances were in a Glasgow run of Cinderella in 1956.

== Later life and death ==
Green and Eagleton lived for many years in South Kensington before moving to the Isle of Man. According to several online sources she died there in 2006, although this has not been independently confirmed.

Filmink said she "never became the film star she should have been."

== Personal life ==
In August 1940 she sailed to South Africa, where she married the commission agent William John Munden in Johannesburg in 1942. Their marriage had ended by 1947 when she married the British businessman Hugh Falkener Eagleton in London.

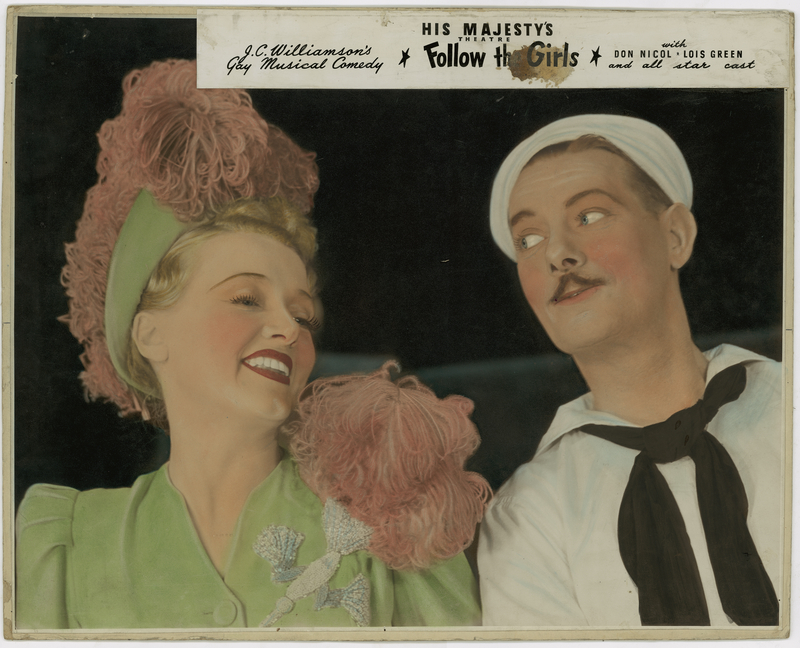
Don Nicol and Lois Green in Follow The Girls.

== Credits ==
- Katja (1937) - stage musical
- No, No, Nanette (1938) - stage
- Jill Darling (1938) - play
- Gone to the Dogs (1939) - film
- All Clear (1939)- London revue
- Cafe de Paris (1940) - revue
- Follow the Girls (1946–47) - stage musical with Don Nicol
- No, No, Nanette (1948) - British TV
- Jill Darling (1949) - British TV
- Happy Week-End (1949) - British TV
- Cinderella (1950) - British TV
- After the Ball (1954) - stage musical
