= Alec Kellaway =

South African actor

- Born: 1894
- Died: 18 January 1973 (aged 78–79)
- Citizenship: South Africa
- Occupation: actor
- Relatives: Cecil Kellaway (brother)

Alec Kellaway (1894–18 January 1973) was a South African–born actor best known for his work in Australian theatre and film, notably playing a number of character roles for director Ken G. Hall. He was the brother of Cecil Kellaway. He also worked as a producer in vaudeville and helped run the Talent School at Cinesound Productions.

Kellaway played a wide variety of roles for Ken Hall, ranging from a gay floorwalker in Dad and Dave Come to Town (1938) to a magician in Let George Do It (1938). Hall wrote in his memoirs that the actor "was never Alec Kellaway in any of them – a contrast to many actors, who play themselves in whatever part you give them. Alec always studied the part, got to really understand the person he was to play, then worried about how he would walk, talk, think." His performance in Dad and Dave Come to Town has been described as "considering era... a remarkably positive description of a gay man."

During the 1940s Kellaway returned to the stage appearing in musicals such as Annie Get Your Gun and Paint Your Wagon. When television began in Australia he became an executive at Channel 9 working on their variety shows. Illness forced him to retire in late 1972 and he died in January 1973. He was survived by his brothers Jack and Cecil; his sister Dolly died the previous year.

After a break of two decades, he returned to Australian screens in the role of the Abbot in the 1970's comedy Squeeze a Flower.

== Selected filmography ==
- Lovers and Luggers (1937)
- The Broken Melody (1938)
- Let George Do It (1938)
- Dad and Dave Come to Town (1938)
- Gone to the Dogs (1939)
- Come Up Smiling (1939)
- Dad Rudd, MP (1940)
- South West Pacific (1943)
- Smithy (1946)
- The Kangaroo Kid (1950)
- Squeeze a Flower (1970)
