= Frank Coffey =

Australian author, cameraman, director and screenwriter

Frank Coffey was an Australian author, cameraman, director, and screenwriter who worked mostly on the production of documentaries. For a number of years, he was in-house writer for Cinesound Productions.

Coffey worked in the camera department of Cinesound in the early 1930s. In 1935 he joined Charles Chauvel as assistant cameraman on Uncivilised.

In the late 1940s, he was charge of documentary productions for Movietone.

== Select credits ==
- The Hayseeds (1933) – editor
- Grandad Rudd (1934) – camera department
- Strike Me Lucky (1934) – camera department
- When the Kellys Rode (1934) – camera department
- Uncivilised (1936) – assistant director
- Rangle River (1936) – editor
- A Nation is Built (1938) – editor
- Gone to the Dogs (1939) – story editor
- That Certain Something (1941) – camera, editor
- Will There Be a Second Front in Europe? (1942) – editor
- 100,000 Cobbers (1943) – writer, editor
- Jungle Patrol (1944) – editor
- film about Newcastle (1947) – director, writer
- Isle of Bounty (1949) – camera
