= Connie Martyn =

Australian actress

Constance Elizabeth Martyn (4 December 1886 – 27 May 1971) was an Australian actress of stage and screen best known for playing Ma Rudd in Dad and Dave Come to Town.

== Select filmography ==
- The Woman Suffers (1918)
- Dad and Dave Come to Town (1938)
- Dad Rudd MP (1940)

== Select theatre credits ==
- Little Lord Fauntleroy (1909–10)
- Her Forbidden Marriage (1914)
- Married to the Wrong Man (1915)
- For King and Country (1915)
- A Woman Adrift (1915)
- Kultur (1916)
- The Night Side of London (1917)
- East Lynne (1917)
- The Bad Girl of the Family (1917)
- Between Two Women (1918)
- Sons of the Empire (1922)
