= Dad and Dave Come to Town =

1938 comedy film by Ken G. Hall

- Australian theatrical release poster
- Directed by: Ken G. Hall
- Written by: Bert Bailey; Frank Harvey
- Based on: On Our Selection by Steele Rudd
- Produced by: Ken G. Hall
- Starring: Bert Bailey; Fred MacDonald; Shirley Ann Richards
- Cinematography: George Heath
- Edited by: William Shepherd
- Music by: Hamilton Webber
- Production company: Cinesound Productions
- Distributed by: British Empire Films
- Release dates: 30 September 1938 (Australia); 1939 (United Kingdom); 1943 (United States)
- Running time: 97 minutes (Australia); 78 minutes (international)
- Country: Australia
- Language: English
- Budget: £12,000-£23,000
- Box office: £75,000

Dad and Dave Come to Town is a 1938 Australian comedy film directed and produced by Ken G. Hall and written by Bert Bailey and Frank Harvey. The third installment in the Dad and Dave film series, it is based on the 1899 short story collection On Our Selection by Steele Rudd and stars Bailey, Ann Richards, Fred MacDonald, Billy Rayes, including Peter Finch in his feature film acting debut.

== Plot ==
Life is busy on the Rudd farm: Dave keeps inventing things, Joe has a tooth ache, Billy Ryan wants to marry Sarah Rudd but Dad is feuding with Billy's father, Old Man Ryan, who wants to buy Dad's bottom paddock.

Dad receives news that his brother, Alfred, whom he has not seen for 20 years, has died and left Dad a house in the city, Bellavista, along with a shop that sells women's clothes called Cecille's. Dad moves to the city with Dave, Mum and daughter Jill. He discovers that the store is struggling, and is unaware that the store's manager, Rawlins, is secretly in league with a rival shop owner, Pierre, who wants to take over Cecille's.

Dad puts Jill in charge and she starts rejuvenating the store, impressing the effeminate floorwalker, Entwistle. She discovers Rawlins' treachery and forces him to resign, replacing him with Entwistle as manager. She hires a young press agent, Jim Bradley, who used to work for Pierre, to promote the store. Jill and Jim begin a romance. Dave falls for a store model called Myrtle and Mum is hounded out of the kitchen at Bellavista by the housekeeper, Miss Quince. Jill and Jim want to renovate Cecille's and put on a giant fashion show. Dad agrees and borrows money against his farm to finance it.

The show looks as though it is going to be a big success when Pierre reveals he lent Dad's brother £1,000 and calls in the debt the night before. Dad is inspired to keep going by some inspiring words from Mum, who fires Miss Quince. Pierre orders bailiffs to repossess Cecille's during the show, but Dave, Myrtle and Entwistle manage to stop them by getting Myrtle to lure them into a room and Dave knocking them out. Pierre then arrives with the police, but Dad is bailed out by Old Man Ryan, who pays the £1,000. The show is a big success, and Dad returns to the country, leaving Jill in charge of Cecille's, with a new appreciation for people who live in the city.

== Cast ==
- Bert Bailey as Dad Rudd
- Shirley Ann Richards (as Ann Richards) as Jill
- Fred MacDonald as Dave
- Billy Rayes as Jim Bradley
- Alec Kellaway as Entwistle
- Sidney Wheeler as Pierre
- Connie Martyn as Mum
- Ossie Wenban as Joe
- Valerie Scanlan as Sarah
- Peter Finch as Bill Ryan
- Muriel Ford as Myrtle
- Leila Steppe as Sonia
- Marshall Crosby as Ryan Snr
- Cecil Perry as Rawlings
- Billy Stewart as Bob Thompson
- Marie D'Alton as Miss Quince
- Leslie Victor as Brown
- Raymond Longford as Policeman

== Production ==
=== Writing ===
Hall made the movie because Cinesound Productions needed a guaranteed box office success. There had recently been a ruling that Australian films were no longer eligible as British under the local quotas in England, which hurt their ability to sell overseas. Hall needed to make a film which was appealed to local audiences and On Our Selection (1932) had just enjoyed a fifth run in Sydney, indicating the market was still strong for Dad and Dave movies. Hall preferred making drama – "It is so much cleaner", he said, "There is no mess of pies and so forth to be swept from the studio, as there is after slapstick" – but was not as sure-fire a genre as a Dad and Dave film.

In May 1938, as Cinesound were finishing Let George Do It, Hall announced they would make a Rudd film about Dad and Dave inheriting a store in the city. Hall said, "when we begin work on the new film, I will have to be careful about green, because Bert Bailey has all the theatrical hatred of the colour. When we were producing the first of the Dad and Dave films. Dave wore a green vest, and Mr. Bailey blamed everything that went wrong on the set to that vest."

"I'm fully prepared for verbal onslaughts from a certain section of the public that considers we are ruining Australia's prestige overseas", said Hall before filming. "In fact, it's the English markets that vitally concern us. But as our pictures have been subjected to certain restrictions there, we have cut our cloth to suit our pocket. Cinesound's next picture will be made for Australian audiences."

Hall added that "I know that a handful of people will criticise us for continuing to burlesque the Australian cockney In 'Dad and Dave Come to Town', but it will be entertainment, and that, after all, is what patrons pay for. Dad and Dave no more represent the man on the land than Ralph Lynn, the 'silly ass' comedian, represents the average Englishman. But Lynn is funny, and so are Dad and Dave. After all, 'On Our Selection' has made more money in Australia than any other picture-American and English included."

Unlike the first two Dad and Dave films, this was not based on a play by Bailey but an original story by Ken G. Hall. Hall claims he asked his regular writer Frank Harvey to develop a premise, but Harvey could not do it, and indeed threatened to resign prior to the scripting of the film because he felt he couldn't write comedy. However, Hall came up with a story and Harvey stayed on the film, ending up with a writing credit. Uncredited work was done on the script by Hall's "comedy team" of Jim Bancks, Hal Carleton and Bill Maloney. Hall later said "I dictated the plot, such as it was, it didn’t amount to anything much. We had conference after conference here with Jim Banks, Hal Carlton, Billy Maloney, friends of mine and people whom I knew knew theatre, and Harvey, and we evolved it. Think up the funny sequences and work them into the plot."

The humour was considerably more risque than normal for a Cinesound film.

Bailey said "wireless has helped to bring the Australian farmer in touch with the city, I admit that, but there are still thousands of country people who cannot afford a wireless. 'Dad' is modelled on the small farmer-not the squatter, who has his swimming pool, and parties guaranteed to show even the city dweller a thing or two. "In 'Dad and Dave Come to Town' we have modernised 'Dad and Dave,' but I think audiences will find the humour of these characters is still typical."

The character of Pierre, the villain, was described in the shooting script as "presumably a Frenchman, but in forgetful moments dropping into Jewish idiom". Entwistle was described as "a very gracious young man, effeminate without being revolting"

It has been argued this is one of the most personal films from director Hall in part because of the heroic publicity man character (the director used to be a publicist) but also because putting on a fashion show had many parallels to movie making.

=== Casting ===
Since Grandad Rudd Bert Bailey had been retired and Fred MacDonald working in Melbourne radio.

Bert Bailey and Fred MacDonald repeated their roles as Dad and Dave from the earlier films in the series, but the rest of the cast were newcomers. Ingenue Shirley Ann Richards, who was under long-term contract to Cinesound Productions was cast as Jill. Billy Rayes and Leila Steppe were both Americans touring on the Tivoli vaudeville circuit.

Peter Finch plays a young man in love with Dad Rudd's daughter Sarah (Valerie Scanlan). Finch had appeared in a short film, The Magic Shoes (1935), but this was his first feature. He was recommended to Hall by George Cross, Cinesound's casting director, and so impressed the director he was cast in the role. Hall said "I wanted a gangling youth who’d had some experience. George Cross said, “There’s this kid, who has been hanging around here”. He was a long, skinny, cadaverous looking country yokel. When I saw Peter I gave him a few lines and he spoke them beautifully in character, and from then on there was no doubt about Finch. But we didn’t know he was going to be Great; nobody knew he was going to be Great."

"He was almost painfully thin in his early days, with high, prominent cheekbones, and his looks gave no real promise of the handsome, world-class screen star he matured into overseas", wrote Hall in his memoirs. "But from the beginning he was a really first-class actor." Indeed, Hall later cast Finch in a larger role in Mr. Chedworth Steps Out (1939).

Valerie Scanlan was an 18-year-old Sydney actor who had come to the attention of George Cross in an amateur production of Men Without Wives. It was her first film role.

Muriel Flood was a former vaudeville actor who was a well known radio personality "Susie" on 2GB.

=== Filming ===
Principal photography started in June 1938. Norman Rydge said "The restrictions which have been placed upon Australian pictures under the new British Film Quota Act have quickened rather than retarded production in our studios. While we feel that these restrictions will eventually be lifted, we are, in the meantime, adapting ourselves to the new conditions by making films with a greater appeal to Australian audiences."

The film was shot at Cinesound's Bondi studio and on location in Camden. In contrast with On Our Selection, an estimated 75% of which was shot on location, only 20% of Dad and Dave Come to Town was filmed outside the studio.

The fashion show involved 45 dresses designed by Mavis Ripper worth £2,000 worn by 18 different girls.

Eric Thompson designed the elaborate sets.

== Reception ==
=== Critical ===
Reviews were extremely positive. The Bulletin called it " an uproarious hotchpotch of damnfoolery, fallabout, occasional burlesque and good honest fun."

The film was a success at the box office, Ken G. Hall later calling it a "very substantial hit", which matched the earnings of On Our Selection in Australia and exceeded them in New Zealand. Variety said "it broke records everywhere".

It led to a fourth (and final) entry in the series, Dad Rudd, MP (1940), in which many of the cast of this film reprised their roles.

=== Overseas release ===
The film was released in England as The Rudd Family Goes to Town, and was the first Australian movie to screen in a cinema on the West End. According to Hall, it earned over £35,000 in Britain. It was released in the US as The Farmer Goes to Town.

Hall said in 1939 that "It just goes to show that the characters of ' Dad and Dave ' which many regard as presenting Australians in an unfavorable light, are international in their appeal and that they arc refreshing in their individual type of modern entertainment."

== Legacy ==
In one scene, Jill (Shirley Ann Richards) says to Jim Bradley (Billy Rayes), "Don't call me girlie". This line was used as the title for a 1985 documentary about women in the Australian film industry.

The character of Entwistle (Alec Kellaway), the effeminate floorwalker who works at the fashion store, is a rare gay character in early Australian cinema. Although a stereotype, he is depicted as a loyal friend of the hero – the "first upfront camp male character to be treated in a positive fashion" and was so popular with audiences he returned in Dad Rudd, MP (1940).

Stephen Vagg described the film as one of Hall's most personal:"Through this film, it seems that Ken Hall was really able to demonstrate his love of making movies, and the people he collaborated with while making them: performers, publicists, designers, and so on (as well as pay back the people he disliked – ruthless competitors, back stabbers)."

== Notes ==
- Hall, Ken G. Directed by Ken G. Hall, Lansdowne Press, 1977
- Murray, Scott, ed. (1994). Australian Cinema. St.Leonards, NSW.: Allen & Unwin/AFC. p. 23. ISBN 1-86373-311-6.
