= Ossie Wenban =

Ossie Wenban (1895–1978) was an Australian actor best known for his appearances in Cinesound's Dad Rudd films starring Bert Bailey.

== Select radio ==
- Boy from the Never Never (1949)
- I Want Haden (1951)
- episode of Chips (1951)
- Desire Shall Fail (1952)
- Hagen's Circus (1953)
- The Sundowners (1953)
- A Place Where You Whisper (1955)

== Select theatre ==
- What's in a Name (1931)
- The Chocolate Solder (1936)
- The Gondoliers (1937)
- The Bat (1937)
- The Evil Men Do (1964)

== Select films ==
- On Our Selection (1932)
- Dad and Dave Come to Town (1938)
- Dad Rudd, M.P. (1940)
- Strong Is the Seed (1949)
- Kangaroo (1952)
- Three in One (1957)
