= Port of Escape (unfinished film) =

- Directed by: John Calvert
- Produced by: Arthur Greville Collins
- Starring: John Calvert; Pilita Corrales
- Production company: Tas-American Television Corporation
- Release date: 1960 (intended)
- Running time: incomplete
- Country: Australia
- Language: English

Port of Escape was a proposed Australian feature film shot in 1960 from the Tas-American Television Corporation. It was directed by and starred American magician John Calvert. Although over £27,000 was spent on the film, it was never released and there is some doubt if it was ever completed.

== Background ==
John Calvert had visited Australia several times with his stage act, often announcing film projects. In 1950 he said he wanted to make four features there including one about Burke and Wills, but then he decided that was too dull a subject matter. He tried to get up another movie called Strange Horizons which he intended to make in Mackay but he was unable to get approval from Actors Equity to import the personnel he wanted.

Calvert was frequently involved in legal disputes while in Australia.

== Port of Escape ==
The film co-starred dancer Pilita Corrales who Calvert brought out to Australia with him in 1959. Calvert persuaded investors from Tasmania to fund the film, but it was never released. Calvert fled Australia with creditors unpaid. However Corrales stayed on in Australia and enjoyed a successful career there.
