= Nobody's Fool (1936 film) =

1936 film by Arthur Greville Collins

- Movie poster
- Directed by: Arthur Greville Collins
- Written by: Ralph Block; Ben Markson; Jerry Sackheim
- Story by: Frank Mitchell Dazey; Agnes Christine Johnston
- Produced by: Irving Starr
- Starring: Edward Everett Horton; Glenda Farrell; Cesar Romero
- Cinematography: Norbert Brodine
- Edited by: Morris Wright
- Production company: Universal Pictures
- Release date: June 1, 1936
- Running time: 75 minutes
- Country: United States
- Language: English

Nobody's Fool is a 1936 American comedy film directed by Arthur Greville Collins and written by Ralph Block, Ben Markson, and Jerry Sackheim. The film stars Edward Everett Horton, Glenda Farrell and Cesar Romero. The movie's working title was "Unconscious". It was released by Universal Pictures on June 1, 1936. A naive country boy goes to New York City where he gets mixed up with real estate swindlers.

== Plot ==
At the Better Business Boosters convention, Will Wright who works as a waiter, interrupts the guest speaker and asks him what can be done to improve the city's welfare. In response, George Baxter tells him that he would be happier living in New York. Will decides to leave town. After arriving in New York, he is mistaken for an economist named Mr. Wight. When Ruby Miller a con artists realized the mistake she quietly draws him away. Ruby, a member of a group of con artists plans to extort money from gangster Dizzy Rantz after discovering that he does not own a piece of land under his gambling house. Afraid of Dizzy's reaction, they ask Will to make the demand for them and convincing him that they will build apartments for working people if they gain access to Dizzy's land. When the group discovered that the land is actually owned by Mary Jones. They ask Will to charm Mary into signing the land over to him.

Dizzy who mistakenly believing that Will is connected to the District Attorney office, agreed to meet him. Meanwhile, Jake Cavendish the head of the group and Ruby's boyfriend is planning to murder Will. later, Will calls a meeting with Dizzy and the other member of the group including Jake and Ruby. Will suggests that the owners of the land should build affordable housing. Dizzy is hesitated until Mary says she will force Dizzy to move his buildings off her land. Dizzy and Jake formed a legitimate partnership. And Jake calls off the contract on Will's life, with Will given an honorary membership in the home development league of New York. Ruby who has fallen in love with Will, tells him to look her up.

== Cast ==
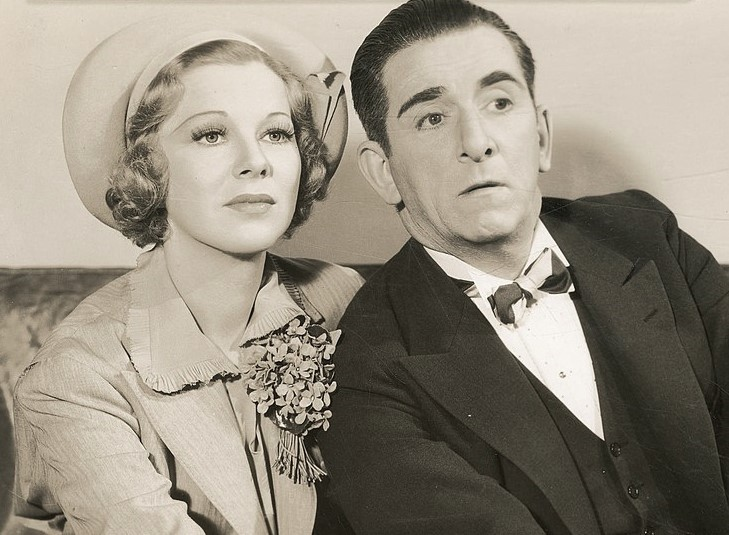
Glenda Farrell and Edward Everett Horton in Nobody's Fool (1936)

- Edward Everett Horton as Will Wright
- Glenda Farrell as Ruby Miller
- Cesar Romero as Dizzy Rantz
- Frank Conroy as Jake Cavendish
- Warren Hymer as Sour Puss
- Clay Clement as Fixer Belmore
- Henry Hunter as Doc
- Florence Roberts as Mary Jones
- Edward Gargan as Tom
- Pierre Watkin as George Baxter

== Production ==
Arthur Lubin said he was asked to reshoot and recut part of the film.

== Reception ==
The New York Times movie review said: "Nobody's Fool, which moved into the Albee Theatre in Brooklyn yesterday with Universal's splendid picturization of "Show Boat," makes its chief bid for fame as a harbinger of Summer doldrums in the cinema. A feeble mélange of soporific comedy and far-fetched melodrama, the new film works an unfair hardship on such talented comedians as Edward Everett Horton, Glenda Farrell and Warren Hymer—not to mention its audience. Put together with apparently more speed than inspiration, the film narrates the oft told story of a country yokel who comes to Manhattan and outsmarts a gang of real estate racketeers intent on defrauding a nice old lady of three feet of property in Fifty-third Street. That's the gist of "Nobody's Fool", which would probably make a compact three-reeler."
