= Emélie Polini =

English actress (1881 – 1927)

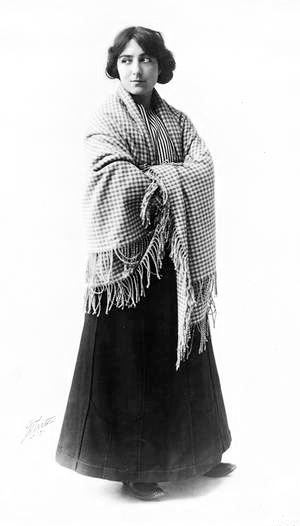
Emelie Polini as Fanny Hawthorn in the Broadway production of Hindle Wakes (1912)

Emélie Adeline Polini, generally written as Emelie, (24 March 1881 – 31 July 1927) was an English stage actress with a considerable career in Australia.

Polini was born in Steyning, Sussex, a daughter of theatrical manager Giovanni Marie Polini and his wife Harriet Frances, née Billings. Her acting career began in London, followed by work in companies touring in England and America. While on Broadway playing in Yes or No?, she was offered a contract with Australian firm J. C. Williamson by their agent E. J. Tait. In Australia she played Edward Clark's De Luxe Annie from April 1918 in Sydney and from July in Melbourne, where she married Lieutenant Ellis of the Royal Field Artillery, whom she had met on board the ship (he had been wounded in action and was on furlough). Her company next played Walter Hackett's The Invisible Foe then The Eyes of Youth. In 1919 she triumphantly toured Adelaide, Brisbane, Newcastle and New Zealand with revivals of De Luxe Annie and The Eyes of Youth. She returned to Sydney in 1920 with Monckton Hoffe's The Little Damozel and Kindling, then again toured with revivals before retiring in September 1920 to start a family.

She returned in 1922, starring in Edward Knoblock's My Lady's Dress with Frank Harvey, Henry Arthur Jones's The Lie, which toured to Adelaide and with revivals of her earlier successes in Perth and Hobart, followed in 1923 with a Sydney season of revivals and The Flaw, which she co-wrote with Doris Egerton Jones, and the farce French Leave, followed by another season of revivals in the other States. She left in April 1924 for London to visit her sister Marie Polini and her husband Owen Nares, both actors. She again appeared on stage in England and America, where she died, never having returned to Australia.

== Personal life ==
Emélie married Harold Wilfred "Hal" Ellis in a quiet ceremony in Melbourne on 16 July 1918. They bought a farm at Meadow Flats, 22 miles from Bathurst, New South Wales, using her savings of £1100 as deposit. Emélie retired from the stage in 1920 and on 8 October 1921 gave birth to a daughter, Patricia Marie Ellis. Her husband was unable to provide for his family and service the loan, and in March 1922 the mortgagee resumed the property, and Emélie returned to the stage, living in rented premises in Rose Bay and leaving Patricia with Harold and his mother, arranging to pay for a nurse. She asked him for a divorce, but he refused to enter into such proceedings. Emélie planned a trip to London to visit her sister Marie Nares and wished to take Patricia, but her ex-husband and his mother refused permission; she sought legal custody in an in camera hearing in the Equity Court which was denied by Mr. Justice Harvey.

Emélie Polini died either in Boston or New York leaving an estate, valued at over £8300, to her daughter, conditional on her being in the custody of her sister Mrs. Marie Nares. This condition was contested by Ellis, and found unlawful by Mr. Justice Long Innes of the Equity Court. Owen Nares concurred, believing the child was better off with her father and grandmother.

The story of Emélie Polini and her daughter was the inspiration for the play, Whose Child? by Millicent Preston-Stanley, (also known as Mrs. Crawford Vaughan).

== Footnote ==
Harold Wilfred Ellis remarried on 28 July 1938 to Evelyn Lestrange of Chatswood, New South Wales.
