= The Spirit of Gallipoli =

1928 film

- Directed by: Keith Gategood; William Green
- Written by: Hal Carleton
- Produced by: Keith Gategood; William Green
- Starring: Keith Gategood
- Cinematography: Jack Fletcher
- Distributed by: Fox Film Corporation
- Release date: 17 March 1928
- Running time: 5,000 feet
- Country: Australia
- Language: Silent

The Spirit of Gallipoli is a 1928 silent Australian film. Originally running at 5,000 feet length only 1,554 feet survive.

== Plot ==
A rebellious young man, Billy Austin, is conscripted into the Australian Army. Initially an unwilling soldier, he eventually becomes a good one, and dreams of serving with the ANZACs at Gallipoli. He eventually leaves the army, gets married and settles down on a farm.

== Cast ==
- Keith Gategood as Billy Austin
- William Green as Jack Thomas
- Samuel Harris as William Austin
- Gwen Sherwood as Mrs Austin
- Marie Miller as Gladys Merton

== Production ==
The film was made by two young army trainees of the 55th Battalion with a cast of amateurs in early 1928. It was a propaganda piece to promote the role of the army in peacetime. Army co-operation meant enabled several scenes to be shot at Liverpool camp.

The footage of the Gallipoli dream sequence is taken from the silent movie The Hero of the Dardanelles (1915).

== Release ==
Commercial reception appears to have been limited.
