= Saleslady =

1938 film

- Directed by: Arthur Greville Collins
- Written by: Marion Orth
- Based on: Nothing Down by Kubec Glasmon
- Produced by: Ken Goldsmith
- Starring: Anne Nagel; Weldon Heyburn; Harry Davenport
- Cinematography: Gilbert Warrenton
- Edited by: Russell F. Schoengarth
- Music by: Abe Meyer
- Production company: Monogram Pictures
- Distributed by: Monogram Pictures
- Release date: January 27, 1938
- Running time: 65 minutes
- Country: United States
- Language: English

Saleslady is a 1938 American romantic comedy drama film directed by Arthur Greville Collins and starring Anne Nagel, Weldon Heyburn and Harry Davenport. Based on the story Nothing Down by Kubec Glasmon, it was produced and distributed by Monogram Pictures.

== Plot ==
Heiress Mary wants to enjoy life on her own merits and moves away from her wealthy grandfather. She gets a job in a department store and meets and falls in love with colleague Bob Spencer. When, after their marriage, they are struggling financially she is tempted to go to her grandfather for help.

== Cast ==
- Anne Nagel as Mary Dakin Spencer
- Weldon Heyburn as Bob Spencer
- Harry Davenport as Miles Cannon
- Kenneth Harlan as Bigelow
- Harry Hayden as Steele
- Ruth Fallows as Lillian 'Lil' Clark
- John St. Polis as Crane
- Matty Kemp as Wheeler
- Doris Rankin as The Matron
- Don 'Red' Barry as Babcock
- Herbert Evans as The Butler

== Bibliography ==
- Fetrow, Alan G. . Sound films, 1927-1939: a United States Filmography. McFarland, 1992.
- Katchmer, George A. Eighty Silent Film Stars: Biographies and Filmographies of the Obscure to the Well Known. McFarland, 1991.
