= Diary of a Plain Citizen =

1940 radio serial by Frank Harvey

- Genre: drama series
- Running time: 15 mins (10:30 pm – 10:45 pm)
- Country of origin: Australia
- Language: English
- Syndicates: ABC
- Starring: Frank Harvey
- Written by: Frank Harvey
- Original release: October 1940 – December 1940

Diary of a Plain Citizen is a 1940 Australian radio serial by Frank Harvey. Harvey also played the lead role.

It consisted of a series of diary entries from an Australian citizen at the time of war. Episodes went for fifteen minutes and were broadcast weekly in the evenings.
