= Smithy (1946 film) =

1946 Australian adventure film

- Theatrical release poster
- Directed by: Ken G. Hall
- Written by: Ken G. Hall (as "John Chandler"); Alec Coppel
- Based on: an adaptation by Max Afford and Ken G. Hall
- Produced by: N. P. Pery
- Starring: Ron Randell; Muriel Steinbeck
- Cinematography: George Heath
- Edited by: Terry Banks
- Music by: Henry Krips
- Production company: Columbia Pictures
- Distributed by: Columbia Pictures
- Release date: 26 June 1946 (Australia)
- Running time: 119 minutes (Australia); 99 mins (US)
- Country: Australia
- Language: English
- Budget: £53,000 or £73,000
- Box office: over £50,000 (Australia) £50,000 (USA)

Smithy (also known as Southern Cross in the UK and Pacific Adventure in the US) is a 1946 Australian adventure film about pioneering Australian aviator Sir Charles Kingsford Smith directed by Ken G. Hall starring Ron Randell. It was Hall's last feature film as a director and has been called "a remarkably adult and downbeat movie, easily Hall’s most mature work in his career".

== Plot ==
In 1943 in the South-West Pacific, some Australian and American airmen discuss the story of "Smithy", Charles Kingsford Smith. The Americans are told the story by an old officer of his, along with a waiter, Stringer, who knew him.

The story starts in 1917 with his recovering from a wound incurred in fighting over the Western Front. Kingsford Smith is rewarded with the Military Cross from the King.

When the war ends, Kingsford Smith is determined to make a career out of flying. He attempts to enter the England to Australia Air Race in 1919 but is stopped by Prime Minister Billy Hughes. He then decides to become the first person to fly from the United States to Australia across the Pacific.

Kingsford Smith travels to the United States, staying with his brother Harold in San Francisco, to try and raise funds for the trip. While on the train to San Francisco he flirts with an American girl, Kay Sutton. Kingsford Smith is unsuccessful in raising finance and returns to Australia, working as a commercial pilot. He meets Charles Ulm who also wants to fly across the Pacific. In order to attract attention, they break the record for flying around Australia. Kingsford Smith buys the plane, an aircraft called The Southern Cross, but struggles to raise finance.

Kingsford Smith returns to the USA where Hubert Wilkins warns him that even if he is successful, he will not reap the benefits of his work in his life. He meets up with Kay, as originally planned on the train.

Ulm and Kingsford Smith attempt to raise funds by breaking an endurance record, but are unsuccessful. However Kay introduces Kingsford Smith and Ulm to Captain Alan Hancock. Hancock is enthusiastic about supporting Kingsford Smith in order to strengthen the links between America and Australia, especially in case they ever go to war against Japan. Hancock's support enables them to raise the money.

In 1928, Ulm and Kingsford Smith and two Americans cross the Pacific in The Southern Cross. Before he leaves, Kingsford Smith says goodbye to Kay who, it is hinted, is facing some secret tragedy. The flight is successful and Kingsford Smith becomes world-famous. He gives a young boy, "Bluey" Truscott, a joy ride in a plane.

Kingsford Smith crashes in the desert and Keith Vincent Anderson and "Bobby" Hitchcock die looking for him. Kingsford Smith then meets and marries Mary Powell, flying the Atlantic in between. He attempts to set up his own airline but is not successful, particularly after the loss of The Southern Cloud. When the government give the England-Australia airmail contract to another airline, Kingsford Smith is forced to take people on joy flights to make a living. He breaks another record, crossing the Pacific from the Australia to the United States in a single engine aircraft with P.G. Taylor.

Kingsford Smith almost dies flying to New Zealand with Bill Taylor and John Stannage, and subsequently, retires the Southern Cross.

In 1935 he attempts to fly from Australia to England but disappears over the Indian Ocean.

== Cast ==
- Ron Randell as Charles Kingsford Smith
- Muriel Steinbeck as Mary Powell
- John Tate as Charles Ulm
- Joy Nichols as Kay Sutton
- Nan Taylor as Nan Kingsford Smith
- John Dunne as Harold Kingsford Smith
- Alec Kellaway as Captain Allan Hancock
- John Dease as Sir Hubert Wilkins
- Marshall Crosby as Arthur Powell
- Edward Smith as Beau Sheil
- Alan Herbert as Tommy Pethybridge
- John Fleeting as Keith Anderson
- Joe Valli as Stringer
- G.J. Montgomery-Jackson as Warner
- Gundy Hill as Lyon
- William Morris Hughes as himself
- Captain P.G. Taylor as himself
- John Stannage as himself
- Bud Tingwell as an RAAF control tower officer

== Development ==
=== Conception ===
Smithy was the idea of N.P. Pery, the managing director of Columbia Pictures in Australia. The Australian government had restricted the export of capital during the war, and Pery thought making a film could use up some of that money. Pery was quoted as saying "I do not think I am indulging in Utopian fancies when I say that Australia, or rather, some spot in Australia, could be made the Hollywood of the British Commonwealth." Pery approached Ken G. Hall, who was Australia's most commercially successful director, and asked him to make a film about an Australian who was well known internationally. Hall wrote that he briefly considered Don Bradman but dismissed the idea because Bradman was not known in the United States. The three main candidates were Ned Kelly, Dame Nellie Melba and Charles Kingsford Smith. Hall said he decided against Kelly because too many films had been made about him. Melba was rejected because of the costs involved with producing opera sequences and the difficulty of finding an appropriate singer to stand in for Melba. That left Kingsford Smith, who appealed in part because of his connection to the United States. Filmink argued "the Kingsford Smith story clearly had huge resonance for" Hall:

The story of a man who enters a glamorous, dangerous industry, and achieves a lot of success and acclaim, but can never quite succeed in establishing a workable long-term business model in said industry, who is constantly scrounging for finance, going around with a cap in hand to government officials and financiers for more money, being endlessly criticised by know-it-alls, and who is aware of the importance of publicity and a strong team.

=== Scripting ===
Hall commissioned treatments from several writers, including Jesse Lasky, Jr., who was then stationed at Cinesound Productions with the US Signal Corps; Josephine O'Neill, a Sydney film critic; Kenneth Slessor, film critic and poet; and Max Afford, one of Australia's leading playwrights and radio writers. Early drafts focused on Smithy's first flight across the Pacific but then Hall decided to cover most of Smithy's life.

Hall felt Afford's version was the best and the two of them developed a detailed treatment. Afford signed a contract in June 1944.

The treatment was adapted by Alec Coppel, an Australian writer who had enjoyed success in London and returned to Australia during the war. Sydney journalist Norman Ellison provided research.

The film invented some fictional characters, such as Kay Sutton, an American girl who romances Smithy and helps him raise funds to fly across the Pacific.

=== Casting ===
Ken G. Hall looked at 60 applicants to play the title role in Smithy, screen testing eight.

Hall claimed the choice came down to Peter Finch and Ron Randell, a radio and theatre actor. Hall preferred Finch but sent extensive screen tests of both actors with Muriel Steinbeck back to Columbia in Hollywood. The studio picked Randell on the grounds of his greater romantic appeal. Muriel Steinbeck later confirmed that Hall wanted Finch but Columbia did not feel he had sufficient "sex appeal." She said that Hall then wanted Dick Bentley but Columbia did not want to cast a comedian. Ron Randell was cast instead.

Muriel Steinbeck was the only actor considered for the female lead in Smithy. She had previously appeared with Randell in A Son Is Born, a film whose release was held up to take advantage of publicity for Smithy.

== Shooting ==
Although Smithy was entirely financed by Columbia Pictures, Ken G. Hall made it using his Cinesound crew and shot it mostly at Cinesound's studio in Bondi.

The aircraft used in Smithy was the genuine Southern Cross, which had been purchased by the Australian Government 10 years earlier and refurbished by the RAAF. A surplus RAAF CAC Boomerang was used in flying sequences for Kingsford Smith's Lady Southern Cross Lockheed Altair.

Two former co-pilots of Kingsford Smith, P.G. Taylor and Harry Purvis played themselves, as did former Prime Minister Billy Hughes. Hall says Alec Coppel had written a scene where Kingsford Smith tried to persuade Hughes to let him compete in an air race and Hughes switches off his hearing aid. Hughes was sensitive, however, about his deafness and reference to it was removed in the shooting script.

Smithy featured the first on screen appearance of noted Australian actor Charles "Bud" Tingwell who was cast as a RAAF control tower officer – winning the role as he could supply his own RAAF uniform.

== Reception ==
Smithy had its world premiere at a gala screening in Sydney on 26 June 1946, attended by the cast and crew, the Premier of New South Wales, and Shirley Ann Richards, who was visiting Australia at the time.

=== Critical ===
Reviews were generally positive, although not without criticisms.

Variety said it "may well be the best Aussie-produced pic to date... a milestone in local film-making. It should do well at British Empire boxoffices, and has a good chance in America."

Writing in 2019, Stephen Vagg described Muriel Steinbeck's "wife" part as "a decent one – she gets to flirt, and worry and fight, and the film improves immeasurably once her character becomes part of the action."

=== US release ===
Smithy was released in the United States as Pacific Adventure.

The Los Angeles Times noted the film "while technically acceptable is pretty much a stereotype of all the other histories of aviation pioneering... Ron Randell makes a likeable hero."

The New York Times wrote that "... it is unfortunate that the people who made this picture ... did not draw a more exciting and exacting drama out of the colourful career of the noted airman."

Variety said "the aviator's exploits might well have been filmed into a telling and forceful biopic, but this Columbia version is singularly dull. Picture's documentary style fails to build audience interest and the market for this entry obviously lies in the double bills... Ron Randell... is forthright and virile enough as Smith but poor direction and a faulty script fail to give him an opportunity to exhibit his true thesping prowess."

The film was not a success in America. Hall attributed this to the fact the film was re-edited to a much shorter running time. Randell later said, "Americans are not sufficiently familiar with the many personalities besides Sir Charles Kingsford-Smith who were depicted in the picture."

=== Box office ===
Smithy was the third-most popular film released in Australia in 1946.

== Legacy ==
Pery was keen for Columbia to make further films in Australia. Harry Cohn, head of Columbia, however, was opposed to the idea. He later arranged for Smithy to be drastically re-cut and re-edited for its US release, calling it Pacific Adventure, removing references to Australia, along with Pery's credit. Filmink argued "while Smithy is a film to be treasured, admired and enjoyed, it’s a little sad watching it" because it was Hall's last feature.

Cohn did offer Ron Randell a long-term contract in Hollywood, which the actor accepted.
