= A Nation Is Built =

Film celebrating Australia's Sesquicentenary

- Directed by: Frank Hurley
- Written by: Frank Hurley
- Produced by: Frank Hurley
- Narrated by: Harry Dearth
- Cinematography: Frank Hurley
- Edited by: Frank Coffey
- Production company: Cinesound Productions
- Release date: 12 February 1938
- Running time: 46 minutes
- Country: Australia
- Language: English
- Budget: £5,000

A Nation is Built is a 1938 Australian documentary directed by Frank Hurley.
