= Let George Do It (1938 film) =

- Directed by: Ken G. Hall
- Written by: George Wallace; Frank Harvey
- Based on: story by Hal Carleton
- Produced by: Ken G. Hall
- Starring: George Wallace; Joe Valli
- Cinematography: George Heath
- Edited by: William Shepherd
- Music by: Hamilton Webber; Maurie Gilman
- Production company: Cinesound Productions
- Distributed by: British Empire Films (Aust); ABFD (UK)
- Release dates: 17 June 1938 (Australia); 1940 (UK)
- Running time: 79 mins (Australia)
- Country: Australia
- Language: English
- Budget: £21,000

Let George Do It is a 1938 comedy starring popular stage comedian George Wallace. It was the first of two films Wallace made for Ken G. Hall at Cinesound Productions, the other one being Gone to the Dogs (1939). Hall later called Wallace "in my opinion, easily the best comedian that this country has produced."

== Synopsis ==
Joe Blake works as a stage hand in a vaudeville theatre headlined by Mysto the magician. When he finds out that the girl he is in love with, Molly, is getting married, he gets drunk with his friend Happy Morgan and decides to commit suicide. Joe offers to leave all his possessions to a gangster, Zilch, if Zilch will arrange a painless death for Joe.

The next day Joe finds out he has received an inheritance and wants to live, but Zilch and his men, including Unk, abduct Joe and demand half his money. Joe escapes with the help of Clara, a woman who has a crush on him, resulting in a wild speedboat chase across Sydney Harbour.

== Cast ==
- George Wallace as Joe Blake
- Gwen Munro as Molly
- Harry Abdy as Elmer Zilch
- Letty Craydon as Clara
- Alec Kellaway as Mysto the Great
- Joe Valli as 'Happy' Morgan
- Neil Carlton as John Randall
- George Lloyd as Unk

== Production ==
Stuart F. Doyle signed George Wallace to a contract with Cinesound in February 1937. It was originally announced that he would be making Gone to the Dogs, set against a background of greyhound racing. That turned out to be Wallace's second Cinesound movie; this was the first. Ken Hall later said:

Wallace... was a visual comic and easily, in my opinion, the best comedian that this country has produced. He was a pantomime comedian in the Chaplin tradition which belongs on the screen. He didn’t have to say the words, he could tell it all with a look, an expression or a movement. Wallace was a naturally funny man. No ‘funny’ make-up such as Mo [Roy Rene] used. Just himself. He didn’t get as far as he should have done, although he did exceptionally well for us and we had great success with his pictures.

As with most Cinesound comedies of the late 1930s, Hall employed a team of comedy writers to help with the script along with credited screenwriters Wallace and Frank Harvey. This consisted of Hall, cartoonist Jimmy Bancks, Bill Maloney and Hal Carleton. The story followed a formula developed in Wallace's Ticket in Tatts: "George is given a simple labourer's job... Quite innocently is fired... He then becomes involved in a simple wish-fulfilment device... the device is complicated by an equally simple set of stereotyped gangsters who have no motivation beyond innate greed for greater wealth, and in each situation they are foiled, usually accidentally, by George and his friends." Hall later said:

We worked every detail out with the writers. But George would have something that he’d done in vaudeville and he’d show me. For instance, in Let George Do It he slides across the scene on the back of his neck — that was part of his vaudeville act. He said, “Can you use it?" and I said, “Of course we can fit it in”. So we had a scene writtenspecially for a comedy sequence - the first time in Australia — and we had a trio that sang in the bar. Wallace got great laughs out of that trio. It really surprised the public when four extras started to sing in an Australian picture with an integrated score... Wallace had tremendous ability as a fall-down dancer; nobody could fall better or easier. Every comic I know worshipped at the throne of Wallace for the way he could fall without hurting himself. This is a very difficult thing to do, you know, although George had little short legs and almost no distance to fall!

The central idea - a man hiring a hitman to kill him then changing his mind - had been used in several other movies.

The male romantic lead was played by Neil Carlton, a Melbourne-born actor who had appeared in films in England. "I've been searching for a juvenile of Carlton's type ever since I have been directing", said Hall during production. "He's handsome, a good actor, and possesses a fine singing voice; stands 6 ft 1 in. in his socks, weighs 14 St., and is a splendid all-round athlete."

Filming commenced on 30 January 1938 and finished on 22 March. During the shooting of a speedboat chase scene on Sydney Harbour, the boat crashed into a racing eight near Double Bay, cutting it in half and injuring three rowers.

There were several musical numbers which demonstrated Wallace's ability to sing and dance. A water ballet, choreographed by Leon Kellaway, brother of Cecil Kellaway, was shot but was mostly cut in the interests of keeping the film at a fast pace.

== Release ==
The movie originally ran for more than 70 minutes but only a cut-down version of 50 minutes seems to survive.

=== Box office ===
Hall later wrote that the two films he made with Wallace "were very substantial hits". Variety wrote "it broke records everywhere."

The famous tenor Richard Tauber saw the movie when touring Australia.

=== UK Release ===
It was released in Britain in 1940 as In the Nick of Time, to avoid confusion with the 1940 George Formby film Let George Do It!.

=== Critical ===
Filmink called the movie "technically impressive (cinematography, sets, etc), and one can appreciate the comedy and the skill of the set pieces, especially the boat chase (which includes location work on Sydney Harbour) and the wrestling sequence between Wallace and Lloyd. Some of the comedy is fascinatingly dark, with Wallace trying to kill himself by purchasing poison and getting Joe Valli to push him in front of a car."
