= Seven Little Australians (1939 film) =

- Film poster
- Directed by: Arthur Greville Collins
- Written by: Patrick V. Ryan
- Based on: novel by Ethel Turner
- Produced by: Arthur Greville Collins; Edward H. O'Brien
- Starring: Charles McCallum; Patricia McDonald
- Cinematography: George D. Malcolm
- Edited by: George Malcolm
- Music by: Nellie Weatherill
- Production company: O.B. Pictures
- Distributed by: Universal Pictures
- Release date: 15 December 1939
- Running time: 63 mins
- Country: Australia
- Language: English

Seven Little Australians is a 1939 Australian film directed by Arthur Greville Collins and starring Charles McCallum and, in her screen debut, an 18-year-old Pat McDonald. It is an adaptation of Ethel Turner's 1894 novel in a contemporary setting.

== Synopsis ==
Seven children live with their tyrannical father, Captain Woolcot, and step mother Esther. The children can never make their father happy. The second oldest girl, Judy, is sent to boarding school.

Judy runs away and falls ill. She is found by her father who allows her to go on holiday in the country to recuperate. The other children come along with her.

Judy is killed by a falling branch. The Captain becomes aware of how he has mistreated his family.

== Cast ==
- Charles McCallum as Captain Woolcot
- Patricia McDonald as Esther
- Sandra Jaques as Meg
- Robert Gray as Pip
- Mary McGowan as Judy
- Janet Gleeson as Nell
- Ronald Rousel as Bunty
- Nancy Gleeson as Baby
- Donald Tall as the General
- Harold Meade as Colonel Bryant
- Nan Taylor as Mrs Bryant
- John Wiltshire as Gillet
- John Fernside as doctor
- Edna Montgomery as Aldith
- Howard Craven as Andrew
- Letty Craydon as Martha
- George Doran as groom
- Nesta Tait as Bridget
- Carl Francis as Fred Hassel
- Connie Martyn as Mary Hassel
- Nellie Lamport as school teacher
- Mary Swan as Marion
- Jean Hart as Betty
- Margaret Roussel as Doris
- Richard Dowse as Major Martin
- Norman Wait as Mr Hill
- Eve Wynne as Mrs Hill

== Production ==
It was originally announced the movie would be made by noted theatre producer Sir Benjamin Fuller, his first exercise in movie making. Fuller said it would be part of a slate of projects, also including the story of Father Damien of Molokai and an adaptation of Norman Lindsay's novel Redheap. Fuller hired English director Arthur Greville Collins, who had directed several Hollywood films arrived in May 1939 to begin preproduction. Collins later said he was visiting Sydney on holiday when he read the book and decided to turn it into a film.

The original plan was to cast one child from each of the six states of Australia, and one from New Zealand. The children who were cast had a variety of experience – Mary McGowan, Ron Rousel and Sandra Jacques had a background in amateur theatre and radio; sisters Janet and Nancy Gleeson were pantomime and radio veterans at the age of seven.

The script updated the story from 1894 to the 1930s. "Although the story has been modernised " said Collins, "we have made every effort to retain the same freshness and vivacity that has made the book such a definite part of Australian fiction."

Despite announcements of Fuller's involvement, the film was eventually produced by O.B. Pictures, a Sydney company headed by businessman Edward O'Brien. They announced plans to make a series of other films with Collins.

Shooting started in August 1939 and took place on location at Camden, the Sydney Glaciarium ice rink, and in the studios of the Commonwealth Film Laboratories in Sydney. It took five weeks in all.

== Reception ==
Critical reaction was generally poor and the film was not a financial success.
