= Frank Harvey (Australian screenwriter) =

Australian screenwriter (1885–1965)

- Born: Harvey Ainsworth Hilton; 22 December 1885; Earls Court, London, England
- Died: 10 October 1965 (aged 79)
- Occupations: Actor, producer, writer
- Parent: John Ainsworth Hilton (father)
- Family: Frank Harvey (son)

Frank Harvey (22 December 1885 – 10 October 1965) was a British-born actor, producer, and writer, best known for his work in Australia.

== Early life ==
Frank Harvey was born Harvey Ainsworth Hilton on 22 December 1885 in Earls Court, London. He was the son of playwright John Ainsworth Hilton (1842–1903), who also wrote under the pen name Frank Harvey, and Elizabeth Hilton. He had three sisters, Maria, Cora, and Caroline.

== Career ==
Harvey studied acting under Sir Herbert Beerbohm Tree and performed Shakespearean roles in the Lyceum Theatre in London. In 1914, he was engaged by J. C. Williamson to play in Australia with Nancye Stewart, and did not return to Britain until 1926.

In 1922 and 1923, he played the leading man in several J & N Tait productions with the Emélie Polini troupe, touring Australia and New Zealand.

When Harvey returned to Britain, after several months he was cast in The Transit of Venus and then had little difficulty finding work. He was praised for his role in Jew Suss. While acting in this role, he had a nervous breakdown and was told to take three months off.

Harvey had two plays produced, The Last Enemy and Cape Forlorn.

=== Return to Australia ===
By 1931, he was back in Melbourne to appear in a series of plays for J. C. Williamson's, including On the Spot and a production of his own Cape Forlorn. Harvey said he preferred working on stage to screen:

An actor on the screen is not an actor at all, but a robot. In the days of the silent films, an actor could have a distinct screen personality; but now that speech has come, all that is ended. After the novelty has worn off, talking films will settle down here, as they have abroad, into a mere substitute for the silent films, and will not interfere in any way with the prosperity of the legitimate theatre. The screen should stick to the sphere in which it is really capable – the sphere of spectacular production, such as Iies outside the ambit of the legitimate stage. It is really a glorified sideshow.

Harvey returned to London in October 1931, but was back in Australia in 1933 to work for F. W. Thring at Efftee Productions as an actor and screenwriter. He adapted the stage play Clara Gibbings for the screen and also helped direct it.

In 1935, he moved to Sydney and began writing and acting for ABC radio. This led to a full-time appointment as senior drama producer in 1944, directing actors such as Queenie Ashton (in early episodes of Blue Hills), Lyndall Barbour and Nigel Lovell. He appeared as Nestor the story-teller in the Argonauts Club for most of the 1940s. His play False Colours was staged by Doris Fitton's Independent Theatre.

In 1936 he founded a school of voice production and dramatic art with Claude Flemming. He also wrote the script for the movie White Death.

=== Cinesound ===
That year Harvey went to work for Ken G. Hall at Cinesound Productions as a studio dialogue director and in-house screenwriter. Starting with It Isn't Done (1937), Harvey wrote or co-wrote nine produced feature film scripts for Cinesound over four years, often playing small roles in them.

Filmink argued in the Cinesound "Harvey typically played rich toffs, but Tall Timbers shows his range and demonstrates just how good an actor he could be."

According to one observer, Harvey's work as an actor and writer showed his bias towards the theatrical: "his scripts tend towards fulsome dialogues with witty repartee and epigram-matical statements, and his acting, particularly in Tall Timbers (1937), tends to exploit dramatic gestures and facial expressions far more intensively than was then required for screen 'naturalism'. Under Hall's direction, Harvey's dialogues were simplified and images allowed to express more of the script's content; his acting too became increasingly restrained as he adjusted to the demands of the film medium."

Filmink argued about Broken Melody "We can tell Frank Harvey had a lot of fun working on the screenplay for this – not only is there a lot of his patented epigrammatical dialogue and showbiz in-jokes, he writes himself a juicy support part where he hams it up and a beautiful girl flings herself at him." The same magazine called Dad and Dave Come to Town his best script.

== Radio ==
In 1941, Harvey signed a contract with ABC to work on radio.

During World War II, Harvey served in the Volunteer Defence Corps until 1944, when he left the army and went under contract to ABC as a radio actor and producer. He eventually became ABC's head of radio drama.

By the time Harvey retired in 1952, he had directed hundreds of radio plays.

== Later career ==
Harvey continued to write. He also published a short lived magazine on theatre in Australia, Theatregoer, that published five Australian plays including A Fox in the Night, The One Day of the Year, The Well, The Multi-Coloured Umbrella, and Pacific Paradise.

== Personal ==
He married Grace Ackerman in 1910 and divorced her in 1923 on grounds of desertion. On 3 April 1924 he married Helen Rosamond "Bobbie" McMillan, an actress with the Emélie Polini troupe and daughter of Sir William McMillan, Minister for Railways in New South Wales, Australia.

A son (1912–1981) by his first marriage, named Frank Harvey, was a British playwright and novelist who wrote the play Saloon Bar and screenplays for British movies, including Seven Days to Noon (1950) and I'm Alright Jack (1960).

He had a daughter, Helen, by his second wife.

== Plays ==
=== As writer ===
- The Last Enemy (1929) (later played by a young Laurence Olivier)
- Cape Forlorn (1930)
- False Colours (1935)
- The Love Story of Anne (1936)
- Murder Tomorrow (1937)

=== As actor ===
- Joseph and His Brethren (1914) w/ Nancye Stewart (her debut)
- The Man Who Stayed at Home (1915 in Australia and New Zealand)
- Within the Law (1915)w/ Muriel Starr
- The Marriage of Kitty (1916) w/ Marie Tempest
- Annabelle (1916) w/ Marie Tempest
- A Pair of Silk Stockings (1917) w/ Marie Tempest and Nancye Stewart
- The Easiest Way (1918) w/ Muriel Starr
- The Silent Witness (1919) w/ Muriel Starr
- Adam and Eva (1921) w/ Maud Hannaford
- Scandal (1922 in New Zealand) w/ Emélie Polini
- My Lady's Dress (1923 in New Zealand) w/ Emélie Polini
- The Flaw (1923 in New Zealand) w/ Emélie Polini
- De Luxe Annie (1923 in New Zealand) w/ Emélie Polini
- The Bird of Paradise (1923) w/ Muriel Starr
- The Garden of Allah (1924) w/ Muriel Starr
- A Royal Divorce (1925) w/ Muriel Starr
- So This Is London (1925) w/ Muriel Starr and Mayne Lynton
- Secrets (1925)
- Within the Law (1925)
- Monsieur Beaucaire (1925) w/ Mary Hinton
- Seventh Heaven (1925) w/ Remy Carpen
- The Silver King (1926) w/ Remy Carpen and Mayne Lynton
- East Lynne (1929) in New Zealand w/ Muriel Starr
- The Transit of Venus – in London
- Jew Suss as the Duke
- Cape Forlorn (1930) in London
- The Calendar (1931) w/ Campbell Copelin and Coral Brown (her debut)
- On the Spot (1931) in Melbourne w/ Campbell Copelin
- Cape Forlorn – start 29 August 1930 – Criterion Theatre, Sydney – w/ Harvey Adams and Charles Wheeler
- My Lady's Dress (1931) playing seven different roles w/ Iris Darbyshire
- The Man with a Load of Mischief (November 1931) – Haymarket, London
- Rope (1932) w/ Campbell Copelin
- Mother of Pearl (1934) starring Alice Delysia and Campbell Copelin, (also written and directed by him)
- Her Past (1934) starring Alice Delysia and Campbell Copelin (also directed)
- Black Limelight (1939) w/ Henry Mollison and Lina Basquette at newly opened Minerva Theatre

== Filmography ==
- Within Our Gates (1915) – director
- Cape Forlorn (1931) – original play, actor
- The Mayor's Nest (1932) actor
- The Love Contract (1932) actor
- Up for the Derby (1933) actor
- The Streets of London (1934) – actor
- A Ticket in Tatts (1934) – actor
- Sheepmates (1934) (abandoned) – actor
- Clara Gibbings (1934) – writer
- Heritage (1935) – actor
- White Death (1936)
- It Isn't Done (1937) cowriter Carl Dudley, actor
- Tall Timbers (1937) – writer, actor
- Lovers and Luggers aka Vengeance of the Deep (1937) – writer, actor
- The Broken Melody aka The Vagabond Violinist (1938) (Note: This movie is notable for appearance of a very young Gough Whitlam.) – writer, actor
- Dad and Dave Come to Town (1938) – writer, actor
- Let George Do It (1938) – writer, actor
- Murder Tomorrow (1938) - original play
- Mr. Chedworth Steps Out (1939) – writer
- Gone to the Dogs (1939) – writer, actor
- Dad Rudd, MP (1940) – writer, actor

=== Unproduced projects ===
- musical version of Robbery Under Arms (1934)
- film version of Collits' Inn (circa 1934)

== Radio credits ==
As actor

- Monsieur Beaucaire (1935)
- Scandal (1935)
- My Lady's Dress (1935)
- Dead or Alive by Edmund Barclay (1936)
- The Fire on the Snow (1941 original production by Frank Clewlow) as Robert Falcon Scott

As director

- Macbeth (1948) with Lloyd Berrell and Lyndall Barbour
- Waterloo Bridge (1948) with Max Osbiston

As actor

- Diary of a Plain Citizen (1940)

== Sources ==
- The Golden Age of Australian Drama Richard Lane, Melbourne University Press 1994 ISBN 0-522-84556-8
- Biography by Stephen Vagg
- Frank Harvey at IMDb
- Frank Harvey Australian theatre credits at AusStage
- Frank Harvey at the National Film and Sound Archive
