= Edward Joseph Tait =

Australian theatrical entrepreneur

- Born: 21 August 1878; Castlemaine, Victoria, Australia
- Died: 12 July 1947 (aged 68); Potts Point, News South Wales, Australia
- Other names: E.J.
- Occupation: Theatre entrepreneur
- Known for: J. C. Williamson Theatre Ltd
- Family: Charles Tait, J. Nevin Tait, John Tait (brothers)

Edward Joseph Tait (21 August 1878 – 12 July 1947), generally known as "E.J.", was an Australian theatrical entrepreneur closely associated with the firm of J. C. Williamson Ltd, and was involved with concerts and theatrical productions for more than 50 years.

== Biography ==
Edward Joseph Tait was born in Castlemaine, Victoria, to John Turnbull Tait, a tailor born in Scalloway, Scotland and his English wife Sarah Leeming, he was educated in Melbourne, and originally worked for a financier. He was next associated with his brother Charles in organising concert attractions; in 1900 he joined "The Firm" of J. C. Williamson Ltd, and became treasurer two years later at Her Majesty's Theatre, Melbourne. He remained with J. C. Williamson's (as general manager from 1913) until 1916, when he joined his brothers John and Nevin, who had from 1907 been bringing concert artists to Australia.

In 1920, the firm of J. and N. Tait joined with the Williamson organisation; E.J., John, and Frank becoming managing directors in association with Sir George Tallis, and J. Nevin Tait, a London director.

He married Anita Jessie Coutie on 26 April 1905; they had three children. Their daughter Jessie Nita Tait (1908–1936) was married to the cartoonist Jimmy Bancks.

He was considered one of the most colourful entrepreneurs in the history of the Australian stage. He had remarkable vitality, and was known to work 20 hours a day for days at a stretch. He would return to his office after working all day and half the night directing rehearsals then do desk work until breakfast. He could be intolerant of associates who had not the same stamina and work ethic. Two months before his death he was in New York, negotiating Australian rights to new plays.

His body was cremated at the Northern Suburbs Crematorium.

E. J. Tait was associated during his long career with many famous artists including John Barrymore, Dame Nellie Melba, Julius Knight (Australian leading man, died March 1941), Maud Jeffries, Robert Brough (Australian actor/comedian died April 1906), Dion Boucicault, Jr., Violet Vanbrugh, Florence Young, Nellie Stewart, Maggie Moore, Tittell Brune, Wilson Barrett, Oscar Asche, Emélie Polini and Lily Brayton.

Stage people gave nicknames to the young Tait brothers: "Hesitate" (E. J. Tait), "Cogitate" (F. S. Tait), "Agitate" (J. H. Tait), and "Irritate" (J. N. Tait)
