= Dad Rudd, M.P. =

- Poster for theatrical release
- Directed by: Ken G. Hall
- Written by: Bert Bailey; Frank Harvey; William Freshman
- Based on: characters created by Steele Rudd
- Produced by: Ken G. Hall
- Starring: Bert Bailey; Grant Taylor; Fred MacDonald
- Cinematography: George Heath
- Edited by: William Shepherd
- Production company: Cinesound Productions
- Distributed by: British Empire Films
- Release dates: 5 June 1940 (world premiere); 14 June 1940 (Sydney)
- Running time: 83 mins
- Country: Australia
- Language: English
- Budget: £18,000 or £23,000
- Box office: £28,000

Dad Rudd, M.P. is a 1940 comedy that was the last of four films made by Ken G. Hall starring Bert Bailey as Dad Rudd. It was the last feature film directed by Hall prior to the war and the last made by Cinesound Productions, Bert Bailey and Frank Harvey.

== Synopsis ==
Dad Rudd wants the size of a local dam increased for the benefit of local farmers but faces opposition from a wealthy grazier, Henry Webster. When the local Member of Parliament dies, Webster runs for his seat, and Rudd decides to oppose him.

Webster and his team use dirty tricks to defeat Rudd, so he calls in his old friend from the city, Entwistle to help. Matters are complicated by the fact that Rudd's daughter Ann falls in love with Webster's son Jim.

On polling day, a fierce storm causes the dam to collapse. A major flood traps workers on the wrong side of the dam and the Rudds and Jim Webster team up to save the day. Dad Rudd is elected to parliament, where he gives a rousing speech.

== Cast ==
- Bert Bailey as Dad Rudd
- Fred MacDonald as Dave Rudd
- Grant Taylor as Jim Webster
- Frank Harvey as Henry Webster
- Connie Martyn as Mum
- Yvonne East as Ann Rudd
- Ossie Wenban as Joe
- Valerie Scanlan as Sally
- Alec Kellaway as Entwistle
- Jean Robertson as Mrs Webster
- Barbara Weeks as Sybil Vane
- Ronald Whelan as Lewis
- Letty Craydon as Mrs McGrury
- Marshall Crosby as Ryan
- Joe Valli as MacTavish
- Field Fisher as Jenkins
- Billy Stewart as Bloggs
- Natalie Raine as Susie
- Lorna Westbrook as Minnie
- Leo Gordon as Fordham
- Chips Rafferty as fireman
- Raymond Longford as electoral officer
- John Sherman as interjector

== Production ==
=== Script ===
The last six films made by Cinesound Productions were all comedies as producer Ken G. Hall sought to ensure guaranteed box office successes. He elected to make another Dad and Dave film instead of two other long-planned projects, an adaptation of Robbery Under Arms and a story about the Overland Telegraph. Hall said in 1939 that:

Though we were entertaining the idea of other types of stories, the amazing enthusiasm for Dad and Dave Come to Town makes another Bailey picture the wisest commercial choice. We feel that, by placing 'Dad' in politics, we will inject any amount of comedy material which is typical of Bailey at his best.

William Freshman was originally reported as having worked on the script and is credited along with Frank Harvey on the script submitted for copyright registration with the National Archives of Australia. However he does not have screen credit. Filmink argued "it feels as though Bailey would have had a pass at the script, and the structure and romantic scenes... feel very “Frank Harvey like” – it’s a stronger screenplay than Freshman’s Come Up Smiling. Comic sequences were most likely composed by Cinesound’s uncredited gag team."

The movie was more serious than others in the series, being basically a drama with comic interludes. Bert Bailey commented during filming that:

In one of the old 'Selection' books, Dad did stand for Parliament. But that was for comedy purposes. In Dad Rudd, M.P., when Dad does come down and speak in Parliament, there is not one tinge of comedy. He is an earnest old chap, speaking in a plain, ordinary, common-sense way on water conservation. He is saying what he believes is the right thing to be done for the farmer, and for the country. For water is a national asset. In this scene, Dad does allude to the war. He says that the spirit which animated the pioneers who crossed the plains and fought the land is the same spirit behind the adventurous boys who go abroad to fight for Australia."

Filmink argued "The movie is quite cynical on the Australian political scene."

Ken Hall himself edited out this speech when the film screened on ABC TV in 1970. "In the light of the world as we know it in the seventies, it all sounded so follow, so phony, so naive", he wrote. But the speech remains in most copies of the film available today.

=== Casting ===
The romantic leads were played by Yvonne East and Grant Taylor, both graduates of the Cinesound Talent School making their first film. Chips Rafferty makes an early screen appearance as a fireman in the Keystone Cops-style opening sequence. Hall says he was looking for someone tall and thin to contrast with the other firemen and Ron Whelan introduced him to Rafferty. Hall later put Rafferty in some reshoots he did for Come Up Smiling, making this Rafferty's first performance.

The cast had more continuity than usual for a Cinesound Rudd film, with Alec Kellaway, Connie Martyn, Ossie Wenban, Valerie Scanlan and Marshall Crosby all reprising their roles from Dad and Dave Come to Town (1938).

American actor Barbara Weeks, who was visiting Australia at the time of shooting with her husband, played a small role at the behest of Ken G. Hall.

=== Shooting ===
During pre production, Cinesound was visited by Adolph Zukor, founder of Paramount Pictures, then touring Australia. He had seen Dad and Dave Come to Town on the boat trip from the US, and been so impressed with the film's quality he wanted to visit the studio.

Shooting took place in February and March 1940, in the Cinesound Studio and on location at Woronora Dam and Camden. Cinesound hired space on the lot of the closed-down Pagewood studios for building a scale reproduction of the dam for the climax. These were supervised by J Alan Kenyon, who did the special effects for most of Cinesound's movies. The fake dam was 125 feet long and held 12,000 gallons of water.

According to Hall:

It was the smoothest, best-made of the Bert Bailey films. In the process of the gradual evolution of the people and the storylines we had set down for these productions, the rawness had gone off the characters. There was much less burlesque of the types. The story was more modern and believable.

The movie was partly financed with a guaranteed overdraft of £15,000 from the New South Wales government.

== Release ==
=== Box office ===
Dad Rudd, M.P. was a hit at the box office, earning £28,000 and achieving a successful release in Britain. However it was generally felt this result was below expectations. Hall thought this was due in part to the fact that it was released "when Britain was standing alone under the blitz and all of Europe was aflame. It was a grim time for the whole world and a disastrous time for the entertainment industry. The theatres in Australia reached their lowest ebb since the depths of the Depression. Some suburban houses went dark and many city houses might just as well have been closed for all the good they were doing."

The drain on material caused by World War II saw Cinesound abandon feature production in June 1940 for the duration of the war. They never made another feature film.

=== Critical ===
Smith's Weekly declared "A good time is had by all; the humor Is richly Australian; class-distinctions are turned upside down in truly heartening style, and the Rudds emerge noisily triumphant. It's a slice of Australian back-block life as discovered by Steele Rudd long years ago; and one must congratulate Cinesound for having copied the American model so cleverly. The closing scenes are ambitious, to say the least of them. The whole effect is generally hopeful for the future of Australian films."

Filmink later wrote that Grant Taylor "had looks, swagger and charm, albeit a hairline that was already receding. He was a man. His performance was well-received and he was launched as an actor."
