= The Silence of Dean Maitland (disambiguation) =

The Silence of Dean Maitland is an 1886 novel by Maxwell Gray.

The Silence of Dean Maitland may also refer to:

- The Silence of Dean Maitland (1914 film)
- The Silence of Dean Maitland (1934 film)
