= Vic Roberts (writer) =

Vic Roberts was an English-born writer who worked in theatre, film and radio. He is best known for writing vaudeville sketches for Roy Rene in the 1920s and 1930s although there is some debate as to the exact extent of his contribution.

He had a background in English musical hall and was hired to work for Rene by Sir Benjamin Fuller. After his initial trip to Australia, Roberts returned to England but then decided to stay in Australia.

Roberts also wrote a number of screenplays for Ken G. Hall in collaboration with George D. Parker, although Hall later said he was dissatisfied with their work.

Roberts moved to Perth in 1953.

== Writings ==
- Cinesound Varieties (1934)
- Strike Me Lucky (1934)
- Grandad Rudd (1935)

== Works cited ==
- Djubal, Clay. "What Oh Tonight: The Methodology Factor and Pre-1930s Australian Variety Theatre." Ph D Diss. The University of Queensland, 2005. Available via Australian Variety Theatre Archive. (Sighted 19 January 2014)
- Hall, Ken G. Directed by Ken G. Hall, Lansdowne Press, 1977.
- "Vic Roberts" at Australian Variety Theatre Archive. (Sighted 19 January 2014)
