= The Silence of Dean Maitland (1934 film) =

- Directed by: Ken G. Hall
- Written by: Gayne Dexter; Edmund Barclay
- Based on: play adapted from the novel by Maxwell Gray
- Produced by: Ken G. Hall
- Starring: John Longden; Jocelyn Howarth; Bill Kerr
- Cinematography: Frank Hurley
- Edited by: William Shepherd
- Music by: Hamilton Webber
- Production company: Cinesound Productions
- Distributed by: British Empire Films (Australia); RKO (England)
- Release dates: May 1934 (Australia); 1935 (UK)
- Running time: 97 mins
- Country: Australia
- Language: English
- Budget: £10,132
- Box office: £33,000 (Aust) £40,000 (UK)

The Silence of Dean Maitland is a 1934 Australian film directed by Ken G. Hall, and based on Maxwell Gray's 1886 novel of the same name. It was one of the most popular Australian films of the 1930s.

== Plot ==
Cyril Maitland is a clergyman living in a small seaside town, who impregnates the beautiful Alma Lee despite being engaged to another woman. When Alma's father Ben finds out about the pregnancy, he attacks Maitland and is killed in a fall. Mailtand's best friend, Doctor Henry Everard, gets the blame, and spends twenty years in jail while Maitland's career thrives.

== Cast ==
- John Longden as Dean Maitland
- Charlotte Francis as Alma Lee
- Jocelyn Howarth as Alma Gray
- John Warwick as Dr Henry Everard
- John Pickard as Tommy Everard
- Bill Kerr as Cyril Maitland Jnr
- Fred MacDonald as Granfer
- George Lloyd as Granfer
- Claude Turton as Charlie Gray
- W. Lane Bayliff as Reverend Maitland Snr
- Les Warton as Ben Lee
- Leal Douglas as Mrs Lee

== Production ==
=== Development ===
The script was based on a play adapted from a popular novel by Maxwell Gray which had previously been filmed in 1914. The rights to the play were owned by a friend of Stuart F. Doyle's, Joe Lippmann. Hall and Doyle went to see a production of the play at the Rockdale Amateur Society and "ended up in a fit of controllable laughter." However Hall recognised that the basic structure of the piece was solid. He arranged for the play to be adapted into a screenplay by ABC radio writer Edmund Barclay and an old friend of Hall's, Gayne Dexter.

=== Casting ===
The film was meant to be Cinesound's follow up to On Our Selection but Hall had trouble finding appropriate actors to play the leads, and so made The Squatter's Daughter instead. Eventually, John Longden and Charlotte Francis, English actors touring Australia in a play, were cast. Jocelyn Howarth, who had leapt to fame in The Squatter's Daughter, was given a support role.

Longden was paid £60 a week, a relatively high fee for Australian films.

=== Shooting ===
The movie was shot on location in Camden and at Cinesound's studios in Bondi. Filming took ten weeks.

== Release ==
=== Censorship troubles ===
Newspaper seller, Sydney, April 1934, with Sun headline 'Dean's kiss passed by censor'

Ken G. Hall ran into trouble with the censor over scenes where Charlotte Francis swims on the beach and later seduces the clergyman. However, Cinesound appealed and these scenes ended up staying in the final film. A brief shot in which Alma's towel slips while she is changing was removed.

=== Box office ===
Released on a double bill with the variety short Cinesound Varieties, the film was highly popular at the local box office and achieved release in England; in fact, Hall says box office receipts were higher in England than in Australia.

By the end of 1934 The Silence of Dean Maitland had earned an estimated £22,000 at the Australian box office and a profit of £4,300; in 1952 Hall claimed the film had earned just under £50,000 in Australia.

The movie was being screened in cinemas as late as 1940.

=== Critical ===
The movie came second place in a 1935 Commonwealth Government Film Competition, winning £1,250. First prize went to Heritage (1935). The judges said the film:

Had well-acted passages of strong drama. The continuity was workmanlike, music was judiciously used, and some of the outdoor scenes were very pleasant. The story was its weakest point, because of the old-fashioned melodrama, bristling with Improbabilities and often over-sentimental.

The intention was for Cinesound to follow this movie with an adaptation of Robbery Under Arms but uncertainty over whether films about bushrangers were still banned led the company to make Strike Me Lucky (1934) instead.

Filmink wrote "At this stage, Hall was still very much in learner director mode, and The Silence of Dean Maitland was technically rough; the pacing is slow, and some of the acting hammy. It’s certainly not as polished as his later movies. However, he was protected by the strength of the story and his cast."
