= Molly Raynor =

New Zealand-born actress (1905–1976)

- Raynor publicity still c. 1930
- Born: Molly Rayner; June 5, 1903; Dunedin, New Zealand
- Died: March 12, 1976 (aged 72); Sydney, Australia
- Education: Sydney Conservatorium of Music
- Occupation: Actress
- Years active: 1921-1976
- Spouse: John Warwick

Molly Raynor (6 May 1903 – 12 March 1976) was a New Zealand–born actress who also worked in the United Kingdom and Australian, known for early film roles in adaptations of Steele Rudd's On Our Selection and Grandad Rudd, and also the films The Hayseeds and Strike Me Lucky.

== Biography ==
Raynor was born Molly Rayner (with an "e") 6 May 1903 in Dunedin, New Zealand, to caricature artist Frederick Richards Rayner, born in Swansea, South Wales, and singer and actress Rhoda Blanche Duckworth.

She left New Zealand as a school girl to study music, elocution and singing at the Sydney Conservatorium of Music.

She married actor and playwright/dramatist John Warwick in 1929. She died in Sydney, Australia, on 12 March 1976.

Shortly after arriving in Sydney, she appeared as one of Mrs. Bennett-White's "Cheer-Oh Girls", a concert party that raised funds for charitable causes relating to soldiers and veterans. She appeared between 1921 and 1927, giving character sketches.

== Filmography ==
- On Our Selection (1932) as Kate
- The Hayseeds (1933) as Pansy Regan (credited as Molly Rayner)
- Strike Me Lucky (1934) as Bates
- Grandad Rudd(1935) as Amelia Banks
- Jennifer Hale (1937) as Constance Hall
- Gaslight uncredited
- We'll Meet Again (1943) as Mrs. Summers
- Woman to Woman (1947) as Sylvia's Friend
- The Pleasure Garden 1947 (TV movie)
- Music Hall (1949) as herself
- Dinner at Eight (1951)
- BBC Sunday Night Theatre (1951) as Carlotta Vance
- Theatre Royal (1952) as Kitty Lemoyne Dean
- Mr Beamish Goes South (1953)
- The Scarlet Web (1954) as Miss Riggs
- Child's Play (1954) as Mrs Cannon
- Armchair Theatre (1964) as Mrs. Jordon
- Number 96 (1972) as Old Lady
- McManus MPB (1976) as Mrs. O'Rourke
