= James C. Bain =

Australian entertainer and entrepreneur

James Cairns Bain (11 January 1870 – 28 May 1946) was an Australian entertainer and entrepreneur, active in vaudeville.

== History ==
Bain was born in Ipswich, Queensland, the eldest son of James Bain and Elizabeth Bain, née McFarlane. Bain was a student at Ipswich Grammar along with two other notable "Jimmies", Bradfield and Blair; Bain was not a notable student but excelled in sports. On leaving school he found employment with the Queensland Railways.

In 1894 he did a guest spot as a comic and singer for Harry Rickards at the Tivoli, Sydney, to good reviews and with the Coghill Brothers and Continental Vaudeville Company in Brisbane.

In 1898 he toured Queensland for Rickards, and took a small troupe of Tivoli performers to Perth, Western Australia, playing June to September at the Cremorne Theatre, Kalgoorlie.

He lived in Tasmania 1903 to 1910, establishing a first-rate variety theatre in both Hobart and Launceston.

In 1910 he established a vaudeville circuit based in the Princess Theatre, Sydney, also playing in the Coliseum (North Sydney), Coronation Theatre (Bondi Junction) and the Acme Theatre (Rockdale). Entertainers included Roy Rene, George Sorlie and Gladys Moncrieff.

Later, Bain and his daughter "Little Verna" worked for the Fullers Vaudeville Company in Australia and New Zealand.

He was employed as an occasional radio comedian by the ABC on 2FC, and broadcast by other stations in the ntwork.

He died suddenly in Brisbane General Hospital on 28 May 1946.

== Family ==
On 30 August 1893 he married Mary Emma Bashford. Their first child, James Bashford Bain, was born in December 1893. James Bashford Bain married Eva Mary Yates in 1918; the newspaper announcement mentioned his mother but not his father.

There is no indication that Mary Emma Bain left Ipswich for Tasmania with her husband. His daughter Verna Bain, born sometime around 1905, was an accomplished dancer at an early age, billed as "Little Verna". In September 1920 Verna Bain was one of the principles with the Tivoli Ballet at Rickards Sydney Tivoli Theatre and she was still with the Ballet in October 1922, and receiving good reviews as late as 1934.

Another daughter, Phyllis Bain, was a singer and pianist, but nothing more has been found.
