= Searchlight on Japan =

- Directed by: Ken G. Hall
- Produced by: Ken G. Hall
- Cinematography: Geoffrey Thompson
- Production company: Cinesound Productions
- Release date: September 1948
- Running time: 20 mins
- Country: Australia
- Language: English

Searchlight on Japan is an Australian documentary about the Allied occupation of Japan after World War II directed by Ken G. Hall. It typically played as a support feature in cinemas.

The film was sold to American television.
