= George D. Parker =

Australian writer and stage producer

George D. Parker (1873-1937) was an Australian actor, writer and director who worked extensively in Australian theatre during the 1920s and 1930s, mostly for J.C. Williamson Ltd. He was later employed by Cinesound Productions as a dialogue director and screenwriter (in collaboration with Vic Roberts), as well as running the Cinesound Talent School with Frank Harvey. According to Hall, "Parker was much more slick in his handling of dialogue" than him around the time of The Silence of Dean Maitland but he did not work with Cinesound after Grandad Rudd.

Parker was working in radio just prior to his death.

== Theatre ==
- *Margery Daw (1916) Princess Theatre, New York – Playwright
- Love Laughs (1919) Bijou Theatre, New York – Playwright
- Journey's End (1930) - director

== Filmography ==
- The Silence of Dean Maitland (1934) – dialogue director
- Strike Me Lucky (1934) – co-writer, dialogue director
- Cinesound Varieties (1934) – co-writer, dialogue director
- Grandad Rudd (1935) – co-writer
