= Music in Our Schools =

1953 film by Ken G. Hall

- Directed by: Ken G. Hall
- Produced by: Ken G. Hall
- Starring: Rosalind Keene
- Production company: Cinesound Productions
- Distributed by: British Empire Films
- Release date: 11 May 1953
- Country: Australia
- Language: English

Music in Our Schools is a 1953 Australian documentary directed by Ken G. Hall. It was made for the Department of Education and looks at the use of music in schools. According to the Sydney Morning Herald the film "resolves itself mainly into a scries of performances by choirs and picked instrumentalists."

The movie was released as a support featurette in cinemas for movies such as A Queen is Crowned.

Reviewing the movie, and another film for the Department of Education, the Sydney Morning Herald said "In matters of filmcraft, neither film seeks to leave plodding commonplace to find vivid and artistic ways ofcommunicaling useful data... Attempts to make individual stories-out of. the general work of, the department are... artificial, clumsy, and sometimes waggish."
