= From Palestine to Bengazi with the Prime Minister =

- Produced by: Ken G. Hall
- Narrated by: Peter Bathurst
- Cinematography: Department of Information Official Unit; Damien Parer
- Production companies: Cinesound Productions; Department of Information
- Release date: February 1941
- Running time: 9 minutes
- Country: Australia
- Language: English

From Palestine to Bengazi with the Prime Minister is a 1941 Australian documentary film produced by Ken G. Hall about the trip to the Middle East in early 1941 by Prime Minister Robert Menzies.
