= Haven on the Hill =

- Produced by: Ken G. Hall
- Production company: Cinesound Productions
- Release date: November 1956
- Country: Australia
- Language: English

Haven on the Hill is a 1956 Australian documentary produced by Ken G. Hall about the War Veterans' Home in Narrabeen.

It was one of Hall's favourite of his later movies.

It screened in some cinemas as a support feature.
