= Thrill of the Surf =

- Directed by: Ken G. Hall
- Produced by: Ken G. Hall
- Narrated by: John Moyes
- Production company: Cinesound Productions
- Release date: 1949
- Running time: 10 minutes
- Country: Australia
- Language: English

Thrill of the Surf is a 1949 Australian short documentary film about surf culture, directed by Ken G. Hall.

It was one of the first Australian films sold to US television.
