= Road to Victory =

Road to Victory may refer to:

- Road to Victory (1941 film), an Australian short documentary
- Road to Victory (1944 film), a short film

== See also ==
- Victory Road (disambiguation)
