= Roy Rene =

Australian actor and comedian

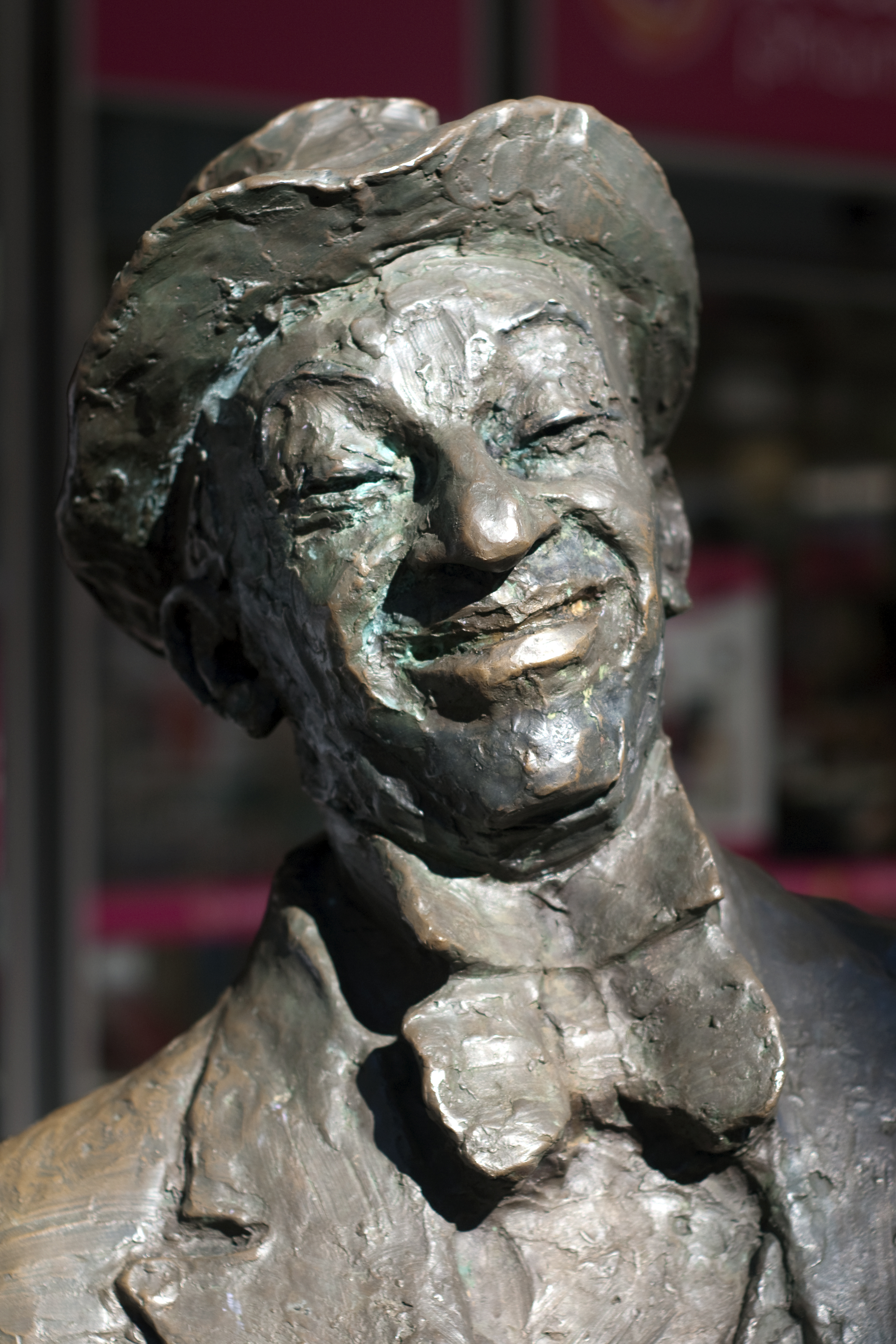
- Bronze statue of Roy Rene in Hindley Street, Adelaide. Created by Robert Hannaford.
- Born: Henry van der Sluys; 15 February 1891; Adelaide, Colony of South Australia
- Died: 22 November 1954 (aged 63); Sydney, New South Wales, Australia
- Occupations: Comedian; vaudevillian; singer; radio performer; actor
- Years active: 1901–1952

Roy Rene (pron. reen; born Henry van der Sluys, 15 February 1891 – 22 November 1954) was an Australian comedian and vaudevillian. As the bawdy character Mo McCackie, Rene was one of the best-known and successful Australian comedians of the early 20th century, and the local answer to Charlie Chaplin.

A 1927 recording of Rene and Nat Phillips performing as Stiffy and Mo, called The Sailors, was added to the National Film and Sound Archive of Australia's Sounds of Australia registry in 2011.

== Biography ==
Born in Adelaide, Colony of South Australia, Rene was the fourth of seven children of Hyam van der Sluys, or Henry Sluice, a Jewish-Dutch cigar maker and his Jewish-English wife Amelia, née Barnett. Named Henry van de Sluice (later spelt variously "van der Sluys"), "Harry" received some education at a Dominican convent, and a Christian Brothers's boarding school in Adelaide; in his words "the nearest he ever got to being a Christian". At aged 10, Harry won a singing competition at an Adelaide market and in 1905 appeared professionally in the pantomime, Sinbad the Sailor, at the Theatre Royal and later at the Tivoli, in a black face, singing and dancing act.

Around 1905, the Sluice family moved to Melbourne; Harry was briefly an apprentice jockey and thereafter maintained a keen interest in racing; his brothers Albert and Lou were prominent bookmakers. Despite his father's opposition, in July 1908, he secured an engagement with James Brennan's vaudeville at the Gaiety Theatre. Of medium height, with dark hair, a pale smooth complexion with large soulful brown eyes and heavy lids, 'Boy Roy' (his stage name) had an appealing pathos. Most of his spare time was spent studying the famous English music-hall comedians at Harry Rickards' New Opera House. Unsuccessful in Melbourne, he appeared at Brennan's National Amphitheatre, Sydney in 1910 and had adopted the new stage name Roy Rene ("Rene" reputedly after a famous French clown, René Rivel perhaps, but stripped of the acute accent). Later he joined J. C. Bain's suburban vaudeville in Sydney and toured New South Wales with bush companies.

While playing at Bain's Princess Theatre, Railway Square, Sydney, in 1914, Rene came to the attention of producer Ben Fuller, who engaged him to tour New Zealand. He developed his unique style and perfected the black beard and chalk-white face make-up (Note: Rene claimed to have copied the style from Will King, an American Jewish comedian, now remembered for the film Weak But Willing, in which Jean Harlow appeared.) which became his trademark. Returning to Sydney in November 1915, he joined Albert Bletsoe's (Note: Albert Bletsoe was the comic and his sister Maud the chanteuse in "The Merry Mascottes", a revue company, who had recently toured America for the Fullers, and purchased some of their latest ideas. The Bletsoes, "English by birth but Australian by adoption" picked up Rene in Melbourne in 1915.) revue company at the Fullers' National Theatre in Sydney.

=== 'Stiffy' and 'Mo' (1916–1925) ===
In July 1916, Rene teamed up with comedian Nat Phillips to form the partnership 'Stiffy and Mo.' The pair made its debut at Sydney's Princess Theatre on 8 July 1916. Phillips had been developing his Stiffy the Rabbitoh character for several years on the Fullers' circuit, where he was engaged as both a comedian and a producer. For the first show, a revusical written by Phillips with the title, What Oh Tonight, (Note: What Oh Tonight was later renamed The Beauty Parlour (among other titles).) he called his off-sider 'Sol'. Rene was not particularly struck with the name, and at the last moment took advice from the Princess Theatre's stage manager, Bill Sadler. The name 'Mo' (Note: Rene's alter-ego did not become 'Mo McCackie' until 1946.) thereafter became his alter-ego. 'Stiffy and Mo' were an instant success. After the Princess Theatre season ended they moved to the Grand Opera House, playing feature parts in the pantomime spectacular The Bunyip, and over the next fifteen years (albeit with an 18-month break) cemented their reputation as one of Australia's greatest larrikin comedy duos.

On 29 March 1917 at St Stephen's Presbyterian Church, Sydney, Henry van der Sluice married actress Dorothy "Dolly" Davis; it was a tempestuous partnership which soon ended in a separation.

Nat Phillips's Tabloid Musical Comedy Company (later known as Nat Phillips's Stiffy and Mo Company) toured the Fullers' Australasian vaudeville circuit continuously until mid-July 1925. Although only half-way through their season at Adelaide's Majestic Theatre, Rene's contract with Fullers' Theatres was due to expire and he chose not to renew it. (Note: The long-held, and often-repeated story that Rene was sacked by Phillips for making vulgar jokes about Adelaide's nude statues, has been identified as a myth by an Australian variety theatre historian, Dr Clay Djubal, and actor Jon Fabian (a longtime friend of Rene's wife and son). Citing evidence from research into the Fullers' theatrical operations, from interviews with Sadie Gale and Sam Van der Sluice, and evidence from Rene himself, as well as an analysis of how the story came to be blindly accepted by historians, they demonstrate that the two key factors in disbanding the Phillips/Rene act were the latter's expiring contract, and their need to have a break after ten exhausting years.) Phillips remained at the Majestic for another two months, initially as solo comedian before elevating Joe Mullaney from the ensemble to temporarily create 'Stiffy and Joe.' Then after briefly trialing 'Oscar the Aussie' and 'Percy the Pom' (with Harry Huley as 'Percy') he eventually settled on Stiffy and 'Erb (Jack Kellaway) in early-1926.

=== 'Give and Take' / 'Bluett and Mo' / 'Stiffy' and 'Mo' (1926–1928) ===
Following his departure from the Stiffy and Mo company Rene went on to appear with outstanding success in a straight play, Give and Take (starring opposite American comedian Harry Green). The play had seasons in both Melbourne and Sydney. In May 1926 Rene made his Tivoli circuit debut in partnership with Fred Bluett (as Bluett and Mo). They initially played seasons in Sydney and Melbourne, before undertaking a national tour, which included Brisbane and Adelaide. Their act comprised at least two sketches - the most popular being 'The Admiral and the Sailor' (aka Fun on the High Sea), which had Mo as the admiral and Bluett as a "jolly tar" who resents the commands of his superior. The other sketch was called 'Oxford Bags'.

In late-January 1927 Rene re-signed with Fullers' Theatres (for one year) and the following month joined his former partner in Brisbane. Phillips was at that time playing a season the Empire Theatre with his Whirligigs Company (featuring Stiffy and 'Erb). For the remainder of the season Brisbane audiences therefore saw a trio called Stiffy, Mo and 'Erb. When the company opened at the Fullers' Theatre, Sydney, in mid-March, however, it featured only Stiffy and Mo. Once again 'Stiffy and Mo' broke box-office records wherever they appeared, including a tour of New Zealand. A number of historians have recorded the New Zealand tour as Stiffy and Mo's last time together on stage, but research undertaken in the early-2000s has revealed that the pair actually played their final season together at Fullers' Theatre, Sydney between 1 and 7 December 1928. The following night Rene opened at the same theatre with his own company, Mo and his Merrymakers. Nat Phillips travelled to Melbourne, opening at the Bijou Theatre on 10 December with a re-formed Whirligigs (featuring 'Stiffy and 'Erb').

== Merrymakers / Strike Me Lucky / Tivoli Years (1929–1945) ==
In April 1929 Rene accepted an engagement from Clay's Bridge Theatre Company to tour its Sydney circuit. He fell in love with Sadie Gale, a well-known singer with the Merrymakers who had appeared with Charles Heslop in musical comedy, and whose father, Sam Gale, was a seasoned performer. First he had to convince her and her parents that he was a suitable match when they disliked him intensely, then divorce his wife, who demanded substantial alimony. They divorced in May 1929 then on 3 July Rene and Barnett married in a Presbyterian church.

He and Sadie Gale married in Sydney on 3 July that same year. Barely a month later the couple took a re-formed Merrymakers troupe through Northern New South Wales and regional Queensland for Clay's.

After the conclusion of the Queensland tour, Rene and Gale travelled to Melbourne to appear in Frank Neil's production of Clowns in Clover at the King's Theatre. Three weeks after the start of the King's Theatre season, the couple joined other cast members in presenting matinee productions of Mother Goose, while also appearing in Clowns in Clover at night. While performing on 7 January 1930 Rene collapsed from peritonitis. Somewhat surprisingly, the symptoms had first started to manifest towards the end of the Queensland tour, but once back in Melbourne Rene had been too busy to seek medical help. He was immediately rushed to hospital where he almost died. Following his operation he remained in hospital until 15 April.

Rene returned to the theatre in mid-1930 for H. D. McIntosh in a revue, Pot Luck, at the Tivoli, Melbourne, but business was bad because of the Great Depression. Rene and Sadie resorted to a tour of Hoyts' suburban theatres in Sydney, followed by a brief vaudeville season in New Zealand, but the Fullers were disbanding their revue companies. In April 1931 Rene joined Connors and his wife Queenie Paul, who had successfully opened low-priced, weekly-change variety at the New Haymarket Theatre, Sydney. By 1932 the Connors had taken over the Melbourne Tivoli and converted the old Sydney Opera House to the new Tivoli, where Rene and Jim Gerald continued to appear after the Connors sold out in mid-1933.

In 1934 he made his only film, Strike Me Lucky, for Ken G. Hall at Cinesound. Film was not his medium, however, as rapport with a live audience was essential to his comedy, and this is partly reflected in its poor acceptance by critics and lower than expected box-office return. Ken G. Hall's direction has also been criticised. Strike Me Lucky's storyline centres on the friendship between Mo McIsaac, who is broke and behind in his rent, and Miriam, a young girl who claims to be an orphan, but who is in fact the runaway daughter of a rich aristocrat. The title is in reference to one of Rene’s vaudeville catch-phrases.

Early the next year, Rene played in Ernest C. Rolls's lavish revue, Rhapsodies of 1935, at the Apollo Theatre, Melbourne. In 1935–36, in partnership with Connors and Paul, he appeared in variety in Sydney and Melbourne, then returned to the Tivoli at the instigation of English producer Wallace Parnell. By early 1939 Rene was in conflict with Frank Neil, general manager of the Tivoli, who terminated his contract: on Neil's death in January 1941, Parnell immediately reinstated him. Throughout World War II Rene played to packed houses, but his contract was not renewed in 1945.

=== Radio star ===
Turning to radio in 1946, Rene signed a contract with Colgate-Palmolive Pty Ltd to appear in program Calling the Stars with a live audience at the 2GB theatrette in Sydney; his much-acclaimed "McCackie Mansion" segment was a highlight. Living at 13 Coffin Street, "Mo" was the suburban householder whose life was made miserable by relatives, neighbours and friends. The popular Yiddish refrain "Khosn kale mazel tov" was his theme tune in "McCackie Mansion". He later appeared in Cavalcade with Jack Davey, and as Professor McCackie in It Pays to be Ignorant.

Rene briefly returned to the stage in 1949 in the revue, McCackie Moments, at the Kings in Melbourne. By the time his radio contract expired in 1950 he was plagued by ill health, but he appeared once in McCackie Manor for the Australian Broadcasting Commission in 1951 and, in 1952, starred in The New Atlantic Show, again capturing a nationwide audience. Filmink argued that Rene's success in radio proved he was adaptable to other mediums and if he had made a second movie it might have been more successful.

Rene died of atherosclerotic heart disease at his home at Kensington, New South Wales, on 22 November 1954, and was buried in the Jewish section of Rookwood Cemetery. He was survived by his wife, son and daughter.

Although largely unknown overseas, "Mo" was hailed by visiting celebrities, such as Dame Sybil Thorndike and Jack Benny, as a comic genius in the company of Charlie Chaplin. Lecherous, leering and ribald, he epitomized the Australian "lair", always trying to "make a quid" or to "knock off a sheila", yet some of his funniest moments were when he was being "posh", as in his outrageous parody, with Sadie, of Noël Coward's Private Lives.

He was a Freemason.

== Legacy and influence ==
In 1948, artist Harold Thornton painted Rene's portrait, which was a finalist in the Archibald Prize.

The memory of Rene lives on in the Mo Awards, presented annually for excellence in live performance. The statuette presented to the recipients is in the form of Rene in his Mo McCackie persona.

Garry McDonald played Roy Rene/Mo in the 1977 theatre production Young Mo, written by Steve J. Spears, and on television in the 1980s.

== See also ==
- George Wallace (Australian comedian)

== Sources ==
- Parsons, Fred. A Man Called Mo. Melb: Heinemann, 1973.
- Rene, Roy. Mo's Memoirs. (ghostwritten by Elizabeth Lambert and Max Harris) Melb: Reed and Harris, 1945.
