= The Silence of Dean Maitland (1914 film) =

- Directed by: Raymond Longford
- Written by: Raymond Longford; Lewis Scott
- Based on: the novel by Maxwell Gray
- Starring: Harry Thomas; Arthur Shirley
- Cinematography: Tasman Higgins
- Edited by: Tasman Higgins
- Production company: Fraser Film Release and Photographic Company
- Release date: 13 June 1914
- Running time: 3,800 feet
- Country: Australia
- Languages: Silent film; English intertitles
- Budget: £400
- Box office: £5,000

The Silence of Dean Maitland is a 1914 Australian silent film directed by Raymond Longford. It is an adaptation of the 1886 novel of the same name by Maxwell Gray which was later filmed by Ken G. Hall in 1934. It is considered a lost film.

== Plot ==
The Reverend Dean Maitland falls for Alma Lee and impregnates her, despite being engaged to another woman. Alma's father attacks Maitland and Maitland accidentally kills him in the struggle. His best friend, Dr Henry Everard is convicted of the crime and sentenced to twenty years in gaol. When Everard is released he comes to Maitland's church. The Dean confesses his guilt publicly and collapses and dies.

== Cast ==
- Harry Thomas as Dean Maitland
- Gwil Adams as Lilian, Cyril's sister
- Nellie Brooks as Alma Lee
- Ada Clyde as Mrs. Lee
- Jack Goodall
- Rebe Grey as Marion Maitland
- Charles Keegan as Cyrill
- Nellie Kemberman as Cyril's mother
- Lottie Lyell as Marion Everhard
- James Martin as Ben Lee
- Arthur Shirley as Doctor Henry Everard
- Little Tuppeny Ellen Blood as Everard Maitland
- Charles Villiers as Judkins

== Production ==
The movie was based on a play adaptation of the novel which had last appeared in Sydney in the 1890s. Longford signed a two-year contract with Fraser Film Company to write films from May 1914 at £1,000 a year. This adaptation of The Silence of Dean Maitland was the first script Longford submitted.

Entirely set in England, the film was shot on location in the grounds of Gladesville Mental Asylum in Sydney. According to The Bulletin, "despite the fact that Longford had no proper studio to work in (as a matter of fact, he had nothing more convenient than a backyard), it was completed in 21 days." Raymond Longford later alleged that "the Combine" refused to let him film in their Rushcutters Bay Studio.

Harry Thomas, who played the leading role, was a noted elocutionist.

The movie was reportedly one of the first to feature the close-up shot. However this is not true.

== Release ==
Colin Fraser secured the Palace Theatre in Sydney for the film's release. However the Combine threatened to cancel its supply of further films to the theatre, and other theatres, if they showed the film. Longford sued for restraint of trade and lost.

Despite this the film was a considerable success at the box office. It also enjoyed a popular release in the UK.

The film was successfully previewed. One person recalled, "The picture finished to tremendous applause, and from that minute it was a great success. When we got down to the Pitt Street offices many exhibitors were there before us eager to book this winner."

In 1918 Archie Fraser claimed the movie was the most successful Australian film to date at the box office.

In 1925 Everyones called it "the first long-run production, having enjoyed a popularity expressed in years and not months... even to-day it is always assured of a profitable season wherever shown, even though the technique of production and photography have made vast strides in the interim. It was he who built the first motion picture studio in Australia."

=== Critical ===
The critic from The Sydney Morning Herald said that "the picture is well taken and the various roles are cleverly portrayed."

The Daily News said "the photographic and histrionic qualities of the production are excellent, the producer having not only kept closely to the text of the novel, but carefully selected his artists with a view to preserving the facial characteristics of the dramatis personae."

Variety said "There Is some good scenic photography, but the acting is a trifle "cheap." Henry Thomas.. could not refrain from looking Into the "eyes" of the camera at all times. The principal criticism Is the lack of growth of the Dean's children covering a long period of years. They never ceased to be children as the years passed."

== Legal dispute ==
Fraser elected to pull out of the contract with Longford at the suggestion of exhibitor Henry Gee of Australasian Films. Longford tried to sue Gee for £1,000 for helping procure breach of contract but was not successful. He appealed the decision, but the court found against him again. The battle hurt Longford's career for a time – he made two short films, then had to leave for New Zealand to get finance.
