= Anzacs in Overalls =

- Directed by: Ken G. Hall
- Written by: Tom Gurr
- Produced by: Ken G. Hall
- Cinematography: Bert Nicholas
- Edited by: William Shepherd
- Production companies: Cinesound Productions; Department of Information
- Release date: 1941
- Running time: 25 minutes
- Country: Australia
- Language: English

Anzacs in Overalls is a 1941 Australian documentary film directed by Ken G. Hall.

According to the National Film and Sound Archive it is:

A propaganda and morale boosting production from WW2 that looks at the way the industrial and agricultural sectors of Australia helped the war effort. It emphasizes and encourages, through a narrator, the efforts put into production for the war effort by the Australian people through sacrifice, ingenuity, etc. It parallels production scenes with scenes of the items being used in war. There are scenes from: factories/foudaries; aircraft production; engine production; an Australian designed tank; gun and artillery production; production of the Owen gun; Universal carrier and other vehicle production; ship building; munitions production; and agricultural and food production.
