= Charlotte Francis =

English actress

Charlotte Francis (birth name Charlotte Frances Jiggens born 12 September 1904 in Lambeth) was an English actress best known for playing the lead role in the Australian film The Silence of Dean Maitland (1934) in which she appeared opposite her husband John Longden. She was touring Australia in a company led by Athene Seyler and Nicholas Hannen for J.C. Williamsons in 1933 when cast in the role. She also had extensive stage credits. Her British stage name was Jean Jay.

== Marriage ==
In 1948 she married journalist and Liberal politician John Hope. She later became a playwright and wrote Western Wind (1949), which was performed at London's Theatre Royal, E15 and Piccadilly theatres. The play had premiered in Glasgow, starring Australian actor, John McCallum and also had a run in Melbourne, Australia.

== Death ==
Frances died in London on 8 February 1983.

== Filmography ==
As actress:

- Ordeal by Golf (1924) Millicent Boyd
- The Only Way (1926) Jeanne Defarge
- Every Mother's Son (1926) Janet Shaw
- Afterwards (1928) Hilda Ryder
- The Silver King (1929) Nellie Denver
- The Third Eye (1929) Flash Annie
- The Silence of Dean Maitland (1934) Alma Lee

As writer:

- Palais de Danse (1929) story, adapted by John Longden
- The School for Scandal (1931) script adapted from Richard Brinsley Sheridan's play
- Come into my Parlour (1932) script co-written with John Longden

== Select theatre credits ==
- Private Lives (1933)
