= Strike Me Lucky =

- Theatrical poster
- Directed by: Ken G. Hall
- Written by: Vic Roberts; George D. Parker
- Produced by: Ken G. Hall
- Starring: Roy Rene; Yvonne Banvard
- Cinematography: Frank Hurley
- Edited by: William Shepherd
- Music by: Hamilton Webber
- Production company: Cinesound Productions
- Distributed by: British Empire Films (Australia); Universal Pictures (UK)
- Release date: 16 November 1934 (Australia)
- Running time: 87 mins
- Country: Australia
- Language: English
- Budget: £9,000 or £16,000

Strike Me Lucky is a 1934 Australian comedy musical film starring popular stage comic vaudevillian Roy Rene in his first and only film. It was the fourth feature film from Cinesound Productions but proved a box office disappointment. Director Ken G. Hall claimed it was the only one of his features not to go into profit within a few years of release, although the film eventually covered costs.

== Synopsis ==
'Mo' McIsaac and his sidekick Donald try to find work to support Miriam, a young orphan girl he finds dancing for pennies in the street; McIsaac is unaware that Miriam is really the missing daughter of rich aristocrat, Major Burnett. Gangster Al Baloney and Mae West impersonator Kate kidnap the girl and Mo is blamed for her disappearance.

Mo and Donald take off into the bush looking for a gold mine (this storyline was inspired by the 1930 expedition to find Lasseter's Reef). Here they are attacked by a tribe of Aboriginal cannibals before discovering their names are cleared. Another plot involves a young couple, Margot Burnett and Larry McCormack, finding love, and dancers perform periodically.

== Cast ==
- Roy Rene as 'Mo' McIsaac
- Alex McKinnon as Donald
- 'Baby' Pamela Bevan as Miriam
- Eric Masters as Al Baloney
- Yvonne Banvard as Kate
- John D'Arcy as Larry McCormack
- Lorraine Smith as Margot Burnett
- Dan Agar as Major Burnett
- Molly Raynor as Bates
- Bert Le Blanc as Lowenstein
- Les Warton as Bull
- Harry Burgess as Mike
- Fred Kelly as castaway
- Marie D'Alton as Mrs Huckleberry
- Arthur Dodds
- Charles Wheeler
- Jack O'Malley
- Charles Keegan
- Nellie Small
- Eva Sheedy

== Production ==
=== Development ===
In the early 1930s, Roy Rene was one of the most popular stage comics in Australia. Bert Bailey and George Wallace had managed to transfer their on-stage popularity to the screen in a series of films, so Ken G. Hall thought he would try to do the same for Rene. Hall later wrote:

The luck we'd had with our first three films all hitting the jackpot was phenomenal. The odds against getting a second winner after The Selection were high in those still-tough times; but to bring in the third filled our cups to overflowing – and scared us a bit at the same time. That sort of luck just could not last. It didn't.

Hall later said "Roy Rene had been hailed by the press, by journalists — let me stress that — as being the top comedian. Possibly because he was as blue as he was and they could retell his jokes... I am not decrying Roy Rene, the great Mo. He was a very funny man, wonderfully talented. But he wasn’t a “family comic”. You didn’t take the kids."

The movie would be Cinesound's fourth feature film. Hall originally intended to make Robbery Under Arms but was concerned about filming it during winter and so postponed the project, electing to make the Rene film instead. (Robbery Under Arms was not made by Hall.)

The original title of Strike Me Lucky was Swastikas for Luck; it was described as "a musical farce with a semi-serious background". It was to "feature many phases of suburban and bush life in Australia".

=== Script ===
The film was the Cinesound Production not based on a play adapted from a novel, being an entirely original story. Hall later said he was "desperately short of writers, especially comedy writers" so he assigned the team of Vic Roberts and George D. Parker, who had just written Cinesound Varieties for Hall; Roberts had worked as Rene's gag writer and Parker had theatrical experience. Roberts also wrote some lyrics for songs used in the movie, while Parker doubled as dialogue director.

Hall admitted there were three different scripts. He later reflected:

The Parker-Roberts combination did not do well on the Varieties script and I should have made changes for the much more important Strike Me Lucky film. The script was full of ridiculous situations which we all thought would suit Mo. I had then, and I'm afraid still have, a highly developed sense of the ridiculous. Maybe too highly developed because that brand of humour does not appeal to everyone, although it worked so well with George Wallace.

Filmink called it a "grab bag... which is more like a musical revue – a series of sketches with a very loose story and musical numbers."

=== Casting ===
Cast member 'Baby' Pamela Bevan was only five years old and was advertised as "Australia's Shirley Temple". The female ingenue part was played by 18-year-old Lorraine Smith, who came from an acting family and had experience in amateur theatre.

=== Shooting ===
Cinesound almost doubled the size of its studio to make the film, and also in anticipation for what was believed would be a boost in production following the introduction of a film quota.

Shooting took place in June and July 1934, going for seven weeks. Over a hundred extras were used in some scenes, a record for Australian interiors. The musical numbers were overseen by Hamilton Webber, musical director of the State Theatre, Sydney; the ballets were choreographed by Richard White.

Rene was paid £70 a week for his performance, which was high for an Australian actor in films, third only to Bert Bailey and George Wallace. He later admitted he did not enjoy acting on film as he missed the stimulation of a live performance and disliked the repetition.

On 18 August, scenes from the film were broadcast nationally as part of a promotion.

== Reception ==
The movie's world premiere was held in October 1934 coinciding with the opening of the extension of Cinesound's Studios at Waverly. NSW Premier Bertram Stevens was present.

The film was refused registration under the quality clause of the New South Wales quota act, but still found release through Cinesound's associated company, British Empire Films.

=== Critical ===
Reviews were not strong. The critic from The Sydney Morning Herald stated that:

One must, in fairness, record the fact that...[the] audience... seemed to enjoy the film immensely. Every new exploit by "Mo" created a running fire of laughter.... [But] He is a good deal less funny than before. On the stage he gained most of his effects through a partly extempore style. He would play straight at the audience, and wait patiently, wearing his inimitably grotesque expression, until each roar of mirth had died away. But... the cinema audience and the figure photographed on celluloid exist in different worlds. Picture-goers can scream their heads off, yet the film sweeps onward heedless and detached. That is why the antics of "Mo" now seem rather artificial, not to say forced. An experienced director of Hollywood farce could perhaps have reshaped the comedian's style to fit the new medium; but Mr. Ken Hall has made only an amateurish job of things... all the actors have the air of novices in a suburban repertory show. As for the plot and the dialogue, one had best relapse into a resigned silence.... Brings in kangaroos and emus and incredible burlesque aborigines for the mere sake of showing them. A good deal of American influence comes in, too. For no discoverable reason Miss Yvonne Banvard goes through her part in exact and avowed impersonation of Mae West. The gangsters all talk American slang.

=== Box office ===
The film was not a success at the box office, despite a strong reception at first, particularly in Sydney and Melbourne. (It earned £1,817 in its first four days at the Sydney Capitol.) Director Ken G. Hall claims it was the only one of his films not to go straight into profit, blaming the poor script and Roy Rene's awkwardness in front of the camera as opposed to a live audience:

Rene himself was in some trouble right from the beginning. In a film studio with no audience, he was something of a fish out of water. No performer I've ever known had the ability to 'work' an audience as Mo could. He'd come on centre stage with no support and just leer at the audience without saying a word for minutes on end and have them rocking with laughter. And when the laughs began to die, he'd lisp in his inimitable way a completely trite line like, 'Will you be quiet, pleath!' – and that would send them off for minutes more. An established comic, a really funny man to the audience, can get laughs by appearing to do nothing at all. Actually he is 'working' all the time – with a look, a raised eyebrow, a sly, suggestive wink, a haughty smile. Mo was a past-master of all that, and much more of course. But he did need an audience. In rehearsal of a funny scene the crew would laugh the first time they saw and heard it. But on the next rehearsal and the next and the next ... nothing. It depressed Mo tremendously. I had seen him rehearsing in the theatre a few times and he just casually walked through, usually waiting for the matinee with a live audience to get the feel of what he was doing. There were some very funny scenes in Strike Me Lucky, but we did not get the best out of Mo overall, mainly because the material was not there – and he was rather at sea himself. This problem characterised many prominent vaudeville comedians transferring to film or television ...

He also felt that Rene was too adult in his humor. "He was a very funny man, wonderfully talented", said Hall later. "But he wasn't a 'family' comic. You didn't take the kids."

=== UK release ===
A shortened version was released in England but attracted little attention.

=== Legacy ===
Although Rene had a contract with Cinesound for further films he did not make any more films. However he did manage to modify his performance style to enjoy considerable success on radio. Filmink argued "could a more experienced Ken Hall made a second, better Roy Rene movie in the late 1930s? We think so – after all, Rene later proved with his radio success that he was capable of adapting to entirely new mediums. Presumably, the trauma of Strike Me Lucky’s failure was too much for Hall or Rene to seriously consider it."

The box office disappointment of the film prompted Hall to return to more sure-fire material for his next film with Grandad Rudd (1935).

== Notes ==
- Hall, Ken G. Directed by Ken G. Hall, Lansdowne Press 1977
