= The Kurnell Story =

- Directed by: Ken G. Hall
- Produced by: Ken G. Hall
- Cinematography: Lloyd Shiels
- Production company: Cinesound Productions
- Release date: 1957
- Running time: 25 mins
- Country: Australia
- Language: English

The Kurnell Story is a 1957 industrial film directed by Ken G. Hall about the construction of the Kurnell Oil Refinery in Sydney, Australia. It was Hall's last movie.
