= Overland Adventure =

- Directed by: Ken G. Hall
- Produced by: Ken G. Hall
- Starring: Jack Murray
- Production company: Cinesound Productions
- Release date: September 1954
- Running time: 46 mins
- Country: Australia
- Language: English

Overland Adventure: The Story of the 1954 Redex Reliability Trial is a 1954 documentary directed by Ken G. Hall about the 1954 Redex Reliability Trial.

It appears to have also been known as Tough Assignment.
