= Can John Braund Cure Cancer? =

- Directed by: Ken G. Hall
- Produced by: Ken G. Hall
- Cinematography: Ron Horner
- Production company: Cinesound Productions
- Distributed by: Warners-Pathe (US)
- Release date: 1948
- Running time: 12 minutes
- Country: Australia
- Language: English

Can John Braund Cure Cancer? is a 1948 Australian documentary directed by Ken G. Hall about John Braund, a man who claimed he could cure cancer.

Braund was a highly controversial character at the time and the film was much publicised. There was considerable controversy over whether Braund should have been allowed to have such a public forum. Braund was later declared to be a fraud.
