= Lionel Lunn =

Australian radio personality

Lionel Lunn (1902–1977) was a leading Australian radio personality of the 1930s and 1940s. He narrated a large number of Australian documentaries during this period. In the 1920s he worked as an actor.

He ran station 2UE for a number of years before being fired.

His name was linked with a number of high-profile divorce cases.

== Select filmography ==
- Sunshine Sally (1922) – actor
- experimental travel films (1931) – narration
- Thar She Blows! (1931) – narration
- That's Cricket (1931) – narration

== Select theatre credits ==
- The Limit (1923) (with Kate Howarde)
- The Green Goddess (1925)
