= Ghosts of Port Arthur =

1933 film

- Directed by: Ken G. Hall
- Produced by: Ken G. Hall
- Narrated by: Bert Bailey
- Cinematography: Frank Hurley
- Production company: Cinesound Productions
- Release date: March 1933
- Running time: 10 mins
- Country: Australia
- Language: English

Ghosts of Port Arthur is a 1933 Australian short documentary directed by Ken G. Hall. It was described as a "travel fantasy" which focuses on the history of the penal settlement at Port Arthur.

It includes sections on New Norfolk, Hobart, Port Arthur, the Hobart Zoo and the River Derwent district.

== Reception ==
The film was released as a support item. The Adelaide News called it a "fine travel talk".
