= Every Mother's Son (1926 film) =

1926 film

Every Mother's Son is a 1926 British drama film directed by Robert Cullen and starring Rex Davis, Moore Marriott and Frederick Cooper.

== Cast ==
- Rex Davis - David Brent
- Frederick Cooper - Tony Browning
- Jean Jay - Janet Shaw
- Moore Marriott - Nobby
- Alf Goddard - Bully
- Haddon Mason - Jonathan Brent
- Gladys Hamer - Minnie
- Johnny Butt - Tricky
- Hubert Harben - Sir Alfred Browning
- Leal Douglas - Lady Browning
