= George Sorlie =

English-born Australian theatrical entrepreneur

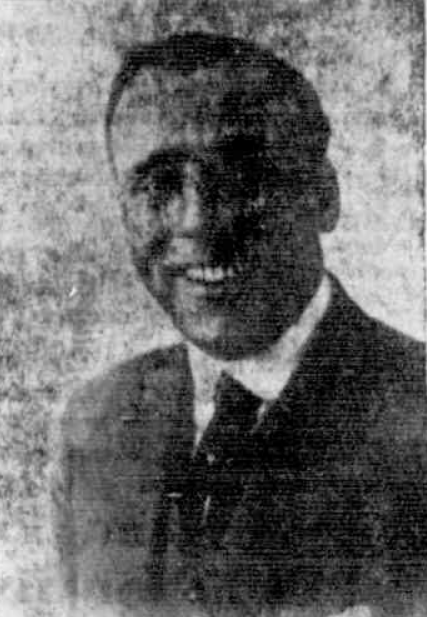
- Sorlie (pictured in 1926)
- Born: George Brown Sorlie; 7 February 1885; Liverpool, England, United Kingdom
- Died: June 1948 (aged 63); Sydney, New South Wales, Australia
- Occupations: Theatre impresario; actor; vaudevillian; singer

George Brown Sorlie (7 February 1885 – 19 June 1948) was an English-born theatrical impresario, actor, vaudevillian performer and singer in Australia, known as "The King of the Road" and "The Shah".

He took his tent shows, a mixture of pantomime, musical comedy and vaudeville around the country. He had a fine baritone voice, and was a popular recording artist.

== Biography ==
Sorlie was born in Liverpool, England, to Sarah Jane Sorlie, née Rodick, and Frederick Sorlie, who emigrated to Australia some time around 1890. After his father's death in 1894, Sorlie and his mother left for Western Australia to live with relatives, first in Perth, then in Kalgoorlie. Frequently taken for American, and described as "a half-caste Negro" (his grandfather was Jamaican), he was known for his fine juvenile soprano voice. He was early engaged in selling newspapers, meanwhile gaining fame as a singer and baton-twirler.

He left for Sydney, where he ran a fruit kiosk by day at the corner of Castlereagh and King streets, appearing at the Princess Theatre, at night. He was employed in Harry Rickards's troupe, where his versatility made him an invaluable performer. He joined the Australian Vaudeville Artists' Federation, of which organisation he was in 1912 elected president. His term as president, which ended in 1916, was marked by a change to support for managers rather than confrontation.

In 1907 he travelled to Adelaide in a company led by Denis Carney and George Bentley, playing at the Tivoli, where he was a "howling success" and gained a reputation as an "end man".

In 1915 he married Grace Florence Stewart (died 21 December 1962), an actress, They had a daughter, Marie Sorlie, who married one Phillips of Curl Curl.

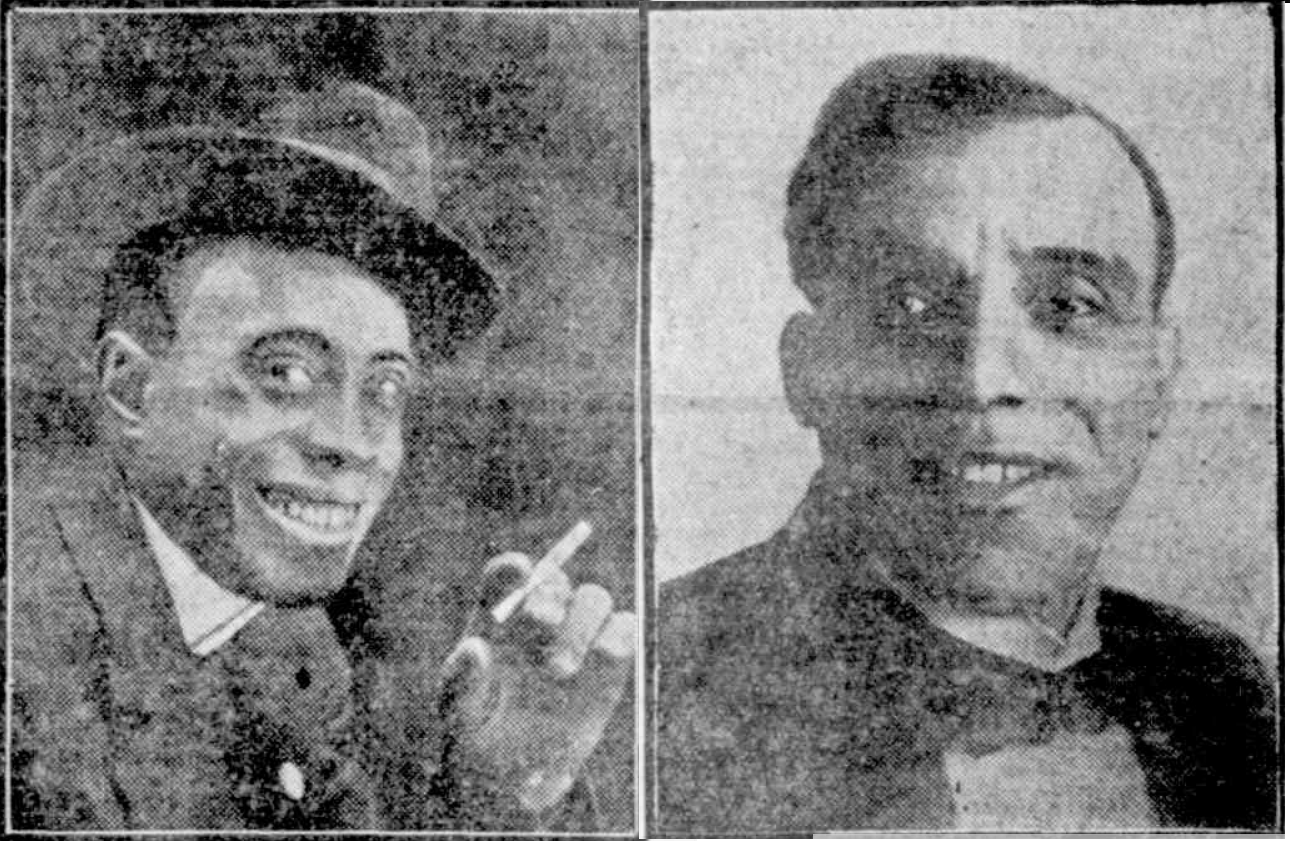
Brown and Sorlie 1916

He became famous in tandem with the comedian Billy Brown as "Brown and Sorlie" 1915–1916

In 1917 he joined Philip Lytton's tent theatre, playing Uncle Tom in the play Uncle Tom's Cabin, the length of the circuit throughout country New South Wales and Queensland, notably playing at Wagga Wagga and Bathurst. The company became the Phillip Lytton and George Sorlie Musical and Dramatic Company in 1921 and the George Sorlie Dramatic Company later that year, but the tent theatre remained Lytton's.

Sorlie began touring his own Canvas Theatre in 1922, independent of Lytton. A visit to any town by the tent theatre was greeted much like a circus, accentuated by Sorlie's own motor car, a Hupmobile distinctively painted with stripes.

He introduced the Māori tenor Noho Toki to Australia.

Recordings for Parlophone

Overseas tour 1928

My Pal, Ginger

Threats of boycott by Harold Lashwod

In later years he invested in real estate, creating the "Village of Sorlie" in Frenchs Forest, but built fewer than twelve homes.

He died at his home, 10 St James Flats, Stanley St., Sydney, on 19 June 1948, and his remains were cremated. Mourners included Sir Benjamin Fuller, Mons. Rex (who was on the stage for 45 years), and Bert Bailey.

With the death of her husband, Mrs Sorlie retired briefly, but in 1950, nicknamed "The Colonel", she resumed managing tent shows in partnership with comedian Bobby Le Brun (1910–1985).

Show business personalities who got their start in Sorlie's "tent shows" include Peter Finch, Fifi Banvard, John Warwick, and Marjorie Lou, who married Wallace Parnell.

== Discography ==
By April 1931 Parlophone had published 21 ten-inch recordings (42 songs) by Sorlie. It is likely Beryl Newell was accompanist for most of these recordings, though only a few have been noted.

- A 2580 'Just Like a Melody From Out of the Sky' (Donaldson), 'Everything is Rosy Down in Georgia' (Johnson). Parlophone 2580
- A 2600 'Angela' 'That Old-Fashioned Locket'
- A 2601 'Beautiful' (Shay), Get Out and Get Under the Moon'(Tobias) A2001
- A 2623 'Girl of My Dreams', 'Ten Little Miles from Town'
- A 2624 'Down on Bullfrogs' Isle', 'Every Time My Sweetie Passes By'
- A 2625 'Tired Hands', 'While You're Away'
- A 2626 'If You Only Had My Disposition', 'I Just Roll Along, Having My Ups and Downs'
- A 2714 'That's What I Think About You, Sweetheart', 'Me and the Man in the Moon'
- A 2715 'Sonny Boy', There's a Rainbow Round My Shoulder"
- A 2740 'Where the Shy Little Violets Grow', 'Way Down South in Heaven'
- A 2626 'I Just Roll Along Having My Ups and Downs', 'If You Only Had My Disposition'
- A 2745 'Old Fashioned Rose', 'Down Among the Sugarcane' (accompanist Beryl Newell)
- A 2753 'All By Yourself in the Moonlight', 'You Should See My Neighbour's Daughter'
- A 2868 'Outside', 'The One That I Love Loves Me'
- A 2869 'Ida, Sweet as Apple Cider', 'Ragging the Baby to Sleep'
- A 2874 'Smiling Irish Eyes', 'A Wee Bit o' Love'

'One More Waltz', 'Go Home and Tell Your Mother' (Fields-McHugh)

- A 3350 'She's So Nice', 'Save the Last Dance for Me'
- A 3360 'One Hour With You', 'What Would You Do?' (accompaniment by Beryl Newell)
- A 3440 'To-day 1 Feel So Happy', 'Just Because I Lost My Heart to You'
- A 3484 'Mimi', 'Isn't It Romantic?'
- A 3609 'Shuffle Up to Buffalo', 'Young and Healthy' (accompaniment by Beryl Newell)
- A 3716 'We're in the Money', 'Pettin' in the Park'
