= Victory Road =

Victory Road may refer to:

- TNA Victory Road, a professional wrestling event
- Victory Road (video game), a 1986 arcade game
- Victory Road, a street in Salt Lake City, Utah that is part of Utah State Route 186
- Victory Road (Pokémon), a location in the Pokémon video games

== See also ==
- Road to Victory (disambiguation)
- World Victory Road, Japanese MMA
