= Directed by Ken G. Hall =

Memoir by Australian film director

Directed by Ken G. Hall is the 1977 memoir by Australian film director Ken G. Hall. It covers Hall's life, from early days through to being production head of Cinesound Productions and his later years at Channel Nine, including encounters with Bert Bailey, Cecil Kellaway and Helen Twelvetrees. It also includes some notes on the Australian film industry of the 1970s.

The book was launched by Gough Whitlam who had a small role in Hall's 1938 film The Broken Melody.

The book was republished in 1981 as Australian Film: the Inside Story.
