= Gayne Dexter =

Robert James Dexter (10 October 1895 – 20 June 1966), known as Gayne Dexter, was an Australian journalist, publicist and screenwriter from Sydney. He was head of publicity at Union Theatres and Australasian Films in the 1910s, where his assistant was a young Ken G. Hall. He went on to become editor for Everyone's, the trade paper for the Australian film industry.

He died in 1966 in Bondi, New South Wales.

== Screenwriter ==
In the 1930s Dexter wrote two films for Ken G. Hall, The Squatter's Daughter (1933) and The Silence of Dean Maitland (1934). He also worked extensively overseas in New York City and London as head of publicity for Warner Bros. and doing publicity for stars such as Judy Garland and Danny Kaye.

== Filmography ==
- For the Term of His Natural Life (1927) – titles
- The Grey Glove (1928) – titles
- The Romance of Runnibede (1928) – screenplay
- The Squatter's Daughter (1933) – screenplay
- The Silence of Dean Maitland (1934) – screenplay
