= Atalanta (magazine) =

Atalanta was a British monthly magazine for girls, which was published between 1887 and 1898.

== History ==
Named after the Greek mythological heroine Atalanta, the magazine was founded by L. T. Meade as a successor to Every Girl's Magazine. It appeared monthly from January 1887 at six pence per issue. A high literary standard was aimed at; original short stories and serials were published by authors such as Robert Louis Stevenson, H. Rider Haggard, E. Nesbit, Frances Hodgson Burnett, Amy Levy, John Strange Winter, Grant Allen, Walter Besant, Maxwell Gray, and Mary Eleanor Wilkins Freeman.

Additionally the magazine contained a Scholarship and Reading Union. As part of this there were articles of criticism: Anne Thackeray on Jane Austen, Mary Ward on Elizabeth Barrett Browning, Thomas Hughes on Charles Kingsley, Charlotte Mary Yonge on John Keble and Andrew Lang on Walter Scott. Readers were invited to send in their own critical essays, for which prizes were awarded.

In 1893 Meade handed over the editorship to A. Balfour Symington, and he in turn was succeeded in 1896 by Edwin Oliver The quality of the magazine was considered to be falling in these latter years and it was closed in September 1898.
