= Yvonne Banvard =

Australian actress and theatre producer

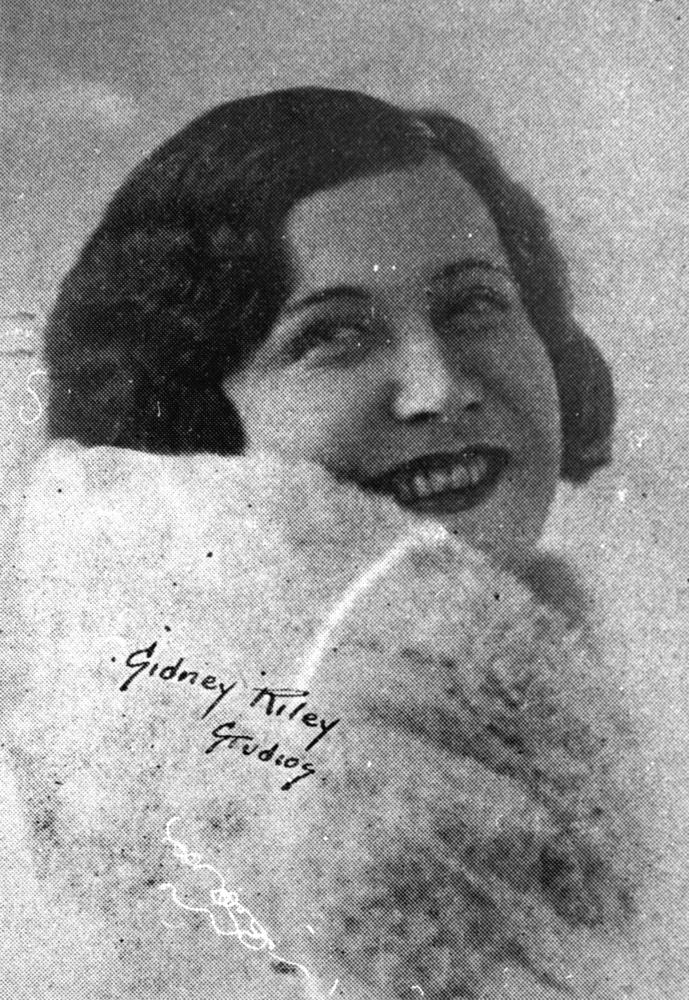
- Picture of Yvonne Banvard taken circa 1923
- Born: 25 December 1901; Melbourne, Australia
- Died: 24 June 1962 (aged 60); Sydney, Australia
- Other names: Fifi Banvard
- Occupations: Actress; Producer; Radio personality
- Spouse: Edward Ralph de Tisne (1920-1923) Ernest Cephas Hunter Broadhurst (1928-1944) Charles Kilburn (1944-1950)
- Parent: William Horley (father) Annie Moore (mother)

Yvonne (Fifi) Banvard (25 December 1901– 24 June 1962) was an Australian actress. As a child, she toured North America and gained notoriety as a talented tragedienne. She later went onto perform and produce plays, dramas, comedies and romances across Australia, as well as becoming a radio personality.

== Early life ==
Yvonne (Fifi) Banvard was born on 25 December 1901 in Melbourne. Her father was William Horley, an actor from England who toured the world with his family as The Flying Banvards. Her mother was Annie née Moore, a dancing mistress from Victoria. After her parents separated, Yvonne travelled America with her mother as part of the Pollard Lilliputian Opera Company. Banvard made her début appearance on stage aged 7 as Fifi in The Belle of New York, after which she came to be known as 'Fifi'. During her time in America, Banvard was known as the youngest tragedienne on the stage. By the time she was 17, she was playing Sadie Thompson in W Somerset Maugham's Rain.

== Career ==
In her early career, Banvard performed with Charlotte Greenwood in Canada and went on to tour North America with the Oliver Morosco company. Morosco selected Banvard to play the role of 'Peg' in J. Hartley Manners' Peg o' My Heart which she performed in 400 consecutive performances from Halifax to Vancouver. She also appeared with the Alcazar stock company and became one of Mack Sennett's bathing girls and performed in films for three years.

In 1921, she joined the Ben Fullers' vaudeville circuit in which her set-piece was a song-and-dance act with her husband, Edward Ralph de Tisne, titled 'Fifi and her Excess Baggage'. The De Tisnes were travelling to India, where her uncle Wally Banvard owned a chain of theatres, but stopped in Australia where the theatre industry was booming.

From September 1922, Banvard performed as leading lady at the Theatre Royal, Brisbane with the Reynolds-de Tisne Players. She was next employed by J. C. Williamson Film Company to perform in musical comedies. Her standout performance during that time was as Lady Jane in Rose Marie.

In October 1923, Banvard was secured by the directors of the Theatre Royal, Brisbane for their costume and musical comedy company.

In December 1929, Banvard and a selected company began performing a series of plays, dramas, comedies and romances at the Theatre Royal in Brisbane, beginning with Her Great Adventure by Roland C. Kingsley. A contemporary piece in The Daily Standard reported that Banvard was "well known to local theatregoers for her vivacious personality and dramatic talent", shining in "both comedy and emotional roles".

In February 1931, Banvard returned to Australia after a nine-month visit to England where she visited friends and continued to study the acting profession. In September that year, she joined the George Sorlie Company which opened at Her Majesty's Theatre, Brisbane on 3 October. By the 1940s, she was based in Sydney and became a radio personality on serials, comedies, and the Bob Dyer Variety Show.

Banvard was also a producer. In 1948 to 1949 she produced plays including Ah, Wilderness! at the Minerva Theatre, Sydney. After moving to Hobart in 1950, she leased the Theatre Royal and formed a repertory company – Fifi Banvard Productions. The company's first production was Ah, Wilderness! by Eugene O'Neill, and subsequent plays included Clutterbuck by Benn Levy, See How They Run by Philip King, and Night Must Fall by Emlyn Williams. After the end of the first season in February 1951, the company played a season in Mainland theatres. However, Fifi Banvard Productions turned out to be financially unsuccessful and failed to attract sufficient public support. Before leaving Tasmania, the entire wardrobe used by the Fifi Banvard Theatrical Company was sold to the Launceston Players.

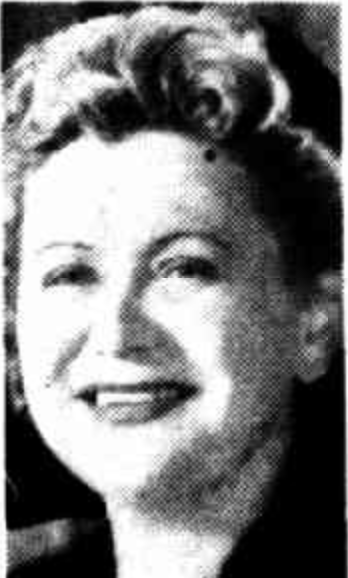
Photo of Yvonne Banvard taken circa 1952

Banvard returned to Sydney in 1952 resuming her work in radio, including on ABC. She also produced plays at the Independent Theatre for Doris Fitton and appeared in Nude with Violin in 1958 at the Theatre Royal.

In 1961, Banvard gave her final performance as Mae Peterson in Bye Bye Birdie.

== Personal life ==
Banvard was married three times. Her first husband was American actor and producer Edward Ralph de Tisne, whom she married on 19 November 1920. They separated in July 1923. She then married Ernest Cephas Hunter Broadhurst, a merchant from Perth, on 17 September 1928. They divorced in 1936. On 22 July 1944 she married Charles Kilburn, a clerk in the Royal Australian Air Force, and they divorced in 1950.

== Death ==
Banvard died of a myocardial infarction on 24 June 1962 at St Vincent's Hospital, Sydney. Her estate was left to her friend Gwen Friend with whom she had shared a flat in Double Bay, Sydney.
