= Grandad Rudd =

- Written by: Vic Roberts; George D. Parker
- Based on: play by Steele Rudd stories Grandpa's Selection and Our New Selection by Steele Rudd
- Produced by: Ken G. Hall
- Starring: Bert Bailey; Fred MacDonald
- Cinematography: Frank Hurley; George Heath
- Edited by: William Shepherd
- Production company: Cinesound Productions
- Release date: February 1935
- Running time: 90 minutes
- Country: Australia
- Language: English
- Budget: £8,000 or £15,000
- Box office: £18,000 or £20,000

Grandad Rudd is a 1935 comedy featuring the Dad and Dave characters created by Steele Rudd and based on a play by Rudd. It was a sequel to On Our Selection, and was later followed by Dad and Dave Come to Town and Dad Rudd, MP.

== Plot ==
The movie's plot is similar to that of the play: Dad Rudd (Bert Bailey) has become a successful father but is very tight with his money and oppresses his sons Dave (Fred MacDonald), Joe (William McGowan) and Dan (George Lloyd). The sons eventually stand up to their father and manage to persuade him to give them a wage increase – but he increases their rent by an equal amount.

As in the play, there is a serious subplot about Dad's grandchild Betty (Elaine Hamill) who becomes engaged to a corrupt neighbour, Henry Cook (John D’Arcy), despite the true love of another farmer, Tom Dalley (John Cameron). The climax involves a comic cricket game involving the Rudds.

== Cast ==
- Bert Bailey as Dad Rudd
- Fred MacDonald as Dave Rudd
- George Lloyd as Dan
- William McGowan as Joe
- Kathleen Hamilton as Madge
- Lilias Adeson as Lil
- Les Warton as Regan
- Elaine Hamill as Betty
- John Cameron as Tom
- John D'Arcy as Henry Cook
- Molly Raynor as Amelia Banks
- Bill Stewart as Banks
- Marie D'Alton as Mrs. Banks
- Marguerite Adele as Shirley Sanderson
- George Blackwood as School-Master
- Ambrose Foster as Young Dave
- Peggy Yeoman as Mum Rudd

== Original play ==
Gran'dad Rudd
- Original language: English
- Written by: Steele Rudd
- Genre: comedy

Premiere
- Date: 22 September 1917

The play Gran'dad Rudd was first produced in 1917, being based on the stories Grandpa's Selection and Our New Selection.

=== Plot ===
The story is set twenty years after the events of the 1912 play, On Our Selection: Dad has become a prosperous farmer and member of Parliament, while Dave has married Lily and become a father. Dad tries to bully Dave and his other son Joe (who has also married), but their wives encourage them to rebel against their father.

There were subplots involving a love triangle between Dad's granddaughter Nell, handsome Tom Dalley, who has invented a potato harvester, and unscrupulous produce agent Henry Cook; the return of a prodigal son, Dan Rudd, keen to claim Dad's estate, and his romance with Amelia Banks; and their neighbours, Mrs Regan and the Banks family.

=== Original production ===
The original production was presented by Bert Bailey and Julius Grant, and saw Bert Bailey and Fred MacDonald repeat their stage roles as Dad and Dave respectively. Making its debut on 22 September 1917, it ran for seven weeks in that city, only ending because the theatre had to vacate for another production. It then toured around the country over the next few years, although it was never as successful as On Our Selection.

== Production ==
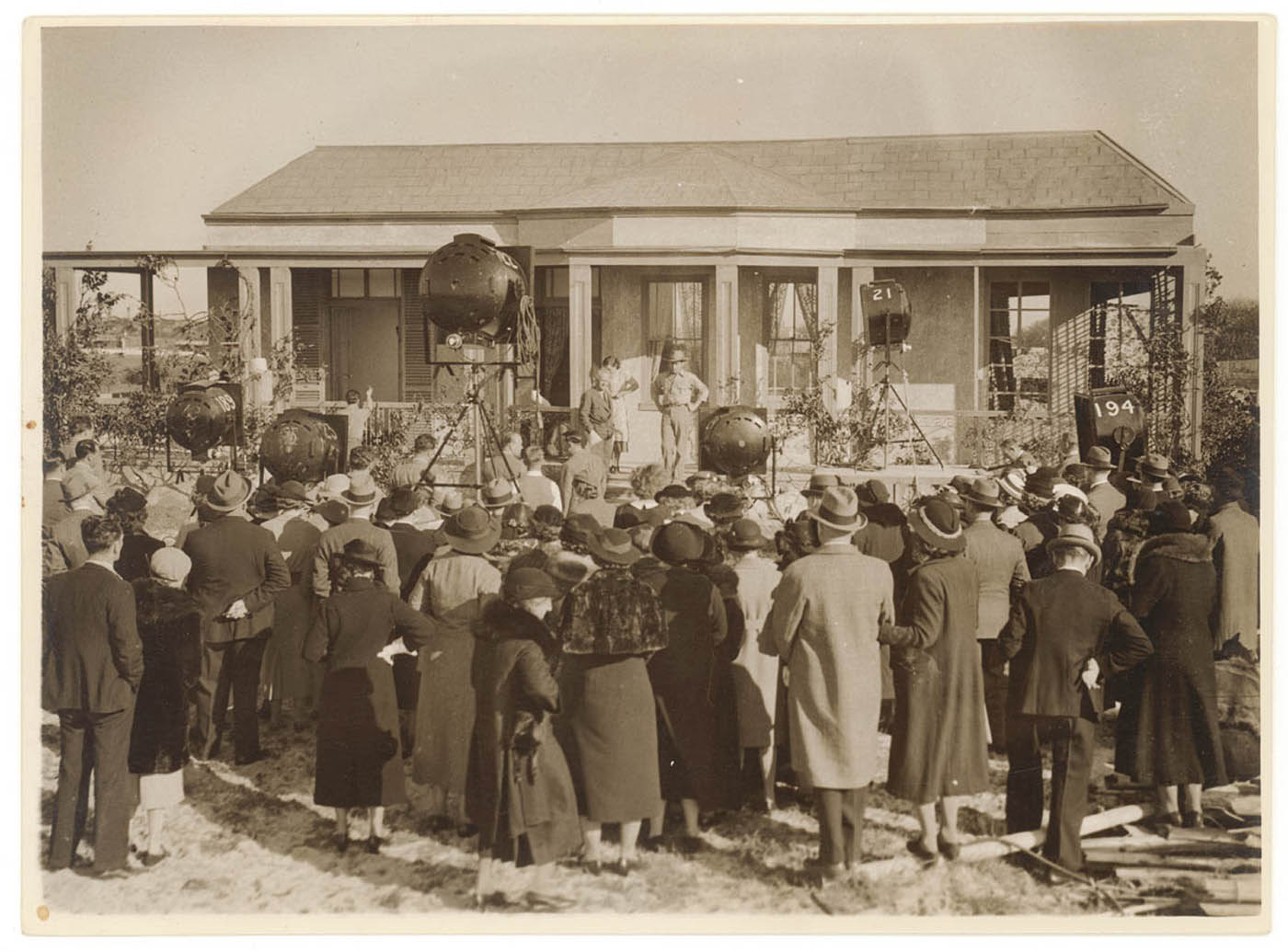
Shooting a scene for 'Grandad Rudd', Cinesound-Ken Hall, Sydney, ca. 1935, Sam Hood

=== Development ===
The box office success of On Our Selection (1932) saw Cinesound announce plans to make Gran'dad Rudd as a follow-up almost immediately, but Steele Rudd issued a statement claiming that since he wrote the play, no movie could be made without his permission. For a time there was talk the second Dad Rudd film would be Rudd's New Selection, but this did not eventuate.

It was originally reported that Bert Bailey and Ken G. Hall would write the script, as they had done for On Our Selection, but eventually the job of adaptation went to Vic Roberts and George D. Parker.

Although Grandad Rudd's production had been planned prior to making Strike Me Lucky (1934), its importance to Cinesound grew when that earlier film failed at the box office and the new studio needed a hit.

=== Shooting ===
Shooting took place over five weeks. On this and the other two Dad Rudd sequels, Cinesound paid Bert Bailey £150 a week plus 25% of the profits.

== Reception ==
Ken G Hall later said the film was successful "but it was not in the On Our Selection class as a money-spinner". According to Bert Bailey's obituary, the star thought this drop was caused in part by him playing the role with a clean shaven top lip. "The slight change took him out of character."

Variety wrote "slapstick all the way through, but sure-fire on local consumption... Pic is a sequel to On Our Selection (Down on the Farm), but 100% improvement in direction and acting... Pic is rich in rough laughs and should click especially well out in the sticks where they like this type... Acting and photography are both excellent, and Hall's direction is about his best to date. tunning time is overlong and could be clipped to speed up tempo. "

The film was released in England under the title of Ruling the Roost. Kinematograph Weekly wrote "Being an Australian production, there are moments when the conception hardly tallies with our ideas of family home life, but the many humorous interludes, the teamwork of both principals and crowd, provide all the essentials to ensure sound entertainment. The cricket match of Rudd family v. the Regans must surely be the funniest and most unorthodox match ever."

Filmink argued:

the 1935 movie is easily the weakest of the Hall/Rudd films. The other three put Dad Rudd under all sorts of genuine stress (Depression, threats of bankruptcy, corruption) but this one doesn’t, so Dad’s constant irascibility is annoying more than fun. Also, it gives all the bulk of what might be called “Dave duties” (i.e being dim, annoying Dad, romancing an equally thick female) to Dan rather than Dave, and while George Lloyd, who plays Dan, is a fine performer, he simply is not as engaging as Fred McDonald’s Dave... Furthermore, the pretty Rudd girl in Grandad Rudd (played by Elaine Hammil) is easily the weakest in the series, suckered in by the baddy despite Dad’s warnings, lacking any of the high spirits and smarts we get from other Rudd girls.

== Follow up ==
Cinesound originally intended to follow this movie with a version of Robbery Under Arms but decided not to proceed because of uncertainty arising from a ban the NSW government had on films about bushrangers. The company ended up ceasing production for several months in 1935 to enable Hall to travel to Hollywood and research production methods.
