= Maxwell Gray =

English novelist and poet (1846–1923)

Mary Gleed Tuttiett
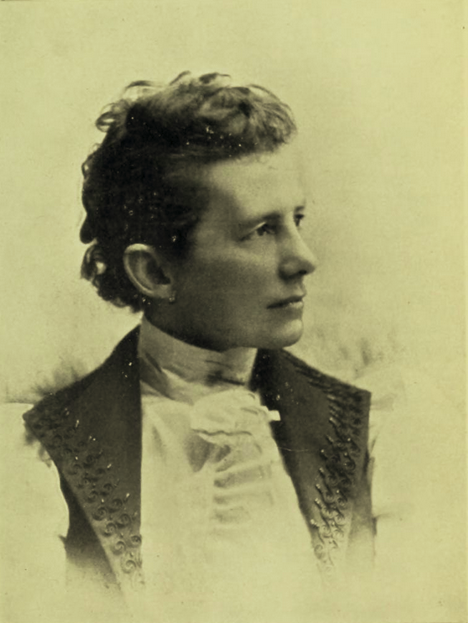
- Maxwell Gray in Poets of the Wight, 1922
- Born: 11 December 1846; Newport, Isle of Wight, England
- Died: 21 September 1923 (aged 76); Ealing, London, England
- Occupations: Novelist, poet, essayist
- Writing career
- Pen name: Maxwell Gray
- Notable work: The Silence of Dean Maitland

Mary Gleed Tuttiett (11 December 1846 – 21 September 1923), better known by the pen name Maxwell Gray, was an English novelist and poet best known for her 1886 novel The Silence of Dean Maitland.

== Life ==
Tuttiett was born and brought up in Newport, Isle of Wight, the daughter of the surgeon Frank Bampfylde Tuttiett and his wife Elizabeth née Gleed.

Although largely self-educated, she attended Queen's College, London to train to be a governess. In early adulthood she visited London, various other parts of England, and Yverdon-les-Bains in Switzerland; but for the majority of her working life as a writer had constant debilitating illness from asthma and rheumatism—reports described her as "a confirmed invalid"—that left her unable to leave her bed for more than two to three hours a day. She wrote lying on a sofa.

For much of her life she lived and worked confined to her home in Newport, first at Pyle Street (where works up to The Last Sentence were written) then at Castle Road, only making occasional trips out by carriage or bath-chair. On one such trip she visited the American writer Wolcott Balestier, whose sister married Rudyard Kipling, when he and his family were staying at Blackgang. Her 1893 novel The Last Sentence was dedicated to Balestier after his early death.

She was strongly interested in women's rights, being one of a number of writers who petitioned in support of the Women's Suffrage Bill, and such themes appear in a number of her novels.

After her father's death in 1895, she moved to West Richmond, remaining in London until her death in 1923, aged 76, at Ealing. In 2023 the Oxford Dictionary of National Biography included her, Mrs. Disney Leith, Jean Middlemass, Florence L. Barclay, Gabrielle Wodnil and Bessie Marchant in new biographies of eleven Victorian writers who have caught the attention of academics.

== Works ==
Mary Tuttiett began her literary career by contributing essays, poems, articles, and short stories to various periodicals including Atalanta.

Her first novel, The Broken Tryst, was published in 1879 to lukewarm reviews, but Tuttiett achieved critical and popular success with the 1886 The Silence of Dean Maitland ("a powerful and impressive story, which was appreciated both by critics and by the public"). This tells the story of a churchman who gets a young woman pregnant and kills her father in a fight, then allows the wrongful imprisonment of his friend for the manslaughter. On the eve of his accession to bishop, he is forced to face his guilt when that friend returns, released from prison on ticket of leave.

The reader for the publisher Kegan Paul, Alfred Chenevix Trench, initially thought The Silence of Dean Maitland "a little too unorthodox" for his religious clientele, but on the second reading decided it was "too good to refuse". The release saw a deal of speculation about the authorship, including theories that it has been written by a well-known ecclesiastic or the daughter of the Archbishop of Canterbury. The poet Tennyson praised the book, driving to Newport to meet Miss Tuttiett as her illness prevented her visiting him at his winter home near Freshwater.

The Silence of Dean Maitland and a number of Mary Tuttiett's other novels are set in a fictionalised Isle of Wight, in which Newport, Calbourne, Swainstone, Brading and Arreton appear as "Oldport", "Malbourne", "Swaynestone", "Barling" and "Arden".

She also wrote a number of poetry anthologies.

In 1910, Arthur Mee and J.A. Hammerton's The World's Greatest Books said of The Silence of Dean Maitland that it had immediately and permanently established her name in the front rank of living novelists. The obituary in The Times described her works overall as "characterised by a delicate grace and charm, and generally suggested a serious purpose, but she can never be said to have equalled her first success".

The Silence of Dean Maitland became a successful stage play, and was filmed three times: in 1914 by Raymond Longford, in 1915 (under the title Sealed Lips) by John Ince, and in 1934 in Australia by Ken G. Hall. The Reproach of Annesley was filmed in 1915, and The Last Sentence in 1917.

== Bibliography ==
- The Broken Tryst (1879): concerning a young woman torn between love for a miller's son serving in India and for the colonel of his regiment.
- The Silence of Dean Maitland (1886): concerning an ambitious churchman who kills a man and lets his best friend be wrongfully imprisoned for the crime
- Reproach of Annesley (serialised 1888–89, book 1889): a romance between an heiress and a young officer is blighted by the suspicion that he may have killed a rival for her affections.
- Westminster chimes and other poems (1890)
- In the Heart of the Storm (1891): an army officer is torn between his childhood sweetheart and a woman he meets while serving in India during the Siege of Lucknow
- An Innocent Impostor (1892): a short story collection, leading with a comedy of mistaken identity
- The Last Sentence (1894): in which a judge, who has concealed for years his disastrous first marriage, finds himself in the position of sentencing his daughter to death for child murder
- A Costly Freak (1894): concerning the complications that arise when a naive and impoverished curate finds a large sum of money in his Bible, and believes it to be put there by divine intervention.
- Lays of the Dragon Slayer (1894): poetry, a retelling of the Nibelunglied.
- Sweethearts and Friends (1897): a romance between a suffragette medical student and an otherwise perfect but sexist politician.
- Ribstone Pippins: A Country Tale (1898): a young carter's plans to marry his sweetheart are dashed by the story that she has eloped with another man.
- The House of Hidden Treasure (1899): a family saga about a woman from a well-to-do family who is cheated, by misfortune and malice, of her inheritance and chances of love.
- The Forest Chapel and Other Poems (1899)
- The World's Mercy (1899): short story collection, leading with a tragedy about the redemption of an alcoholic doctor.
- Four-leaved Clover (1901): the saga of a romance between an honour-bound army officer and the young woman who fell in love with him at a ball.
- Richard Rosny (1903): a family saga about the life and unhappy marriage of a naval officer forced to give up his promising career after a family tragedy.
- The Great Refusal (1906): concerning a young man who becomes disaffected with the practices of his wealthy father's business; is disinherited and forced to earn a living in London while testing his social theories; and finally becomes leader of a group of social reformers, the Brotherhood of the Golden Rule, who emigrate to East Africa.
- The Suspicions of Ermengarde (1908): a young married woman on a convalescent holiday in the south of France finds she is being shadowed by a mysterious stranger.
- England's Son and Other Poems (1910)
- Unconfessed (1911): a rich landowner's life unravels on the revelation that he may have implicated his younger brother in a crime.
- Something Afar (US title The Desire of the Moth - "a Romance of the Italian Lakes"): a retired middle-aged bank clerk finds a message that leads him to Italy to seek the truth behind his betrayal decades earlier by the young countess he loved.
- The World Mender (1916): the story of a politician's rise from working-class roots, until his career is blighted by a romance with an unscrupulous woman
- The Diamond Pendant (1918): a popular governess, in thrall to a blackmailer, becomes a jewel thief.
- A Bit of Blue Stone, and other stories (1923), The title story is a romance between a convalescent soldier and a VAD nurse set in Bournemouth during World War One. The anthology also includes After the Crash, an SF story set in a post-apocalyptic London.
