= Jean Harlow filmography =

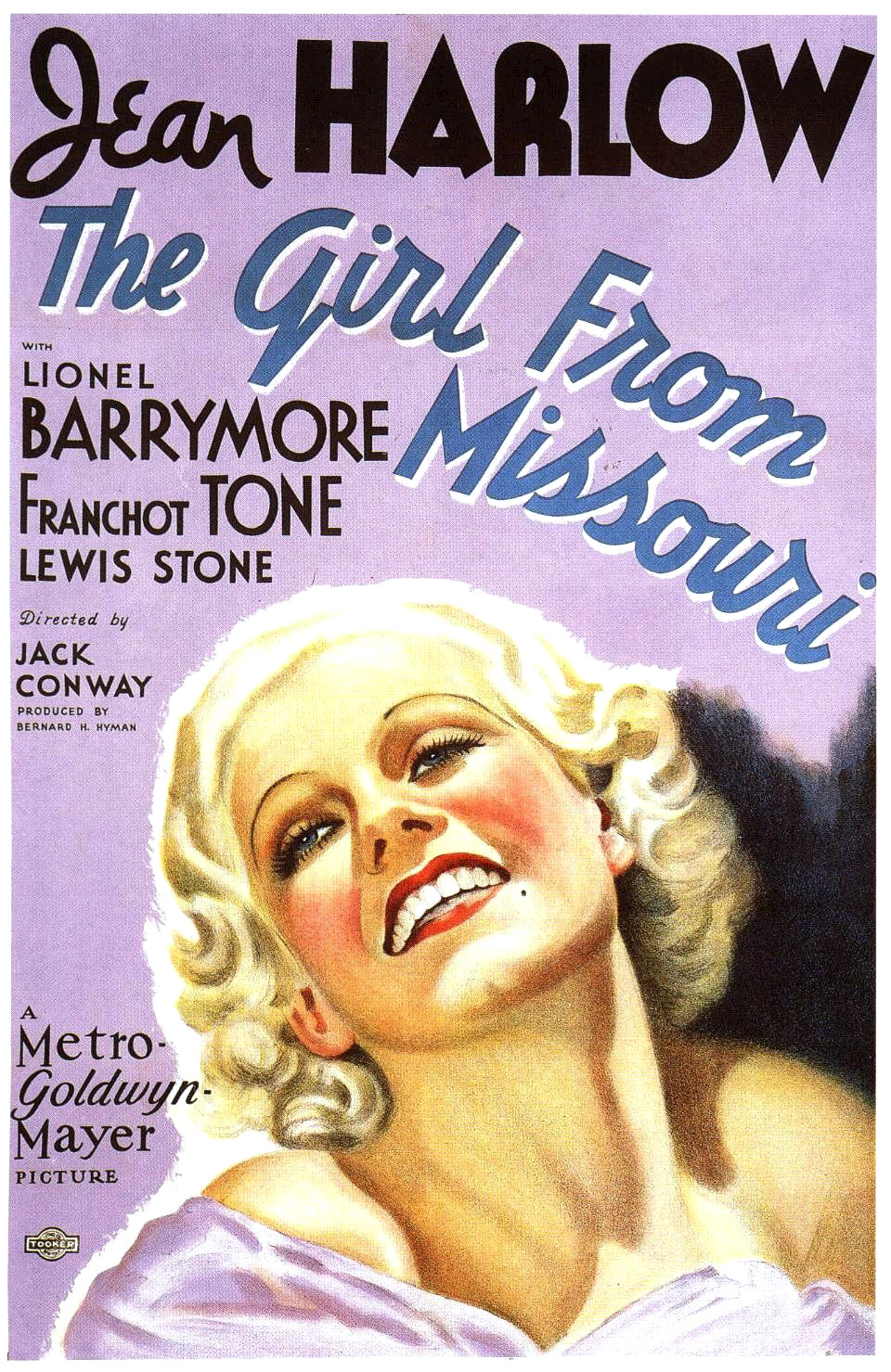
Jean Harlow in The Girl from Missouri (1934)

Jean Harlow (March 3, 1911 – June 7, 1937) was an American actress who made her uncredited debut in two 1928 films: Honor Bound for Fox Film; and Moran of the Marines for Paramount Pictures. While waiting for a friend at the studio in 1928, she was discovered by studio executives who gave her letters of introduction to casting agencies, where she was offered the two small roles that subsequently launched her film career. During the initial two years of her career, Harlow appeared uncredited in 16 films, including several Hal Roach productions developed for Laurel and Hardy. Her first speaking role was a bit part in the 1929 American pre-Code romantic comedy The Saturday Night Kid, starring Clara Bow and Jean Arthur. The film has since been preserved by the UCLA Film and Television Archive.

Harlow's career breakthrough came In 1930, when she was chosen to star in Hell's Angels, as a last-minute replacement for Norwegian actress Greta Nissen. Harlow was introduced to producer Howard Hughes by her former boyfriend James Hall, one of the film's actors, resulting in Hughes putting her under contract. The film's lead actor Ben Lyon is sometimes given credit for her introduction to Hughes. The movie made her an overnight star with the audiences. Hughes, however, was less than enthusiastic about her, in spite of keeping her under contract. Her feeling towards Hughes were mutual, and her family tried to get her out of her contract. The strained relations were exacerbated by false rumors of a love affair between them. Her performances in movies like The Secret Six (1931), her first film pairing opposite Clark Gable, and The Public Enemy (1931) opposite James Cagney, were not well received. She remained with Hughes, until he agreed to Metro-Goldwyn-Mayer's offer to buy her contract in 1932 for $30,000 (equivalent to $691,390 in 2024).

Under exclusive contract to MGM, she became one of the studio's most popular actresses. She starred in Red-Headed Woman (1932), and in Red Dust (1932), which capitalized on her "laughing vamp" image and established her as a film comedienne. From 1933 onward, Harlow was a steady top box office draw for the studio. Among the vehicles she starred in were China Seas (1935) with Clark Gable and Wallace Beery, Suzy (1936) with Cary Grant and Franchot Tone, Libeled Lady (1936) with William Powell, Spencer Tracy, and Myrna Loy, and Personal Property (1937) with Robert Taylor.

During the filming of Saratoga in June 1937, Harlow collapsed on the set, effectively halting the filming. She died on June 7, at the age of 26, the cause of her death attributed to kidney failure. The studio had initial plans to start anew, with either Jean Arthur or Virginia Bruce in Harlow's role, but public backlash led to MGM finishing with Harlow's footage that was already 90% complete. Three Harlow look-alikes were used to fill in the unfinished gaps – one for close-ups, one for long-distance shots, and another to dub Harlow's voice. When the film was released, it became the highest-earning film of her career, and critics proclaimed it her best performance. Harlow's star on the Hollywood Walk of Fame was installed at 6910 Hollywood Boulevard, in Hollywood, California, on February 8, 1960. (Note: Not given for box office draw or popularity, the Walk of Fame process involves (1) a nomination by a person or group, (2) a review by the Walk of Fame Committee, and (3) an up-front payment for installation and upkeep, from either the nominators or the celebrity. Several celebrities have multiple stars, with actor and business man Gene Autry holding the record with five stars. Current up-front costs run about $40,000 for each star.)

== Films ==
=== Short subjects ===
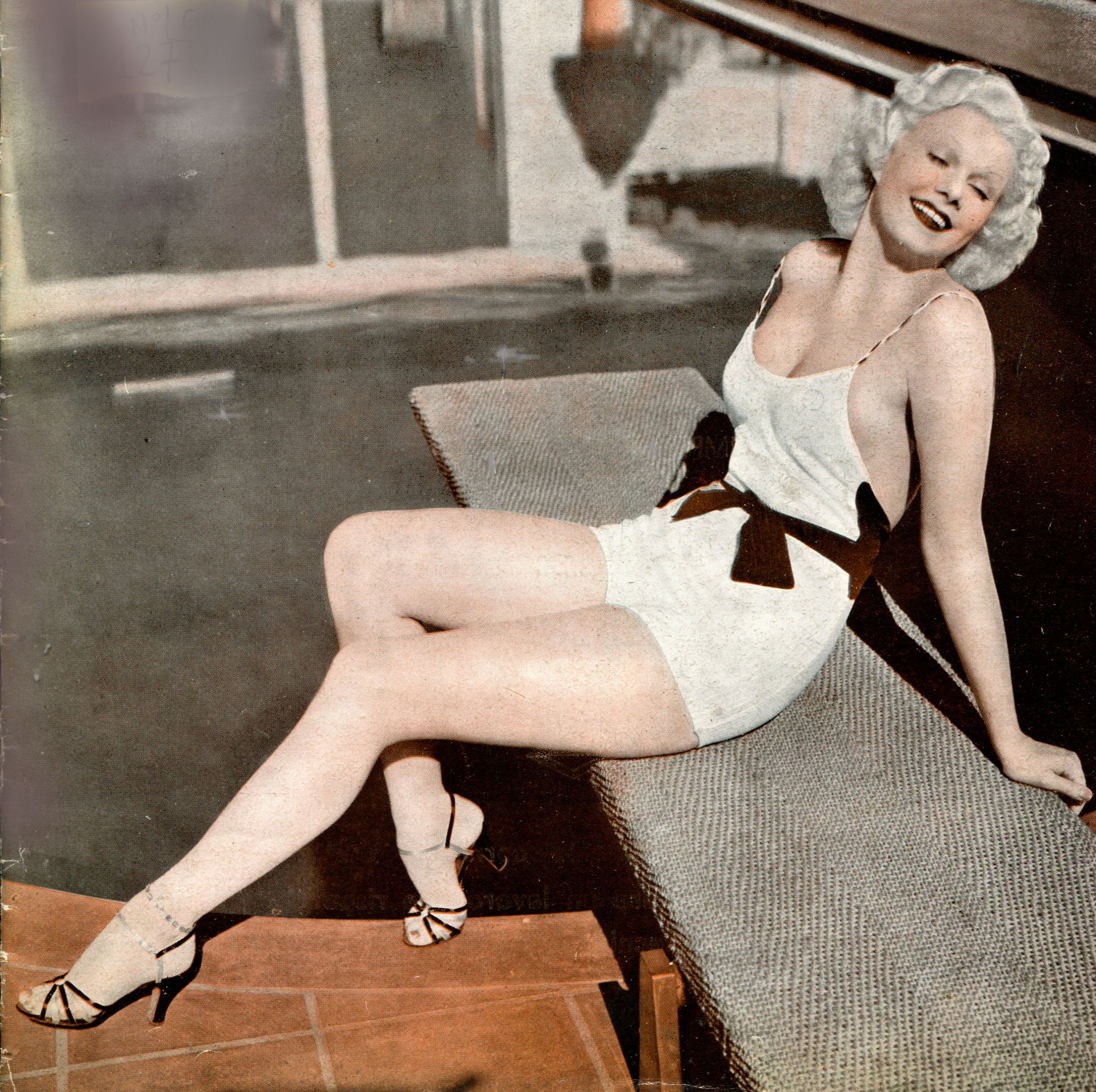
Publicity image (1934)

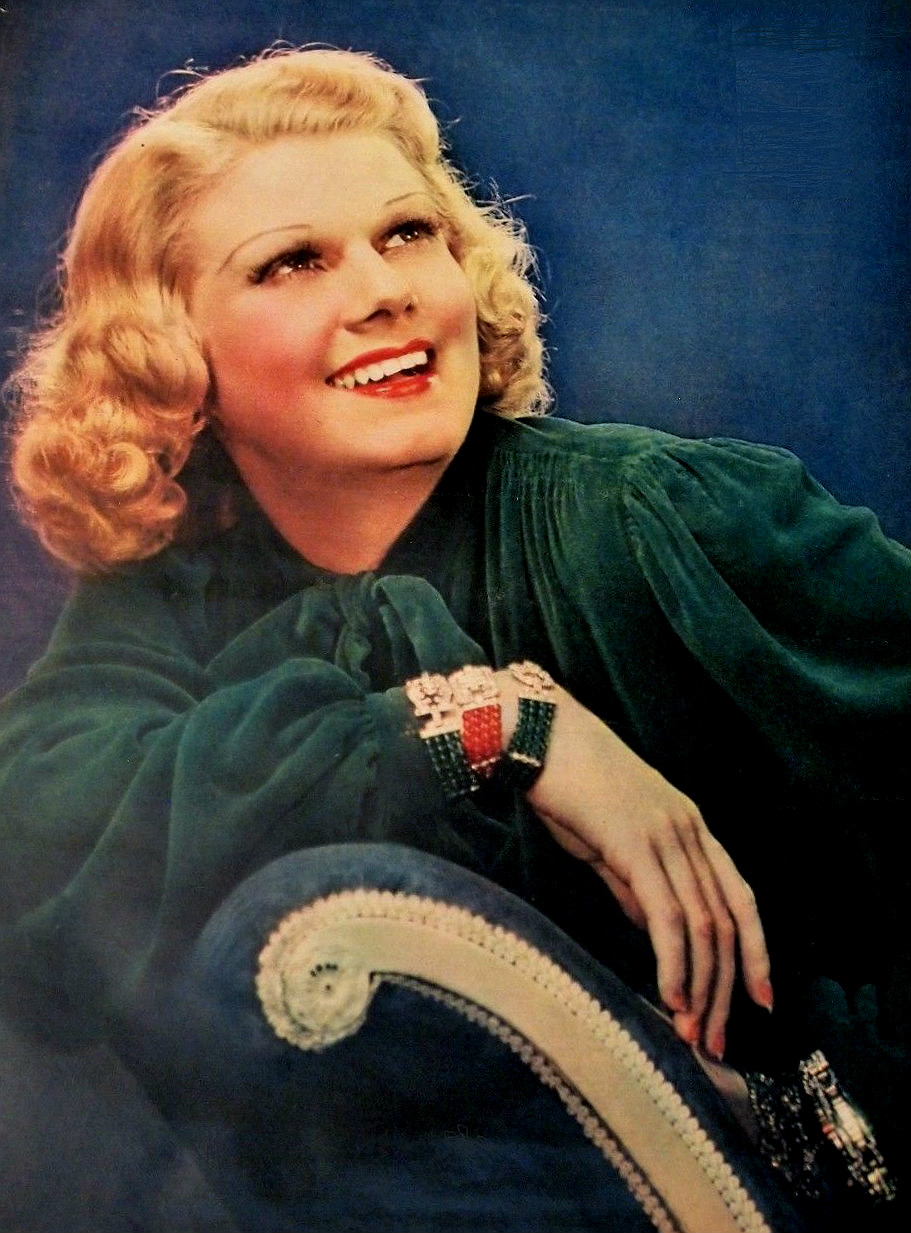
Cover of New York Sunday News magazine (1937)

Jean Harlow short subjects
Title	Year	Role	Notes	Ref(s)
Chasing Husbands, lost film	1928	Bathing beauty	Uncredited; Charley Chase film	
Liberty	1929	Woman in cab	Laurel and Hardy silent short for Hal Roach; MGM	
Why Is a Plumber?	1929	Unknown	Hal Roach	
The Unkissed Man	1929	Unknown	Hal Roach	
Double Whoopee	1929	Swanky blonde	Laurel and Hardy silent short for Hal Roach	
Thundering Toupees	1929	Unknown	Hal Roach	
Bacon Grabbers	1929	Mrs. Kennedy	Hal Roach; Laurel and Hardy	
Weak But Willing	1929	Unbilled extra	Al Christie producer	
Screen Snapshots	1932	Herself	Columbia Pictures	
Hollywood on Parade No. A-12	1933	Herself	Criterion Productions/Paramount	
Hollywood on Parade No. B-1	1933	Herself	The Candid Camera Story (Very Candid) the Metro-Goldwyn-Mayer Pictures 1937 Convention; Preserved by the UCLA Film & Television Archive.	
Hollywood on Parade No. B-6	1934	Herself	Criterion Productions/Paramount	
The Candid Camera Story (Very Candid) the Metro-Goldwyn-Mayer Pictures 1937 Convention	1937	Herself	Uncredited; MGM	

=== Feature-length films ===
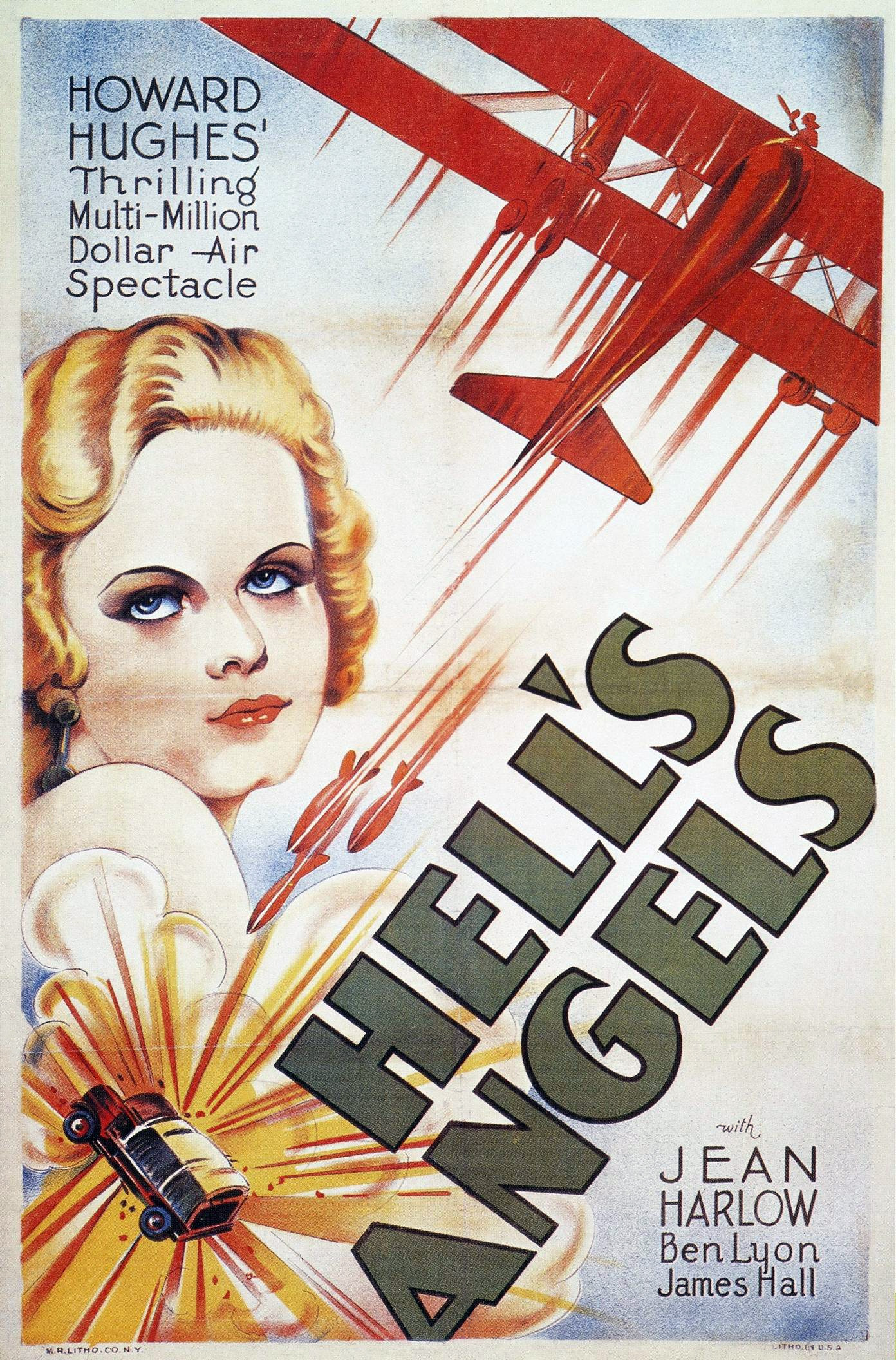
Hell's Angels (1930)

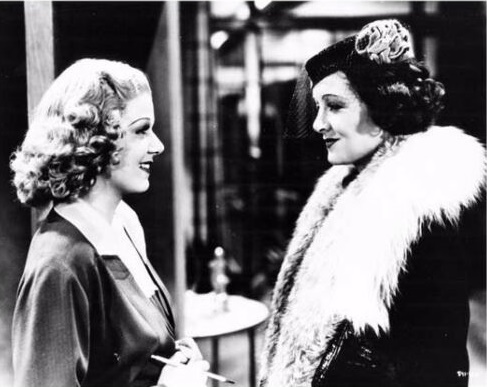
Jean Harlow and Myrna Loy in Wife vs. Secretary (1936)

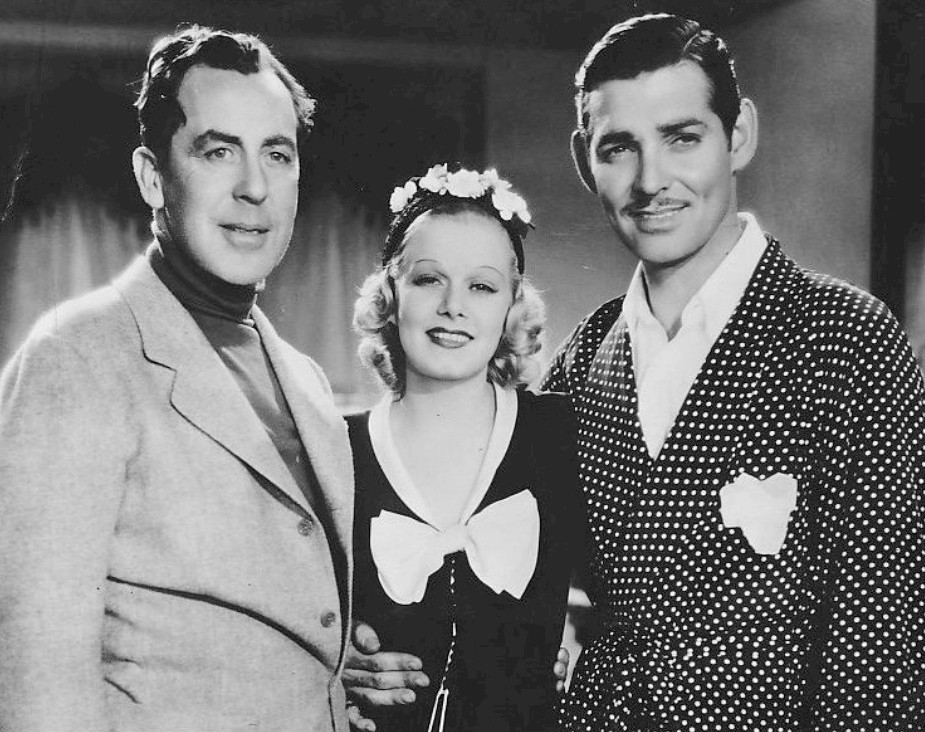
Jack Conway, Jean Harlow, and Clark Gable in Saratoga (1937)

Jean Harlow feature-length films
Title	Year	Role	Notes	Ref(s)
Honor Bound	1928	Extra	Fox Film	
Moran of the Marines	1928		Uncredited, lost film Paramount Pictures	
Fugitives	1929		Uncredited; Fox Film	
Why Be Good?	1929	Blonde on Rooftop Bench at Junior's Second Party	Uncredited; First National Pictures	
Close Harmony	1929	Chorus Girl	Uncredited; Paramount Pictures	
Masquerade	1929		Uncredited; Fox Film	
The Saturday Night Kid	1929	Hazel	Paramount Pictures Famous Lasky Corp. Preserved by the UCLA Film & Television Archive.	
The Love Parade	1929	Lady-in-Waiting	Uncredited; Paramount Famous Lasky Corp.	
This Thing Called Love	1929		Uncredited; Pathé Exchange	
New York Nights	1929	Party Guest	Uncredited; United Artists Corp	
Hell's Angels	1930	Helen	Caddo Company, Inc. (Howard Hughes); Preserved at the UCLA Film & Television Archive	
City Lights	1931	"Extra" in restaurant scene	Edited out of the final film United Artists	
The Secret Six	1931	Anne Courtland	MGM	
The Public Enemy	1931	Gwen Allen	Warner Bros.	
Iron Man	1931	Rose Mason	Universal Pictures	
Goldie	1931	Goldie	Fox Film; Preserved at the UCLA Film & Television Archive	
Platinum Blonde	1931	Anne Schuyler	Columbia Pictures	
Three Wise Girls	1932	Cassie Barnes	Columbia Pictures	
The Beast of the City	1932	Daisy Stevens, aka Mildred Beaumont	MGM	
Scarface	1932	Blonde at Paradise Club	Uncredited; Fox Film	
Red-Headed Woman	1932	Lillian "Lil" / "Red" Andrews Legendre	MGM	
Red Dust	1932	Vantine	MGM	
Hold Your Man	1933	Ruby Adams	MGM	
Dinner at Eight	1933	Kitty Packard	MGM	
Bombshell	1933	Lola Burns	MGM	
The Girl from Missouri	1934	Eadie Chapman	MGM	
Reckless	1935	Mona Leslie	MGM	
China Seas	1935	Dolly "China Doll" Portland	MGM	
Riffraff	1936	Hattie Muller	MGM	
Wife vs. Secretary	1936	Helen "Whitey" Wilson	MGM	
Suzy	1936	Suzy Trent	MGM	
Libeled Lady	1936	Gladys Benton	MGM	
Personal Property	1937	Crystal Wetherby	MGM	
Saratoga	1937	Carol Clayton	MGM	

== Bibliography ==
- Bret, David (2014). Jean Harlow: Tarnished Angel. Aurum Press. ISBN 978-1-78131-343-5.
- Guilbert, Georges-Claude (2018). Gay Icons: The (Mostly) Female Entertainers Gay Men Love. McFarland. ISBN 978-1-4766-3301-5.
- Neibaur, James L. (2019). The Jean Harlow films. Jefferson, North Carolina: McFarland and Company. ISBN 978-1-4766-3602-3.
- Stenn, David (1993). Bombshell : the life and death of Jean Harlow. New York : Doubleday. ISBN 978-0-385-42157-7.
- Watz, Edward (2016). Wheeler & Woolsey: The Vaudeville Comic Duo and Their Films, 1929–1937. McFarland. ISBN 978-1-4766-1684-1.
- Webb, Graham (2020). Encyclopedia of American Short Films, 1926–1959. McFarland. ISBN 978-1-4766-3926-0.
