= That's Cricket =

1931 film

- Directed by: Ken G. Hall
- Produced by: Ken G. Hall
- Narrated by: Lionel Lunn
- Production company: Cinesound Productions
- Release date: 1931
- Running time: 17 minutes
- Country: Australia
- Language: English

That's Cricket is a 1931 Australian featurette from director Ken G. Hall about the game of cricket and its importance to the British Empire. It features appearances from some of Australia's top cricketers of the day and footage of the Australian cricket team in England in 1930.

== Cast ==
- Lionel Lunn
- Don Bradman
- Clarrie Grimmett
- Clem Hill
- Alan Kippax
- Stan McCabe
- William Oldfield
- Bill Ponsford
- Bill Woodfull
