= Princess Theatre (Sydney) =

Theatre in Sydney, Australia

Princess Theatre in 1925

The Princess Theatre was an entertainment venue on George Street, Sydney's Broadway.

== History ==
Several Sydney theatres were named "Princess" in the 19th-century:

- The Princess Theatre on George Street was well enough established in 1867 to be regarded as a local landmark.
- The old Masonic Hall in York Street was renamed "Princess Theatre" in 1886,

In August 1908 J. F. W. Thiel (also spelled Thiele) (Note: Johann Friedrich William Thiele petitioned for bankruptcy in 1914. He became a naturalised citizen of Australia sometime before September 1914. His bankruptcy was not due to motion picture losses but a debt he incurred with the Sydney council. No more has been found.) and his Australian manager Jack Gavin opened the Bijou Theatre on George Street, on Railway Square opposite the railway station, to show moving pictures. Thiele's Star Pictures opened a theatre at Rozelle and another on King Street, Newtown in 1910 and in 1911 a tent theatre in conjunction with Brennan's Amphitheatre. Business was brisk, but arson attempts and thefts of film resulted in diminished patronage and huge losses.

West's Pictures purchased the theatre in 1911 and, after some refurbishment, reopened it as the Princess The first film shown was Oberammergau and the Passion Play.

In 1911 the theatre was sub-let to James C. Bain to be the headquarters of his vaudeville company.

The property was sold in 1925 and became a store for Marcus Clark & Co.
