= The Silence of Dean Maitland =

1886 novel by Maxwell Gray

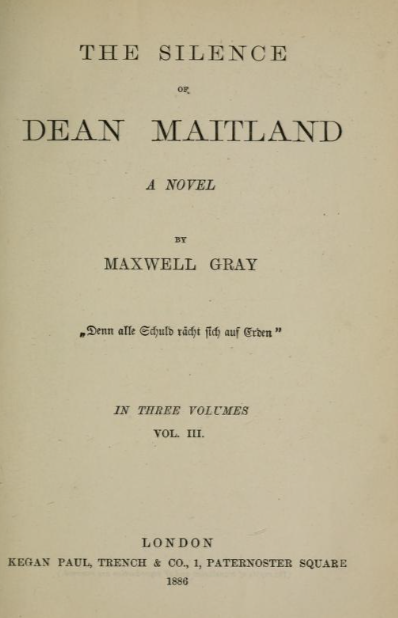
- Title page for The Silence of Dean Maitland (1886)
- Author: Maxwell Gray
- Language: English
- Genre: romantic melodrama
- Publisher: Kegan Paul, Trench & Co, London
- Publication date: October 1886
- Publication place: United Kingdom
- Media type: Print (Hardback, 3 volumes)
- Preceded by: The Broken Tryst
- Followed by: The Reproach of Annesley

The Silence of Dean Maitland is an 1886 novel by Maxwell Gray (the pen name of Mary Gleed Tuttiett). Set in a fictionalized Isle of Wight, particularly around Calbourne, it concerns an ambitious clergyman who accidentally kills the father of a young woman he has made pregnant, then allows his best friend to be wrongly convicted for the crime. A popular bestseller, it was filmed in 1914, in 1915 (under the title Sealed Lips), and in 1934.
