= Ken G. Hall =

Australian film producer and director (1901–1994)

Ken G. Hall AO OBE
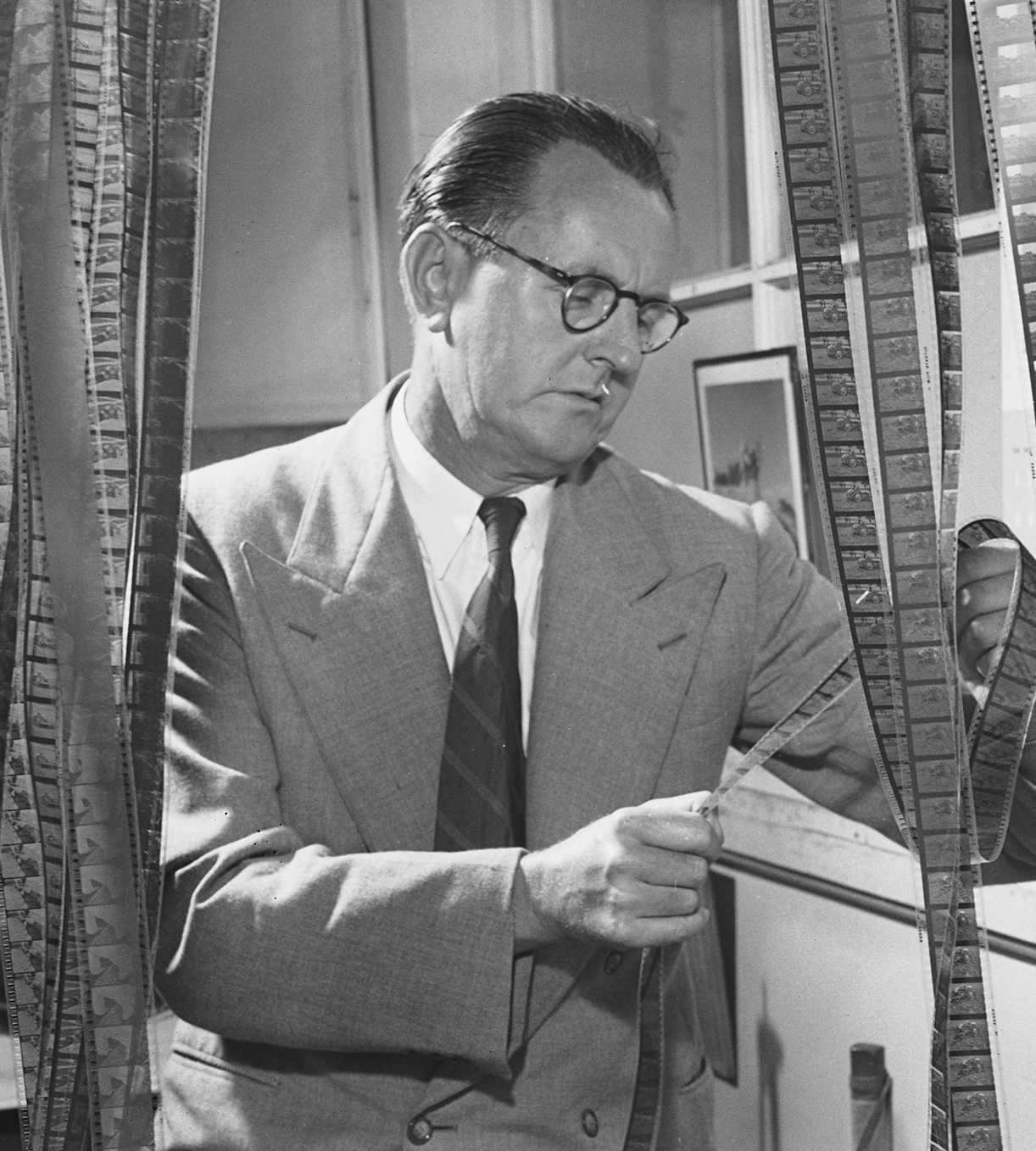
- Hall in 1950
- Born: Kenneth George Hall; 22 February 1901; Paddington, New South Wales, Australia
- Died: 8 February 1994 (aged 92); Sydney, New South Wales, Australia
- Occupations: Film producer; film director; studio executive
- Years active: 1928-1957
- Spouse: Irene Addison (m. 1925; died 1972)

Kenneth George Hall AO OBE (22 February 1901 – 8 February 1994) was an Australian film producer and director, considered one of the most important figures in the history of the Australian film industry. He was the first Australian to win an Academy Award.

== Early years ==
Kenneth George Hall was born in Paddington, a suburb of Sydney, New South Wales, in 1901, the third child of Charles and Florence Hall. He was educated at North Sydney Boys' High School.

At age 15, with the help of his father, he gained a cadetship at the Sydney Evening News, where he became friends with a young Kenneth Slessor, then a cadet for another paper. Two years later, he became a publicist for Union Theatres, initially working as an assistant to Gayne Dexter. He had a six-month stint as manager for the Lyceum Theatre then returned to publicity, working his way up to national publicity director, "the highest post in film publicity in Australia" at that time.

In 1924, Hall joined the American distribution company First National Pictures as a publicist, and visited Hollywood the following year.

== Directing career ==
=== Early years: 1928–1930 ===
Hall began making films in 1928 when at First National he was assigned to recut and shoot additional sequences for a German movie about the Battle of Cocos, Our Emden. The resulting film, The Exploits of the Emden, was a local hit.

Hall moved back to Union Theatres, running publicity for the State Theatre in Sydney, and working on the campaign against the proposed entertainment tax from Stanley Bruce's government. He eventually became assistant to Stuart F. Doyle, managing director of the company.

=== Formation of Cinesound: 1931–1934 ===
Doyle established Cinesound Productions to make local films and assigned Hall to direct a number of shorts including Thar She Blows! (1931), about the whaling industry, and That's Cricket (1931). He then gave Hall the job of directing a film adaptation of the popular play On Our Selection, adapted by Bert Bailey from the writings of Steele Rudd about the adventures of a fictional Australian farming family, the Rudds, and the perennial father-and-son duo, 'Dad and Dave'. Hall persuaded Bailey to reprise his stage performance as Dad Rudd. The result was a massively popular film, which was among the top four most popular films in Australian cinemas in 1932, earning £46,000 in Australia and New Zealand by the end of 1933.

Portrait of Ken G. Hall (Australian film director) in his director's chair, Sydney, 1938

Hall and Cinesound decided to follow it with another adaptation of a play written by Bailey, The Squatter's Daughter (1933). It was a melodrama set in the Australian bush, and starred a discovery of Hall's, Jocelyn Howarth, who later had a Hollywood career as "Constance Worth". It was successful at the box office. During this time he made a short documentary Ghosts of Port Arthur (1933).

Hall's third feature was The Silence of Dean Maitland (1934), another melodrama based on a play (which had been based on a novel). It starred English stage star John Longden. The film encountered censorship issues but was highly popular. Dean Maitland was released on a double bill with Cinesound Varieties (1934), a short film directed by Hall featuring several musical acts.

Hall's fourth feature, Strike Me Lucky (1934), was a vehicle for stage comedian Roy "Mo" Rene, one of the most popular performers in Australia. It was Hall's first feature that was a film original, and not based on other material. However the film was not well received and Hall later said it was the only one of his movies not to go into profit.

=== Middle career: 1935–1937 ===
Needing a sure-fire hit, Hall then persuaded Bert Bailey to reprise his role as Dad Rudd in Grandad Rudd (1935), based on a play co-written by Bailey. It was popular, although not as big a hit as On Our Selection.

Hall intended to follow this movie with a version of Robbery Under Arms but decided not to proceed because of uncertainty arising from a ban the NSW government had on films about bushrangers. Cinesound ceased production for several months in 1935 to enable Hall to travel to Hollywood and research production methods.

Hall returned to Australia with new filmmaking equipment and an American screenwriter Edmond Seward, who was to take over Cinesound's story department. Seward wrote Thoroughbred (1936), a horse racing drama based on the life of Phar Lap. It starred imported Hollywood actor Helen Twelvetrees and was a success.

Seward also wrote Hall's next film, Orphan of the Wilderness (1936), the story of a boxing kangaroo. It was meant to be a 50-minute movie in the vein of Cinesound Varieties but Hall decided to expand it to feature length.

Hall returned to comedy with It Isn't Done (1937), based on an idea by its star, Cecil Kellaway. It was the first movie Hall made from a script by Frank Harvey, who would write most of his subsequent films. It was also the film debut of Shirley Ann Richards.

Richards was the female lead in Hall's next film, Tall Timbers (1937), an adventure tale set in logging country, based on a story by Frank Hurley. It was followed by Lovers and Luggers.

=== Comic series: 1938–1940 ===
Hall made two films with comic George Wallace: Let George Do It (1938) and Gone to the Dogs. In between these two, he made a third Rudd film, Dad and Dave Come to Town (1938), which featured a performance from a young Peter Finch. This has been described as one of Hall's most personal movies.

Hall gave Finch a bigger role in Mr Chedworth Steps Out (1939), a vehicle for Cecil Kellaway. Hall produced and co-wrote, but did not direct, Come Up Smiling (1939), a vehicle for Will Mahoney. He made a fourth and final Rudd, Dad Rudd, M.P. (1940), which introduced Grant Taylor.

== World War II ==
Film production at Cinesound ground to a halt with the advent of World War II, although Hall kept busy during this period producing and directing newsreels, documentaries and short subjects, including Road to Victory (1941) and Anzacs in Overalls (1941).

Hall also did shorts with dramatised segments, such as Another Threshold (1942), and short features, 100,000 Cobbers (1942) and South West Pacific (1943).

=== Kokoda Front Line (1942) ===
His most notable newsreel was the Oscar-winning Kokoda Front Line! (1942) – the first time an Australian film/documentary was awarded an Oscar.

== Post-war career ==
=== Smithy (1946) ===
After the war Hall returned to feature film production, enjoying a big success with Smithy, a film biography of Australia's most famous aviator, Sir Charles Kingsford Smith, which he produced, co-wrote and directed. This film was financed by Columbia Pictures, who went on to offer its star, Ron Randell, a long-term contract in Hollywood.

However, attempts by Hall to make further feature films (particularly an adaptation of the novel Robbery Under Arms, which he later described as "the film I wanted to make more than any other") were not successful, partly because the Greater Union cinema chain, who had backed all of Cinesound's films in the 1930s, were no longer enthusiastic about investing in local production. He was also stymied by the fact that the Australian government refused to allow money over a certain amount to be raised for films. In particular, an attempt to raise £160,000 to make two films in collaboration with Ealing Studios, including a version of Robbery Under Arms, was refused government permission.

His short subjects included Can John Braund Cure Cancer? (1948), Fighting Blood (1951), and Overland Adventure (1956).

His last documentary was The Kurnell Story (1957).

== Television ==
In 1956, Hall became the first general manager for Channel Nine in Sydney, where he remained until 1966. There he instigated the practice of showing feature films uncut; previously in Australia they had been cut to fit the television schedules.

== Later years ==
On 1 January 1972, Hall was awarded the Order of the British Empire for his services to the "Australian motion picture industry." The Australian Film Institute recognised his ability to convey the unique Australian character on film, and his important contribution to the development of the Australian film industry, with a Raymond Longford Award for "Lifetime Achievement" in 1976. In 1985, he was inducted into the Logie Hall of Fame. He was a freemason.

Hall was vocal in his criticism of the Australian New Wave, remarking in 1979, "the market for Australian films is flooded with mediocre to weak product. Too many of these films cannot stand up to the competition and will drown." He supported the production of local commercial films, his motto being "Give the audience what they want."

Hall suffered a stroke in 1993. He died in Sydney on 8 February 1994. He wrote an autobiography, Directed by Ken G. Hall (1977), later updated as Australian Film: The Inside Story (1980). His wife since 1925, Irene Addison, had died in 1972. Hall never remarried.

== Legacy ==
In 1995, the ScreenSound Australia (later the National Film and Sound Archive) inaugurated the annual Ken G Hall Film Preservation Award, which was presented by NFSA each year to a person, organisation, or group that had made an outstanding contribution to Australian film preservation. Past winners of the award include Paul Cox, Phillip Noyce, Peter Weir, producers Joan Long and Anthony Buckley, film historian Judy Adamson, Tom Nurse of Kodak Australasia, NFSA archivist and historian Graham Shirley, and ethnographic filmmaker Ian Dunlop (2009).

Stage 3 at Fox Studios in Sydney is named after him.

== Filmography ==
=== Feature films ===
- The Exploits of the Emden (1928)
- On Our Selection (1932)
- The Squatter's Daughter (1933)
- The Silence of Dean Maitland (1934)
- Strike Me Lucky (1934)
- Grandad Rudd (1935)
- Thoroughbred (1936)
- Orphan of the Wilderness (1936)
- It Isn't Done (1937)
- Tall Timbers (1937)
- Lovers and Luggers (1937)
- The Broken Melody (1938)
- Let George Do It (1938)
- Dad and Dave Come to Town (1938)
- Gone to the Dogs (1939)
- Come Up Smiling (1939) (producer only)
- Mr. Chedworth Steps Out (1939)
- Dad Rudd, MP (1940)
- Smithy (1946)

=== Selected short films ===
- Thar She Blows! (1931)
- That's Cricket (1931)
- Cinesound Varieties (1934)
- 100,000 Cobbers (1942)
- Kokoda Front Line! (1942)
- South West Pacific (1943)

== Books ==
- Birthday Book for First National (1927) Ed. Ken G Hall
- Directed by Ken G. Hall (1977)

== Notes ==
- Pike, Andrew Franklin. "The History of an Australian Film Production Company: Cinesound, 1932-70" (PDF). Australian National University.
- Taylor, Philip (January 1974). "Ken G Hall". Cinema Papers. No. 1. pp. 71–91.
