= Mark Angelo =

Canadian river conservationist

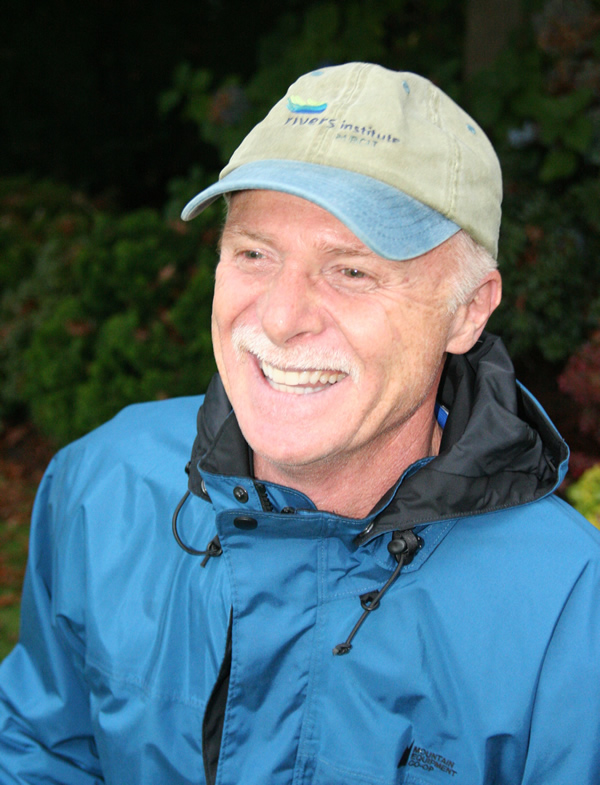
- Born: March 14, 1951 (age 75)
- Occupation: Conservationist
- Spouse: Kathie Angelo
- Children: 2
- Parents: Edmond Angelo (father); Ann Richards (mother)

Mark Angelo, CM OBC (born 14 March 1951) is a Canadian river conservationist, writer, speaker, teacher and paddler. He founded and is the chair of BC Rivers Day and World Rivers Day. In 2009, Angelo was appointed as the inaugural chair of the Rivers Institute at the British Columbia Institute of Technology (BCIT). Prior to that, he was the long-time head of the Fish, Wildlife and Recreation Program at BCIT. Angelo has received the Order of British Columbia and the Order of Canada in recognition of his river conservation efforts. In 2009, he was awarded an honorary doctorate from Simon Fraser University for his river conservation work both locally and globally and in 2019, was the recipient of an honorary doctorate from Trent University for his contributions to protecting global waterways. In 2025, he was awarded an Honorary Doctorate from the British Columbia Institute of Technology. Angelo's river conservation efforts have been the subject of several feature-length films, including the 2016 documentary, RiverBlue, the 2021 film, Last Paddle; 1000 Rivers, 1 Life. and the 2025 documentary, "The Rewilders". He has also authored several books, including “River Magic: Tales from a Life on 1000 Rivers", a compilation of short stories lauded for its conservation themes. Angelo also wrote the acclaimed children's book, "The Little Creek That Could: The Story of a Stream That Came Back to Life", which chronicled the fifty-year effort by Angelo and others to reclaim a damaged waterway.

== Career ==
Angelo graduated from the University of Montana, and then moved to Vancouver, British Columbia.

He was involved in numerous river conservation and restoration initiatives including restoring heavily damaged urban streams such as Guichon Creek in Burnaby and Still Creek in Vancouver. In the early 2000s, he was involved in cleaning up Britannia Creek, which in 2011 saw salmon return for the first time in a century. In September 1980, Angelo organized a major cleanup of the Thompson River in the southern interior of British Columbia. The event later became known as BC Rivers Day. In 2005, Angelo helped set up the World River Day, a now annual event on the final Sunday in September, celebrated by millions people in more than 100 countries.

Angelo has traveled on hundreds of waterways, including the Zambezi, Nile, Mekong, Amazon, and Yangtze. From 2003 to 2007, he hosted the National Geographic on-line program, "Riverworld; a personal journey to the world's wildest rivers"; in 2008, he launched his follow-up program, Wild Water, Wild Earth, with presentations across North America.

In late November 2011, Angelo announced his retirement from full-time work and was honored with the title, Chair Emeritus of the Rivers Institute. In 2012, the City of Burnaby honored Angelo by naming a local city stream, Angelo Creek, after him. In 2014, the 40,000 member BC Wildlife Federation presented Angelo with the Barsby Award, the highest honor their organization can bestow, in recognition of Angelo's lifelong efforts to protect waterways. Angelo was also installed into the Fraser River Hall of Fame at a gala event hosted by the Fraser River Discovery Centre. In 2015, he was named as one of Canada's 100 greatest modern day explorers by Canadian Geographic magazine.

In 2016, the feature film documentary, RiverBlue, chronicled Angelo's three year around-the-world journey by river from 2012 to 2015 during which he uncovered and documented the extensive freshwater pollution impacts of the global fashion industry. The film was praised for its efforts to make the fashion industry more sustainable and ethical. RiverBlue went on to win several international awards including best documentary feature at the United Kingdom's largest independent film festival, Raindance. RiverBlue was also honored at the 2018 World Water Forum in Brasilia, the world's largest water-related gathering, receiving both the AFD Best Film Award and the prestigious Green Drop Award honoring the film from 2017 that best promoted sustainability.

In the fall of 2017, Angelo traveled along the Tijuana River from Mexico into California documenting cross border pollution issues as the lead subject for an ABC news investigative story by ABC 10 news anchor, Kimberly Hunt. While sewage pollution in the river had been previously documented, Angelo's work was among the first to document the extent of toxic industrial pollution plaguing the river, much of it stemming from Tijuana's manufacturing plants of which many are US owned. The news feature subsequently won a 2018 Emmy Award.

In 2021, the feature-length film, Last Paddle; 1000 Rivers, 1 Life, was released. Spanning many countries, the film chronicled Angelo's life-long commitment to river conservation and restoration, including the founding of World Rivers Day. In November of that same year, Angelo was awarded the prestigious Water Warrior Award by the International Water Docs Film Festival in Toronto in recognition of his global efforts to protect rivers.

In late 2021, Angelo published the acclaimed illustrated children's book, The Little Creek That Could; the story of a stream that came back to life. The book is based on the real-life 50-year effort led by Angelo and others to restore and clean-up Burnaby's once severely polluted Guichon Creek. The book was also lauded for its broader message to children about how nature can heal itself if only given a chance.

== Positions ==
Angelo served as a past chair and inaugural member of the Pacific Fisheries Resource Conservation Council. In addition, Angelo also served as the first non-government provincial representative and Chair of the Canadian Heritage Rivers Board. He was also the inaugural Chair of the BC Heritage River System from 1997 to 2001, and from 1998 to 2000, Angelo was chaired the BC Park Legacy Panel. As long time Rivers Chair for the Outdoor Recreation Council of BC, Angelo also coordinated the compilation of BC's annual "most endangered rivers" list from its inception in 1993 to 2018. The compilation of this list, done in concert with the 100,000 member Outdoor Recreation Council of British Columbia, helps provide important profile for a number of key river issues across the Province.

Angelo is a Fellow International member of the New York-based Explorers Club as well as a Fellow of the Royal Canadian Geographical Society.

== Personal life ==
Angelo is the son of Australian born actress Shirley Ann Richards, and Edmond Angelo.
