= Badman's Territory =

1946 film by Tim Whelan

- Theatrical release poster
- Directed by: Tim Whelan
- Written by: Jack Natteford; Luci Ward; Upson Young; Bess Taffel
- Produced by: Nat Holt
- Starring: Randolph Scott; Ann Richards
- Cinematography: Robert de Grasse
- Edited by: Philip Martin Jr.
- Music by: Roy Webb
- Production company: RKO Radio Pictures
- Distributed by: RKO Radio Pictures
- Release date: April 11, 1946 (U.S.)
- Running time: 97-98 mins
- Country: United States
- Language: English

Badman's Territory is a 1946 American Western film starring Randolph Scott. It was followed by the loose sequels Return of the Bad Men (1948) and Best of the Badmen (1951).

== Plot ==
Just north of Texas and west of the Oklahoma border is "Badman's Territory", a region not yet governed by statehood. This is where Jesse James and brother Frank head after a train robbery, along with their partner, Coyote.

Mark Rowley, a lawman, and his deputy brother Johnny are after the James gang. So is a ruthless U.S. marshal named Hampton, who shoots anybody who gets in his way. He even wings Johnny Rowley just to take the newly captured Coyote away from him.

In the town of Quinto, newspaper editor Henryetta Alcott is a crusader for law and order. Mark takes an immediate liking to her. He also helps Belle Starr's horse win a big race.

Johnny's injuries mend, but the Dalton Gang persuades Johnny to go bad and join them. Mark tries to dissuade him. He shoots a man named McGee who stole his horse. Hampton puts up wanted posters on both Rowleys.

Henryetta spreads the word that Oklahoma has annexed this territory into the union. Mark is appointed a "regulator" and proposes marriage to Henryetta before he rides to Coffeyville, Kansas, where the Daltons are about to pull a job with Johnny as part of the gang.

When Johnny is shot and killed, Mark and Coyote bury him in the woods where they overhear Hampton and his men planning to ride to Quinto. After evacuating the town, Rowley meets Hampton and his men alone and is taken into custody. Shortly thereafter, Coyote shows up and is shot by Hampton after refusing to testify against Rowley.

The story ends with Hampton being exposed and Rowley being found not guilty before riding off in a wagon with Henryetta Alcott.

== Goofs ==
Belle Starr died in 1889 under uncertain circumstances. But when the camera zooms in on Henryetta's newspaper the date is 1890.

== Cast ==
- Randolph Scott as Mark Rowley
- George "Gabby" Hayes as Coyote
- Ann Richards as Henryetta Alcott
- Ray Collins as Colonel Farewell
- James Warren as John Rowley
- Morgan Conway as Marshall Bill Hampton
- Virginia Sale as Meg
- John Halloran as Hank McGee
- Andrew Tombes as Doc Grant
- Richard Hale as Ben Wade
- Harry Holman as Hodge
- Chief Thundercloud as Chief Tahlequah
- Lawrence Tierney as Jesse James
- Tom Tyler as Frank James
- Steve Brodie as Bob Dalton
- Phil Warren as Grat Dalton
- William Moss as Bill Dalton
- Nestor Paiva as Sam Bass
- Isabel Jewell as Belle Starr
- Chet Brandenburg as Townsman (uncredited)
- Budd Buster as Doc's Friend (uncredited)
- George Chesebro as Johnny (uncredited)
- Neal Hart as Townsman (uncredited)
- Harry Harvey, Sr. as Stationmaster (uncredited)
- Robert Homans as Judge (uncredited)
- Ben Johnson as Deputy Marshall (uncredited)
- Ethan Laidlaw as Lt. Patton (uncredited)
- Elmo Lincoln as Dick Broadwell (uncredited)
- Theodore Lorch as Citizen's Committee Member (uncredited)
- Wilbur Mack as Cattle Baron (uncredited)
- Kermit Maynard as Carson (uncredited)
- Bud Osborne as Deputy Dan Mercer (uncredited)
- Emory Parnell as Bitter Creek (uncredited)
- 'Snub' Pollard as Town Barber (uncredited)
- Jason Robards, Sr. as Alert Coffeyville Citizen (uncredited)
- Buddy Roosevelt as Lt. Lake (uncredited)
- Harry Semels as Bettor (uncredited)
- Robert J. Wilke as Deputy Marshall (uncredited)

== Production ==
Filming started September 1945.

== Reception ==
Variety said it "had plenty to entertain the adult trade."

The film made a profit of $557,000.

Producer Nat Holt and Randolph Scott later made a similar Western which also featured real life figures in Trail Street.
