= The Woman in the House =

- Directed by: Sammy Lee
- Screenplay by: Warner Law
- Story by: John Nesbitt
- Produced by: John Nesbitt
- Starring: Ann Richards
- Narrated by: John Nesbitt
- Cinematography: Lester White
- Edited by: Harry Komer
- Music by: Lennie Hayton
- Production company: MGM
- Distributed by: MGM
- Release date: 9 May 1942
- Running time: 11 mins
- Country: United States
- Language: English

The Woman in the House is a 1942 American short film directed by Sammy Lee. It was written by Warner Law from a story by John Nesbitt, and produced by MGM as part of the Passing Parade series. An Englishwoman becomes a recluse for forty years.

It was the first American role for Australian film star Ann Richards and led to her being signed to a long-term contract by MGM.

== Premise ==
After the death of her fiancee, a woman develops fear of people and refuses to leave her house until a Nazi air raid happens.

== Cast ==
- John Nesbitt as narrator
- Ann Richards as Catherine Starr
- Mark Daniels as doctor
- Peter Cushing

== Production ==
Richards arrived in the US in early 1942, having left Australia just after the attack on Pearl Harbor. She knew writer Carl Dudley who had written It Isn't Done, Richards' first movie. Through Dudley Richards met producers and agent Leland Hayward which led to her casting in this film. She was given the stage name "Ann Richards" which she kept for the rest of her American career.

The movie was part of a series of shorts made by MGM called John Nesbitt's Passing Parade. During production the film was known as Fear.

== Reception ==
Variety called the film a "Compact dramatic skit... Aside from the unusual character of the yarn, it sinks home the point that 'service to others is the best cure for fear,'... Ranks high on the list of John Nesbitt dramatic pieces. Ann Richards, in femme lead, does a nice Job."
