= Spring Brook (Burnaby) =

Coordinates: 49.264520°N 123.016296°W

Spring Brook is one of many tributaries of Still Creek, an important stream in Burnaby, British Columbia, Canada. It runs north just east of Boundary Road and joins Still Creek just west of Gilmore Station.

The area was once known to Burnaby residents as Broadview. Local old-time residents Margaret and Flora McCallum recall how the children of the neighbourhood waded and played in the creek during hot summers. Local Chinese farmers used the low-lying parts of the creek to cultivate crops of watercress which would be harvested and sold in Vancouver's Chinatown.
