= An American Romance =

1944 film directed by King Vidor

- Directed by: King Vidor
- Written by: Louis Adamic (uncredited)
- Screenplay by: Herbert Dalmas; William Ludwig
- Story by: King Vidor
- Produced by: King Vidor
- Starring: Brian Donlevy; Ann Richards
- Narrated by: Horace McNally
- Cinematography: Harold Rosson
- Edited by: Conrad A. Nervig
- Music by: Louis Gruenberg; Nathaniel Shilkret (uncredited)
- Production company: Metro-Goldwyn-Mayer
- Distributed by: Loew's Inc.
- Release dates: October 11, 1944 (Cincinnati, Ohio); November 12, 1944 (New York City); December 14, 1944 (Los Angeles)
- Running time: 121 minutes (existing print); 151 minutes (copyright length)
- Country: United States
- Language: English
- Budget: $2.4 million

An American Romance is a 1944 American epic drama film directed and produced by King Vidor, who also wrote the screen story. Shot in Technicolor, the film stars Brian Donlevy and Ann Richards and is narrated by Horace McNally. The film is also known as The American Miracle.

== Plot ==
Stefan Dangosbiblicek, a Czech immigrant, arrives at Ellis Island in the 1890s and walks to the Mesabi Iron Range, where he joins his cousin Anton working in the open-pit ore mines. He is renamed "Steve Dangos" by a foreman. In the Iron Range, he meets Anna, a teacher, whom he woos and eventually marries.

Through hazardous, hard work and study, Steve becomes a foreman at an Ohio steel plant, and his family grows and prospers. He buys an automobile, and is frustrated by its poor performance. He rebuilds it with the help of Howard Clinton, a teacher at his son's high school, but their efforts end in failure when he and Howard are seriously injured in a crash. His eldest son and Howard's pupil, George Washington Dangos, dies after enlisting to fight in World War I. Steve fulfills his son's wish that he become an American citizen, and moves to Detroit to sell his design for a safer car to an established auto company. However, no company wants to start producing their design, seeing it as a risky investment. Steve and Howard strike out on their own, founding the Danton Motor Car Corporation with capital gathered from friends and relatives. It proves to be a great success. Steve's youngest son Theodore Roosevelt Dangos, a recent engineering graduate, goes to work for Danton, and rather than join the executive ranks he starts at the "bottom" and becomes involved in union activities.

With Teddy's help, the workers in the auto plant organize, initiating a lengthy strike for better pay and conditions. Steve strongly opposes the unionization effort, citing his own experience and work ethic, but when a motion to approve cooperation with the union is brought to the board of directors, his attempt to stop the union is rejected, including by Howard and Anton. He retires, resentful of his son and colleagues. He finally embarks on a long-promised Californian honeymoon with Anna, but remains distracted by his failure in the boardroom. News that the company is opening a plane factory in California confuses him. However, the entry of the United States into World War II reinvigorates him, and he returns to his business. When other leaders in the company are doubtful of Danton's ability to meet warplane manufacturing quotas, Steve rousingly affirms his belief that they can meet and exceed expectations, as they always have.

The film is interspersed with documentary footage, and concludes with B-17s Flying Fortreses being built at Douglas Aircraft factory.

== Cast ==
- Brian Donlevy as Stefan Dangosbiblicek/Steve Dangos
- Ann Richards as Anna O'Rourke Dangos
- Walter Abel as Howard Clinton
- John Qualen as Anton Dubechek
- Horace McNally as Teddy Roosevelt Dangos/Narrator
- Mary McLeod as Tina Dangos
- Bob Lowell as George Dangos
- Fred Brady as Abraham Lincoln Dangos
- Billy Lechner as Joe Chandler, Jr.
- Jerry Shane as Bob Chandler
- Harold Landon as Joe
- J. M. Kerrigan as Charlie O'Rourke

== Production ==
The film was part of a trilogy directed and produced by King Vidor consisting of war, wheat and steel. His films on war and wheat were The Big Parade (1925) and Our Daily Bread (1934). This was to be his steel industry epic film.

Vidor came up with the story which he proposed to Eddie Mannix. Vidor then sent a telegram to author Louis Adamic, who wrote on the topic of immigration and labor. A The screenplay was ultimately credited to Herbert Dalmas and William Ludwig, representing a long list of contributing writers, including John Fante, and alternate titles.

Vidor says the lead character was inspired by immigrants such as Andrew Carnegie, Charles Proteus Steinmetz, William S. Knudsen and Walter Chrysler.

The film's working titles were America, This Is America, An American Story, American Miracle and The Magic Land.

Vidor said "This project was a big love of mine for many years, I had many ideas: from the earth up into the air—lift—and doing it by colour, by the development and use of color. And then it was the earth, the heavy earth, iron ore, getting more refined, more refined, until it finally flew into the sky as an airplane, you see, and only up, and it was all of America."

Vidor initially wanted to cast Spencer Tracy as Steve Dangos, Ingrid Bergman as Anna and Joseph Cotten as the lead character's friend Howard Clinton. All three were unavailable, so cast in their place were Brian Donlevy as Dangos and Walter Abel as Howard Clinton. "I wasn't enough politician to be up front at the lunchroom and I got secondary casting," he said. However in his memoirs he said he tested both Donlevy and Richards and "they came up surprisingly well. They were made up and tested in all the various ages from youth to full maturity called for in the script, and they gave performances of striking conviction."

Vidor later said that he felt that Donlevy was miscast as Steve Dangos because he was known for playing "blunt and blustering" characters.

Frances Gifford and Ann Sothern were reportedly considered for the role of Anna but Australian actress Ann Richards was chosen after principal photography began in April 1943. Vidor said Richards was "a girl they wanted to develop" and that he justified it to himself as he was a "company man" who had been on salary without working for a year.

Vidor used several different locations for exterior and industrial shots. He shot footage of factories and mines in Hibbing, Minnesota, the dock in Duluth, Minnesota and the Ford River A&O Rouge Plant in Dearborn, Michigan. Atmosphere and background shots were filmed in Lake Superior. Additional industrial shots of the Carnegie Illinois Steel Works factory in Chicago and the Indiana Steel Plant in Gary, Indiana were also filmed. For a racing scene, Vidor used footage filmed at the Indianapolis 500 in Speedway, Indiana. Other scenes were filmed at the Chrysler automobile factory in Detroit, the Consolidated Plant in San Diego and the Douglas Aircraft Company in Long Beach, California. Vidor also recalled filming in Wilmington, California. Background footage of a blast furnace used in the film was shot in Irontown, Utah.

An American Romance took fifteen months to complete and its final budget totaled at $3,000,000.

== Reception ==
The film was shown at a preview screening in Inglewood, California. The original cut was 151 minutes which Louis B. Mayer praised but still chose to remove thirty minutes after complaints from theater managers that the film was too long. It is unknown if the removed footage still survives.

Vidor was not happy with the cuts as he felt they hurt the story.

An American Romance made its world premiere in Cincinnati, Ohio on October 11, 1944, opened in New York City on November 12, 1944, and in Los Angeles on December 13, 1944. The film received mixed reviews and was a financial failure. King Vidor refused to work for MGM again. He later wrote about the film in his 1953 autobiography A Tree Is a Tree:

I was determined to tell the story of steel from the viewpoint of an eager immigrant in 'An American Romance' ... When the picture was previewed in Inglewood, Louis B. Mayer came to me on the sidewalk in front of the theater, put his arm around my shoulders and said, 'I've just seen the greatest picture our company ever made'. However, an order came from the New York office to cut half an hour. They cut the human elements of the story instead of the documentary sections, explaining that this was the only way a half hour could be taken out without complications in the musical soundtrack. In other words, the film was edited according to the soundtrack and not according to the inherent story values. At the lowest emotional level I have reached since I have been on Hollywood, I went to my office, packed up and moved out of the studio. The picture was not a box office success. Many of the inhabitants of Hollywood and Beverly Hills have never seen the film and many do not even know it was made. I spent 3 years of my life on the project and MGM spent close to $3,000,000.

King Vidor later said:

The picture was spoilt for me by Brian Donlevy and by the girl (Ann Richards), who was not very exciting, and by the cutting. I took a lot out of it, and then the studio cut it against my wishes, taking out things that 1 didn't think should be cut and leaving in things that could have been cut. Also, to avoid re-dubbing and re-doing the music, they cut by where the music ended, and that was just ruinous. The other thing was, I had it very heavy on the documentary side, and when I went out on the road with it in the Middle West I discovered that we should keep all the human story and cut down more on the documentary story. But in the cutting they did the reverse: they cut the human story and kept all the documentary stuff So that's when I left M-G-M and never went back.

Vidor later reflected "Donlevy gives a fine performance but as a star he does not symbolize that intangible element that would have lifted the role to greatness." Writer William Ludwig said "It was a fabulous picture at about four and a half hours" but "it was cut in half, to two hours and seven minutes. One whole enormous sequence I had to take out and make it an announcement on the radio. It doesn't give you much left to work with. But King was a great director."

MGM recorded a loss of $1.7 million on the film.

In February 2020, the film was shown at the 70th Berlin International Film Festival, as part of a retrospective dedicated to King Vidor's career.

== See also ==
- List of American films of 1944

== Notes ==
- Vidor, King (1953). A Tree Is a Tree: An Autobiography. S. French. ISBN 0-573-60602-1.
