= Don't Call Me Girlie =

Don't Call Me Girlie is a 1985 documentary about women in the Australian film industry in the 1920s and 1930s. There was an accompanying book, Brilliant Careers, by Andree Wright.

The title is taken from a line spoken by Shirley Ann Richards in Dad and Dave Come to Town (1938).

== Cast ==
- Aileen Britton
- Charlotte Francis
- Nancy Gurr
- Jean Hatton
- Jocelyn Howarth
- Louise Lovely
- Lottie Lyell
- McDonagh Sisters
- Marjorie Osborne
- Shirley Ann Richards
- Helen Twelvetrees
- Penne Hackforth-Jones as Narrator
