= Breakdown (1952 film) =

1952 American feature film directed by Edmond Angelo

- Theatrical release poster
- Directed by: Edmond Angelo
- Written by: Robert Abel
- Based on: The Samson Slasher, a play by Robert Abel
- Produced by: Edmond Angelo
- Starring: Ann Richards; William Bishop; Anne Gwynne
- Cinematography: Paul Ivano
- Edited by: Robert M. Leeds
- Music by: Paul Dunlap
- Production company: Pegasus Productions
- Distributed by: Realart Pictures Inc.
- Release date: July 16, 1952 (United States)
- Running time: 76 minutes
- Country: United States
- Language: English

Breakdown (also known as Decision) is a 1952 American crime film noir directed by Edmond Angelo and starring Ann Richards, William Bishop and Anne Gwynne.

== Plot ==
Framed for murder, heavyweight boxer Terry Williams is sent to prison, but he is released after several years on good behavior. He becomes a championship contender and on the eve of the big fight, finds the man who can prove that he was framed for the crime for which he served time.

== Cast ==
- Ann Richards as June Hannum
- William Bishop as Terry Williams
- Anne Gwynne as Candy Allen
- Sheldon Leonard as Nick Samson
- Wally Cassell as Pete Samson
- Richard Benedict as Punchy
- Joe McTurk as Longshot McGinnis
- John Vosper as Judge Sam Hannum
- Roy Engel as Al Bell
- Norman Rainey as Doc
- Hal Baylor as Joe Thompson
- Elena Sirangelo as Mrs. Prescott
- Gene Covelli as Gumbo, the newsboy
- Michelle King as Girl in Audience
- Al Cantor as Joe DeVito

== Production ==
Ann Richards was the wife of the film's director Edmond Angelo. She had retired from showbusiness three years earlier to raise her children and returned to permanent retirement after appearing in Breakdown.

Filming began on December 1, 1951 at Republic Studios and lasted for 11 days.

== Reception ==
Variety called Breakdown a "so-so secondary action-meller of only spotty entertainment values".
