= RiverBlue =

2017 documentary film about pollution from the fashion industry

- Film poster
- Directed by: David McIlvride and Roger Williams
- Produced by: Roger Williams and Lisa Mazzotta
- Narrated by: Jason Priestley
- Release date: April 3, 2017 (Cleveland)
- Country: Canada
- Language: English

RiverBlue is a 2017 documentary film that chronicles a three-year, around-the-world river journey by paddler and conservationist Mark Angelo during which he uncovered and documented the pollution impacts of the global fashion industry. The explores the fashion sector, from denim to leather to fast fashion, as one of the world's most polluting industries.

== Reception ==
RiverBlue was screened in theaters and film festivals around the world won several international awards, including the 2017 Best Documentary Feature at the Raindance Film Festival. The film was also honored at the 2018 World Water Forum in Brasilia, where it was presented with the AFD Best Film Award (sponsored by the French Development Agency) and the Green Drop Award honoring the film from 2017 that best promoted sustainability.
