= Ann Richards (actress) =

Australian actress (1917–2006)

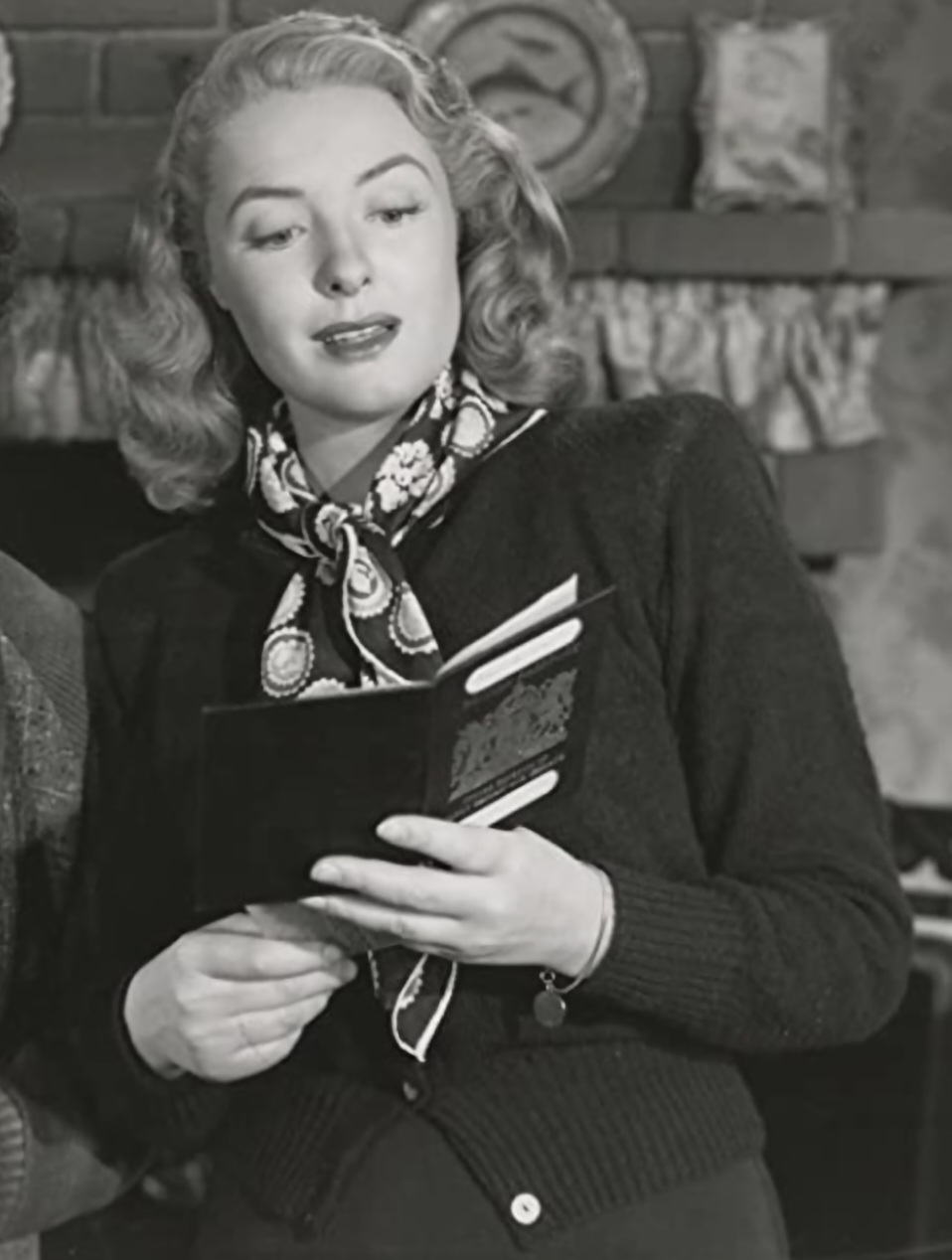
- Richards in Lost Honeymoon (1947)
- Born: Shirley Ann Richards; 13 December 1917; Sydney, Australia
- Died: 25 August 2006 (aged 88); Torrance, California, U.S.
- Occupation: Actress
- Years active: 1937–1960
- Spouse: Edmond Angelo (m. 1949; died 1983)
- Children: Juliet, Christopher, Mark

Shirley Ann Richards (13 December 1917 – 25 August 2006) was an Australian actress and author who achieved notability in a series of 1930s Australian films for Ken G. Hall before moving to the United States, where she continued her career as a film actress, mainly as a Metro-Goldwyn-Mayer starlet. Her best known performances were in It Isn't Done (1937), Dad and Dave Come to Town (1938), An American Romance (1944), and Sorry, Wrong Number (1948). In the 1930s, she was the only Australian actor under a long-term contract to a film studio, Cinesound Productions. She subsequently became a lecturer and poet.

== Life and career ==
=== Early life ===
She was born Shirley Ann Richards in Sydney, Australia, to an American father (d. 10 August 1928) and New Zealand mother, and was raised in the suburb of Mosman and educated at Ascham School, Edgecliff.

Richards began acting on stage in amateur productions for the Sydney Players Club and worked as a receptionist at the photographic studio of Russell Roberts.

== Cinesound ==
Richards was spotted in an amateur theatre production when selected for Cinesound Productions' Talent School, where she worked for six months. This led to her casting as Cecil Kellaway's daughter in It Isn't Done (1937) for director Ken G. Hall at Cinesound Productions.

Richards was a success with the public and critics, and Stuart F. Doyle, head of Cinesound, ordered Hall to put her under long-term contract so she would not be poached by a rival filmmaker such as F. W. Thring or Charles Chauvel. Hall later said, "I think that Shirley Ann would be the only artist before or since to be placed under term contract by an Australian film company." The contract was for 12 months with options.

"In Shirley Ann Richards I believe we have the ideal ingenue", said Hall at the time. "She is young, intelligent, photographs splendidly, and above all, responds quickly to direction. Her work in this film with a cast of famous professional players, headed by Cecil Kellaway, has astonished us all. She has great self possession, and yet her strongest appeal is her youthful freshness and feminine charm."

Hall used Richards in his next film, the logging adventure Tall Timbers (1937) where she romanced Frank Leighton. Filmink claimed it is implied their characters have pre-marital sex and "Richards was always very good at playing flirtatious good girls with a twinkle in the eye."

She was the female lead in another adventure saga for Hall, Lovers and Luggers (1937), playing opposite American import Lloyd Hughes who was twice her age. She famously appeared in men's clothing in her initial appearance in the film.

Richards' third film for Hall was playing the daughter of Bert Bailey in Dad and Dave Come to Town (1938) which has been called her best part. She did not appear in Mr Chedworth Steps Out which has been called a mistake. Richards' final Australian feature was Come Up Smiling (1939), supporting Will Mahoney and directed by William Freshman, though produced by Hall. Filmink called her "wasted in her nothing part" in the movie.

In 1939 she starred in a radio serial All That Glitters. In 1940, she appeared on stage in a production of Charley's Aunt at the Minerva Theatre. She also appeared in stage productions of The Ghost Train and Are You a Mason.

The following year, she appeared in her final Australian film, the war-time featurette 100,000 Cobbers (1942), directed by Hall.

== American film career ==
Richards left Australia for Hollywood on 11 December, only a few days after the attack on Pearl Harbor in December 1941. She arrived with only $75, all that the government would allow her to take out of the country.

"I was prepared to do lectures or radio work if necessary", she later said.

Ken G. Hall had sent on some film featuring her to Carl Dudley, an American-based writer who had worked on the script for It Isn't Done and with whom Richards was to stay when he arrived, but he gave it to an aspiring producer who lost it. Nonetheless, Dudley invited introduced her to Roy Meyers of the Leland Hayward Agency.

=== MGM ===
Within her first week in Hollywood, Richards was cast in a short, The Woman in the House (1942), which led to a contract with Metro-Goldwyn-Mayer. The studio saw her as a "young Greer Garson".

"I had an angel on my shoulder", she said later. "The studio respected my Australian credits and treated me like a star, but they cast me as 'Ann Richards', saying 'Shirley Ann, sounded too much like a Southern belle'". (Another reason was to avoid confusion with the actress Anne Shirley.)

In June 1942 she was given a small role in Random Harvest (1942) with Ronald Colman and Greer Garson. According to Richards, producer Sidney Franklin told her if she had "come to the lot earlier" she would have gotten the role of Colman's fiancée, played by Susan Peters, as that part "is supposed to remind him of his first love, Greer Garson, whom you resemble much more than Susan does." (In Australia, Richards had gone to school with the daughters of Colman's brother Eric.)

This was followed by a part in Three Hearts for Julia ("I had very little to do but it was interesting"), and then a supporting role as an Australian nurse in Dr. Gillespie's New Assistant (1942).

In April 1943 she was given the most prestigious role of her career: the female lead in An American Romance (1944), a big-budget production from director King Vidor starring Brian Donlevy. Vidor had hoped to cast Ingrid Bergman who was unavailable. "They had this girl named Ann Richards who they were hoping would take the place of Greer Garson," he said. "They asked me to make tests of her and she made excellent tests. I considered it quite a compromise."

News of Richards' casting reached her parents in Australia half an hour before she received a telegraph from the army that their son Roderick, Richards' brother, was a POW in Borneo. However, the film ended up spending a lot of time in post-production and received mixed reviews when released. MGM recorded a loss on the film and Vidor refused to work for MGM again.

Richards tested for None But the Lonely Heart at RKO but lost it to June Duprez. She said she was promised parts in Gaslight and The Picture of Dorian Gray but did not get them.

MGM was unsure what to do with Richards. "I loved MGM – except for the waiting – there were long periods when I wasn't being used", she commented later. Richards said the breaking point came when MGM refused to loan her out for the part played by Laraine Day in Cecil B. de Mille's film The Story of Dr Wassell. "I felt that if I could get away from MGM I could do more things," she said. She asked to be released from her contract.

=== Hal Wallis and RKO ===
In April 1944 Richards signed with RKO, who had been impressed by her None But the Lonely Heart test, to make two films a year.

She received offers to sign with David O. Selznick and Hal B. Wallis, and decided to go with Wallis believing he would be more likely to use her than Selznick. In July 1944 Wallis announced he would put her in Love Letters and The Searching Wind. She said, "I always wanted to be a free lance and now it looks like I'm a free lance and a contract player... isn't it wonderful?"

Wallis scheduled her to star opposite Barry Sullivan in Love Letters (1945). However, he then changed his mind and chose to use Jennifer Jones and Joseph Cotten in the lead roles; Richards was given a supporting part. "It was a very good part," she said.

Ken Hall wanted her for Smithy back in Australia but she was unable to accept.

Wallis announced he would star Richards in an adaptation of the novel The Crying Sisters written by Ayn Rand and directed by Byron Haskin. However the film was not made.

RKO renewed their option on her in April 1945. They announced they would put her in None So Blind with Charles Bickford and Joan Bennett. It was eventually made without her as The Woman on the Beach.

Instead she supported Randolph Scott in Badman's Territory (1946). That year in an interview she said she thought her British sounding accent might have held her back in Hollywood. Wallis gave her the lead role in The Searching Wind (1946) with Robert Young, but the film was not successful. In October 1946 Wallis announced Richards would make Paid in Full from a script by Robert Blees but the film was never made. In 1947 she appeared in The Astonished Heart at La Jolla Playhouse alongside Dorothy McGuire.

=== Eagle-Lion ===
Richards then appeared in two movies for Eagle-Lion, Lost Honeymoon and Love from a Stranger. She then had the third lead in a popular film for Wallis Sorry, Wrong Number (1948). "I enjoyed working for Hal Wallis very much," she said leter. "He was a marvelous producer. He was very interested. Some people complained that he came down to the set too often, irritating the directors, but I thought he was correct: he wasn’t there to criticize but because of his interest."

In 1948 she was announced for a play Recessional by William Hurbert. Edmund Angelo bought the rights.

In April 1948 she told the Los Angeles Times she was determined to play younger parts as opposed to the more mature ones she had been doing.

In February 1949 it was reported that Byron Haskin was trying to get her to star in The Scarlet Empress to be shot in Mexico.

In 1949, it was reported she was trying to get up a film called Michelle as an independent producer.

=== Edmond Angelo ===
Richards retired in 1949 following her marriage to electronics engineer Edmond Angelo.

Angelo ran a successful consulting company and Richards and he raised three children together, Christopher, Mark, and Juliet.

In October 1951 it was announced she would make a film with Angelo, The Slasher, then do a play directed by him, Personal Triumph by Arthur Alsburg. There was also going to be a second film, You're So Dangerous, where Richards would play a social worker mistaken for a gangster's moll.

Eventually Richards appeared in The Slasher, produced and directed by her husband, which was retitled Breakdown (1952). The film was not a success and Richards appeared in no further dramatic films. Angelo decided to make no further films.

=== Later years ===
After her retirement, Richards ventured into painting and poetry, publishing several well-received volumes, including The Grieving Senses (1971) and Odyssey for Edmond (1991). She also wrote the verse play Helen of Troy in the 1970s, which Angelo and she presented on college campuses. They remained married until Angelo's death in 1983. Richards died in Torrance, California, on 24 August 2006.

Richards had a brother who was killed in a Japanese prisoner of war camp during World War II.

== Richards and Australia ==
While in Hollywood, Richards often appeared at functions promoting Australian interests.

Richards attended the conference establishing the United Nations in San Francisco in 1945.

She returned to Australia in 1946 for a well-publicised holiday. She took back a pair of wicketkeeping gloves belonging to Bert Oldfield to C. Aubrey Smith in Hollywood.

== Appraisal ==
Writer Tom Vallance said of Richards, "soft-spoken and sincere, she was at her best when conveying depths of wisdom, with a suggestion of passion stoically controlled." Author Stephen Vagg argued she "had an appeal similar to that of the young Olivia de Havilland – she looked like a good girl, but there was always a twinkle in the eye; virginal but with the promise of a lively honeymoon."

== Filmography ==
=== Australian films ===
- It Isn't Done (1937) as Patricia Blaydon
- Tall Timbers (1937) as Joan Burbridge
- Lovers and Luggers (1937) as Lorna Quidley
- Dad and Dave Come to Town (1938) as Jill
- Come Up Smiling (1939) as Eve Cameron
- 100,000 Cobbers (1942, Short) as Catherine Starr

=== US films ===
- The Woman in the House (1942, Short)
- Dr. Gillespie's New Assistant (1942) as Iris Headley
- Random Harvest (1942) as Bridget
- Three Hearts for Julia (1943) as Clara (uncredited)
- An American Romance (1944) as Anna O'Rourke Dangos
- Love Letters (1945) as Dilly Carson
- Badman's Territory (1946) as Henryetta Alcott
- The Searching Wind (1946) as Emily Taney Hazen
- Lost Honeymoon (1947) as Amy Atkins / Tillie Gray
- Love from a Stranger (1947) as Mavis Wilson
- Sorry, Wrong Number (1948) as Sally Hunt Lord
- Breakdown (1952) as June Hannum

=== Documentaries ===
- Don't Call Me Girlie (1984, documentary) as herself

=== Unmade film ===
- His Bridal Night (1946) – with Dennis O'Keefe – the cast transferred over to Lost Honeymoon

=== Theatre ===
- The Last of Mrs Cheyney (1936) – amateur production in Sydney
- Haunted Houses (1936) – Sydney Players Club, St James Hall, Sydney
- Charley's Aunt (1940) – Minerva Theatre, Sydney
- Tonight at 8.30 by Noël Coward (1947) – Actors' Company, La Jolla

=== Radio ===
- All that Glitters (1939)
- Rookery Nook (1941)

== Notes ==
- McClelland, Doug (1992). Forties film talk : oral histories of Hollywood, with 120 lobby posters.
