= Love Letters (1945 film) =

1945 film by William Dieterle

- Promotional poster
- Directed by: William Dieterle
- Screenplay by: Ayn Rand
- Based on: Pity My Simplicity; 1944 novel by Christopher Massie
- Produced by: Hal B. Wallis
- Starring: Jennifer Jones; Joseph Cotten; Ann Richards; Cecil Kellaway; Gladys Cooper; Anita Louise
- Cinematography: Lee Garmes
- Edited by: Anne Bauchens
- Music by: Victor Young
- Production company: Hal Wallis Productions
- Distributed by: Paramount Pictures
- Release date: October 26, 1945
- Running time: 101 minutes
- Country: United States
- Language: English

Love Letters is a 1945 American romantic film noir directed by William Dieterle from a screenplay by Ayn Rand, based on the novel Pity My Simplicity by Christopher Massie. It stars Jennifer Jones, Joseph Cotten, Ann Richards, Cecil Kellaway, Gladys Cooper and Anita Louise. In Italy, during World War II, Alan writes eloquent letters for his fellow soldier, Roger, to Victoria—who falls in love with the letters. Roger marries Victoria and then dies. Gravely wounded, Alan eventually returns home and meets Victoria, now suffering from amnesia and going by the name of Singleton. She is suspected of Roger's murder.

The film was nominated for four Academy Awards, including a Best Actress in a Leading Role nomination for Jones.

== Plot ==
Alan Quinton, an American soldier in Italy during World War II, has been writing letters for his friend, Roger Morland, a man who admits he "never had any standards, manners or taste." Alan has never met Victoria Remington, but regards her as a "pin-up girl of the spirit," to whom he can express feelings he has never expressed in person. He realizes that Victoria has fallen in love with the letters and is concerned that she will be disappointed by the real Roger, who abruptly leaves for paratrooper training in England (and to see Victoria when on leave) after Alan tells him this.

Alan is subsequently injured on the Italian front and finds out that Roger is dead. He is having trouble readjusting to civilian life and spending time with his fiancée, Helen Wentworth. He decides to live at his aunt's farm in Essex. In London, his brother takes him to a party at which he meets Dilly Carson and a woman who introduces herself as Singleton. He drunkenly tells them the story of the letters and falling in love with a woman he's never met, and Dilly realizes he is referring to Victoria. She tells Alan that a murder was committed and the letters were somehow involved.

Alan and his fiancée realize they aren't in love and part amicably before he moves to the farm. While in Essex, Alan sees a sign for Longreach — the address of the farm where he sent all the letters — and visits the house, where he is told that Victoria died over a year ago. He also learns that Roger was murdered by his wife, and Alan feels guilty for ever writing the letters. Back in London, Dilly informs him that Singleton is suffering from amnesia and is actually Victoria. She begs him not to tell Singleton that he wrote the letters because Victoria fell in love with Roger through the letters and married him based on them.

Dilly recounts that one day, she found Roger stabbed to death in the country house on Longreach; however, Victoria was completely unable to remember what happened, even though she was holding the murder weapon right beside him. After a trial during which she cannot remember anything, she is sent to a prison psychiatric hospital for a year and then released into the care of Dilly. Victoria never regained her memory, and continues to now live as Singleton, her original name as a foundling. Singleton believes that Alan is in love with Victoria, but does not realize Victoria is actually herself. Nevertheless, Alan and Singleton marry after he gets permission from her adoptive mother, Beatrice Remington. Their marriage is troubled, however, by Alan's love of whom Singleton believes is another woman.

Beatrice returns to the farm and Singleton is drawn by her suppressed memories during a drive in the country to visit Longreach and the farm. Conversing with Beatrice, Singleton begins to remember the events of that fateful night: Victoria and an inebriated Roger argue as Victoria rereads the letters to remind herself of the man she loves and not the bitter man with her now. Roger reveals that he is not the one who wrote the letters, and he becomes abusive, striking her. Beatrice takes a knife and stabs him to death as Victoria tries to save the letters he had thrown into the fireplace.

As Alan arrives at the house, Victoria recalls her true identity and realizes that Alan was the one who wrote the letters. Then they passionately kiss.

== Cast ==
- Jennifer Jones as Singleton / Victoria Morland
- Joseph Cotten as Alan Quinton
- Ann Richards as Dilly Carson
- Cecil Kellaway as Mac
- Gladys Cooper as Beatrice Remington
- Anita Louise as Helen Wentworth
- Robert Sully as Roger Morland
- Reginald Denny as Defense counsel Phillips
- Ernest Cossart as Bishop
- Byron Barr as Derek Quinton

== Adaptation and production ==
The movie was one of the first produced by Hal Wallis, who had recently left his position as head of production at Warner to become a producer with Paramount.

Rand's screenplay adaptation of Massie's book was also influenced by Edmond Rostand's famous play Cyrano de Bergerac. Rand had admired the work since reading it in the original French in her youth. As in Rostand's play, the heroine falls in love with a soldier believing him to be the author of certain love letters that had been written for him by another soldier, including a moving note sent from the front. In Rand's version, a dimension of psychological mystery is added, and the heroine discovers the identity of the true author in time for the protagonists to experience a "happy ending."

Love Letters is the second of four films that featured both Jones and Cotten in leading roles. The others are Since You Went Away (1944), Duel in the Sun (1946), and Portrait of Jennie (1948).

Hal Wallis had to borrow the services of Jones and Cotten from David O. Selznick who had both actors under personal contract (along with director William Dieterle). Cotten was Wallis' second choice, after his first choice, Gregory Peck, turned down the film for being too close to Spellbound. Wallis said Selznick was difficult to deal with and tried to exert control over the film.

Ann Richards had recently been put under contract to Wallis. She and Barry Sullivan tested for the leads and for a moment it looked like they might play them but Wallis decided to cast more established stars. Richards was cast in the second female lead role.

Filming started October 1944 and ended by 1 January.

== Music ==
The musical score by Victor Young was nominated for an Oscar, and featured the melody of the hit song "Love Letters". The first notable release of the song, with lyrics by Edward Heyman, was by vocalist Dick Haymes whose recording peaked in popularity in September 1945. The song has been recorded by numerous artists since 1945, including Ketty Lester, Alison Moyet, Rosemary Clooney, Nat King Cole, Elvis Presley, Jack Jones, Elton John, Del Shannon, and Sinéad O'Connor, among others. The melody or song has been used in other films, including the David Lynch film Blue Velvet (1986), which features the Ketty Lester version.

== Reception ==
Although critical reviews were mostly negative, Love Letters succeeded at the box office. New York Times reviewer Bosley Crowther berated it as "sentimental twaddle", calling Jones' performance "fatuous", Rand's writing "a mucky muddle", and Dieterle's direction "mushy and pretentious".

The Chicago Tribune was indifferent: “This is one of those ‘depends’ pictures — meaning that liking it is a matter of personal taste. Incurable romantics will probably eat it up; others may have a very different reaction. ... No one in the film talks like a human being — every one philosophizes all over the place, even the old handyman, coyly known as ‘the gargoyle.’ Maybe I just ain’t erudite, and don't appreciate that life isn't a burden, etc., but except for rare moments, I found ‘Love Letters’ a distinct bore.

=== Accolades ===
The film was nominated in several categories at the 18th Academy Awards:

- Best Actress: Jennifer Jones
- Best Art Direction (Black-and-White): Art Direction: Hans Dreier, Roland Anderson; Interior Decoration: Sam Comer, Ray Moyer
- Music (Score of a Dramatic or Comedy Picture): Victor Young
- Academy Award for Best Original Song: "Love Letters," Music by Victor Young; Lyrics by Eddie Heyman
