= The Searching Wind =

1946 film by William Dieterle

- Directed by: William Dieterle
- Screenplay by: Lillian Hellman
- Based on: The Searching Wind; 1944 play by Lillian Hellman
- Produced by: Hal Wallis
- Starring: Robert Young; Sylvia Sidney; Ann Richards
- Cinematography: Lee Garmes
- Edited by: Warren Low
- Music by: Victor Young
- Production company: Hal Wallis Productions
- Distributed by: Paramount Pictures
- Release date: August 9, 1946
- Running time: 108 minutes
- Country: United States
- Language: English

The Searching Wind is a 1946 American drama film directed by William Dieterle and starring Robert Young, Sylvia Sidney, and Ann Richards. It is based on the play of the same name by Lillian Hellman. It had originally been planned for producer Hal Wallis to make the film at Warner Bros., but after he left the studio he brought the project to Paramount Pictures.

== Plot ==
In 1945, after hearing of the death of Mussolini, an American career diplomat and his family reflect on his mistakes he made during the interwar years.

== Cast ==
- Robert Young as Alex Hazen
- Sylvia Sidney as Cassie Bowman
- Ann Richards as Emily Hazen
- Dudley Digges as Moses
- Douglas Dick as Sam Hazen
- Albert Basserman as Count Von Stammer
- Dan Seymour as Torrone
- Ian Wolfe as Sears
- Marietta Canty as Sophronia
- Norma Varden as Mrs. Hayworth
- Charles D. Brown as Carter
- Don Castle as David
- William Trenk as Ponette
- Mickey Kuhn as Sam as a Boy

== Original play ==
Hellman's play debuted on Broadway in 1944 and ran for 318 performances. Montgomery Clift was in the original cast which was directed by Herman Shumlin.

Hellman later said it was "The nearest thing to a political play" she had written "which is probably why I don't like it much any more. But even there I meant only to write about nice, well born people who, with good intentions, helped to sell out a world."

=== Opening Night Cast ===
- Edgar Andrews as First Waiter
- Montgomery Clift as Samuel Hazen
- Joe De Santis as Second Waiter
- Dudley Digges as Moses Taney
- Eugene Earl as James Sears
- Mercedes Gilbert as Sophronia
- Alfred Hesse as Ponette
- Dennis King as Alexander Hazen
- Walter Kohler as Hotel Manager
- Arnold Korff as Count Max von Stammer
- Eric Latham as Edward Halsey
- Barbara O'Neil as Catherine Bowman
- William F. Schoeller as Eppler
- Cornelia Otis Skinner as Emily Hazen

== Production ==
Hal Wallis bought the screen rights for $100,000. Wallis had made a film of Hellman's Watch on the Rhine while head of Warner Bros. Hellman did the script. It was one of the first films Wallis made as a producer at Paramount.

Richards' casting was announced in September 1944. Joseph Cotten turned down the male lead.

Filming started 13 December 1945.

== Reception ==
Variety thought the film "isn't likely to hold the run-of-the-mill entertainment-goer looking for escapist stuff" and "should earn back its coin... for though well-mounted, it nevertheless doesn't appear too heavily budgeted. The film is an improvement on the Broadway play... because it is more coherent, and better acted."

== Bibliography ==
- Dick, Bernard F. Hal Wallis: Producer to the Stars. University Press of Kentucky, 2015.
