= Lost Honeymoon =

1947 film by Leigh Jason

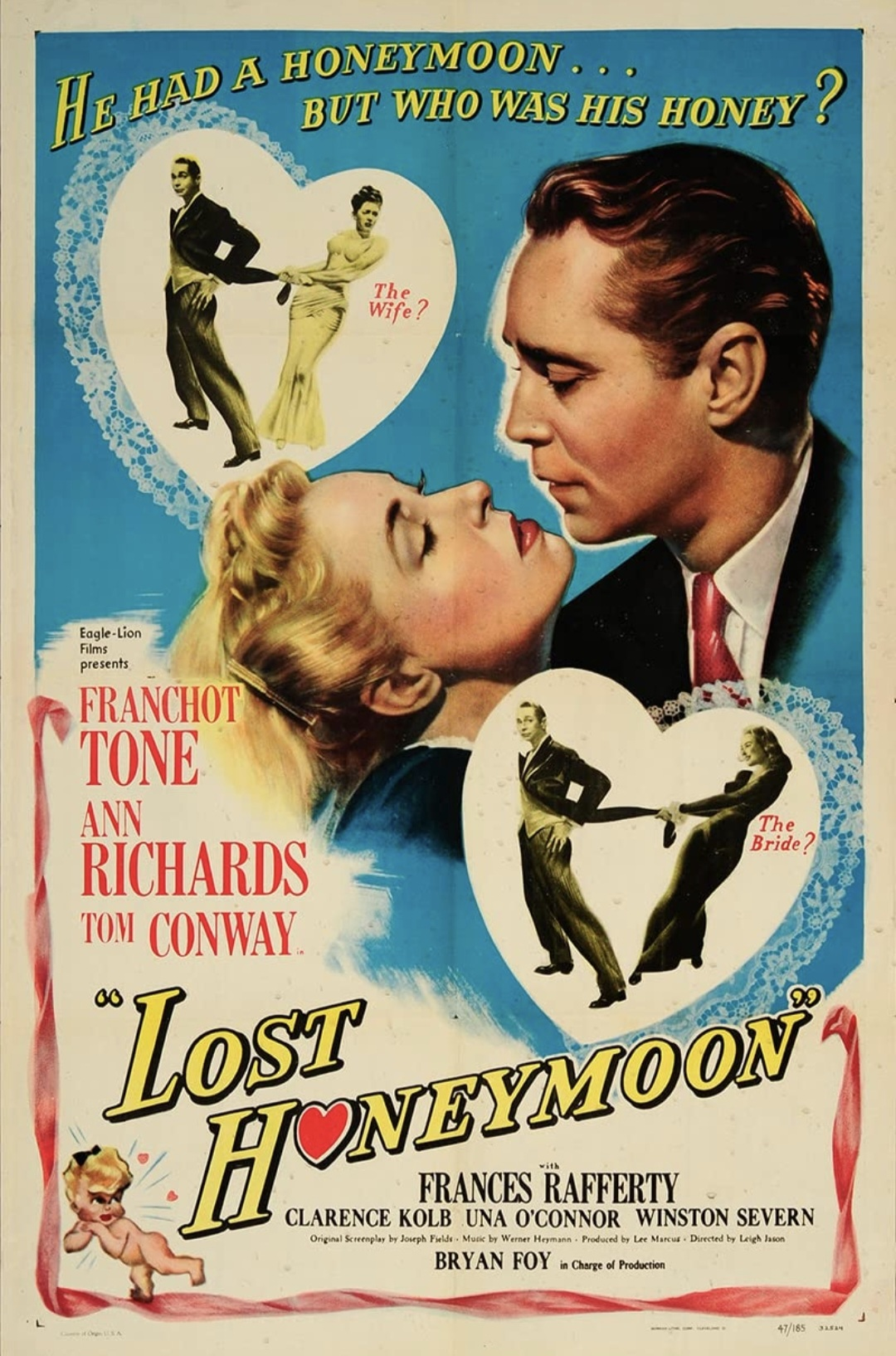
- Theatrical poster
- Directed by: Leigh Jason
- Written by: Joseph Fields
- Produced by: Bryan Foy; Lee S. Marcus
- Starring: Franchot Tone; Ann Richards; Tom Conway
- Cinematography: L. William O'Connell
- Edited by: Norman Colbert; Alfred DeGaetano
- Music by: Werner R. Heymann
- Production company: Bryan Foy Productions
- Distributed by: Eagle-Lion Films
- Release date: March 29, 1947
- Running time: 71 minutes
- Country: United States
- Language: English
- Budget: at least $1 million

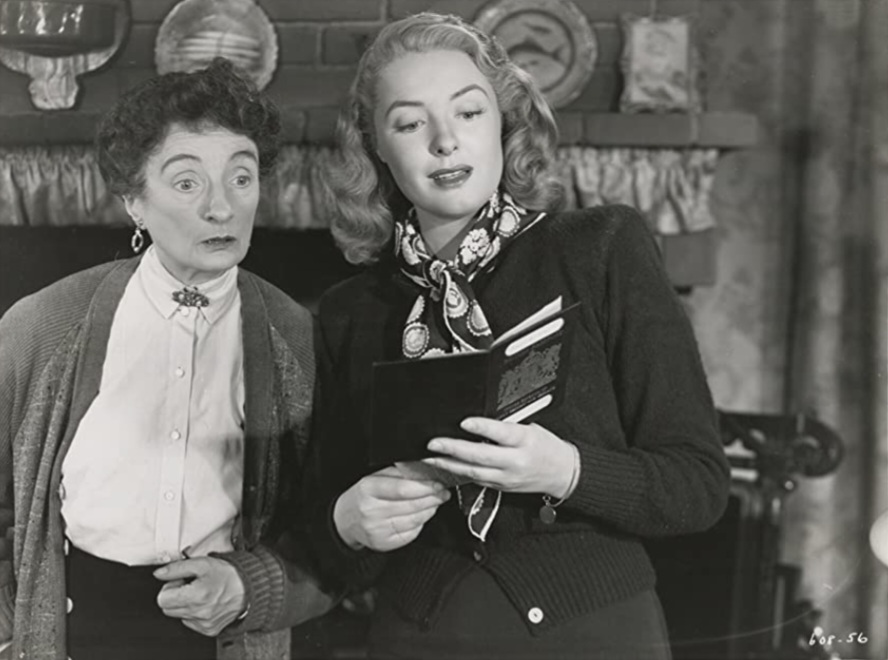
Left to right: Una O'Connor and Ann Richards

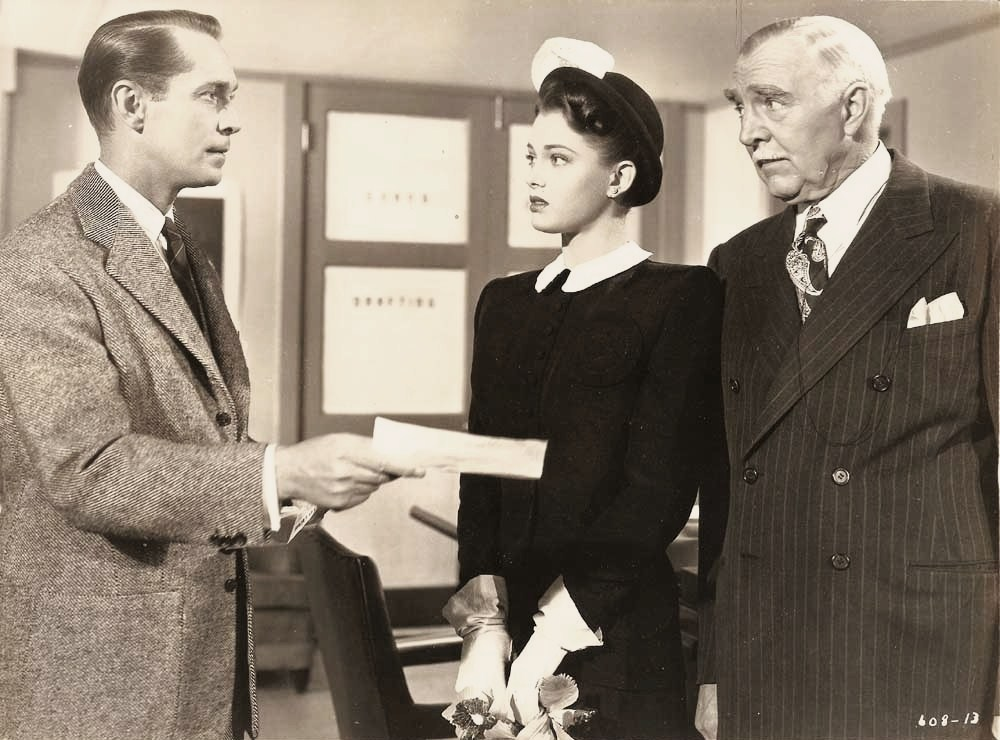
Left to right: Franchot Tone, Frances Rafferty, and Clarence Kolb

Lost Honeymoon is a 1947 American screwball comedy film directed by Leigh Jason and starring Franchot Tone, Ann Richards and Tom Conway. The working title of the film was Amy Comes Across.

== Plot ==
Soon after the end of World War II, a young Englishwoman, Amy Atkins, returns to the London flat where she and her best friend, Tillie, once used to live. Tillie died just before she was to leave for America to look for the man she married during the war. Her children, twins Joyce and Johnny Jr., are in the care of housekeeper Mrs. Tubbs. Amy decides to find Tillie's husband, Johnny Gray. She uses Tillie's passport and ticket to travel to America, taking the twins with her.

She is aided by the American Red Cross. An architect named John Gray receives a telegram informing him that his wife and children are coming by boat. He is shocked, since he is about to marry Lois, the daughter of his boss, Mr. Evans, that weekend. Johnny confides to his friend, Dr. Bob Davis, that just before his division left to go into battle on D-Day, he hit his head on a lamppost in London during a bombing raid and lost his memory for six weeks. For all he knows, he might have gotten married.

Johnny has a big bachelor party that night, so he plans to send Bob in his place to meet Tillie, but she calls to let him know she is in the same hotel where he is staying and where the party is being held. By mistake, Amy and the twins are mistaken for a bachelor party gag. One of Johnny's friends has the children run to their father. Johnny takes Amy and the twins away for a private chat. Despite the fact that she correctly identifies his unit, the 18th Airborne Division, Johnny refuses to believe he is the children's father. Amy tells him she will take him to court.

After the party, Johnny goes to a bar and gets further intoxicated. He then deliberately runs into a lamppost and knocks himself out. Amy receives a call from the police that her "husband" is down at the station. When she arrives, he is going on about his amnesia, which makes his behavior more understandable to her. A reporter there finds out that Tillie was a war bride. The next morning, it is all over the news. As a result, Lois breaks off their engagement and he loses his job.

As Amy "reminisces" about their life in England, she tells Johnny that she fell in love at first sight. Problems arise when he wants to exercise his conjugal rights. While he changes, Amy pretends to be asleep in bed with the children, but he is not fooled and angrily leaves.

Then the Red Cross finds out about her masquerade. The authorities question whether Amy has the right Johnny Gray and inform her that she will be deported. Fortunately, Mrs. Tubbs finds some photographs proving that Johnny is the children's father. When word of her deceit spreads, Lois and her father show up, offering to restore the engagement and his job. Johnny agrees to marry Lois the next day.

During the night, however, John concludes that he is in love with Amy. He pretends to have amnesia again to avoid marrying Lois. He rushes off to reach Amy before she leaves the country. In his hurry, he loses control of the car and crashes. Johnny ends up in a hospital. When Amy comes with the children, he tells her they will leave the room together.

== Cast ==
- Franchot Tone as Johnny Gray
- Ann Richards as Amy Atkins / Tillie Gray
- Tom Conway as Dr. Robert "Bob" Davis
- Frances Rafferty as Lois Evans
- Clarence Kolb as Mr. Evans, Lois's father
- Una O'Connor as Mrs. Tubbs
- Winston Severn as Johnny Gray Jr.
- Virginia Gregg as Mrs. Osborne
- Frank O'Connor as Riley
- Toni Todd as Miss Gibson
- James Flavin as Officer Max Riley
- Wilbur Mack as Wedding Guest
- Joan Valerie as Nurse

== Production ==
The movie was the second produced by the newly formed Eagle Lion (the first had been It's in the Bag.) The story was purchased in July 1946 and the original stars announced were Dennis O'Keefe and Anne Todd. Eventually Ann Richards replaced Todd and Franchot Tone replaced O'Keefe.

The film was originally known as His Briday Night then His Wedding Night and it was shot as Amy Comes Across. Production started on 7 October 1946 and finished by November.

Bryan Foy withdrew Eagle Lion from the MPAA's title registration scheme due to conflict over the title "Lost Honeymoon".

== Reception ==
Variety called it "a whipped-up bit of broth with entertainment values several rungs above average" which had "some neat pieces of business, cannily designed... strung on a machine-made story."
