= Edmond Angelo =

American film producer

Edmund Angelo (October 21, 1913 – March 27, 1983) was an American theatre and film producer. He worked in the New York stage and directed the film Breakdown (1952). He left show business to become a space engineer with a California firm. He was married to actress Ann Richards.
