= Guichon Creek (Still Creek tributary) =

Coordinates: 49°15′31″N 123°0′5″W

Guichon Creek is one of the most significant tributaries of Still Creek, an important waterway in Burnaby, British Columbia, Canada.

Guichon Creek is named after a pioneer family of the same name who owned land in Burnaby. The family owned a hunting cabin at the top of a ravine near Willingdon Avenue - then also known as Guichon Road.

In 1912, Guichon Creek became home to the Phillips-Hoyt Lumber Company, who "put a dam on the waterway to create a canal for transporting logs to a storage pond and a sawmill located on the site now occupied by the British Columbia Institute of Technology." Locals commonly used the creek as a fishing place and swimming hole.

Throughout the 1900s, the creek was exploited for resources, causing damage to its biodiversity. Several fish species were unable to reproduce in the creek for decades. However, by the 70s, restoration work begun at its south end. By 2006, Guichon Creek had been restored to a largely natural state thanks to the efforts of BCIT students and the City of Burnaby, among others.

== Bibliography ==
- Damer, Eric (March 2013). "Building BCIT: The culture, landscape, and architecture of the Burnaby Campus" (PDF).
