= Still Creek =

Watercourse in British Columbia, Canada

Coordinates: 49°15′0″N 122°57′34″W

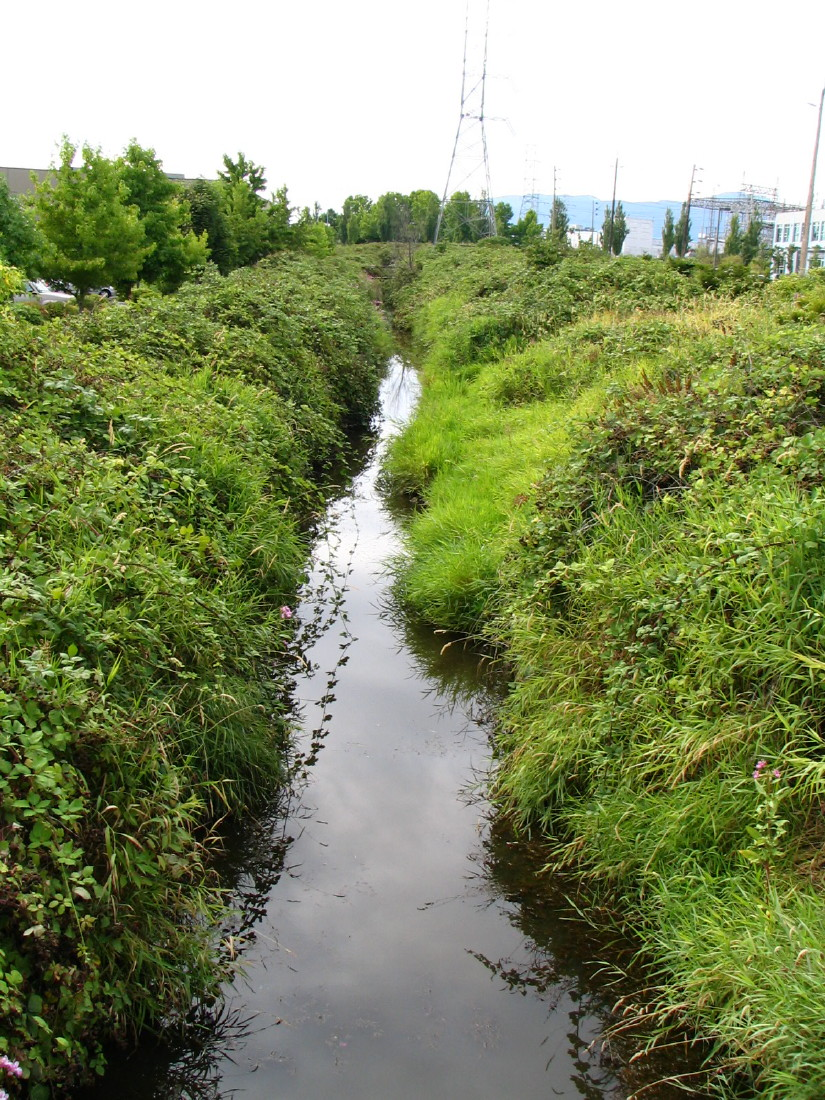
Still Creek at Henning Drive, west of Gilmore Station

Still Creek is a long stream flowing across Central Burnaby, British Columbia and into Burnaby Lake (which outflows into the Brunette River). Still Creek's path lies mainly through the industrial area which contributes to its high level of pollution, although through dedicated work of local volunteers the creek is slowly recovering.

In 2006, the City of Burnaby approved a plan to reduce the amount of flooding in the Still Creek watershed (the low-lying area of Gilmore Avenue is heavily flooded every year) while improving fish and wildlife habitat.

There is considerable vegetation along the creek banks that serves as a habitat for great blue heron, red-tailed hawk, belted kingfisher, and even an occasional pheasant, as well as aquatic songbirds such as red-winged blackbird. Beavers have always maintained their presence while river otters are more recent inhabitants. Coastal cutthroat trout are gradually returning. In November 2012, for the first time in almost 80 years, numerous full-sized salmon have been observed returning to spawn in many parts of Still Creek.

== Course ==
Still Creek arises in western Burnaby, just north of Central Park. From there it flows northwest into Vancouver, and then north. For years, the entire stretch from Central Park to 29th Avenue has been culverted as part of the City of Vancouver's storm sewer system. Across the street from the 29th Avenue Station, the creek emerges into the open, and runs north along the bottom of the Renfrew Ravine. After running under the intersection of 22nd Avenue and Renfrew Street, the creek runs through the park beside the Renfrew Community Centre. It then is culverted again for several blocks, emerging just before the Grandview Highway, where it turns east, towards Burnaby.

From Renfrew Street in Vancouver to Gilmore in Burnaby, Still Creek has been channelized for most of its length, and culverted for the rest. East of Gilmore, the creek has been left in a mostly natural channel, and for the last kilometre or so before Burnaby Lake, the land on either side of the creek has been protected from development.

== Tributaries ==
Still Creek is the main stream draining the western half of the Brunette watershed. As such, it has many tributaries. The following are the most significant:

- Chubb Creek - Shortened by development, Chubb Creek currently begins at the Lougheed Highway, just east of Boundary Road in Burnaby, and runs southeast, under Gilmore at Gilmore Station, and enters Still Creek underground a couple of hundred metres further southeast.
- Guichon Creek - Guichon Creek arises in the hills south of the Still Creek valley, and runs north, across the campus of the British Columbia Institute of Technology (BCIT), entering Still Creek just west of Willingdon Avenue.
- Beecher Creek - Beecher Creek arises in North Burnaby, and flows south, through a ravine, under the Lougheed Highway, and enters Still Creek west of Holdom.
- Spring Brook - Spring Brook runs northeast of Boundary Road and joins Still Creek just west of Gilmore Station.

== See also ==
- List of rivers of British Columbia
- Bodies of water in Vancouver
