= Michael Aitkens =

British actor and writer

- Born: 1947 (age 78–79); England
- Occupations: Actor, writer
- Years active: 1971–present
- Known for: The Henderson Kids
- Spouse: Veronica Lang (div.)
- Children: 2 (including Daisy Aitkens)

Michael Aitkens (born 1947) is a British actor and writer of drama scripts for movies, television and stage. His BBC situation comedy Waiting for God, first shown in 1990, was BAFTA nominated.

== Early life ==
Aitkens was educated at Haileybury in England. He then lived in Australia for ten years and Los Angeles, United States, for two years, graduating from the AFI Conservatory (Los Angeles) in 1981.

== Career ==
Aitkens has worked in film, television and theatre since the late 1960s. More than 150 of his scripts have been produced in the UK, United States and Australia.

Wanting to hone his skills in television, he moved to Australia in the early 1970s where he established himself as an actor in l series such as Homicide (1972-74), Division 4 (1972-73), Ryan (1974), Matlock Police (1975), Rush (1976), Power Without Glory (1976), Bluey (1977) and Skyways (1979. He also started as a writer, on The Comedy Game (1971) and Matlock Police.

From 1980 to 1981, Aitkens studied at the AFI Conservatory in Los Angeles, after which he returned to Australia to worked as a writer on several television series including A Country Practice (1982-1984) and Special Squad (1985). He also had acting roles in A Country Practice as Jonathon Hawthorn, and popular children's series The Henderson Kids as Walter Mullens, the long lost father of main protagonists Tam and Steve Henderson (also featuring a young Kylie Minogue and Ben Mendelsohn). Film roles included Run, Chrissie, Run! (1986) and Backstage (1987).

Since 1989, Aitkens has lived back in the UK, where he works as a writer/producer, mainly of his own original series, and formed an independent production company, Daisylu. His British writing credits include The Last Detective, Waiting for God, The River, Roy's Raiders, Making News, Stay Lucky, Honey for Tea, Class Act, A Perfect State, Harry and the Wrinklies and Life As We Know It. He was a core writer for Midsomer Murders from 2006 to 2014.

Aitkens is also an occasional humorous newspaper columnist.

== Personal life ==
Aitkens was married to Australian actress Veronica Lang. He has two daughters, including actress, writer and director Daisy Aitkens.

== Acting credits ==
=== Film ===
Year	Title	Role	Type
1971	Demonstrator	Haler - Youth	Feature film
1972	The Man Who Shot the Albatross		TV movie
1973	The Affray at Fogg's Humpy	Trooper Hosie	Short film
1975	Armchair Cinema: Tully	Barman	TV movie
1976	Deathcheaters	Police Car Driver	Feature film
1978	Long Weekend	Bartender	Feature film
1979	The Mismatch		TV movie
1979	Harvest of Hate	David	TV movie
1980	A Toast to Melba	Charles Armstrong	TV movie
1981	Airhawk	The Cowboy	TV movie
1982	The Highest Honor	Major R.M. Ingleton	TV movie
1982	Runaway Island	Joe Dunn	TV movie
1984	Relatives	Peter Peterson	Feature film
1984	Run, Chrissie, Run!	Riley	Feature film
1985	Time's Raging	Cam	TV movie
1985	Slip-Up	Hinch	TV movie
1988	Backstage	Robert Landau	Feature film

=== Television ===
Year	Title	Role	Type
1971	The Comedy Game	Arthur Potter	TV series, 1 episode: "Arthur"
1972–73	Division 4	Andy Hill / Les Williams / Dave Ross / Harry Roberts / Chopper Hughes	TV series, 5 episodes
1974	Ryan	Bernie Wood	TV series, 1 episode: "A Deep Dark Place"
1972–74	Homicide	Alan 'Chick' Palmer / Jack Devine / Charlie Bennett	TV series, 3 episodes
1972–75	Behind the Legend		TV series, 2 episodes
1972–75	Matlock Police	Rod Clark / Hank Anderson / Ralph Peterson / Max	TV series, 4 episodes
1975	Ben Hall	Troy	TV miniseries, 2 episodes
1976	Shannon's Mob		TV series, 1 episode: "You've Got to Have Credentials"
1976	Rush	Charlie Clune	TV series, 1 episode: "Farrar's Pride"
1976	Luke's Kingdom	Brash	TV miniseries, 1 episode: "The Adam and the Damned"
1976	Power Without Glory	Piggy Lewis	TV series, 12 episodes
1976	The Lost Islands		TV series, 2 episodes
1977	Bluey	Mike Scott	TV series, 1 episode: "It's Worth the Risk"
1978	The Truckies	Chris	TV series, 12 episodes
1978	Run From the Morning	Harry Blake	TV miniseries, 6 episodes
1979	Skyways	Frank Harper	TV series, 2 episodes
1979	Ride on Stranger	John Terry	TV miniseries, 2 episodes
1979	One Day Miller		TV series, 7 episodes
1980	Trial By Marriage	Various characters	TV series, 7 episodes
1980	Secret Valley		TV series, 1 episode: "Big City"
1981	Daily at Dawn		TV series, 1 episode: "My Favourite Nightmares"
1979–81	Cop Shop	David Hurley / Kevin Dalton / Craig Latimer / Paul Rankin	TV series, 8 episodes
1984	Five Mile Creek	McStay	TV series, 1 episode: "The Hangman's Noose"
1984	Carson's Law	Det. Sgt. Cam Neil	TV series, 4 episodes
1984–85	Runaway Island	Joe Dunn	TV series, 4 episodes
1982–85	A Country Practice	Jonathan Hawthorn / Eric Brewer	TV series, 10 episodes
1985	The Henderson Kids	Walter 'Wal' Mullens	TV series, 8 episodes
1986	Screen Two	Rod Blue	TV series, 1 episode: "The McGuffin"
1987	The Henderson Kids II	Walter 'Wal' Mullens	TV series, 6 episodes
1988	The Return of Sherlock Holmes	Reverend Roundhay	TV series, 1 episode: "The Devil's Foot"
1988	Rumpole of the Bailey	Thomas Campion	TV series, 1 episode: "Rumpole and the Age of Miracles"
1989	Storyboard	Foreign Office Mole	TV series, 1 episode: "Making News"
1991	Roy's Raiders	Theatre Director	TV series, 1 episode
1992	Moon and Sun	Roger Stacpoole	TV series: "Crystal Clear it's Murder"

=== Stage ===
Year	Title	Role	Type
1971	The Man Who Shot the Albatross		Princess Theatre for MTC
1971	The Night Thoreau Spent in Jail	John	Ensemble Theatre, Sydney
1971	Madly in Love		AMP Theatrette, Sydney
1971	Land of Dreaming		UNSW, Parade Theatre, Sydney
1971	The National Health or Nurse Norton’s Affair		UNSW, Parade Theatre, Sydney
1971	Lasseter		UNSW, Parade Theatre, Sydney
1974	Gordon Chater's Scandals of '74		Macleay Theatre, Sydney
	Trial by Marriage		JDC
1976	The Gift		Stables Theatre, Sydney, Victorian College of the Arts
1976	The Shoemaker's Holiday	Hammon	Sydney Opera House
1977	Son of Naked Vicar		The Speakeasy, Sydney
1979	Roots III		The Speakeasy, Sydney

=== Radio ===
Year	Title	Role	Type
1979	Laura and the Angel	Capt Thistlewaite	ABC Radio Sydney
1979	The Moth Affair	Kate's Lover	ABC Radio Sydney
1979	Episode on a Thursday Evening	Jerry	ABC Radio Sydney
1979	A Night with Hamlet	Orpheus / Mennippus	ABC Radio Sydney
1979	The Fire on the Snow	Bowers	ABC Radio Sydney

== Writing credits ==
=== Television ===
Year	Title	Credit	Type
1971	The Comedy Game	Writer	TV series, 1 episode
1973	Matlock Police	Writer	TV series, 1 episode
1978	The Truckies	Writer	TV series, 1 episode
1978	Tickled Pink	Writer	TV series, 1 episode
1980–82	Trial By Marriage	Writer	TV series, 13 episodes
1984	Singles	Writer	TV miniseries, 1 episode
1984	Matthew and Son	Story	TV movie
1982–85	A Country Practice	Writer	TV series, 7 episodes
1985	Special Squad	Writer	TV series, 1 episode
1986	Call Me Mister	Writer	TV series, S1 E2: "Tour de Force"
1988	Touch the Sun: Top Enders	Writer	TV movie
1987–88	Bust	Writer	TV series, 8 episodes
1988	The River	Creator	TV series, 6 episodes
1989	Knastmusik	Writer	TV series, 2 episodes
1989	A Fine Romance	Writer	TV series, 1 episode
1989	Storyboard	Writer	TV series, 1 episode
1989	The Paradise Club	Writer	TV series, 1 episode
1990	Making News	Writer	TV series, 2 episodes
1991	Roy's Raiders	Writer	TV series, 6 episodes
1990–91	Stay Lucky	Writer	TV series, 5 episodes
1992	Moon and Son	Writer	TV series, 2 episodes
1990–94	Waiting for God	Writer	TV series, 47 episodes
1994	Honey for Tea	Writer	TV series, 7 episodes
1994–95	Class Act	Writer	TV series, 12 episodes
1997	A Perfect State	Writer	TV series, 7 episodes
1998	Minty	Writer	TV series, 3 episodes
2001	Life as We Know It	Writer	TV series, 7 episodes
2000–02	Harry and the Wrinklies	Writer	TV series, 21 episodes
2003	Sweet Medicine	Writer	TV series, 1 episode
2004	The Last Detective	Writer	TV series, 1 episode
2004	Murder in Suburbia	Writer	TV series, S1 E2: "Stag Night"
2006–14	Midsomer Murders	Writer (screenplay)	TV series, 9 episodes
2007	Fear, Stress & Anger	Writer	TV series, 6 episodes

=== Stage ===
Year	Title	Credit	Type
1975	Bloody Harry	Playwright	Independent Theatre Sydney, Canberra
	Private Lives, Public Moments		London's West End
2017	Waiting for God	Playwright	Broadway Theatre, Letchworth, Devonshire Park Theatre, Eastbourne, Yvonne Arnaud Theatre, Guildford, New Wolsey Theatre, Ipswich, Theatre Royal, Bath, Festival Theatre, Malvern, Lighthouse, Poole, Theatre Royal, Windsor, Grand Theatre, Blackpool, Oxford Playhouse, The Lowry, Salford Quays (UK tour) with Seabright Productions
2019–20	Waiting for God	Playwright	Unicorn Theatre, Melbourne, Titirangi Theatre, Auckland, Hutt Repertory Theatre
2022–23	Waiting for God	Playwright	Brighton Open Air Theatre with Sarah Mann Company, St. Johns Hall Berkshire with Mortimer Dramatic Society, Rotorua Little Theatre, 1812 Theatre, Victoria
2024	Waiting for God	Playwright	Guide Bridge Theatre, Manchester, New Norfolk Memorial Hall, Tasmania
