= Once in a Blue Moon: A Celebration of Australian Musicals =

- Country of origin: Australia
- Original language: English
- No. of seasons: 1
- No. of episodes: 1

Original release
- Network: ABC
- Release: 27 April 1994

Once In A Blue Moon: A Celebration of Australian Musicals is a 1994 television special featuring songs from Australian musicals from the 1950s to the 1990s.

The special was staged as a television concert, performed live before an invited audience. It featured many leading musical theatre performers including Nancye Hayes, Geraldine Turner, Simon Burke, Philip Quast, Tony Sheldon, Robyn Archer, Judi Connelli and Jodie Gillies. The Melbourne Symphony Orchestra conducted by Brian Stacey accompanied the performers.

== Soundtrack ==
Once In A Blue Moon

Soundtrack album by Various
- Released: 1994
- Label: Australian Broadcasting Corporation
- Producer: Peter Taplin

A soundtrack was released by ABC Music. It was nominated for Best Original Soundtrack, Cast or Show Album at the 1995 ARIA Awards.

=== Track listing ===
CD/Cassette

No.	Title	Writer(s)	Vocals	Length
1.	"We Are They" from Manning Clark's History of Australia - The Musical"	M. Armiger/T. Robertson/D. Watson/M. Gilmore/Anon.	Judi Connelli and cast	2:45
2.	"Saturday Girl" from Lola Montez"	P. Stannard/P. Benjamin	Philip Gould	2:54
3.	"She Rose Above It" from Orlando Rourke"	A. John/N. Enright	Jodie Gillies	4:32
4.	"Die Like A Kelly" from Ned Kelly"	P. Flynn/R. Livermore	Geraldine Turner	3:30
5.	"Cardigan Street" from Jonah"	A. John/J. Romeril	Nancye Hayes, Valerie Bader, Jodie Gillies	4:02
6.	"Sunday Arvo" from The Sentimental Bloke"	A. Arlen/N. Brown/L. Thomson (after C.J. Dennis)	Robyn Archer	1:51
7.	"I Dips Me Lid" from The Sentimental Bloke"	A. Arlen/N. Brown/L. Thomson (after C.J. Dennis)	Michael Cormick	3:38
8.	"The Unknown Soldier" from Manning Clark's History of Australia - The Musical"	M. Armiger/J.S. Neilson (adapted by T. Robertson/D. Watson)	Philip Quast	3:52
9.	"Jindyworoback" from The Venetian Twins"	T. Clarke/N. Enright	Drew Forsythe	3:18
10.	"Choker's Lane" from Darlinghurst Nights"	M. Lambert/K. Slessor	Robyn Archer	4:20
11.	"Once In A Blue Moon" from Summer Rain"	T. Clarke/N. Enright	Judi Connelli, Geraldine Turner, Tony Sheldon, Philip Quast	3:45
12.	"You Might Miss the Mongrel" from Summer Rain"	T. Clarke/N. Enright	Nancye Hayes, Valerie Bader	2:28
13.	"It's Not The Same" from King of Country"	T. Gooding	Jodie Gillies	3:39
14.	"We In The Shadows" from Manning Clark's History of Australia - The Musical"	M. Armiger/T. Robertson/D. Watson	Geraldine Turner	3:29
15.	"Crazy Asian War" from Pearls Before Swine"	C. Harriott/D. Watkins	Kathleen de Leon, Michael Cormick	4:46
16.	"Forgiven" from The Villain of Flowers"	A. Crowley	Simon Burke	3:38
17.	"Love Magic" from The Wedding Song"	D.S. Rae/H. Bell	Genevieve Davis	3:20
18.	"Love's Like Cyanide" from The Emerald Room"	C. Harriott/D. Watkins	Judi Connelli	3:01
19.	"Bran Nue Dae" from Bran Nue Dae"	J. Chi/Kuckles	Laurence Clifford and cast	3:10
