= Keeping Mum (TV series) =

British TV sitcom (1997–1998)

- Genre: Sitcom
- Written by: Geoffrey Atherden
- Starring: Stephanie Cole; Martin Ball; David Haig; Meera Syal
- Country of origin: United Kingdom
- Original language: English
- No. of series: 2
- No. of episodes: 16

Production
- Executive producer: Geoffrey Perkins
- Producer: Stephen McCrum

Original release
- Network: BBC1
- Release: 17 April 1997 – 16 June 1998

Keeping Mum is a British sitcom, written by Geoffrey Atherden and broadcast on BBC One for two series between 17 April 1997 and 16 June 1998. The show was based on the long-running ABC series Mother and Son, written by Atherden and a hit show in Australia between 1984 and 1994. Keeping Mum stars Stephanie Cole as the main character, Peggy Beare, Martin Ball and David Haig as her sons and Meera Syal as her daughter-in-law.

== Cast ==
- Stephanie Cole as Peggy Beare
- Martin Ball as Andrew Beare
- David Haig as Richard Beare
- Meera Syal as Tina Beare

== Episodes ==
=== Series 1 (1997) ===
No. overall	No. in series	Title	Original release date
1	1	"The Promotion"	17 April 1997
Andrew has an interview for a job in London.
2	2	"The Funeral"	24 April 1997
The family attend the funeral of Uncle William, and Peggy takes a fancy to some oranges.
3	3	"The Babysitter"	1 May 1997
Andrew hires Richard's babysitter to be company for Peggy.
4	4	"The Accident"	8 May 1997
Peggy tries to nurse Andrew after he injures his foot at work.
5	5	"The Dog"	15 May 1997
Richard presents his mother with a puppy, much to Andrew's chagrin.
6	6	"The Last Will"	22 May 1997
Andrew is dismayed to discover that his inheritance is conditional on him living with his mother until her death.
7	7	"The Oysters"	29 May 1997
Peggy is charged with shoplifting.
8	8	"The Nursing Home"	5 June 1997
Andrew takes the difficult decision that his mother needs professional care.

=== Series 2 (1998) ===
No. overall	No. in series	Title	Original release date
9	1	"The Picnic"	16 April 1998
The family go for a day out, during which Peggy goes missing.
10	2	"The Card Game"	23 April 1998
Andrew invites some friends round to play poker.
11	3	"The Budgie"	30 April 1998
Peggy is given the responsibility of looking after a talking budgie for a few days.
12	4	"The Aunt"	14 May 1998
Andrew arranges for Peggy's estranged sister Marjorie (Prunella Scales) to visit, while he spends some time with Wendy.
13	5	"The Sign"	21 May 1998
Peggy decides to volunteer at the church.
14	6	"The Thief"	28 May 1998
Peggy steals a clock from a neighbour, convinced that it belongs to her.
15	7	"The Surprise"	4 June 1998
It is Richard's birthday. Peggy is full of party spirit, while Richard is clearly hiding something.
16	8	"The Morning After"	16 June 1998
Peggy goes into shock after Wendy spends the night with Andrew.

== Reception ==
In his review for The Independent, Thomas Sutcliffe said that "Cole's performance is never just clownish", concluding his review by saying: "The result is a programme that is only intermittently funny, to be honest, but at least has larger ambitions for what popular comedy can do."

== Home media ==
The entire series was released on DVD region 2 in 2007.
