= Tickled Pink (TV series) =

Australian anthology series

Tickled Pink was an anthology series of self contained short comedies screened by the ABC, airing for two seasons in 1978 and 1981.

The first series of six half hour self contained episodes opened on Thursday 21 September 1978 with Neutral Ground, about a divorced couple played by Peter Sumner and Cornelia Frances. This was followed by Relative Air Pollution, The Family Business, Palace of Dreams, One Day Miller, and A Visit to the Uncle The Sydney Morning Heralds Garry Shelley called One Day Miller "an entertaining situation comedy" and the Sun-Herald's Don Groves said of that episode "The problem with this show's concept is that the situations simply aren't conducive to much mirth, nor are the characters particularly arresting.

The fifth episode One Day Miller was continued on in a TV series of the same name and the opening episode Neutral Ground was spun off into a TV series called Trial By Marriage. Charle Stamp won an Australian Writers Guild Award for Palace of Dreams, and Neutral Ground by Michael Aitkens won the 1979 Logie for Best Television Script, a Sammy Award for Best Comedy Programme, and Penguin Awards for Best Comedy Programme and Best Comedy Script.

The second series started with Water Man on 8 January 1981, with Max Gillies starring as an advertising man looking for inspiration while in the bath. This episodes had mixed reviews. Ian Marshall in the Age praising the lead saying "But as caught by Max Gillies in this inspired performance, he came to life as few other characters in ABC comedy have done." The Sydney Morning Heralds The angry eye column said "Not even the talents of Mr Gillies could save this waterlogged nonsense from going down the drain." This was followed by Desert Foxes where a group of soldier took shelter during the war. It was described by the Age's Jane Sullivan as "A derivative mish-mash of half-remembered ideas from 'It Ain't Half Hot Mum', 'Dad's Army' and other comedies heavy on wartime nostalgia, it was stuck loosely together with a touch of slapstick." The final episode was Honeymoon, Honeymoon on 22 January It features a newly married couple who plan to honeymoon at the grooms ex wife's house but things go wrong and she is there with her boyfriend.

== Episodes ==
1978

- Neutral Ground (writer, Michael Aitkens)

Peter Sumner and Cornelia Frances

- Relative Air Pollution

Noel Ferrier, Robina Beard, Robert Hughes, Judi Farr, Stephen O’Rourke, Shaunna O’Grady

- The Family Business

Max Gillies, Dawn Lake, Sharon Higgins, Peter Bensley

- Palace of Dreams (writer, Charles Stamp)

John Meillon, Jill Perryman

- One Day Miller (writer, Geoffrey Atherden)

Tony Llewellyn-Jones, Penne Hackforth-Jones, Robin Ramsay, Geraldine Turner, Clare Woodward

- A Visit to the Uncle (writer, Morris Lurie)

Barry Otto, Jane Harders, Max Gillies, Bunney Brooke, Johnny Lockwood

1981

- Water Man

Max Gillies, Frank Wilson, Terry Bader, Marion Ward, Maggie Dence and Brian Wenzel

- Desert Foxes (writer, Charles Stamp)

Max Cullen, Gordon Poole, Ron Falk, David Waters, Max Gillies, Gary Files, Lex Marinos

- Honeymoon, Honeymoon (writer, Charles Stamp)

Donald McDonald, Jacki Weaver, Mel Gibson and Jennifer Hagan.
