= Elizabeth Alexander (actress) =

Australian actress, director and teacher

- Born: Adelaide, South Australia, Australia
- Other name: Liz Alexander
- Education: All Hallows' School; National Institute of Dramatic Art
- Occupations: Actress; director; teacher
- Years active: 1967–present
- Spouse: George Spartels (1984–2006)
- Children: 2

Elizabeth Alexander (sometimes credited as Liz Alexander) is an Australian actress, director and teacher.

== Early life ==
Alexander was born in Adelaide, South Australia, and attended All Hallows' School, a private girls school in Brisbane. She went on to study acting at Sydney's National Institute of Dramatic Art (NIDA), graduating in 1973.

== Career ==
Alexander's acting career began early with a part in the series Bellbird in 1967. However, it was straight after graduating from NIDA, that she got her big break with the part of Esther Wolcott in the Australian Broadcasting Corporation (ABC) series Seven Little Australians. Allegedly, the producers had all but given up on the show, because they did not feel that they had found a suitable actress for the part, until they discovered Alexander. She was actually younger than actress Barbara Llewellyn, who played her stepdaughter Meg in the series.

The ten-part series delivered huge ratings when it was broadcast in 1973, and was also the first ABC series to enjoy international acclaim. It went on to win three Australian Film Institute Awards, four Penguins, a 1974 Logie Award for Most Outstanding Drama Series and the 1974 George Wallace Memorial Logie for Best New Talent for Alexander.

Alexander had a starring role opposite Colin Friels in "Pride", an episode of the 1992 anthology series Seven Deadly Sins. She had a recurring guest role in the high rating Australian medical drama All Saints as Dr. Alison Newell, ex-wife of Dr. Frank Campion, played by John Howard. She was not initially written as his ex-wife, as her character appeared before Howard joined the cast. Apparently, it was the sharp onscreen dynamic between Alexander and Howard in their early scenes together that made the writers decide to write this history into Alexander's character.

From 2008 to 2009, Alexander appeared in Home and Away playing Christine Jones, the overprotective conservative mother of Melody Jones. Her other television credits include Silent Number, Special Squad, Chopper Squad, Farscape, Murder Call, Salem's Lot and Time Trax, a science fiction series in which she starred as computer hologram 'SELMA' (alongside Dale Midkiff).

Her film work includes playing the lead role in The Killing of Angel Street (1981), opposite John Hargreaves), which won an award at the Berlin Film Festival. She also starred in Summerfield (1977) with Nick Tate and John Waters, Fred Schepisi's The Chant of Jimmie Blacksmith (1978) playing young school teacher Miss Graf, The Journalist (1979) with Jack Thompson and Sam Neill and Sebastian and the Sparrow (1990) opposite Robert Coleby. 2010 saw her appear in a thriller called The Clinic and in 2011 she made an appearance as Cherry in another Fred Schepisi film, The Eye of the Storm. Her most recent film role was as the older iteration of Dora in 2022 feature Blueback, opposite Eric Bana, Radha Mitchell and Mia Wasikowska.

Alexander's numerous theatre credits include playing Hermione in The Winter's Tale, Portia in The Merchant of Venice (for which she received glowing reviews), Martha in the Sydney Theatre Company's production of Who's Afraid of Virginia Woolf? (for which she again received extremely positive reviews), Kate in another STC production of Harold Pinter's Old Times and many more. She also played anthropologist Margaret Mead in David Williamson's play Heretic. The play, based on Mead's life and work, was the subject of much debate and controversy, due to the very public row between the playwright, Williamson, and the director Wayne Harrison over the play's production.

Alexander has also directed a number of plays and written several screenplays, including a short film titled Memento (released by Village Roadshow) which she also directed about the emotional problems caused by the return of a father to his family, a young boy and his mother. She directed the feature film, A Spy in the Family. She also directed a 1981 Sydney Theatre Company production of The Woman Tamer starring Mel Gibson.

Alexander also does voiceover work.

== Personal life ==
Alexander was married to actor and Play School presenter George Spartels from 1984 to 2006 and has two daughters. She currently lives in Sydney and works at Queenwood School for Girls as a dramatic arts teacher.

== Awards ==
Year	Work	Award	Category	Result	Ref.
1974	Seven Little Australians	Logie Awards	George Wallace Memorial Logie for Best New Talent	Won	
1993	Seven Deadly Sins	Australian Film Institute Awards	Best Actress in a Leading Role in a Television Drama	Nominated	

== Filmography ==
=== Film ===
==== As actor ====
Year	Title	Role	Type	Ref.
1975	Ride a Wild Pony	Miss Hildebrand (teacher)	Feature film	
1977	Summerfield	Jenny Abbott	Feature film	
1978	The Chant of Jimmie Blacksmith	Petra Graf	Feature film	
1979	The Journalist	Liz Corbett	Feature film	
1981	The Killing of Angel Street	Jessica	Feature film	
1981	The Coming		Short film	
1983	One Last Chance		Short film	
1988	Sebastian and the Sparrow	Jenny Thornbury	Feature film	
1988	Two Brothers Running	Barbara Borstein	Feature film	
2010	The Clinic	Ms Shepard	Feature film	
2011	The Eye of the Storm	Cherry Cheeseman	Feature film	
2022	Blueback	Older Dora	Feature film	

==== As writer/director/producer ====
Year	Title	Role	Type	Ref.
1982	Memento	Writer / director	Short film	
1983	A Spy in the Family	Director	Feature film	
1985	Emmett Stone	Writer / director	TV film	
1996	Since the Accident	Producer	Short film	
1997	Foursome	Producer	Short film	

=== Television ===
Year	Title	Role	Type	Ref.
1967	Bellbird		1 episode	
1973	Seven Little Australians	Esther Wolcott	Miniseries, 10 episodes	
1974	Behind the Legend	Guest lead role: Elizabeth Kenny	Anthology series, episode: "Elizabeth Kenny"	
1974	This Love Affair		Episode 6: "Seven-Tenths of a Second"	
1974–1975	Silent Number	Jean Hamilton	38 episodes	
1975	Ben Hall	Angela Mitchell	8 episodes	
1976	King's Men		1 episode	
1978	Chopper Squad	Francis Carter	Episode 5: "Psychotic Lady"	
1978	Case for the Defence	Jean	Episode 9: "A Plea of Insanity"	
1978	The Scalp Merchant		TV film	
1979	Golden Soak	Janet Garrety	Miniseries, 6 episodes	
1980; 1981	Cop Shop	Virginia Kingston / Sue McGregor	4 episodes	
1981	A Sporting Chance		Episode 4: "The Name of the Game"	
1984	Singles	Alison Kirk	5 episodes	
1984	Special Squad	Edith	Episode 8: "The Wurzburg Link"	
1986	Ivanhoe	Voice	Animated TV film	
1987	Rafferty's Rules		1 episode	
1987	Willing and Abel		1 episode	
1991	About Face	Nightingale Ward Sister	1 episode	
1991	G.P.	Carmen Gailey	1 episode	
1993	Seven Deadly Sins	Jill Pascoe	Anthology series, episode 2: "Pride"	
1993	Bonjour la Classe	Nurse	1 episode	
1993–1994	Time Trax	SELMA / Kit	43 episodes	
1998	Murder Call	Hilary Windsor	Season 2, episode 12: "Something Fishy"	
1999	Alien Cargo	Rojean Page, Explorer Dolphin	TV film	
1999	The Lost World	Mrs. Krux	1 episode	
2000	The Thing About Vince	Mrs. Rogers	Miniseries, 1 episode	
2002	Farscape	Vella	1 episode	
2003	Page to Stage	Performance Director	Film documentary	
2003–2006	All Saints	Dr. Alison Newell	23 episodes	
2004	Salem's Lot	Ann Norton (as Liz Alexander)	Miniseries, 2 episodes	
2008–2009	Home and Away	Christine Jones	20 episodes	
2010	Lost Girl	Kala	1 episode	
2011	Snobs	Helena	TV film	
2012	Fatal Honeymoon	Cindy Thomas	TV film	
2013	In Your Dreams	Magistrate #2	1 episode	
2019	Home and Away	Judge	2 episodes	
2020	The Secrets She Keeps	Renee Cole	6 episodes	
2021	Clickbait	Andrea Brewer	7 episodes	
2026	Dog Park	Penny	6 episodes	

== Theatre ==
=== As actor ===
Year	Title	Role	Notes	Ref.
1969	The Wizard of Oz	Dancer	Arts Theatre, Adelaide	
1970	Philadelphia, Here I Come!		SGIO Theatre, Brisbane with QTC	
1971	Hippolytus		UNSW Old Tote Theatre, Sydney with NIDA	
1971	You Can’t Take It With You	J-Woman / Olga Katrina	UNSW Old Tote Theatre, Sydney with NIDA	
1971	Lady Windermere's Fan	Lady Agatha Carlisle	NIDA Theatre, Sydney	
1972	A Country Girl		UNSW Old Tote Theatre, Sydney with NIDA	
1972	The Creation		NIDA Theatre, Sydney	
1973	Butley		Independent Theatre, Sydney, Playhouse, Canberra with Old Tote Theatre Company	
1976	The Season at Sarsaparilla	Julia Sheen	Sydney Opera House with Nimrod, Sydney / Old Tote Theatre Company	
1977	The Three Sisters	Irina	Sydney Opera House with Old Tote Theatre Company	
1978	Mothers and Fathers	Geraldine Boon	Twelfth Night Theatre, Brisbane	
1979	Macbeth	Lady Macduff / Weird Sister	Melbourne Athenaeum with MTC	
1979	Arms and the Man	Raina Petkoff	Melbourne Athenaeum with MTC	
1979	Uncle Vanya	Yelena Andreyevna	Melbourne Athenaeum with MTC	
1979	The Rivals	Julia	Melbourne Athenaeum with MTC	
1979	Betrayal	Emma	Playhouse, Canberra, Nimrod St Theatre, Sydney, Russell St Theatre, Melbourne with MTC	
1980	The Maids	Lead	Melbourne Athenaeum with MTC	
1980	Shorts	Lead	King O'Malley Theatre Company	
1981	Is This Where We Came In?		Stables Theatre, Sydney with The King O'Malley Theatre Company & STC	
1982	Godsend	Ginny Stacey	Melbourne Athenaeum with MTC	
1983	Signal Driver	Ivy Vokes	SGIO Theatre, Brisbane, Melbourne Athenaeum with QTC & MTC	
1983	Maid's Tragedy	Lead	Melbourne Athenaeum with MTC	
1986	Wild Honey		Seymour Centre, Sydney with Nimrod Theatre Company	
1986	She Stoops to Conquer	Kate / Sasha	Seymour Centre, Sydney with Nimrod Theatre Company	
1986	The Merchant of Venice	Portia	Seymour Centre, Sydney with Nimrod Theatre Company	
1986	All's Well That Ends Well	Diana	Seymour Centre, Sydney with Nimrod Theatre Company	
1987	Tartuffe	Elmire	Seymour Centre, Sydney with Nimrod Theatre Company	
1987	The Winter's Tale	Hermione	Seymour Centre, Sydney with Nimrod Theatre Company	
1992	Prin	Dibbs	Marian St Theatre, Sydney	
1995–1997	Who's Afraid of Virginia Woolf?	Martha	Glen St Theatre, Sydney with STC & Australian tour	
1996	Heretic	Margaret Mead / Elsie Freeman	Australian tour with STC	
2005	Old Times	Kate	Wharf Theatre, Sydney with STC	
2008	The Great	Catherine the Great	STC	
2018	Killing Katie: Confessions of a Book Club		Ensemble Theatre, Sydney	
2025	The Spare Room	Nicola	Belvoir St Theatre, Sydney	

=== As director ===
Year	Title	Role	Notes	Ref.
1980	The Maids	Director	Melbourne Athenaeum with MTC	
1980	Shorts	Lead	King O'Malley Theatre Company	
1981	The Woman Tamer	Director	Stables Theatre, Sydney with King O'Malley Theatre Company & STC	

== Quote ==
If fame just means 540 people a night then that's what it is, for the time being. Next week it could be millions of people and the week after that it could be none. That's what life is, you have to accept what you choose to do.
