= Sebastian and the Sparrow =

- Directed by: Scott Hicks
- Starring: Jeremy Angerson; Alexander Bainbridge; Elizabeth Alexander; Robert Coleby
- Release date: 1988
- Country: Australia
- Language: English
- Budget: A$700,000

Sebastian and the Sparrow is a 1988 Australian film directed by Scott Hicks. Hicks says he wanted to make the film one he could watch with his teenage son:

It was a kind of junior buddy movie with the theme of two people who envied each other's life. To Sebastian, Sparrow has the perfect life: nobody's on his back, he can do what he likes. It looks like glorious freedom. But to Sparrow the constraints of that life are very real. There is Sebastian with the luxury of a home, a family and a very well-to-do existence which was Nirvana to him. I love the way those thoughts could jostle together.

== Cast ==
- Alexander Bainbridge as Sebastian Thornbury
- Heather Kelly-Laws as The Captain
- Jeremy Angerson as 'Sparrow'
- Robert Coleby as Peter Thornbury
- Elizabeth Alexander as Jenny Thornbury
- Vincent Gil as Mick, a streetworker
- John Clayton as Country cop
- Alice Ramsay as Maude
- Jethro Heysen-Hicks as Jethro
- Chris Roberts as Turbo
- Peter Crossley as Red
- Patrick Frost as School teacher
- Grant Piro
- Brenton Whittle

Many of the outdoor scenes were filmed on location in Port Adelaide, where much of Hicks's acclaimed Shine was filmed.

== Reception ==
Despite some enthusiasm by critics ("An absolute charmer. Should not be missed." - Stan James) the film was not commercially successful, which Hicks blames on poor distribution. It was released on VHS tape by the Home Cinema Group but has not to date made it to DVD.
