= Waiting for God (TV series) =

British TV sitcom (1990–1994)

- Genre: Sitcom
- Created by: Michael Aitkens
- Starring: Stephanie Cole; Graham Crowden; Daniel Hill; Janine Duvitski
- Country of origin: United Kingdom
- Original language: English
- No. of series: 5
- No. of episodes: 47 (including 2 Specials)

Production
- Running time: 46x30 minutes 1x45 minutes

Original release
- Network: BBC1
- Release: 28 June 1990 – 27 October 1994

Waiting for God is a British sitcom that ran on BBC1 from 28 June 1990 to 27 October 1994 starring Graham Crowden as Tom and Stephanie Cole as Diana, two spirited residents of a retirement home who spend their time running rings around the home's oppressive management and their own families. It was written by Michael Aitkens.

The show became very successful, running for five series. The programme is still repeated in the UK on various channels, most notably Gold and Drama. Series one to five have run (and in some cases continue to run) on PBS in the United States, and in New Zealand the show has aired various times since 2002. In 2004, it came 37th in the poll for Britain's Best Sitcom.

== Plot ==
Set at the fictional Bayview Retirement Home near Bournemouth, the show is based on Diana Trent and her relationship with Tom Ballard, a former accountant with semi-feigned dementia. He has been exiled there for the convenience of his family.

Diana is a cynical, retired photojournalist who has found herself consigned to the retirement home after a career documenting some of the 20th century's most dangerous events has left her single and with no one in her life outside of her niece, and later, her grand-niece. Her frustration at the prospect of years of being alternately patronised and ignored at Bayview is soon channelled into attempts to subvert the régime of the retirement home and taunting the staff regarding their flaws and corrupt nature. Though retired, Diana remains connected with several powerful journalists, which she uses to blackmail the board of directors at Bayview (and Bayview manager Harvey Bains) to allow her to stay in Bayview despite her disruptive behaviour. Her only known living relatives are her niece Sarah and later, Sarah's daughter Diana. Sarah runs a modelling agency and loves Diana, though Diana is emotionally distant from her niece, going so far as to tell people that her niece runs a prostitution ring and constantly attempts to kill her with poison. Her nickname for Sarah is 'The Clapham Strangler'. As the series progresses, the two become closer after Sarah undergoes a whirlwind courtship and marriage that results in pregnancy; the marriage fails but produces "the Diana of the Future," as the new Grand-Aunt Diana blesses the newborn. Just before Baby Diana arrives, the grand-aunt-to-be reveals that much of her hostility towards the world stems from the fact that she is infertile; this incapability is one of her very few regrets in life.

Tom is a kindly but deluded old duffer who frequently lives in a fantasy world following his retirement as an accountant. A widower for at least a decade, his increasingly eccentric behaviour leads his alcoholic and adulterous daughter-in-law Marion and henpecked son Geoffrey to move him into Bayview where he finds himself living next door to Diana. The two form an unlikely partnership and discover that they are able to wreak havoc amongst the younger staff and management in the home in order to create a more tolerable living environment for themselves and their fellow residents. Tom's optimistic, cheery demeanour and unencumbered Anglican Christianity contrast Diana's dark cynicism and avowed atheism, as both attempt to influence the other's world view.

The manager of Bayview is Harvey Bains, who runs the establishment with his assistant, the homely, spinsterish and pious Jane Edwards. Bains is a penny-pinching weasel whose management style involves trying to run the retirement home profitably while keeping the residents (whom he variously dubs "oldies", "inmates", "units", "wrinklies', or "droolers") passive in order to make himself look good before the eyes of the board of directors.

Both Tom and Diana refer to Bains as "the idiot Bains", a reference to Harvey's general lack of common sense regarding his various schemes to promote himself and Bayview to the outside world.

Jane, Harvey's put-upon assistant, is a naïve and religious woman who is madly in love with Harvey, in spite of Harvey's utter disdain for her. Jane serves as a foil for Diana; although Diana loathes Jane's religious piety and optimistic outlook on life, she seems to genuinely care about Jane's wellbeing, as evidenced by her and Tom's attempts to help Jane when it comes to the matter of dealing with Harvey's manipulation of Jane's love for him.

During the third series, Tom and Diana get together as a couple after a one-night stand, though Diana is far more casual about the new state of their relationship, much to the chagrin of Tom, who wants a committed relationship. In series four, Diana's financial situation collapses and Tom discovers that his room is infested with damp. Tom forces Harvey to upgrade him to a new apartment in Bayview and allow Diana to live with him as his lady friend. By series five, the two become engaged along with Harvey and Jane, who first get together as part of a cynical scheme to get Harvey accepted into an exclusive country club. When the plan fails, and Jane responds by quitting her job to begin the process of becoming a nun, Harvey realises that he has come to enjoy Jane being in his life and the two go through with their vows. But Diana gets cold feet regarding her impending marriage to Tom (much to her niece Sarah's shock). Tom discovers this before the wedding and saves Diana from having to either go through with the wedding or have her niece sever all ties with her aunt, by calling off the wedding just as the two were about to say "I Do".

Much of the humour is derived from flying in the face of conventional expectations about how the elderly ought to behave in their old age and how many of the residents do not want to settle down. One character, Basil Makepeace, is forever propositioning the female residents of the home, bragging about his innumerable conquests (on one occasion he muses about the indignities of growing old, commenting that now "three or four times...a night is all I can manage"). As an octogenarian, he does quite well. The other source of humour comes from the lengths that Harvey Bains will go to in his quest for success and how he and Marion scheme to separate Tom and Diana, the two blights on their mutual existences. The series is also unusual in that it is told largely from the vantage point of the (largely well adjusted) elderly characters, with most of the younger characters depicted as buffoons, who are either neurotic or inept.

== Cast ==
Diana Trent (Stephanie Cole) – A curmudgeonly old woman who constantly complains about the state of the world and the way the elderly are treated. If someone tries to insult her, she sees it as a compliment because she sees it as being the only way to stay alive. A constant thorn in Bayview manager Harvey's side, Diana often irritates those around her with her bleak outlook, and admits it is the only thing that keeps her going; however, it is borne out of a genuine sense of right and wrong, and she can be ferocious when protecting those she cares about (particularly Tom and her niece Sarah). Diana is a retired photojournalist, having specialised in combat zones, with the things she has seen contributing to her pessimistic world view. She also takes great pleasure in making other people's lives miserable, with stunts such as "stealing" her niece's red Porsche. Although Diana is a pensioner, Cole was just 48 when she took the role.

Tom Ballard (Graham Crowden) – An optimistic, jolly old man; in many ways the polar opposite of Diana. However, he shares her sense of justice (and her enjoyment of troublemaking) and the two become good friends (but often with an uneasy relationship). Tom affects a mild dementia and frequently takes imaginary trips to other places (mentally checking out of the retirement home), telling tall tales of his exploits, often involving celebrities. This is to make up for his boring life as an accountant. Although he seems like a 'daffy old coot', when the chips are down he always knows exactly what is going on and has already worked out the best way to handle the problem. His dull son, Geoffrey, and Geoffrey's annoying, offensive wife, Marion (who have a financial stake in Bayview), often visit him despite Marion's reluctance. Tom, however, has the measure of both of them.

Jane Edwards (Janine Duvitski) – Harvey's prudish, homely and devout Catholic assistant who always looks on the bright side of life, despite Diana's constant attempts to bring her down to earth. She often thinks up new ideas for the home, often backed up by Tom, and whilst Diana is irritated by Jane much of the time, she recognises the good in her and more than once protects her from Harvey's attempts to get rid of her. Jane has an unrequited passion for Harvey, whom she often touches on the shoulder, to which Harvey replies disgustedly, 'Jane... you're touching me'. She is often shocked by what Diana says, with 'Oh Diana!!' becoming something of a catchphrase. A sensitive person, she often ends up running away in tears if anyone mentions anything about Harvey having a relationship with someone other than her or her never getting married.

Harvey Bains (Daniel Hill) – The greedy, vain manager of Bayview who constantly tries to cut costs, with the money saved usually going into his own pocket. He complains that the "oldies" aren't "efficient units" and would happily get rid of them all – especially Diana, who constantly thwarts his budget-slashing schemes. Although constantly pursued by Jane, Harvey is largely oblivious to this (or else ignores it), preferring the idea of a more glamorous female companion. His plain-spoken mother, Esme Sutherland (played by Vilma Hollingbery), whom he considers 'common', appears in one episode of Series 3, in which it is also mentioned that he has a sister. His father, whom he never knew, was an American gangster. He wears a wedding band.

Geoffrey Ballard (Andrew Tourell) – Tom's good-hearted but incredibly dull son, whose chief interests in life are DIY and real ale. He is a successful businessman, but his personal life is a disaster – he feels trapped in his marriage to the often vicious Marion, and will sometimes use his father as a sounding board. Geoffrey is frequently insulted by Diana, but is usually too meek to stand up to her, and largely tolerates her behaviour because of her affection for Tom. Geoffrey and Marion have two children, Tarquin and Sky, who appear in one episode of Series 3, in which they are very rude and obnoxious towards Tom, but are soon firmly put in their place by Diana. Inconsistently, there are 3 children in the car in the first episode as they take Tom to Bayview.

Marion Ballard (Sandra Payne) – Geoffrey's pill-popping, gin-swilling wife; a generally unpleasant woman who sees Tom purely as a financial burden. She is unfaithful to Geoffrey more than once, and uses alcohol and tranquilizers to escape from her financially secure but unexciting life. If she sees an opportunity to kiss another man, even if Geoffrey is around, she will do it. Marion later leaves Geoffrey for New Age philosophies (along with the equally troubled Reverend Dennis Sparrow), but does not last very long.

=== Minor characters ===
Basil Makepeace (Michael Bilton) – An elderly but very randy man who spends most of his time trying to seduce the female residents. He also boasts about his sexual conquests and is not shy about attempting to kiss women 60 years younger than himself, even though he is not very successful in this area. He has a girlfriend whom he does not marry, even though she wants to marry him. He also does not want to give up his crown as the resident sex symbol of Bayview. At the end of series 4, Michael Bilton died. Basil is referred to as travelling during the special, "Another Christmas at Bayview".

Jamie Edwards (Paddy Ward) – Jane's Irish grandfather, introduced in the special, "Another Christmas at Bayview" and continued through series 5.

Jenny (Dawn Hope) – A care worker at the home who, unlike Jane, sees through Harvey's dodgy ways, and often agrees with Diana's protests against the Bayview regime. Jenny has a daughter, Mandy, who is seen in one episode of Series 3.

Antonio (Chico Andrade) – A Portuguese gardener, often berated by Diana for his lack of skill. Diana normally speaks to him in pidgin French due to her inability to speak Portuguese (though Antonio shows no sign of understanding French).

Sarah Snow (later Parry) (Lucy Aston) – Diana's niece, who runs a successful modelling agency in London. Diana usually feigns indifference to Sarah, but it is obvious that deep down she cares very much for her. Sarah marries the crooked businessman Sam Parry (Christopher Bowen) during Series 2: the marriage does not last long, but it does result in Sarah having a child. The baby girl is the apple of Diana's eye and is named 'Diana' after her great-aunt. Sarah calls Diana "Aunty". Diana hates the term and constantly says, "Don't call me 'Aunty'."

The Reverend Dennis Sparrow (Tim Preece) – The world-weary and inept local vicar, who becomes a semi-regular character from Series 3 onwards, and can generally be relied on to make a hopeless mess of any church service that he attempts to conduct. Marion runs away with him to explore New Age philosophies at the beginning of Series 3, although this does not last long.

== Location ==
Although the series is set in Bournemouth, the location filming for the first three series was largely carried out in and around Brighton and Worthing. The first genuine appearance of Bournemouth town centre and the nearby suburb of Boscombe is in the 1992 Christmas special.

Most exterior scenes at the retirement home were filmed at and around the Oaken Holt Rest Home in Farmoor, Oxfordshire.

== Music ==
Waiting for God's theme music is from the middle of the fifth movement of Schubert's Trout Quintet, when the first theme is recapitulated in E, performed by the Nash Ensemble. Other music heard in the show included the third movement, also performed by the Nash Ensemble.

== Derived work ==
It was announced in 2013 that series creator Michael Aitkens would be staging a play, Heaven Forbid!, based on Waiting for God, at The Hawaii Theatre, starring Patty Duke and actor and TV newscaster Joe Moore.

In April 2017 a theatre version, also called Waiting For God, written by series creator Michael Aitkens, premiered at the Broadway Cinema, in Letchworth Garden City. The play was directed by David Grindley and starred Jeffrey Holland as Tom and Nichola McAuliffe as Diana, featured Joanna Bending as Sarah Chase, David Benson as Geoffrey Ballard, Peter Cadden as Dennis Sparrow, Samuel Collings as Harvey Baines and Emily Pithon as Jane Edwards, as well as Corinna Marlowe and Anna Westlake. Holland replaced Roy Hudd, who withdrew from the production during rehearsals.

== Episodes ==
Forty-seven episodes were made, all starring Cole and Crowden. All episodes were written by Michael Aitkens and most were directed by Gareth Gwenlan. Five episodes of Series 2 were directed by Sue Bysh.

=== Series overview ===
Series	Episodes	Originally released	
Series	Episodes	First released	Last released
1	7	28 June 1990	9 August 1990
2	10	5 September 1991	7 November 1991
3	10	10 September 1992	12 November 1992
Special		23 December 1992	
4	10	9 September 1993	11 November 1993
Special		22 December 1993	
5	8	8 September 1994	27 October 1994

=== Series 1 (1990) ===
No. overall	No. in series	Title	Directed by	Written by	Original release date
1	1	"Welcome to Bayview"	Gareth Gwenlan	Michael Aitkens	28 June 1990
2	2	"A Trip to Brighton"	Gareth Gwenlan	Michael Aitkens	5 July 1990
3	3	"Cheering Up Tom"	Gareth Gwenlan	Michael Aitkens	12 July 1990
4	4	"The Christening"	Gareth Gwenlan	Michael Aitkens	19 July 1990
5	5	"Fraulein Mueller"	Gareth Gwenlan	Michael Aitkens	26 July 1990
6	6	"The Psychiatrist"	Gareth Gwenlan	Michael Aitkens	2 August 1990
7	7	"The Helicopter"	Gareth Gwenlan	Michael Aitkens	9 August 1990

=== Series 2 (1991) ===
No. overall	No. in series	Title	Directed by	Written by	Original release date
8	1	"Counselling for the Dying"	Gareth Gwenlan	Michael Aitkens	5 September 1991
9	2	"The Partition"	Sue Bysh	Michael Aitkens	12 September 1991
10	3	"Daisy Takes Charge"	Gareth Gwenlan	Michael Aitkens	19 September 1991
11	4	"The Thief"	Sue Bysh	Michael Aitkens	26 September 1991
12	5	"Tell the Truth"	Sue Bysh	Michael Aitkens	3 October 1991
13	6	"The Hip Operation"	Gareth Gwenlan	Michael Aitkens	10 October 1991
14	7	"Glamorous Grannies"	Sue Bysh	Michael Aitkens	17 October 1991
15	8	"Foreign Workers"	Sue Bysh	Michael Aitkens	24 October 1991
16	9	"Young People"	Gareth Gwenlan	Michael Aitkens	31 October 1991
17	10	"The Boring Son"	Gareth Gwenlan	Michael Aitkens	7 November 1991

=== Series 3 (1992) ===
No. overall	No. in series	Title	Directed by	Written by	Original release date
18	1	"The Funeral"	Gareth Gwenlan	Michael Aitkens	10 September 1992
19	2	"Two Nasty Children"	Gareth Gwenlan	Michael Aitkens	17 September 1992
20	3	"Looking for Work"	Gareth Gwenlan	Michael Aitkens	24 September 1992
21	4	"Harvey's Fiancée"	Gareth Gwenlan	Michael Aitkens	1 October 1992
22	5	"The Estate Agent"	Gareth Gwenlan	Michael Aitkens	8 October 1992
23	6	"Scandal"	Gareth Gwenlan	Michael Aitkens	15 October 1992
24	7	"Sabotage"	Gareth Gwenlan	Michael Aitkens	22 October 1992
25	8	"Politics"	Gareth Gwenlan	Michael Aitkens	29 October 1992
26	9	"Sleeping Pills"	Gareth Gwenlan	Michael Aitkens	5 November 1992
27	10	"Great-Aunt Diana"	Gareth Gwenlan	Michael Aitkens	12 November 1992
Special
28	S	"Christmas at Bayview"	Gareth Gwenlan	Michael Aitkens	23 December 1992

=== Series 4 (1993) ===
No. overall	No. in series	Title	Directed by	Written by	Original release date
29	1	"Financial Difficulties"	Gareth Gwenlan	Michael Aitkens	9 September 1993
30	2	"Living Together"	Gareth Gwenlan	Michael Aitkens	16 September 1993
31	3	"Living in Miserable Sin"	Gareth Gwenlan	Michael Aitkens	23 September 1993
32	4	"Shelves"	Gareth Gwenlan	Michael Aitkens	30 September 1993
33	5	"The Seance"	Gareth Gwenlan	Michael Aitkens	7 October 1993
34	6	"The Promotional Video"	Gareth Gwenlan	Michael Aitkens	14 October 1993
35	7	"Adult Education"	Gareth Gwenlan	Michael Aitkens	21 October 1993
36	8	"Sent to Coventry"	Gareth Gwenlan	Michael Aitkens	28 October 1993
37	9	"Waterworks"	Gareth Gwenlan	Michael Aitkens	4 November 1993
38	10	"The Conference"	Gareth Gwenlan	Michael Aitkens	11 November 1993
Special
39	S	"Another Christmas at Bayview"	Gareth Gwenlan	Michael Aitkens	23 December 1993

=== Series 5 (1994) ===
No. overall	No. in series	Title	Directed by	Written by	Original release date
40	1	"After the Operation"	Gareth Gwenlan	Michael Aitkens	8 September 1994
41	2	"The Bayview Conservation Society"	Gareth Gwenlan	Michael Aitkens	15 September 1994
42	3	"A Royal Visit?"	Gareth Gwenlan	Michael Aitkens	22 September 1994
43	4	"Diana's Diet"	Gareth Gwenlan	Michael Aitkens	29 September 1994
44	5	"Trouble with Men"	Gareth Gwenlan	Michael Aitkens	6 October 1994
45	6	"Harvey the Priest"	Gareth Gwenlan	Michael Aitkens	13 October 1994
46	7	"Bungee Jumping"	Gareth Gwenlan	Michael Aitkens	20 October 1994
47	8	"A Double Wedding?"	Gareth Gwenlan	Michael Aitkens	27 October 1994

== Home media ==
Series	Release date			Rating	
Series	Region 1	Region 2	Region 4	BBFC	ACB
1	13 June 2006	6 March 2006	6 June 2007	12	PG
2	12 June 2007	15 May 2006	3 April 2008	12	PG
3	10 June 2008	21 August 2006	5 March 2009	12	PG
4	9 June 2009	9 October 2006	4 March 2010	12	PG
5	25 May 2010	12 February 2007	3 March 2011	12	PG
1–5	25 May 2010	15 October 2018	TBA	12	—N/a

== See also ==
- British sitcom
- Last of the Summer Wine, a sitcom about a trio of elderly men and their youthful misadventures.
- One Foot in the Grave, a sitcom about the tribulations of a retired security guard.
- Still Game, a sitcom set around two Glaswegian pensioners.
- You're Only Young Twice, a sitcom set in a retirement home.
