= List of Mother and Son episodes =

The following is an episode list of the Australian situation comedy Mother and Son which originally aired on ABC TV from 16 January 1984 until 21 March 1994.

The first DVD release for home use in Australia was in 2003 with a "best of" selection of nine stories titled "Mother & Son". Four more DVDs were released in succeeding years until every episode had been published, albeit in no clear sequence.

Mother and Son: The Complete Series 1–6 (6 Disc Box Set) was released on 7 November 2007.

== Series overview ==
| Season | Episodes | Originally aired | | DVD Release | |
| Season | Episodes | Season premiere | Season finale | Region 4 | |
|---|---|---|---|---|---|
| 1 | 7 | 16 January 1984 | 27 February 1984 | 7 November 2007 | 7 November 2007 |
| 2 | 7 | 4 March 1985 | 15 April 1985 | 7 November 2007 | 7 November 2007 |
| 3 | 7 | 24 December 1985 | 7 April 1986 | 7 November 2007 | 7 November 2007 |
| 4 | 7 | 1 February 1988 | 14 March 1988 | 7 November 2007 | 7 November 2007 |
| 5 | 7 | 10 February 1992 | 23 March 1992 | 7 November 2007 | 7 November 2007 |
| 6 | 7 | 7 February 1994 | 21 March 1994 | 7 November 2007 | 7 November 2007 |

== Season 1: 1984 ==
| # | Title | Original airdate | Production code |
|---|---|---|---|
| 1 | "The Home (also known as Maggie Takes a Holiday)" | 16 January 1984 | 101 |
In the series premiere, Arthur begins to finally consider putting Maggie in a nursing home after his wife leaves him. It is the first appearance of Arthur's former fiancé Deidre Beare (Suzanne Roylance). The episode also features a guest appearance of performer Colleen Clifford. This episode won an AWGIE.
| 2 | "The Milk" | 23 January 1984 | 102 |
Arthur is forced to miss work after he sends Maggie out to buy some milk and she returns three hours later, still without the milk. Arthur then discovers that Maggie has been pretending to have a broken wrist to be eligible for meals on wheels during the day. Miscommunication between the meals on wheels volunteer and Arthur causes the volunteer to think that it is Maggie who is caring for Arthur and she informs a social worker, concerned that Maggie must care for her son when she has a broken wrist.
| 3 | "The Oysters" | 30 January 1984 | 103 |
Arthur discovers Maggie arriving home in a garbage truck and making a nuisance at the local hospital. This forces Arthur to tell Maggie not to go out during the day, to no avail. She is then arrested for shoplifting some oysters, and Arthur and Robert must find out a way to prevent her from being sent to jail. This episode won an AWIGE, in addition to a Penguin Award. Although this episode aired third in the series, it was the first episode to be written. After much revision, the final script of this episode was written in June 1983. It was originally titled "Maggie Alone".
| 4 | "The Tickets" | 6 February 1984 | 104 |
Arthur tries his best to get out of the house and away from Maggie for a holiday with a new girlfriend but a series of misunderstandings leads his ex-wife Deidre to believe he wants to take her on the holiday, while Maggie tries to thwart Arthur. While Arthur's girlfriend is waiting outside in the car, Robert steals her from his brother by promising to take her on a trip to Noumea.
| 5 | "The Babysitter" | 13 February 1984 | 105 |
After spending several Saturday nights at home with Maggie, Arthur questions why he does not have a girlfriend. So he makes a date with Deidre, prompting Maggie to inform him she hates being left alone at night. Arthur arranges for Robert's babysitter to look after Maggie, but Maggie makes life difficult for the babysitter, in turn causing problems for Arthur and Deidre's night.
| 6 | "The Boyfriend" | 20 February 1984 | 106 |
It is Maggie's birthday and the entire family gets together to celebrate. Maggie sees the family gathering as the perfect chance to bring home her new boyfriend and tells Arthur she would like to marry again. However, she keeps forgetting her boyfriend's name, Arthur and Robert fight over Liz, and Maggie injures her boyfriend by causing an oven explosion.
| 7 | "The Illness" | 27 February 1984 | 107 |
Maggie thinks she is dying and finally wonders what to do about her will. After discovering Robert wants to sell the family home, she anxiously wishes to change her will. But finding the will is a problem for her and Arthur, who is looking for his own flat to live in. Maggie tries to force Arthur to not move alone by threatening to disinherit him. Her illness and severe incoherence is also an act designed to manipulate her sons. Meanwhile, Robert is trying to trick into letting him exercise power of attorney over the estate so that he can strip Arthur of his share of the inheritance.

== Season 2: 1985 ==
| # | Title | Original airdate | Production code |
|---|---|---|---|
| 8 | "The Money" | 4 March 1985 | 201 |
Maggie receives a letter from the government investigating why she has not cashed in her pension cheques. Arthur discovers she has been hiding the cheques around the house, and when Maggie adds them up they find out that it is a substantial sum of money. It is temporarily misplaced for a while when Maggie soaks them in the teapot. This is convenient for Arthur, who is looking for a loan to buy Robert's old car. Robert had originally offered it for AUD4000, but raises his price to AUD5000 when he realises this is how much money Maggie has. Arthur and Robert's plans are interrupted when Maggie attempts to cash in the cheques at the bank and a misunderstanding occurs with where the money will be deposited.
| 9 | "The Divorce" | 11 March 1985 | 202 |
Arthur is finalising divorce proceedings with his ex-wife Deidre, much to Maggie's consternation who believes a married couple are married for life. At the same time, Robert comes to stay overnight after his wife discovers he is having an affair with his dental assistant and hits him on the head. Maggie blames Arthur for spreading a culture of divorce. She then stirs up the dispute when Liz arrives by falsely implicating Arthur in an affair with Liz.
| 10 | "The Funeral" | 18 March 1985 | 203 |
The Beare family attend the funeral of Arthur and Robert's Uncle Andrew. Along the way to the funeral, Maggie stops the procession to buy a bag of oranges on sale, which she later drops accidentally into the open grave. Returning home with Arthur's other uncle, Tom, Maggie forgets his name repeatedly and gives him a cup of tea, with many cubes of sugar or saccharin. Tom then collapses on the couch and dies, and Maggie and the brothers argue over what to do with the body. Maggie brings another bag of oranges to the funeral, this time not dropping them. This episode won an AWIGE, in addition to a Penguin Award.
| 11 | "The Promotion" | 25 March 1985 | 204 |
Arthur is offered a new job doing press relations for the ruling Australian Labor Party of Prime Minister Bob Hawke, which will involve moving to Canberra. Trying to convince Maggie to move with him proves harder than anticipated, however. Robert tries to thwart Arthur so that he will have to stay in Sydney to look after Maggie, who then sprays paint on Arthur's shirt on the morning of the interview instead of water before ironing it. Arthur is awarded the job and although Maggie encourages him beforehand, she faints and is hospitalised. She tells Arthur that she only told him to go to Canberra to test his attitude towards her.
| 12 | "The Aunt" | 1 April 1985 | 205 |
Arthur invites Maggie's younger sister Lorna to stay for a visit, hoping that she can look after Maggie and allow Arthur time to go out with his new girlfriend Wendy. However, Maggie is far from pleased at having her sister stay with them, excoriating Lorna arbitrarily and accusing her of stealing various things. Later Maggie tries to drive Lorna off by washing all the bedsheets in the house and loudly singing and playing the piano at midnight. Later the pair turn up and crash Arthur's date.
| 13 | "The Card Game" | 8 April 1985 | 206 |
Arthur invites some friends over for a card game, and Maggie disrupts his bath before the appointment, prompting them to vow never to speak to one another again. Later, Maggie is shocked that she will not be joining them in the game of poker. When the cards go missing, Maggie is the prime suspect, and she keeps on trying to deflect matters with references to Sao biscuits. Much to Arthur's surprise, Maggie becomes the centre of Arthur's friends' attention for the night. She tries to prevent them from playing by causing diversions such as singing and dancing, causing Arthur to feign illness to escape the embarrassment. Maggie then uses Arthur's money and defeats all the others, winning a large amount of money, and refuses to give Arthur any of the winnings. (Ray Meagher guest stars.)
| 14 | "The Morning After" | 15 April 1985 | 207 |
Arthur's girlfriend Wendy spends the night, shocking Maggie enough for her to walk out and threaten to move in with Robert and Liz. Robert tries to convince Arthur to take his girlfriend elsewhere and Maggie not to move in with him. Maggie moves out for half a day then threatens to move out each time Arthur finds a date. She then tells Arthur he needs to marry Wendy as soon as possible, claiming that Arthur has impregnated her and needs to avoid the scandal. When Wendy comes again, she tells Maggie she needs to move to Darwin to look after her sick mother, and has to break up, and Maggie is very pleased by this, but Arthur apparently not. However, the episode ends with the revelation that Wendy has spent another night in the Beare home.

== Season 3: 1985–1986 ==
| # | Title | Original airdate | Production code |
|---|---|---|---|
| 15 | "The Christmas Drinks" | 24 December 1985 | 301 |
It is a hot summer Christmas Eve and Arthur organises a party for his friends and family. But Maggie wants to spend Christmas Eve at church with her family, and erects a sign outside the house falsely proclaiming that a family member has died to keep the guests away. After only Arthur's friend Max—who was not invited and came after being kicked out of a drunken party for lewd behaviour—and Robert and Liz turn up, the latter with some very cheap presents, a series of incidents leads to an argument between them and they unexpectedly end up going to church. Max ingratiates himself by excoriating the others for their hostility to their relatives and offers to take Maggie to church, leading her to offer to adopt him.
| 16 | "The Sign" | 3 March 1986 | 302 |
Maggie is anxious about the whereabouts of her late husband. She finds solace in religion in the hope of eventually meeting her husband in heaven but Arthur becomes concerned about the lengths she is going to so that she is meeting God's approval.
| 17 | "The Picnic" | 10 March 1986 | 303 |
A day at the park with the whole family turns out to be a disaster when Maggie goes missing. The episode marks the first and only time Damien and Teonie Beare appear in the series.
| 18 | "The Accident" | 17 March 1986 | 304 |
A typewriter is accidentally dropped on Arthur's foot and he is forced to stay at home to recover. Maggie immediately wants to be Arthur's carer, to Arthur's dismay. Arthur sends Maggie out to buy him a sandwich and she ends up in a baby clinic and then the hospital where she meets somebody.
| 19 | "The Last Will" | 24 March 1986 | 305 |
Maggie prepares her will and Arthur is shocked when Robert stands to inherit most of Maggie's assets and all Arthur is left with is a million-dollar-prize lottery ticket. This episode won an AWIGE, in addition to a Penguin Award.
| 20 | "The Neighbours" | 31 March 1986 | 306 |
A feud arises between Maggie and her next door neighbour, a Greek immigrant. After an exchange of threats and property damage, Arthur and the next door neighbour's son decide to fix up their mothers' relationship.
| 21 | "The Cruise" | 7 April 1986 | 307 |
Maggie and her new friend Claude make plans to go on a cruise which surprises Arthur and Robert but not is all as it seems for Claude.

== Season 4: 1988 ==
| # | Title | Original airdate | Production code |
|---|---|---|---|
| 22 | "The Medals" | 1 February 1988 | 401 |
Maggie thinks it is Anzac Day and tries her hardest to go into town to see the parade but Arthur tries his hardest to convince her that it is not yet Anzac Day.
| 23 | "The Friend" | 8 February 1988 | 402 |
Arthur feels Maggie needs a friend after he discovers she has made up an imaginary friend. He hires a woman to act as a friend for her.
| 24 | "The Car" | 15 February 1988 | 403 |
Maggie wants to visit the place of her honeymoon and Arthur promises he will take her there by car one day but not immediately. The car then becomes the centre of attention when Robert wants to buy it off Maggie, forcing Arthur to find out a way to retain the car.
| 25 | "The Surprise" | 22 February 1988 | 404 |
Arthur, Maggie and Liz plan a surprise party for Robert's birthday but when Robert turns up late, Liz begins wondering if he is having another affair with one of her friends. This episode won a Pater Award.
| 26 | "The Dog" | 29 February 1988 | 405 |
Robert buys a puppy that Liz does not want and he gives it to Arthur and Maggie instead. The dog goes missing after Maggie leaves the back door open, much to Robert's dismay when he turns up the next day wanting the dog back because of Damien and Teonie's tantrums. Maggie then wonders what good she can do if she can no longer look after even a pet dog.
| 27 | "The Fridge" | 7 March 1988 | 406 |
The fridge needs to be fixed and Maggie is working on her memoirs with Arthur. After Arthur cannot come up with anything she gets Robert to help her but when she says she is going to get a present for Arthur, Robert begins to question his mother's love for him.
| 28 | "The Last Straw" | 14 March 1988 | 407 |
Arthur has had enough of Maggie's behaviour and he calls Robert demanding he come over as he is going to walk out on her and leave her in Robert's care. Arthur's plans change when he finds out that Robert is going to sell the house and put Maggie in a home.

== Season 5: 1992 ==
| # | Title | Original airdate | Production code |
|---|---|---|---|
| 29 | "The Deed" | 10 February 1992 | 501 |
Continuing from the previous episode, Arthur discovers that Robert has put Maggie in a home while he has been away on holiday. Arthur returns home in response to this and then finds out that Robert is continuing with his plan to acquire power of attorney over Maggie and sell her home. Robert and Maggie have a falling out over this, which causes problems for Arthur who wants to return to his holiday.
| 30 | "The Budgie" | 17 February 1992 | 502 |
Feeling that Maggie could use some companionship after the fight with Robert, Arthur brings home a friend's budgie for her to look after. Maggie runs into trouble when she accidentally kills the bird through excessive care and tries to avoid incurring Arthur's wrath by concealing this.
| 31 | "The Big Sleep" | 24 February 1992 | 503 |
Maggie starts to have trouble sleeping, keeping Arthur awake in turn. She begins making several arrangements for her death which prompts her to think about her husband's funeral, and how little she did for him.
| 32 | "The Clock" | 2 March 1992 | 504 |
Maggie takes a clock from her neighbour after believing it is one of hers that her neighbour has stolen. Arthur and Robert try to work out how the neighbour got the clock if it was originally Maggie's and they are forced to buy it off the neighbour when Maggie refuses to give it back. An inscription on the bottom of the clock settles the matter as to whose clock it originally was.
| 33 | "The Rest" | 9 March 1992 | 505 |
Arthur is feeling stressed from his carer's responsibilities regarding Maggie and tries to persuade her to stay in a respite facility for a couple of weeks so he can have some rest. Maggie is obstinate about this as usual, but Arthur manages to convince her to have a quick visit of the facility to see what it is like. However, the visit ends up being far more stressful for Arthur than Maggie when she goes off with one of the centre's residents when she is briefly left on her own and he and the centre's staff are unable to locate her.
| 34 | "The Baby" | 16 March 1992 | 506 |
Arthur is dismayed to come home one evening to discover Maggie looking after a baby. Maggie refuses to explain whose baby it is, causing Arthur to fear that Maggie might have unintentionally kidnapped it. Meanwhile, Robert asks Arthur if anything has arrived for him from a woman, leading Arthur to think that the baby might actually be Robert's love child.
| 35 | "The Sunday Roast" | 23 March 1992 | 507 |
Arthur wants to bring home a girlfriend for a Sunday lunch and to appease Maggie he tells her that she is a distant cousin. Although Robert goes along with the idea, Liz is less keen, and they have difficulty keeping the secret from Maggie.

== Season 6: 1994 ==
| # | Title | Original airdate | Production code |
|---|---|---|---|
| 36 | "The Ride" | 7 February 1994 | 601 |
It seems that Robert has turned over a new leaf when he takes Maggie out for a drive, but he in fact takes Maggie to the home of a woman with whom he is having an affair. After leaving Maggie in the car, she gets out looking for Robert after he is gone for some time and Robert cannot find her when he returns. He and Liz start searching for her but the mystery woman is discovered by Liz during the search with disastrous consequences for Robert.
| 37 | "The Trip" | 14 February 1994 | 602 |
Maggie's younger sister Lorna invites Maggie on a trip with her to England. Arthur is overjoyed at the prospect of having time on his own while Maggie is away. He becomes worried when Maggie and Lorna get into a fight before they leave, threatening the holiday from going ahead.
| 38 | "The Family Feud" | 21 February 1994 | 603 |
Continuing from the previous episode, Robert has moved in with Arthur after Liz kicked him out of his home because of the affair, ruining Arthur's time on his own while Maggie and Lorna have been away. When the sisters return home, Arthur is surprised to find the sisters are not speaking because of something Lorna said about him while on the holiday. This prompts a family meeting and everyone surprisingly turns on Arthur, who discovers what his family really thinks of him.
| 39 | "The Caravan" | 28 February 1994 | 604 |
In the concluding episode of the three-episode arc, a bitter fight erupts when Arthur finds out that Maggie is entering Robert in a favourite son contest. Arthur moves into Robert's caravan parked outside the house. However, it ends up being a bad experience for Arthur after being towed away while being inside it.
| 40 | "The Lamingtons" | 7 March 1994 | 605 |
Without knowing it, Maggie promises to make 216 lamingtons for various groups at a cake stall and at the same time must undertake jury duty.
| 41 | "The Promise" | 14 March 1994 | 606 |
Arthur tries to get Maggie to become more independent after he finds out that he has an illness and might not be able to care for her anymore. Robert tells Maggie that Arthur is dying in an effort to get her to be more co-operative, and she does her utmost to help around the house to support Arthur. Her efforts prove counterproductive, however.
| 42 | "The Ring Cycle" | 21 March 1994 | 607 |
In the series finale, Arthur and Deidre appear to be getting back together and Arthur hopes Maggie will accept it. Arthur tries to get her to go to Robert and Liz's for one night so he and Deidre can sort things out. Arthur's plans go awry when first Maggie misplaces her wedding ring and insists on finding it and then Arthur finds out that Robert hasn't told Liz that Maggie will be coming over. At the end of the episode, Arthur and Deidre end up getting back together, which ends the series.

== Mother & Son DVD series ==
A collection of nine episodes, titled "Mother & Son" was released on DVD by Roadshow Entertainment in 2004 and distributed by ABC Merchandising. Although touted on the box as "stories from Series 1" they were all from Series 2 and 3. Another four DVDs with titles "Mother & Son Volume 2" to "Mother & Son Volume 5" were released by the same organizations between 2004 and 2007. It may be observed that the three-part story that began with "The Trip" and ended with "The Caravan" was published out of sequence in Volumes 2 and 3. Volume 5 comprised the remaining six stories, most from Season 1.

| DVD name | Title | Season | Original airdate |
|---|---|---|---|
| Mother & Son | "The Money" | 2 | 4 March 1985 |
| Mother & Son | "The Aunt" | 2 | 1 April 1985 |
| Mother & Son | "The Accident" | 3 | 17 March 1986 |
| Mother & Son | "The Card Game" | 2 | 8 April 1985 |
| Mother & Son | "The Promotion" | 2 | 25 March 1985 |
| Mother & Son | "The Funeral" | 2 | 18 March 1985 |
| Mother & Son | "The Picnic" | 3 | 10 March 1986 |
| Mother & Son | "The Last Will" | 3 | 24 March 1986 |
| Mother & Son | "The Cruise" | 3 | 7 April 1986 |
| Mother & Son vol. 2 | "The Morning After" | 2 | 15 April 1985 |
| Mother & Son vol. 2 | "The Christmas Drinks" | 3 | 24 December 1985 |
| Mother & Son vol. 2 | "The Dog" | 4 | 29 February 1988 |
| Mother & Son vol. 2 | "The Surprise" | 4 | 22 February 1988 |
| Mother & Son vol. 2 | "The Budgie" | 5 | 17 February 1992 |
| Mother & Son vol. 2 | "The Big Sleep" | 5 | 24 February 1992 |
| Mother & Son vol. 2 | "The Clock" | 5 | 2 March 1992 |
| Mother & Son vol. 2 | "The Ride" | 6 | 7 February 1994 |
| Mother & Son vol. 2 | "The Caravan" (pt3) | 6 | 28 February 1994 |
| Mother & Son vol. 3 | "The Nursing Home" | 1 | 16 January 1984 |
| Mother & Son vol. 3 | "The Babysitter" | 1 | 13 February 1984 |
| Mother & Son vol. 3 | "The Sign" | 3 | 3 March 1986 |
| Mother & Son vol. 3 | "The Neighbours" | 3 | 31 March 1986 |
| Mother & Son vol. 3 | "The Car" | 4 | 15 February 1988 |
| Mother & Son vol. 3 | "The Baby" | 5 | 16 March 1992 |
| Mother & Son vol. 3 | "The Trip" (pt1) | 6 | 14 February 1994 |
| Mother & Son vol. 3 | "The Family Feud" (pt2) | 6 | 21 February 1994 |
| Mother & Son vol. 3 | "The Lamingtons" | 6 | 7 March 1994 |
| Mother & Son vol. 4 | "The Boyfriend" | 1 | 20 February 1984 |
| Mother & Son vol. 4 | "The Divorce" | 2 | 11 March 1985 |
| Mother & Son vol. 4 | "The Medals" | 4 | 1 February 1988 |
| Mother & Son vol. 4 | "The Friend" | 4 | 8 February 1988 |
| Mother & Son vol. 4 | "The Last Straw" | 4 | 14 March 1988 |
| Mother & Son vol. 4 | "The Deed" | 5 | 10 February 1992 |
| Mother & Son vol. 4 | "The Rest" | 5 | 9 March 1992 |
| Mother & Son vol. 4 | "The Sunday Roast" | 5 | 23 March 1992 |
| Mother & Son vol. 4 | "The Promise" | 6 | 14 March 1994 |
| Mother & Son vol. 5 | "The Milk" | 1 | 23 January 1984 |
| Mother & Son vol. 5 | "The Oysters" | 1 | 30 January 1984 |
| Mother & Son vol. 5 | "The Tickets" | 1 | 6 February 1984 |
| Mother & Son vol. 5 | "The Illness" | 1 | 27 February 1984 |
| Mother & Son vol. 5 | "The Fridge" | 4 | 7 March 1988 |
| Mother & Son vol. 5 | "The Ring Cycle" | 6 | 21 March 1994 |
