= Anthony Crowley =

Australian playwright

Anthony Michael Crowley (born 3 July 1965) is an Australian playwright, composer, director, designer and educator. Musical Theatre works include Vincent: An Acapella Opera, Supernature, The Villain of Flowers, The Journey Girl, Nathaniel Storm, The Wild Blue, Tribe, Superfreaks, and Motor Mouth Loves Suck Face.

Crowley is known for his work in non-musical theatre. He has written several plays, including Pretty White Lies and the Velveteen Undertow, The Frail Man, When Sand Becomes Glass, Redemption and Shadow Passion.

== Early life and education ==
Crowley is the oldest of four children. From 1984 to 1987 he studied Graphic Design at Swinburne University. He graduated with a BA in Graphic Design in 1987.

== Career ==
=== Design ===
After graduating, Crowley worked as an Art Director at Clemenger/BBDO, a firm that specialised in print and television media. In 1988 Crowley successfully auditioned for the Melbourne Conservatorium in 1988 and shifted his focus toward theatre and the performing arts.

=== Theatre ===
Early in his theatre career, Crowley performed in numerous plays throughout Melbourne. He also began writing musicals and plays, starting with Vincent: An A’Capella Opera (1989–1991), collaborating with playwright and screenwriter Luke Devenish. After premiering at St Martins’s Theatre in 1990, Vincent: An A’Capella Opera drew the attention of Opera Australia, who offered Crowley a position in their Young Artist Program. In 1992 Crowley was awarded a scholarship from the Australian Musical Theatre Foundation sponsored by producer Cameron Mackintosh and travelled to London, England, where he spent time with The English National Opera and Andrew Lloyd Webber’s Really Useful Company.

He would collaborate with Devenish twice more on the musicals named Supernature (1992) and The Villain of Flowers (1994). The Australian Musical Theatre Foundation commissioned the latter, under the stewardship of renowned theatre director Jim Sharman and producer Michael Turkic in collaboration with the National Institute of Dramatic Art (NIDA) and premiered at NIDA’s Parade Theatre in Sydney.

Following the premiere of The Villain of Flowers, the Australian Broadcasting Corporation (ABC) took notice of the musical and broadcast the show in full on ABC Classic FM and included the song "Forgiven" from the musical in their television special Once in a Blue Moon. In 1996, NIDA awarded him a second commission. This time, to create the music, lyrics and book for Nathanial Storm, produced by the NIDA Company in 1997.

His next musical, The Journey Girl, adapted letters written by his sister, author Cath Crowley, into a one-woman show starring Emma Powell. The Journey Girl premiered at the Yarraville Masonic Hall before going on to further productions at St. Martins Theatre in 1998 and the Atheneum Theatre in 1999.

After returning to Melbourne, Victoria, he initiated a musical theatre venture called The Wild Blue Project in 2002. That same year, Crowley penned the non-musical play, The Frail Man, which won The Wal Cherry Play of the Year in 2002 and the Malcolm Robertson Prize in 2003 before premiering at the Malthouse Theatre (Playbox) in 2004. In 2005 The Frail Man won the ANPC/New Dramatists Prize and was presented as a rehearsed reading in New York. Later, the 2005 Victorian Premier’s Literary Awards shortlisted the play for the Louis Esson Prize for Drama.

Between 2005 and 2007, Crowley returned to St Martin's Youth Arts Centre as Artistic Director. During this time, in addition to another production of The Wild Blue, Crowley created and directed numerous original productions, including Picasso’s Children, When Sand Becomes Glass, Pretty White Lies and the Velveteen Undertow and Motor-mouth and Suck-face: An Apocalyptic Love Story, which would eventually evolve into his 2016 musical, Motor Mouth Loves Suck Face: An Apocalyptic Musical. In 2007 his new play Shadow Passion premiered at Chapel off Chapel Theatre in Prahran.

Following his departure from St Martins Youth Arts Centre, Crowley worked with fellow Australian composer Mark Jones on a new musical titled Carnival Joe.

From 2009 to 2011, he collaborated with Broadway composer Henry Krieger and director Robert Longbottom on RISE, a musical about televangelist Tammy Faye Bakker, written for Broadway star Kristin Chenoweth.

In 2011, he became the Artistic Director of the Melbourne Short + Sweet Playwriting Festival and the Roola Boola Children's Arts Festival, for the City of Stonnington.

In 2013, Crowley collaborated with his then eleven-year-old daughter Ella on the cabaret entitled One Tacky Tree. The cabaret featured original songs. Later, the 2014 Junction Arts Festival in Launceston, Tasmania, selected the performance. The following year, he collaborated with his son Callum on a small theatre piece titled Wolf Boy and Zombie Dad for Melbourne’s Big West Festival. In 2016, he wrote and starred in his new play Redemption for La Mama Theatre, directed by Petra Kalive. In 2018 his musical version of Motor-mouth Loves Suck-face was included on the VCE Theatre Studies Playlist and played a season at La Mama Courthouse Melbourne.

=== Artist In Education ===
Between 2000 and 2005, Crowley created and directed several productions at Federation University and the Victorian College of the Arts. Whilst working with students at the VCA, he was commissioned to write and direct the musical Tribe. The following year, the VCA commissioned another musical, Superfreaks. Between 2012 and 2016 he was involved in several Artist In Schools Residencies.

In 2017 and then 2019 he undertook a Creative Learning Partnership working with Tempy Primary, a remote school in the Mallee district of Victoria, which he took again in 2021.

In July 2024 he and his eldest son Declan Crowley were award a State Library of Victoria Fellowship in Children's Storytelling and Literature.

== Awards and recognition ==
• Official Selection, VCE Theatre Studies Playlist, 2018, Motor-mouth Loves Suck-face; An Apocalyptic Musical.

• Winner of the Victorian Premier’s Literary Award, Best Music Theatre Script, 2008, The Wild Blue.

• Official Selection, VCE Drama Studies Playlist, 2006, The Wild Blue.

• Winner of the 2006 Pratt Prize for Musical Theatre.

• Winner of the 2005 Sumner Locke Elliot, New Dramatists Prize, New York Residency.

• Winner of the 2004 R.E. Ross Trust Award [Shadow Passion]

• Winner of the 2004 Malcolm Robertson Prize for Drama The Frail Man

• Winner of the 2002 Wal Cherry Play Of The Year Award The Frail Man

• Awarded a Young Artist Scholarship, Opera Australia, 1993, Sydney NSW.

• Awarded an Australian Musical Theatre Foundation Scholarship, 1992, U.K. Cameron Mackintosh, Really Useful Company, English National Opera.

• Winner of the 1998 Victorian Green Room Association Awards Award for Best Musical Direction.
