= Trial By Marriage =

1981 Australian television series

- Written by: Michael Aitkens
- Directed by: David Goldie; Leon Thau
- Starring: Peter Sumner; Jacki Weaver
- Country of origin: Australia
- Original language: English
- No. of seasons: 2
- No. of episodes: 13

Production
- Executive producer: John O'Grady
- Producer: David Goldie
- Running time: 30 minutes

Original release
- Network: ABC
- Release: August 18, 1980 – February 4, 1982

Trial By Marriage is an Australian television series that aired on ABC from 1980. It was a prequel to the Neutral Ground episode of Tickled Pink which featured Peter Sumner and Cornelia Frances as a divorcing couple. Trial By Marriage is set before the divorce and has Jacki Weaver taking over the role of the wife. The first series of 7 episodes began on 18 August airing on Mondays as 7:30pm. A second series began on 17 December 1981.

== Cast ==
- Peter Sumner as Bruce Jefferson
- Jacki Weaver as Joan Jefferson
- Terry Bader as Jacko

== Reception ==
Jacqueline Lee Lewes from the Sydney Morning Herald wrote "The sight gags are spelt out and unfortunately many of those genuinely witty lines are all but drowned out by the way they're shouted at the cameras. Weaver and Sumner are particularly guilty of this. The director David Goldie, should have stepped in and said, "Hey, cool it."" The same mastheads Clement Semmler called it a "cliche-worn and hackneyed so-called comedy". Keith Gossman in the Canberra Times criticised the dated format but said "Still, there were some very funny lines. The comedy was bitchy and, yes, you could almost say sophisticated. But it was not delivered in the same seamless manner which the British have perfected."

The Age's Kate Legge wrote of the second series "Apart from actress Jacki Weaver who is the practical joker of this husband and wife team, it has all the ingredients of a bad sitcom. Jokes that aren't funny, followed by canned laughter on cue, an improbable plot with plenty of hasty entrances and exits, pranks and tricky-dicky predicaments. It is so predicnble that even the most passive viewer can keep at least three steps ahead."
