= Martin Ball =

English actor (born 1964)

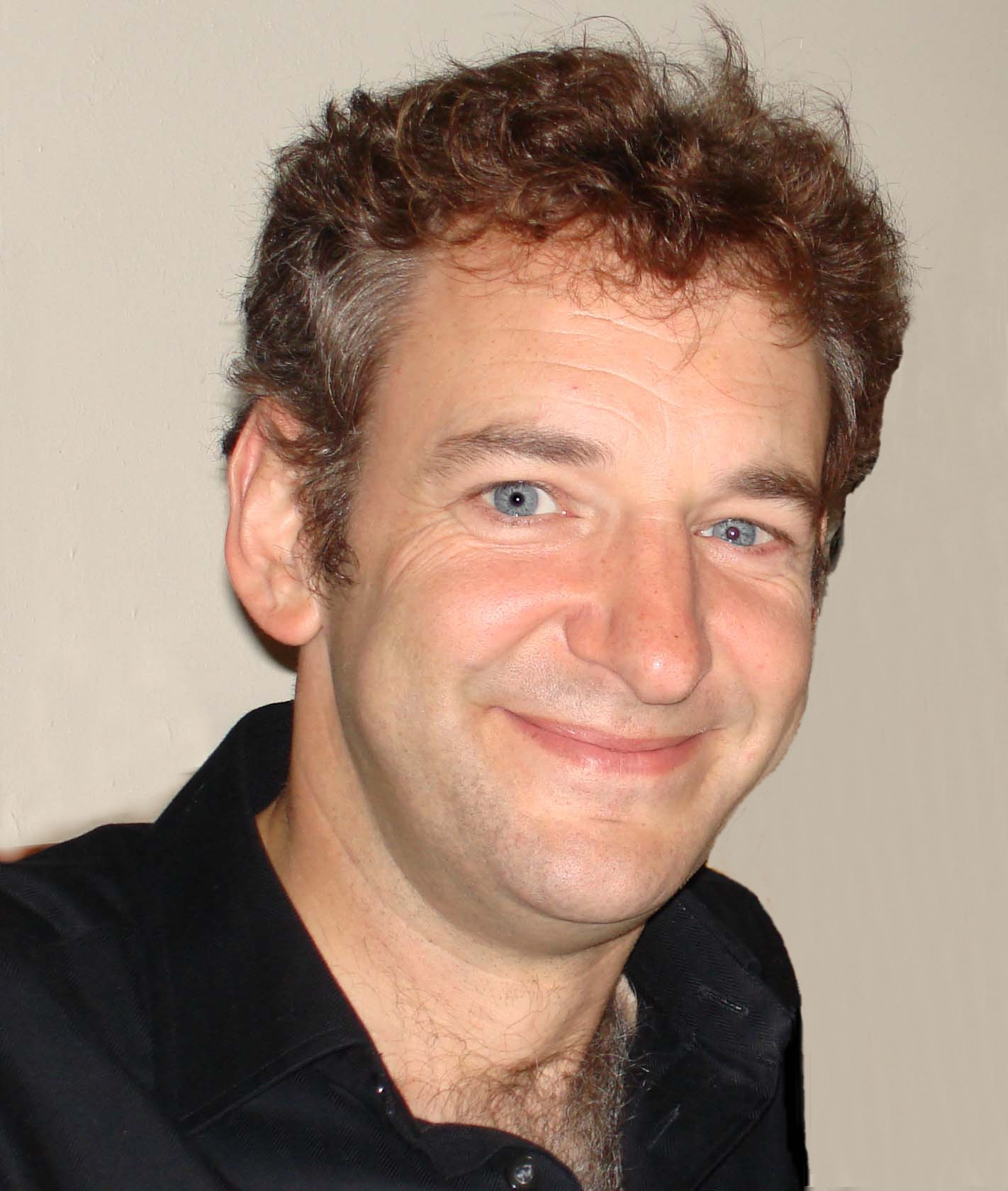
- Martin Ball in 2006
- Born: 10 October 1964 (age 61); Royal Tunbridge Wells, England
- Occupation: Musical theatre / TV actor

Martin Ball (born 10 October 1964) is an English theatre and television actor. He was born and grew up in Royal Tunbridge Wells in Kent. He trained at Webber Douglas Academy of Dramatic Art, and graduated in 1992.

== Career ==
His various theatre includes originating the role of Horace in Top Hat (First National Tour and at the Aldwych) alongside Tom Chambers and Summer Strallen, Andre and Firmin in The Phantom of the Opera, Thénardier in Les Misérables (Queen's), George Banks in Mary Poppins (Cameron Mackintosh tour, 2008 TMA Awards Best Supporting Actor in a Musical), Harry Bright in Mamma Mia!, Richard in Terry Johnson's Dead Funny at the Nottingham Playhouse; Colin in Alan Ayckbourn's Absent Friends, directed by Ayckbourn at his Stephen Joseph Theatre in Scarborough; Lord Fancourt Babberley in Charley's Aunt at the Crucible Theatre, Sheffield; Hortensio in The Taming of the Shrew at the Nuffield Theatre, Southampton; originating the role of Dr. Dillamond in the West End production of Wicked (a role he returned to as part of the show's 10th anniversary in 2016) and later playing the Wizard, and Algernon in The Importance of Being Earnest on a national tour.

Martin's television work includes playing Mr Steel, the Headmaster, in two series of Bernard's Watch; the twins' father in two series of Home Farm Twins; Andrew in two series of Keeping Mum; Dan McGill in two series of Chalk; Reverend Tim in Down To Earth; Dr Dave Masters in Casualty and Reverend Mordaunt in Little Lord Fauntleroy.

Other recent roles include Tim Frazier, QC in Family Affairs, Clive in Everything I Know About Men, Tim in Wild West, Dr. Harry in Strange, Paul, the games master in My Dad's The Prime Minister, Frank in Back Home, Robert in Preserves (three-hander with Phyllida Law and Elizabeth McGovern), Stephen Millar in The Bill, Henry in Human Remains, Dennis Cooke in Badger, Simon Mugham in The Missing Postman, Harper in Wycliffe, Jeff Hawkes in The Bill, Simon Lester in Anna Lee, Herr Koch in Genghis Cohen, a small part as Roger Davey in the 2008 Doctor Who series premiere "Partners in Crime" and Mark, a solicitor, in Summerhill a CBBC drama. Radio work includes Marlow in She Stoops to Conquer, Jeffrey (plus various other characters) in The Cricket Plays, and Brian Dixon in Clare in the Community, all for the BBC.

On 18 September 2018, Martin was announced to be playing Thénardier on the 2018/19 UK & Ireland tour of Les Misérables, beginning at the Leicester Curve. Ball played his final performance in the show on 16 November 2019, at the Mayflower Theatre in Southampton.

On 30 April 2021 he was cast as Maurice in the UK tour of Beauty and the Beast. The production transferred to the London Palladium at the West End for a limited engagement beginning June 2022.

== MusicalTalk ==
Martin Ball presented three episodes of MusicalTalk - The UK's Musical Theatre Podcast. Such topics discussed thus far by Martin include Wicked, "Stagedooring" and The Drowsy Chaperone.

== Personal life ==
Ball was once engaged to actress Letitia Dean, known for playing the role of Sharon Watts in the BBC soap opera EastEnders.
