= Geoffrey Atherden =

Australian television screenwriter and playwright

Geoffrey Atherden AM
- Born: Geoffrey John Atherden; Australia
- Other name: Geoff Atherden
- Education: Bachelor of Architecture, University of Sydney
- Occupations: Television screenwriter; Playwright
- Years active: 1971–present
- Known for: Mother and Son; Grass Roots; BabaKiueria

Geoffrey John Atherden AM, credited also as Geoff Atherden, is an Australian television screenwriter and playwright, especially of comedy. He is best known for creating the sitcom Mother and Son.

== Early life and education ==
Atherden attended the School of Architecture at University of Sydney in the 1960s. He trained as an architect.

== Architectural career ==
Atherden practised as an architect until he was in his mid-thirties. He worked for the architectural firm of McConnel Smith and Johnson, and was responsible for designing the Law Courts Building in Queens Square, Sydney.

== Writing career ==
In 1969, the founders of Producers Authors Composers and Talent (now PACT Centre for Emerging Artists) attended a Sydney University Architecture Revue, with sets by Atherden and Grahame Bond, and invited Bond, Atherden, Peter Weir and his friend, composer Peter Best, a chance to do a show at the National Art School's Cellblock Theatre. Sir Robert Helpmann saw the show and took it to the Adelaide Festival, and soon afterwards Weir and Bond were commissioned to write a Christmas special TV show for ABC Television, called Man on a Green Bike. Atherden was later a contributor to The Aunty Jack Show, which starred Bond. He was script editor on a four-part sketch series, Jokes, which ran on ABC-TV in early 1979. In the middle of the same year he scripted a seven-part comedy, One Day Miller. In 1981 he was writer on the series Ratbags (1981) and the soap opera Sons and Daughters the following year.

In 1976, Atherden designed sets for the rock opera Hero, produced by Bond.

Atherden has written a number of plays. Prior to working in television he wrote Balloon Dubloon – the revue in 1965 and theatre show in 1970. He then concentrated on screenwriting, but continuing in writing for theatre again from 1994 onwards, including Hotspur (1994) and Black Cockatoo (2020).

He is perhaps best known for creating and writing the sitcom Mother and Son, which ran for over 10 years (January 1984 to March 1994). Other work includes the comedy-drama Grass Roots and the mockumentary BabaKiueria.

== Other roles ==
Atherden served as the president of Australian Writers' Guild and Australian Writers' Foundation. In 2016, Atherden joined the Screenrights Board, which licenses secondary users of broadcast content, along with other secondary functions.

He has also served two terms on the board of Screen NSW.

== Recognition and awards ==
Atherden was appointed a Member of the Order of Australia on 26 January 2009, "For service to the television industry as a scriptwriter, and to the advancement of writers for performance through executive roles with professional organisations.".

Mother and Son won several awards.

== Television scripts ==
Production	Type	Year	Credit	Episodes	Notes
The Comedy Game	TV series	1971	Writer	1 episode: "Aunty Jack's Travelling Show"	Credited as "Geoff Atherden"
The Aunty Jack Show	TV series	1972	Writer	6 episodes: -"The Aunty Jack Radio Show" -"The Aunty Jack War Show" -"The Aunty Jack Kulture Show" -"The Aunty Jack Anonymous Show" -"The Aunty Jack Family Show" -"The Aunty Jack Horror Show"	Credited as "Geoff Atherden"
The Aunty Jack Show	TV series	1972	Writer	1 episode: "Unaired Pilot: Aunty Jack's Travelling Show"	Credited as "Geoff Atherden"
The Very Best of The Aunty Jack Show	TV special	1973	Writer		
The Of Show	TV series	1977	Writer	6 episodes: -Six of One -Half a Dozen of the Other -The Sound of Of Awards -Bake Of -Prince Of Seduction -Son of Man	
The Little Big Show	TV movie	1978	Screenwriter		
Tickled Pink	TV series	1978	Writer	1 episode: "One Day Miller"	
One Day Miller	TV series	1979	Writer	7 episodes: -Birthday -The Big Day -The First Day -Day Out -Moving Day -Long Day -New Say	
Jokes	TV series	1979	Writer		
Ratbags	TV series	1981		9 episodes: #1.1 through to #1.9	
Sons and Daughters	TV series	1982		5 episodes: #1.9; #1.17; #1.23; #1.39; #1.47	
BabaKiueria	TV short	1986	Screenplay		
Australians	TV series	1988		1 episode: "Jack Davey"	
Eggshells	TV series	1991	Writer		
Mother and Son	TV series	1981–1991	Creator and writer	42 episodes	
Dad and Dave	TV series	1985	Writer (additional material)		
Keeping Mum	TV series	1997–1998	Writer	16 episodes	
Grass Roots	TV series	2000–2003	Creator and writer	18 episodes	
Stepfather of the Bride	TV movie	2006	Written by		

== Selected theatre ==
Production	Year
Revue: Balloon Dubloon	1965
Balloon Dubloon	1970
Short Circuits	1994
Hotspur	1994
Mother and Son	1990s–2014/2015 Various Productions
The Anzac Project: Dear Mum and Dad/Light Begins to Fade	
Liberty Equality Fraternity	
Black Cockatoo	2020
