= Patrick Flynn (composer) =

Multinational musician (1936–2008)

- Born: Charles Stuart; May 18, 1936; Birmingham, England
- Died: September 10, 2008 (aged 72) Los Angeles, California, US
- Occupations: Composer; conductor
- Education: Royal Academy of Music

Patrick Flynn (18 May 1936 — 10 September 2008) was a composer and conductor who was active in the United States, United Kingdom, New Zealand and Australia.

Flynn conducted for many prominent orchestras and festivals worldwide, including the BBC, the Paris Opera, the Spoleto and Varna International Festivals, the Finnish National Opera, Holland Simfonia and the orchestras of New Zealand, Rio de Janeiro, Cologne, Louisville, and San Diego.

== Early life ==
Flynn was born as Charles Stuart in Birmingham, England in 1936, he was an abandoned child, in high school he played the Greig piano concerto. He trained at the Royal Academy of Music.

== Conducting and compositions ==
A pre-eminent conductor for the ballet, Patrick Flynn conducted for Rudolf Nureyev on Broadway and for the American Ballet Theatre, the Royal Ballet, English National Ballet, San Francisco Ballet, Dance Theatre of Harlem, and Netherlands Dance Theatre, among others.

Flynn was a staff conductor for the Australian Opera between 1970 and 1977. He won acclaim as musical director for Hair, Jesus Christ Superstar, and later Joseph And The Amazing Technicolour Dreamcoat.

Flynn composed scores for Australian films such as Caddie, Mad Dog Morgan and Sunday Too Far Away, and the rock operas Ned Kelly, Lasseter and Dorothy Hewett's Joan. In 1965, he composed music for Don't Let It Get You, New Zealand's first full length musical, starring Sir Howard Morrison.

Flynn conducted numerous orchestras in the US and was at the time of his death Music Director of the Riverside County (California) Philharmonic and the Saginaw Bay (Michigan) Symphony Orchestra.

== Audio recordings ==
Flynn's commercial recordings include Tchaikovsky's Swan Lake (published by the Royal New Zealand Ballet), Hair, three versions of Jesus Christ Superstar (two as conductor and the third as music director), and two versions of Ned Kelly, for which he composed the music. He arranged and conducted music for a film promoting North Carolina. His arrangements of Ludwig Minkus' score for Don Quixote (Kitri's Wedding) are heard in a DVD of the American Ballet Theatre's telecast of the ballet for PBS (Kultur). He conducted for Kiri Te Kanawa's film debut in New Zealand (Don't Let It Get You) and for Marjorie Lawrence's last commercial recording "Waltzing Matilda", with the Sydney Symphony Orchestra.

He made split-second cameo appearances in several of the aforementioned films.

There are a considerable number of recorded concert performances, mostly stemming from radio broadcasts, none of which are commercially available.

Flynn's music has also been recorded by others, including by Suzanne Steele ("Lullaby", from Ned Kelly), and Geraldine Turner (the same) in the Australian Broadcasting Corporation soundtrack Once in a Blue Moon: A Celebration of Australian Musicals (from the telecast of the same title).

He was famous for his interpretations of Nutcracker, the absence of any documentation of which is the biggest single loss from his discography/videography.
