= King's Men (TV series) =

King's Men is a 1976 Australian TV series about police. It began as a TV movie that so impressed Channel Nine they commissioned a series. It was created by Ron McLean and ran for 13 episodes.

== Cast ==
=== Main / regular ===
- Gordon Glenwright as Detective Inspector Harry King
- Don Barkham as Snr Detective Hal Whelan
- Don Spencer as Snr Detective Tim Harper
- Tom Oliver as Detective Inspector Frank Weston
- Tina Bursill as Jaybee Giddings
- Don Spencer as Senior Detective Tim Harper

=== Guests ===
- Anne Haddy
- Ben Gabriel as Marshi
- Bill Hunter as Bloke in Pub
- Brian Blain
- Brian Moll as Drake
- Chelsea Brown as Morna
- Cornelia Frances
- Danny Adcock
- Elizabeth Alexander
- Geraldine Turner
- Gerard Kennedy
- James Condon as Petersen
- John Ewart
- Kate Fitzpatrick
- Kevin Miles
- Kris McQuade
- Lex Marinos as Victor Korellis
- Lorna Lesley as The Stripper
- Lynette Curran
- Lynn Rainbow
- Michael Caton as Joey Oslow
- Noeline Brown as Mirabel
- Norman Yemm as Harry Gulson
- Paul Chubb as The Bouncer
- Peta Toppano as Policewoman
- Ralph Cotterill
- Shane Porteous as Constable Ben Price
- Terry Camilleri as Johnny Dollar
- Vince Martin
- Vincent Ball
