= Reg Livermore =

Australian actor

Reg Livermore AO
- Born: Reginald Dawson Livermore; 11 December 1938 (age 87); Parramatta, New South Wales, Australia
- Education: Knox Grammar School Independent Theatre
- Occupations: Actor; singer; theatrical performer; designer; director; lyricist; writer; TV presenter
- Website: Reg Livermore

Reginald Dawson Livermore AO (born 11 December 1938) is an Australian actor, singer, theatrical performer, designer, director, lyricist and writer and former television presenter.

== Biography ==
=== Early life ===
Livermore demonstrated an interest in the performing arts from a young age, taking regular outings to see pantomimes at the Tivoli Theatre, Sydney. At the age of 13, he started hiring local halls to stage his own pantomimes in aid of local charities, with his casts often made up of neighbourhood children and school friends. He hired the Mosman Town Hall in 1955 and again in 1956 to stage Snow White, followed by Mother Goose.

He attended Knox Grammar School and was heavily involved in the school's drama club. He worked nights at the Independent Theatre, where he attended acting classes, and later appeared in stagings of Toad of Toad Hall, The Glass Slipper, The Merchant of Venice and A Midsummer Night's Dream. As a result of this early success, he chose to leave school early. In 1957, after a successful audition, he joined Phillip Street Theatre.

=== Early career ===
Livermore was initially a student of Doris Fitton's at the Independent Theatre in North Sydney. His first professional job was as understudy at the Phillip Theatre in Around The Loop, covering Gordon Chater and Barry Humphries; in the next revue, Cross Section, he starred alongside Ruth Cracknell, June Salter and John Meillon. During this period he met Hayes Gordon and began taking acting lessons, becoming a founding member of the Ensemble Theatre-in-the-round.

There followed a period of instruction and practical experience with Gordon, and Livermore appeared in Ensemble productions of Orpheus Descending, The Drunkard, The Double Dealer, The Canterville Ghost, The Thracian Horses, Miss Lonely Hearts, The Physicists and The Real Inspector Hound. He moved to Melbourne for a two and a half-year stint with the Union Theatre Repertory Company, performing in the works of Rattigan, Ionesco, Shakespeare, Peter Ustinov, Bram Stoker and Patrick White. He also made his directorial debut in a new production of The Shifting Heart by Australian playwright Richard Beynon and wrote his first musical The Good Ship Walter Raleigh. Returning to Sydney, he later performed in the Independent Theatre production Oh Dad, Poor Dad, Mamma's Hung You in the Closet and I'm Feelin' So Sad with Lyndall Barbour, followed up by The Importance of Being Earnest at the Old Tote Theatre Company with Sophie Stewart and Ron Haddrick.

During the 1960s Livermore became more widely known due to roles in a number of notable Australian films and television programs. His first known TV role was in the adventure series Whiplash (1961), later featuring as Ariel in the ABC television production of The Tempest (1963) and co-starring opposite Tony Ward in The Rape of the Belt (1964). During 1964–65 he had a featured role as the alien Vorussa in the ABC-TV children's science-fiction series The Stranger. Livermore had a prominent role in the Commonwealth Film Unit documentary From the Tropics to the Snow (1964) and also featured in the historic ABC-TV production of The Recruiting Officer (1965). He gained his first starring role in TV as the host of the ABC children's comedy series Crackerjack (1966–67), and was a featured cast member for the final season of the satirical sketch series The Mavis Bramston Show (1968).

=== Theatre career ===
During 1964 - 65 Livermore starred as the Wicked Witch of the West in the Wizard of Oz at the Sydney Tivoli, before playing the lead role in The Knack for the Phillip Theatre management. He later performed with the South Australia Theatre Company in Andorra by Max Frisch and West of the Black Stump, which he wrote with Sandra McKenzie. This was followed by the popular, A Cup Of Tea, A Bex and A Good Lie Down, another Sydney Phillip Theatre show featuring Gloria Dawn and Ruth Cracknell. After fifteen months with that show, Livermore was invited to compere the ABC TV children's show CrackerJack. On the strength of his performance, ABC offered Livermore his own Saturday night variety show called I'm Alright Now. The following year he took over from Ronnie Fraser in the Mavis Bramston Show, and later appeared in Channel 7's broadcast of Anything Goes in 1968.

In 1969 Livermore appeared in The Mikado, before joining the cast of the original Australian production of the rock musical Hair. He originally joined as a member of "the Tribe", then became the understudy to Keith Glass who played the role of Berger. When Glass left the production in 1970 Livermore took over as Berger.

After two years starring in Hair he moved on to The Tooth of Crime by Sam Shepard at Nimrod, his own musical Lasseter for the Old Tote, before joining the cast of Jesus Christ Superstar, for which he won rave reviews for his performance as King Herod. In 1974 he starred as Dr Frank'n'Furter in the original Australian production of The Rocky Horror Show.

In 1975, at the request of producer Eric Dare, Livermore conceived his first one-man show, Betty Blokk-buster Follies, which played in Sydney, Canberra, Perth, Adelaide and Melbourne. He then wrote and performed a string of one-man shows, including Wonder Woman, Sacred Cow, Son of Betty and Firing Squad.

In December 1977 Livermore's musical Ned Kelly, written with composer Patrick Flynn, opened in Adelaide and was produced by the Adelaide Festival Centre Trust. Livermore wrote, directed and designed the show but did not perform in it. The production transferred to Sydney, opening in February 1978 and playing for two months. The musical began life as a concept album in 1974.

His 1980 performance in Sacred Cow in London's West End was widely panned by theatre-goers and critics alike, with The Sydney Daily Telegraph subsequently lamenting that his appearance had given Australia a bad name. In 1982 he played the title role in the American musical Barnum, and 1984 saw him in a revival of The Rocky Horror Show, directed by Daniel Abineri.

=== Return to television and theatre ===
In 1989 Livermore returned to television as a member of Burke's Backyard on the Nine Network, concurrently writing and performing Wish You Were Here, a one-man show at the Clarendon Theatre Restaurant in Katoomba. This subsequently played at the Melbourne International Festival and a season at the Victorian Arts Centre. In 1991 he appeared in the Gilbert and Sullivan opera Iolanthe for Victoria State Opera and directed La Traviata for the same organisation at the Ballarat Easter Opera Festival in 1992. In the same year he also wrote and performed his second one-man show for the Blue Mountains, Santa on the Planet of the Apes. This was followed by his performance as Major General Stanley in The Pirates of Penzance, again for Victoria State Opera.

During 1993 he toured Victoria with Wish You Were Here and in 1994 - 95 he performed the same play at the Ensemble Theatre in Sydney. He also wrote and performed Red Riding Hood, the Speed Hump and the Wolf at the Clarendon and the Ensemble Theatre, before receiving an Australian Artist Creative Fellowship through the Australia Council. In 1996 Livermore was appointed Officer of the Order of Australia (AO).

Livermore became a regular presenter on Channel Nine's Our House, an infotainment show. In 1998 Livermore wrote and performed Home Sweet Home, Leonard's Last Hurrah for the Clarendon Guest House, followed by a season at the Melbourne Festival, before moving to the Sydney Opera House in 1999. In 2001 Livermore enjoyed success with The Thank You Dinner – A Feast to Remember and, in 2002, joined Opera Australia for their production of Iolanthe at the Sydney Opera House. Livermore starred as The Lord Chancellor in a sell out, thrice-extended season.

In mid-2003 Livermore won the leading role of Max Bialystock in the new Mel Brooks musical The Producers. In 2006 he played the Duke of Plaza Toro in the Gilbert and Sullivan Opera The Gondoliers for Opera Australia. 2007 brought a return to The Pirates of Penzance at the State Theatre in Melbourne and The Gondoliers at the Sydney Opera House.

In 2008 Livermore took the role of Professor Henry Higgins in Opera Australia's production of My Fair Lady in Melbourne, Sydney, Canberra and Brisbane. Following this appearance and to celebrate the 50th anniversary of the Ensemble Theatre in Sydney, Livermore revived Thank You Dinner, first performed at The Clarendon in Katoomba in 2001.

His autobiography, Chapters and Chances, a photographic history, was published in 2003 through Hardie Grant books.

In 2011, Livermore toured Australia with Nancye Hayes in his self-penned show Turns, for Christine Dunstan Productions.

In February 2014, Livermore was signed for the role of The Wizard in the stage show Wicked, commencing in May 2014 and playing in both Melbourne and Sydney. It was his first stage role for two years. He won a Helpmann Award for the role and, in the same year, received the Sydney Theatre Awards' Lifetime Achievement Award.

In 2016 he starred as Alfred P. Doolittle in the 60th Anniversary production of My Fair Lady, directed by Julie Andrews and opening at the Sydney Opera House. In 2017, he was honored with the Helpmann Awards' JC Williamson Centenary Medal from Live Performance Australia.

=== Personal life ===
Having lived in Wentworth Falls in The Blue Mountains for over 25 years, Livermore relocated to the Southern Highlands in New South Wales with his long time partner Rob McMicking in 2007. In May 2021, Livermore and McMicking married in a small private ceremony at their home in Bowral.

== Filmography ==
Title	Year	Role
Whiplash (TV series)	1960-1961	2 episodes Tad Wooster - Mallomba
Night Stop (TV movie)	1963	Ray
Ballad For One Gun (TV movie))	1963	Mr. Mackie
The Hungry Ones (TV mini-series)	1963	John Ryan
The Tempest (TV movie)	1963	Ariel
The Mavis Bramston Show (TV series)	1964-1968	various
Rape of the Belt (TV movie)	1964	Theseus
From the Tropics to the Snow (short)	1964	
The Recruiting Officer (TV movie) (credited her as Reginald Dawson)	1965	Brazen
The Stranger (TV mini-series) (as Reginald Dawson)	1964-1965	Vanessa
I'm Alright Now (TV series)	1967	Reg
Anything Goes' (TV series)	1968	
The Link Men (TV series)	1970	
Delta (TV series)	1970	Saxon
The Aunty Jack Show (TV series)	1972	Guest Appearance
A Curate in Bohemia (TV movie)	1972	Cripps
Betty Blockk-buster Follies	1976	Betty Blokk
Firing Squad	1984	Various
The Pirates of Penzance (TV movie)	1993	Major. General Stanley

== Discography ==
=== Albums ===
List of albums, with selected details and chart positions
Title	Album details	Peak chart positions
Title	Album details	AUS
Ned Kelly: The Rock Opera (with Patrick Flynn)	Released: 1974; Format: LP; Label: Hamlyn Group (HG001); Soundtrack credited to Reg Livermore	55
Betty Blokk Buster Follies	Released: September 1975; Format: 2xLP; Label: Festival (L-45644); Soundtrack credited to Reg Livermore	15
Wonder Woman	Released: December 1976; Format: 2xLP; Label: Festival (L-45711); Soundtrack credited to Reg Livermore	63
Sacred Cow	Released: 1979; Format: LP; Label: Festival (L-36831); Soundtrack credited to Reg Livermore	62
The Best Of Reg Livermore	Released: 1980; Format: LP, Cassette; Label: Festival (L 37156); Compilation	—
The Entertainer	Released: 1981; Format: LP; Label: Telmak (TMAK 024); Compilation	43
Barnum (with The Australian Cast)	Released: 1982; Format: LP; Label: RCA Victor (VPL1 0366); Soundtrack credited to Reg Livermore	—
Livermore's Firing Squad	Released: 1983; Format: LP, cassette; Label: Telmak (TMAK 051)	—
Livermore's Firing Squad	Released: 1983; Format: LP, cassette; Label: Telmak (TMAK 051); Studio album	—

=== Charting singles ===
List of singles, with selected chart positions
Title	Year	Peak chart positions
Title	Year	AUS
"Celluloid Heroes"	1975	94

== Awards and achievements ==
In a special ceremony at Melbourne's Docklands in 2006, Livermore was named one of 100 Australian Entertainers of the Century.

He received Melbourne's Green Room Award for Male Performer in a Supporting Role in music theatre for The Pirates of Penzance in 1992.

In 2011 an exhibition at Arts Centre Melbourne celebrated Livermore's career, featuring his roles in The Rocky Horror Show, Barnum and The Producers, and his groundbreaking solo shows that began with Betty Blokk-buster Follies. The exhibition displayed stage costumes worn by Livermore and material from his personal archive now held in the Performing Arts Collection.

=== Helpmann Award ===
The Helpmann Awards is an awards show, celebrating live entertainment and performing arts in Australia, presented by industry group Live Performance Australia (LPA) since 2001. In 2019, Livermore received the JC Williamson Award, the LPA's highest honour, for their life's work in live performance.

Year	Nominee / work	Award	Result
2005	Reg Livermore (for The Producers)	Helpmann Award for Best Male Actor in a Musical	Nominated
2009	Reg Livermore (for My Fair Lady)	Helpmann Award for Best Male Actor in a Musical	Nominated
2014	Reg Livermore (for Wicked)	Helpmann Award for Best Male Actor in a Supporting Role in a Musical	Won
2018	Himself	JC Williamson Award	awarded

=== Mo Awards ===
The Australian Entertainment Mo Awards (commonly known informally as the Mo Awards), were annual Australian entertainment industry awards. They recognise achievements in live entertainment in Australia from 1975 to 2016. Reg Livermore won one award in that time.

Year	Nominee / work	Award	Result (wins only)
2004	Reg Livermore	Male Musical Theatre Performer of the Year	Won

=== Sydney Theatre Awards ===
In 2015, Livermore was the recipient of the Lifetime Achievement Award at the Sydney Theatre Awards.

Year	Nominee / work	Award	Result
2015	Himself	Lifetime Achievement Award	awarded

== Publications ==
- Philip Parsons, Victoria Chance (Ed.) (1995). Companion to theatre in Australia. Sydney: Currency Press in association with Cambridge University Press. ISBN 0-86819-357-7.
- Reg Livermore and Rob McMicking (2003). Chapters & chances. South Yarra., Victoria: Hardie Grant Books. ISBN 1-74066-088-9.
- Reg Livermore (2018). Stages: A memoir. South Yarra, Victoria: Hardie Grant Publishing. ISBN 9781743795064.
