= Betty Blokk-buster Follies =

- Directed by: Peter Batey (director)
- Produced by: Eric Dare (executive); Reg Livermore
- Starring: Reg Livermore; The Baxter Funt band The Reginas
- Edited by: E.N. Dewdell
- Release date: 6 July 1976
- Running time: 120 mins
- Country: Australia
- Language: English

Betty Blokk-buster Follies is a 1976 Australian film based on Reg Livermore's popular one man show of the same period.

Characters include:

- Betty Blokk-buster, a German maid who entertained the troops during the war;
- an old man who recalls his youth as a male model
- Vaseline Amyl Nitrate, a football star who joins the Australian ballet.

It was shot in the Bijou Theatre, Balmain, in late 1975.

== Soundtrack ==
=== Track listing ===
LP/Cassette

Side A
No.	Title	Writer(s)	Length
1.	"Tiller Girls"	John Kander, Fred Ebb
2.	"The Family of Man"	Jack Conrad, Paul Williams
3.	"Money, Money"	Kander, Ebb
4.	"Voice of Experience"	Reg Livermore
5.	"Hello in There"	John Prine

Side B
No.	Title	Writer(s)	Length
1.	"Captain Jack"	Billy Joel
2.	"Last Cigarette"	Sidney Charter
3.	"Matrimony"	Gilbert O'Sullivan
4.	"A Little Bit of Love"	Williams

Side C
No.	Title	Writer(s)	Length
1.	"What Makes a Man a Man"	Charles Aznavour
2.	"Long Tall Glasses"	Leo Sayer
3.	"The Entertainer"	Joel
4.	"Festival of Light"	Livermore
5.	"Walk on the Wild Side"	Lou Reed
6.	"Southern Fried"	Harlan Leonard

Side D
No.	Title	Writer(s)	Length
1.	"Train"	David Courtney, Sayer
2.	"Travelling Prayer"	Joel
3.	"Celluloid Heroes"	Ray Davies
4.	"Silverbird"	Sayer
5.	"The Show Must Go On"	Sayer
6.	"You Are Yourself"	Sayer
7.	"S.O.L.O."	Sayer

== Soundtrack chart ==
Chart (1975/76)	Position
Australia (Kent Music Report)	15

== Release history ==
Region	Date	Format	Label	Catalogue
Australia	5 November 2010	2xLP	Festival Records	L-45644
