= Summerfield (film) =

- Directed by: Ken Hannam
- Written by: Cliff Green
- Produced by: Patricia Lovell
- Starring: Nick Tate; Elizabeth Alexander; John Waters; Charles 'Bud' Tingwell, Max Fairchild; Geraldine Turner
- Cinematography: Mike Molloy
- Edited by: Sara Bennett
- Music by: Bruce Smeaton
- Production company: Clare Beach Films
- Distributed by: Greater Union
- Release date: 30 September 1977
- Running time: 91 minutes
- Country: Australia
- Language: English
- Budget: A$560,000

Summerfield is a 1977 Australian film, directed by Ken Hannam, written by Cliff Green and produced by Patricia Lovell. It stars Nick Tate, Elizabeth Alexander, John Waters, Charles 'Bud' Tingwell, Max Fairchild and Geraldine Turner, and was filmed on location on Phillip Island and Churchill Island in Victoria.

== Plot summary ==
The story begins with Simon Robinson arriving in a small seaside community to take over as teacher at the local school. He makes the acquaintance of siblings Jenny and David Abbott (Alexander and Waters, respectively), and Jenny's daughter Sally, who live on the island estate of Summerfield. The discovery that his predecessor vanished without a trace, and that Sally has a rare blood disorder lead Simon to try to uncover the truth behind the mystery.

== Cast ==
- Nick Tate as Simon Robinson
- John Waters as David Abbott
- Elizabeth Alexander as Jenny Abbott
- Charles 'Bud' Tingwell as Dr Miller
- Geraldine Turner as Betty Tate
- Max Cullen as Jim
- Sheila Florance as Miss Gleeson
- Michelle Jarman as Sally Abbott
- Isobel Harley as Miss Tucker
- Joy Westmore as Mrs Shields
- Adrian Wright as Peter Flynn
- Barry Donnelly as Sergeant Potter
- David Smeed as Mark
- Max Fairchild as Joe Baxter

== Production ==
Cliff Green wrote the script for Peter Weir, but he was busy on The Last Wave (1977) so Ken Hannam was hired instead. The budget was raised within three weeks from the Australian Film Commission, Greater Union, the Victorian Film Corporation (who put in $76,500) and private investors. They were essentially the same parties who invested in Break of Day (1976).

Shooting took place at the town of Cowes on Philip Island and around Western Port Bay, Victoria, starting 14 February 1977.

Hannam later said in an interview, "I don't look back on Summerfield as a happy experience at all", but later apologised to Patricia Lovell for statements he made in the interview.
