= Ned Kelly (musical) =

- Concept album cover art
- Music: Patrick Flynn
- Lyrics: Reg Livermore
- Book: Reg Livermore
- Premiere: 30 December 1977: Festival Theatre, Adelaide Festival Centre
- Productions: 1977–78 Adelaide/Sydney; 1982 Queensland; 2026 Ballarat

Ned Kelly (sometimes titled Ned Kelly: The Electric Music Show) is an Australian musical, with script and lyrics by Reg Livermore and music by Patrick Flynn. It tells the story of Australian bushranger Ned Kelly through an eclectic score combining rock opera, vaudeville and burlesque. The original Australian production played in Adelaide and Sydney in 1977 and 1978.

== Development and concept album ==
Livermore began writing Ned Kelly in 1972 when touring as a performer with the musical Hair in Perth and Adelaide. Livermore and Flynn had previously collaborated on the musical Lasseter which was produced in Sydney in 1971 by the Old Tote Theatre Company at the Parade Theatre.

In the manner of Jesus Christ Superstar, a concept album of the musical was made prior to a stage production. The concept album, released in mid-1974, featured various members of the Australian cast of Jesus Christ Superstar, including Jon English as Ned Kelly, Trevor White and John Paul Young as gang members, and Livermore as Sergeant Hare. Janice Slater sang the role of Ma Kelly.

Creation of the album involved some disharmony between Ned Kelly's collaborators, with Bob Ellis brought in by producer Clyde Packer and Flynn to revise existing lyrics and write lyrics for new songs (he is credited on the album as additional lyrics).

Side A

1. "What Else Is New?"
2. "Put 'Em Down"
3. "Lullaby"
4. "Rob a Bank "
5. "Never Going Home"

Side B

1. "Better Watch Yerself"
2. "Dark Walk Home"
3. "Queen Victoria's Fuzz"
4. "If I Was King"
5. "Die Like a Kelly"
6. "Band Together"
7. "Finale"

=== Charts ===
| Chart (1974) | Position |
|---|---|
| Australia (Kent Music Report) | 55 |

=== Critical reception ===
The Sun Herald called it "alternately tragic, high camp, pathetic and funny." The Age called it highly derivative" but also "highly effective and plausible."

== Productions ==
In 1974, it was announced that Robert Helpmann would direct a production in 1975 to feature Livermore, Jon English and Jeannie Lewis, produced by Packer in partnership with J.C. Williamson's. "We're dealing with something that will be as big as Hair," said Clyde Packer. This production did not eventuate and rights lapsed.

=== 1977 Adelaide production ===
In mid-1977, the Adelaide Festival Centre Trust started planning for the first production of Ned Kelly, to open in Adelaide. Livermore was director and designer, with Keith Bain the choreographer and Michael Carlos musical director. "It's not really a rock opera," said Livermore, "but it's got rock opera in it. The music will run a gamut of styles. The whole thing will be a spectacular show. I'm not reducing it to folkky trivia like that Tony Richardson film."

Livermore later said he did "a major overhaul of the then fairly laborious script; discarding almost all of the historically accurate but arguably dull dialogue I wrote new lyrics to cover the discarded material; the show would now be entirely sung and played without an interval. "

The cast included Nick Turbin as Ned Kelly, Geraldine Turner as Ma Kelly, Doug Parkinson as Joe Byrne and Arthur Dignam as Superintendent Hare. Livermore wrote "I passionately believed in the abilities of the men and women we chose as our cast, an overall balance of talent and of type in the context of an ensemble; they all had good voices." However he admitted "I lost objectivity far too early that's for sure" as director.

Ned Kelly opened 30 December 1977 at the Festival Theatre, Adelaide Festival Centre. It was produced by the Adelaide Festival Centre Trust, Eric Dare, the Australian Elizabethan Theatre Trust and SAS Channel 10. The musical was capitalised at $250,000 with weekly running costs of $40,000 to $50,000. The production was visually striking, with design features including a full drop curtain containing over 600 hurricane lamps and Kelly's iconic armour represented by a costume of shiny black plastic with geometric bullet holes. There were 31 numbers. Livermore reflected:

Ned Kelly is a very difficult show to bring off: it has elements of music theatre, rock opera, of real opera, likewise vaudeville and burlesque. It asks an awful lot of its performers, and of its audience in terms of notional adjustments; yet everything has to be seamlessly followed through. As wonderful as it looked, for me there was always a sense of stop and start about the show, the proceedings were hampered by scene changes that took far too long... The music was another cause of disappointment for me, since bringing its components together was not the work of just one person.

Critical reception was negative. The major Adelaide newspaper, the Adelaide Advertiser, in its review referred to the show as "an artistic disaster – a hideous monument to bad taste and theatrical excess". Livermore later reflected the reviews "were so bleak, so awful, I had to question whether the critics and I had actually been at the same event. They certainly had it in for us." He felt critical reception was influenced by the amount of money the show had cost.

"I believe in the show," said Livermore. Audiences were still more than sixty percent capacity. The Age reviewed the Adelaide production saying "there was plenty in the non-stop two-hour show to grab the eye and ear."

The production transferred to Her Majesty's Theatre in Sydney on 4 February 1978, where critical reception was substantially more positive. After two months, the production closed in Sydney. An expected Melbourne season at the Palais Theatre from early April 1978 did not occur.

=== Revival ===
The New Moon Theatre Company toured a revival directed by Terence O'Connell to the Queensland regional cities of Cairns, Townsville, Mackay and Rockhampton in January and February 1982.

A production by Victorian Opera at Her Majesty's Theatre, Ballarat played in March 2026. The cast included Ethan Jones as Ned Kelly, Maria Mercedes as Ma Kelly and Robert Grubb as Superintendent Hare, with Livermore appearing in a cameo role. This was followed by a production staged at University of Melbourne's Union Theatre in July.

== Recordings ==
Original cast member Geraldine Turner performed the ballad "Die Like a Kelly" in a 1994 ABC television special on Australian musicals (Once in a Blue Moon) and this song is featured on its soundtrack.
