= Lasseter (musical) =

- Music: Patrick Flynn; Sandra McKenzie
- Lyrics: Reg Livermore
- Book: Reg Livermore
- Productions: 1971 Sydney

Lasseter is an Australian musical with book and lyrics by Reg Livermore and music by Sandra McKenzie and Patrick Flynn. Described as a musical fable, it follows the spiritual journey of a disillusioned group of young people who leave the city and temptations of consumer society in search of a Utopia in the Australian outback. The title of the musical was inspired by the explorer Harold Bell Lasseter (but the musical is not about him).

Reg Livermore later claimed the musical "didn't hit its mark (nobody's fault but my own I suppose; a script that was simultaneously earnest and ludicrous)."

== Development ==
Livermore, best known at that time as an actor, started working on Lasseter about the same time he joined the cast of the Australian production of Hair. It was the third musical written by Livermore, after West of the Black Stump (1964) and The Good Ship Walter Raleigh (1963).

The musical has an eclectic rock score in the style of Hair. Flynn and McKenzie were also involved in Hair as musical director and stage director respectively. Flynn described Lasseter as ""dramatic, but it has a lot of humor and doesn't take itself too seriously."

== Productions ==
Lasseter opened at the Parade Theatre in Sydney on 8 October 1971, produced by the Old Tote Theatre Company. The season finished on 6 November 1971. It was directed by Jim Sharman with choreography by Keith Bain, musical direction by Flynn and design by Brian Thomson. The production had a cast of 21 and five musicians. As well as Livermore, the cast included Jeannie Lewis, Drew Forsythe, Helen Morse, Garry McDonald and John Waters and a number of other notable Australian performers.

== Reception ==
Margaret Jones in the Sydney Morning Herald described the musical as "more of an all-out sensual attack than a theatrical production". She highlighted potential audience division: "If you think the rejection by youth of the values of a materialistic society is valid, and that peace, love and beauty are realisable ideals rather than impossible dreams, then Lasseter will touch you deeply. If you think the youth cult is ridiculous and drop-outs are only poseurs who will drop back in again as soon as they regain their senses, then you will find the play a load of old rubbish".

Livermore and Flynn would go on to create the musical Ned Kelly together.
