= Mother and Son =

Australian TV series (1984-1994)

- Genre: Sitcom
- Created by: Geoffrey Atherden
- Directed by: Geoff Portmann
- Starring: Ruth Cracknell; Garry McDonald; Henri Szeps; Judy Morris
- Country of origin: Australia
- Original language: English
- No. of seasons: 6
- No. of episodes: 42 (list of episodes)

Production
- Executive producer: John O'Grady
- Producer: Geoff Portmann
- Running time: 22 minutes

Original release
- Network: ABC
- Release: 16 January 1984 – 21 March 1994

Related
- Mother and Son (reboot)

Mother and Son is an Australian television sitcom that was broadcast on the Australian Broadcasting Corporation (ABC) from 16 January 1984 until 21 March 1994. The show stars Ruth Cracknell, Garry McDonald, Henri Szeps and Judy Morris. It featured many Australian actors of the time in guest roles. It was created and written by Geoffrey Atherden. Its theme song features the Tasmanian Symphony Orchestra, playing "I Want a Girl (Just Like the Girl That Married Dear Old Dad)", a jazz standard recorded by Al Jolson in the 1920s.

A stage version of Mother and Son was written by Geoffrey Atherden and premiered at the Comedy Theatre, Melbourne, on 18 July 2014.

In November 2022, it was announced the series would be given an eight-episode reboot with Denise Scott and Matt Okine playing Maggie and Arthur, respectively. Filming for the series began in Sydney in March 2023.

== Premise ==
The plot of the show addresses the problems of ageing and caring for somebody with increasing memory loss, with an often sharp-edged humour which carried with it a tinge of sadness. Despite its unlikely subject matter for a comedy, the show was a favourite with audiences. Maggie's and Arthur's relationship was presented with a fascinating complexity—Maggie's cruel attacks on and emotional manipulation of Arthur disguised her deep dependence on and need of him, and Arthur's dutiful love of Maggie was constantly in conflict with his guilty frustration at the huge limitations for his own life which looking after his mother entailed. The performance of Cracknell, a famous stage actress, as Maggie was particularly lauded as one of the finest characterisations on Australian television. The series itself became extremely popular and has screened in constant re-runs, particularly by Network Ten. Garry McDonald and Ruth Cracknell in character would appear in television adverts for Dynamo laundry liquid.

== Main characters ==
=== Maggie Beare ===
Maggie (Ruth Cracknell), full name Margaret May Lapsley Beare, is the widow of World War II veteran Leo, mother of Robert and Arthur, sister to Lorna and grandmother to Damien and Teonie. Maggie is apparently in the early stages of some form of dementia and her younger son Arthur lives with and takes care of her. However, despite being increasingly forgetful, Maggie is lucid enough to manipulate Arthur when she wants to, usually for something devilish that will seriously inconvenience him. Maggie was a former nurse and met Leo while treating him for war wounds.

=== Arthur Beare ===
Younger son of Maggie and Leo, brother of Robert, uncle to Damien and Teonie and recent ex-husband of Deidre, Arthur (Garry McDonald) is an editor and journalist for The Australian newspaper. When he is not working, he is usually at home attending to the demands of his impish and increasingly confused mother. He drives a 1955 Morris Minor Series II Tourer convertible that is constantly breaking down, has trouble bringing female friends back to the house because of his mother's deliberate interference, and is almost always thwarted by Maggie whenever he attempts to socialize with his work friends. Maggie frequently excoriates Arthur, labelling all his would-be girlfriends as "floozies", Arthur is nicknamed "Artie" by brother Robert.

=== Robert Beare ===
Elder son of Maggie and Leo, brother of Arthur, husband to Liz and father of Damien and Teonie, Robert (Henri Szeps) is a successful dentist who takes many holidays and has extramarital affairs. He does so by disguising his overseas holiday trysts as dental research conferences. His mother tells him off for his womanising and says that it is the reason he failed medical school, much to the disappointment of his late father. He is a 'man of leisure' who is adept at providing excuses as to why it is Arthur and not he that must take the primary care of their elderly mother. Robert loves to play tennis and golf, listening to classical music, and throughout the show owns a series of luxury cars: a Jaguar, Volvo and a BMW. When Arthur asked him for a loan to buy a new car, all Robert would offer him was a seriously impaired Volvo at a discount.

=== Liz Beare ===
Wife of Robert, mother to Damien and Teonie, the long-suffering Liz (Judy Morris) is well aware of her husband's affairs but finds it difficult to prove any of them, because of Robert's well-honed skill at covering them up. So in the meantime, Liz compensates by spending Robert's money and socialising with her equally rich, bored and unhappy friends. She occasionally seeks consolation from Arthur, using behaviour that could suggest that she is attracted to him. She is frequently, however, just as insensitive and selfish as Robert is and just as eager to put Maggie in a home. Liz has a verbal drawl, and is frequently heard to say "Oh Gawd" or "You're weird, Arthur".

== Recurring characters ==
Deidre Beare (Suzanne Roylance): Ex-wife of Arthur. Appears in five episodes. Deidre seems to want the best for her ex-husband Arthur and dislikes him looking after his mother. Maggie resents the fact that Arthur had divorced. They end up getting back together in the final episode.

Aunty Lorna (Melissa Jaffer): Sister of Maggie. Appears in three episodes. She is married to Stan and has three children—Colin, Dawn and Murray. Lorna is the "younger and prettier" sister, much to Maggie's chagrin. Stan, Colin, Dawn and Murray do not appear in the show, and are only mentioned by name. In the second episode in which she appears it is revealed that Stan has died.

Dr. Holloway (Martin Vaughan): (3 episodes) the family's doctor, who exhibits signs of Alzheimer's disease.

== Cast ==
=== Main ===
- Ruth Cracknell as Maggie Beare
- Garry McDonald as Arthur Beare
- Henri Szeps as Robert Beare
- Judy Morris as Liz Beare

=== Recurring ===
- Suzanne Roylance as Deidre Beare (5 episodes)
- Melissa Jaffer as Aunty Lorna (3 episodes)
- Martin Vaughan as Dr. Holloway (3 episodes)
- Roslyn Gentle as Wendy (2 episodes)
- Warwick Moss as Fireman (2 episodes)
- Ron Haddrick as Claude Price (2 episodes)
- Constance Lansberg as Helen (2 episodes)
- Suzette Williams as Constable (2 episodes)

=== Guests ===
- Arky Michael as Constable (1 episode)
- Barbara Stephens as Susan Price (1 episode)
- Betty Lucas as Mavis (1 episode)
- Bud Tingwell as The Judge (1 episode)
- Colleen Clifford as Old Lady (1 episode)
- Diane Craig as Delores (1 episode)
- Frank Lloyd as Catholic Priest
- George Whaley as Doctor (1 episode)
- Jennifer Cluff as Carrie Samuels (1 episode)
- Joan Sydney as Merle MacDonald (1 episode)
- Julie Nihill as Receptionist (1 episode)
- Les Foxcroft as Old Man (1 episode)
- Lois Ramsey as Butcher #1 (1 episode)
- Penne Hackforth-Jones as Community Medical Officer Joan (1 episode)
- Peter Gwynne as Uncle Tom
- Peter Whitford as Minister (1 episode)
- Ray Meagher as Geoff (1 episode)
- Sonia Todd as Policewoman (1 episode)
- Tina Bursill as Carmen (1 episode)
- Tom Oliver as Sergeant (1 episode)
- Vivienne Garrett as Tessa (1 episode)

== The house ==
The house used for outside shots with the cast, at 16 Rickard Street, Rodd Point, built by John Cockerill in 1927, had an auction which was "off the Richter scale with well and truly over 100 people, at least".

The house was mainly unknown in connection to the show (with most bidders being too young to know the sitcom) and sold in 2014 for $1.95 million to build a dual-occupancy dwelling with an underground garage and swimming pool.

No objections were received, the application was amended and demolition and construction was approved in June 2015.

== DVD releases ==
All six series have been released in Australia.

- Vol. 1 (2-disc set), released 10 June 2004
- Vol. 2 (2-disc set), released 3 February 2005
- Vol. 3 (2-disc set), released 7 July 2005
- Vol. 4 (2-disc set), released 6 October 2005
- Vol. 5 (1-disc set), released 7 November 2007
- 'The Complete Series 1–6' (6-disc box set), released 7 November 2007
- Series 1, released 1 April 2010
- Series 2, released 1 April 2010
- Series 3, released 1 April 2010
- Series 4, released 1 April 2010
- Series 5, released 1 April 2010
- Series 6, released 1 April 2010

== Digital release ==
In 2016, the show in its entirety was available on Netflix in Australia. As of 2018, it is on Stan.

== Awards and nominations ==
=== Gold Logies ===
- 1994: Most Popular Comedy Personality, Ruth Cracknell

=== Silver Logies ===
- 1993, 1994: Most Outstanding Actress, Ruth Cracknell
- 1994: Most Outstanding Actor, Garry McDonald

=== Other awards ===
- 1987: Winner of the Television Drama Award presented by the Australian Human Rights Commission

== Stage productions ==
The stage version of Mother and Son, written by Geoffrey Atherden and starring Noeline Brown, Darren Gilshenan and Shane Jacobson, premiered at the Comedy Theatre, Melbourne on 18 July 2014.

Jally Entertainment was scheduled to tour the stage production, starring Julie McGregor and Christopher Truswell, in June and July 2020 to Caloundra, Wangaratta, Bainsdale, Wonthagi, Sale, Drysdale, Maryborough, Rockhampton, Mackay, Brisbane, Redland, Cessnock, Taree, Newcastle and Queanbeyan.

== Remake ==
A Swedish remake was made in 1998. One season of 12 episodes were produced, starring Inga Landgre as Inger Velander and Pontus Gustafsson as Roland Velander. The show was called Glöm inte mamma! ("Don't forget mom!").
