= One Day Miller =

1981 Australian television series

- Written by: Geoffrey Atherden
- Directed by: Bruce Best; David Goldie; Michael Jenkins
- Starring: Tony Llewellyn-Jones; Penne Hackforth-Jones
- Country of origin: Australia
- Original language: English
- No. of seasons: 1
- No. of episodes: 7

Production
- Producer: Bruce Best
- Running time: 25 minutes

Original release
- Network: ABC
- Release: August 3 – September 14, 1979

One Day Miller is an Australian television series that aired on ABC from 1979. It was a spinoff the One Day Miller episode of Tickled Pink which featured Tony Llewellyn-Jones and Penne Hackforth-Jones as a married couple. The series of 7 episodes began on 3 August airing on Fridays at 9:20pm.

== Cast ==
- Tony Llewellyn-Jones as Miller Williams
- Penne Hackforth-Jones as Marilyn Miller

== Reception ==
Don Groves from the Sun-Herald wrote "Too many writers, producers and actors have foundered in the elusive quest for a sit-com that works, and I'm afraid that the One Day Miller crew may join them." The Ages Mark Lawrence wrote "Barely one scene in the 25-minute programme threatens to raise more than a smirk, let alone a belly laugh." The Sydney Morning Herald's Garry Shelley says "Tony Llewellyn-Jones is a fine performer and the director, Bruce Best has induced expressions and mannerisms to the best advantage. Tony has a perfect foil in Penne who, despite a lack of humorous lines, manages to portray a picture of sheer misery with relative ease."
