= Geraldine Turner =

Australian actress and singer

Geraldine Turner OAM
- Born: 23 June 1950 (age 75); Brisbane, Queensland, Australia
- Occupations: Actor, voice actor
- Years active: 1970–present

Geraldine Gail Turner OAM (born 23 June 1950 in Brisbane, Australia) is an Australian actress and singer. She has been a leading performer in Australian musical theatre since the 1970s, and has also been active in plays, recordings, film and television.

== Early life ==
Turner was born and raised in Brisbane, attending St Margaret's Anglican Girls' School. Her career in performance began at an early age. As a child, Turner appeared in productions of Aladdin and The Sleeping Princess and as a performer on the local television variety program Cottee's Happy Hour. She trained in classical ballet for ten years and was a member of the Ballet Theatre of Queensland. She received a Diploma of Education after high school. She also studied classical singing at the Queensland Conservatorium of Music for 5 years. She began her career with the Queensland Theatre Company in the early 1970s.

== Theatre ==
In the early 1970s, Turner appeared with the Queensland Theatre Company in the musicals Lock Up Your Daughters, A Rum Do!, Oh, What a Lovely War! and the play She Stoops to Conquer.

She played Petra in the 1973 original Australian cast of A Little Night Music (J. C. Williamson's) and the lead role of Desiree Armfeldt in a 1990 Sydney Theatre Company revival. Other roles in Stephen Sondheim musicals include Mrs Lovett in Sweeney Todd (Melbourne Theatre Company), The Baker's Wife in Into the Woods and Joanne in Company (Sydney Theatre Company).

Other notable musical theatre roles include Nancy in Oliver!, Velma Kelly in the original Australian cast of Chicago (Sydney Theatre Company), Reno Sweeney in Anything Goes and Katisha in The Mikado (Essgee). She has performed in Australian musicals Summer Rain (Queensland Theatre Company), Jonah Jones (Sydney Theatre Company) and Ned Kelly (Adelaide Festival Centre Trust / Australian Elizabethan Theatre Trust). Turner has also featured in various plays including Inheritance (Melbourne Theatre Company), Present Laughter and Don's Party (Sydney Theatre Company). In cabaret, she has performed in Australia, the United States, the United Kingdom, Canada and Africa.

== Recordings ==
Turner features in Australian cast recordings of Chicago and Anything Goes. She has several solo albums including two compilations of Sondheim songs, Old Friends (also released as The Stephen Sondheim Songbook) and Geraldine Turner Sings the Stephen Sondheim Songbook Volume 2.

== Film and television ==
Her films roles include Vere in Careful, He Might Hear You (which won the AFI Award for Best Film in 1983), The Wog Boy and Summerfield. Turner has played a recurring role in the Australian television drama House Husbands.

== Filmography ==
=== Film ===
| Year | Title | Role | Type |
|---|---|---|---|
| 1975 | The Box | Lindy Jones | Feature film |
| 1976 | Break of Day | Sandy | Feature film |
| 1977 | Summerfield | Betty Tate | Feature film |
| 1978 | The Clown and the Mind Reader | Mind Reader | Film short |
| 1983 | Careful, He Might Hear You | Vere | Feature film |
| 2000 | The Wog Boy | Raelene Beagle-Thorpe | Feature film |
| 2015 | Tempting Fate | Extra | Feature film, US |

=== Television ===
| Year | Title | Role | Type |
|---|---|---|---|
| 1975 | The Box | Regular role: Lindy Jones | TV series |
| 1975 | Homicide | Guest role: Lisa Andrews | TV series, 1 episode |
| 1976 | King's Men | Guest role | TV series, 1 episode |
| 1976 | The Sentimental Bloke | Doreen | TV movie |
| 1979 | One Day Miller | Regular role: Loretta | TV series, 7 episodes |
| 1979–1980 | The Restless Years | Recurring role: Sandy Miller | TV series, 21 episodes |
| 1983 | A Country Practice | Guest role: Mandy Marshall | TV series, 2 episodes |
| 1985 | Natural Causes | Lead role: Danni | TV movie |
| 1992 | Six Pack | Lead role: Lydia | TV film series, episode 6: "That Man's Father" |
| 1993 | G.P. | Guest role: Kath | TV series, 1 episode |
| 2006 | All Saints | Guest role: 'Shrieking' Sharona McDonald | TV series, 1 episode |
| 2006 | Home and Away | Recurring role: Kitty Landsdowne / Kitty Vale | TV series, 13 episodes |
| 2013–2014 | House Husbands | Recurring guest role: Wendy Horne | TV series, 3 episodes |

=== Television (as self) ===
| Year | Title | Role | Type |
|---|---|---|---|
| 1959 | Cottee's Happy Hour | Dancer | TV series |
| 1973 | Jill | Herself | TV special |
| 1976 | Quest | Herself | TV series, 1 episode |
| 1978 | Cappriccio | Guest | TV series, 1 episode |
| 1978; 1980; 1981; 1983; 1984; 1985 | The Mike Walsh Show | Guest / guest singer | TV series, 6 episodes |
| 1981–1983 | Parkinson in Australia | Guest | TV series, 3 episodes |
| 1986 | The Two Ronnies in Australia | Guest singer (singing "I'm Just a Housewife") | TV series, 1 episode |
| 1987 | Have a Go | Guest judge | TV series, 3 episodes |
| 1988–1993 | The Midday Show | Guest singer | TV series |
| 1989 | The Bert Newton Show | Guest singer | TV series, 2 episodes |
| 1989 | In Melbourne Today | Guest | TV series, 1 episode |
| 1991 | In Sydney Today | Guest | TV series, 1 episode |
| 1994; 1995 | At Home | Guest | TV series, 2 episodes |
| 1995–2005 | Good Morning Australia | Guest singer | TV series |
| 1995 | Ernie and Denise | Guest | TV series, 1 episode |
| 1996 | Roy and HG | Guest | TV series, 1 episode |
| 1997 | Monday to Friday | Guest | TV series, 1 episode |
| 1998; 2000 | Denise | Guest | TV series, 1 episodes |
| 1999 | Beauty and the Beast | Guest | TV series, 2 episodes |
| 1999 | Laws | Guest | TV series, 1 episode |
| 2000; 2012 | The Morning Show | Guest | TV series, 1 episode |
| 2000 | 2000 Australian Film Institute Awards | Winner | TV special |
| 2004 | Mornings | Guest | TV series, 1 episode |
| 2005 | Spicks and Specks | Guest | TV series, 1 episode |
| 2006 | Studio A with Simon Burke | Guest | TV series, 1 episode |
| 2007 | Susie | Guest | TV series, 1 episode |
| 2008 | 9am with David & Kim | Guest | TV series, 1 episode |
| 2012 | The Circle | Guest | TV series, 1 episode |
| 2015 | The Daily Edition | Guest | TV series, 1 episode |
| 2022 | Today Extra | Guest | TV series, 1 episode |
| 2022 | Studio 10 | Guest | TV series, 1 episode |
| 2024 | News Breakfast | Guest (with Gerry Connolly) | TV series, 1 episode |

== Theatre ==
| Year | Title | Role | Type |
|---|---|---|---|
| 1970 | A Rum Do! | Sadie | SGIO Theatre, Brisbane with QTC |
| 1971 | Oh, What a Lovely War! | | SGIO Theatre, Brisbane with QTC |
| 1971 | She Stoops to Conquer | | SGIO Theatre, Brisbane with QTC |
| 1971 | The Wind in the Sassafras Trees | | SGIO Theatre, Brisbane with QTC |
| 1971 | The Legend of King O'Malley | | Australian tour |
| 1972 | Lock Up Your Daughters | | SGIO Theatre, Brisbane with QTC |
| 1972–73 | No, No, Nanette | Betty Brown | Her Majesty's Theatre, Melbourne, Regent Theatre, Sydney |
| 1973–74 | A Little Night Music | Petra | Her Majesty's Theatre, Sydney, Her Majesty's Theatre, Adelaide, Her Majesty's Theatre, Melbourne with J. C. Williamson’s |
| 1976 | Cole | | Marian Street Theatre, Sydney |
| 1976 | A Toast to Melba | Nellie Melba | SGIO Theatre, Brisbane |
| 1977 | Ashes | Anne Harding | Nimrod Theatre Company, Sydney |
| 1977 | Ned Kelly | Ma Kelly | Festival Theatre, Adelaide, Her Majesty's Theatre, Sydney with Australian Elizabethan Theatre Trust |
| 1978 | Pandora's Cross | Primavera | Paris Theatre, Sydney |
| 1980 | The Sunny South | Clarice Chester | Sydney Opera House |
| 1980 | I'm Getting My Act Together and Taking It on the Road | Alice | Space Theatre, Adelaide, Sydney Opera House |
| 1980 | Geraldine Turner Sings | Singer / solo show | Nimrod Street Theatre, Sydney, SGIO Theatre, Brisbane for Warana Festival |
| 1980 | The Elephant Man | Pinhead / Mrs Kendall | Russell Street Theatre, Melbourne for MTC |
| 1981 | An Evening | Musical Arranger | Sydney Opera House, Her Majesty's Theatre, Brisbane, Canberra Theatre, Festival Theatre, Adelaide, Princess Theatre, Melbourne |
| 1981; 1983 | Chicago | Velma Kelly | Sydney Opera House, Theatre Royal, Sydney with STC, Comedy Theatre, Melbourne, Festival Theatre, Adelaide, Lee Theatre, Hong Kong |
| 1982 | Moving Target | | Upstage Theatre Restaurant, Sydney |
| 1983 | Boldest and Best Programme 2 | Dancer | Sydney Opera House |
| 1983 | Present Laughter | | Theatre Royal, Sydney with STC |
| 1984 | Oliver! | Nancy | Festival Theatre, Adelaide |
| 1985 | Jonah Jones | | Wharf Theatre with STC with STC & Playhouse, Adelaide with STCSA |
| 1986 | Company | Joanne | Sydney Opera House with STC |
| 1986–87 | H.M.S. Pinafore | Mrs Cripps | Sydney, Brisbane, Adelaide, State Theatre, Melbourne, Canberra Theatre, Her Majesty’s Theatre, Ballarat |
| 1987 | Sweeney Todd | Mrs Lovett | Playhouse, Melbourne, Her Majesty's Theatre, Sydney, Riverstage, Brisbane with MTC |
| 1987 | La Belle Helene | Helene | State Theatre, Melbourne |
| 1988 | Noel and Gertie | | Wharf Theatre, Sydney |
| 1988 | A Stephen Sondheim Evening | | Theatre Royal, Sydney |
| 1989 | Don's Party | | Sydney Opera House with STC |
| 1989 | Anything Goes | Reno Sweeney | State Theatre, Sydney |
| 1990 | A Little Night Music | Desiree Armfeldt | Sydney Opera House with STC |
| 1992 | Geraldine Turner | Singer / solo show | Cremorne Orpheum, Queanbeyan School of Arts Cafe |
| 1993 | Into the Woods | The Baker's Wife | Sydney Opera House |
| 1993 | The Electrifying Miss Geraldine Turner | Singer / solo show | Queanbeyan School of Arts Cafe |
| 1993 | A Rare Jewel | | Newcastle Civic Theatre |
| 1993 | A Brand New Show | Singer / solo show | Marian Street Theatre, Sydney |
| 1994 | Kismet in Concert | Lalume | Victorian Arts Centre |
| 1995 | This Moment | Singer / solo show | Tilbury Hotel, Sydney |
| 1995–96 | The Sweetest Sounds | Singer / solo show | Cremorne Theatre, Brisbane, Tilbury Hotel, Sydney |
| 1995 | The Mikado | Katisha | Lyric Theatre, Brisbane, State Theatre, Sydney, Her Majesty's Theatre, Melbourne, Her Majesty's Theatre, Adelaide, Canberra Theatre with Essgee |
| 1996 | Tilbury Hotel 10th Anniversary Gala | | Tilbury Hotel, Sydney |
| 1996 | Gala Re-Opening of the Regent Theatre | | Regent Theatre, Melbourne |
| 1996 | Summer of the Seventeenth Doll | | Theatre Royal, Hobart, Playhouse, Adelaide, Glen Street Theatre, Newcastle Civic Theatre with STCSA & MTC |
| 1997 | Summer Rain | Ruby | Suncorp Theatre, Brisbane with QTC |
| 1997 | Cabaret | Fraulein Schneider | University of Sydney |
| 1998 | Grease - The Arena Spectacular | Miss Lynch | Australian tour |
| 1998 | Geraldine Turner | Singer / solo show | Capers Cabaret, Melbourne |
| 2000 | Simply Weill | Singer | Sydney Opera House |
| 2000 | Call Me Madam | Sally Adams | State Theatre, Melbourne |
| 2000 | It Was Worth It | Singer / solo show | Capers Cabaret, Melbourne, Cafe 9, Sydney |
| 2001 | The Forest | Raisa Pavlovna | Playhouse, Brisbane with QTC |
| 2002 | 2nd Helpmann Awards 2002 | | The Star, Sydney |
| 2002 | The Witches of Eastwick | Felicia Gabriel | Princess Theatre, Melbourne |
| 2003 | Inheritance | Maureen Delaney | Playhouse, Melbourne with MTC, Sydney Opera House with STC |
| 2003 | These People | | Wharf Theatre, Sydney with STC |
| 2004 | A Little Night Music | Fredrika Armfeldt | James Hay Theatre, Christchurch, Bruce Mason Centre, Auckland |
| 2004 | Australia's Leading Ladies | Singer | Concert Hall, Brisbane |
| 2005 | Rosie | Rose Shaw | Independent Theatre, Sydney |
| 2005 | Somewhere | | Q Theatre, Penrith |
| 2006 | Mavis Bramston Reloaded | | Brisbane City Hall, Twin Towns, Gold Coast |
| 2007 | An Audience with Stephen Sondheim | Singer | Theatre Royal, Sydney |
| 2007 | Up Close and Musical | Singer | Theatre Royal, Sydney |
| 2007 | Ever After Ever | Singer | Theatre Royal, Sydney |
| 2009 | Steel Magnolias | | Seymour Centre, Sydney, QUT, Her Majesty's Theatre, Adelaide |
| 2009 | Jacques Brel is Alive and Well and Living in Paris | | The Street Theatre, Acton |
| 2011 | Wicked | | Lyric Theatre, Brisbane, Festival Theatre, Adelaide |
| 2011 | Side by Side by Sondheim | | Geelong Arts Centre |
| 2011 | MP | Ava Turner | The Street Theatre, Acton |
| 2014 | Ruthless! The Musical | Lita Encore | Seymour Centre, Sydney |
| 2014 | White Rabbit, Red Rabbit | | The Street Theatre, Acton |
| 2015 | Turner's Turn | Solo show | Hayes Theatre Co, Brisbane Powerhouse, Alex Theatre, St Kilda, Acton Street Theatre |
| 2015 | The Chain Bridge | Eva | Actom Street Theatre |
| 2016–17 | Jacques Brel is Alive and Well and Living in Paris | Director | Sutherland Memorial School of Arts, Riverside Theatres Parramatta |
| 2017; 2019 | Two Weddings, One Bride | Aurore | Sydney Opera House, Playhouse, Melbourne, Riverside Theatres Parramatta |
| 2018 | Cosi Fan Tutte | Stage Director | Opera Pavilion, Olinda |
| 2018 | A Tale of Two Divas | Stage Director | Burrinja, Upwey, Healesville Memorial Hall |
| 2020 | Table for Six, Please! | | Online - Australia: |
| 2022 | Moments in the Woods: Songs & Stories of Sondheim | | The Famous Spiegeltent at the Adelaide Cabaret Festival |
| 2022–23 | The Mousetrap | Mrs Boyle | Theatre Royal, Sydney, Comedy Theatre, Melbourne, Canberra Theatre |

== Personal life ==
She was married briefly at age 21.

Her second husband is conductor Brian Castles-Onion.

She was the federal President of Actors Equity (MEAA) in Australia. She stood in the 2008 local government election for the Wingecarribee Shire Council in the Southern Highlands of New South Wales, and has advocated for the role of the arts in the community.

Turner published an autobiography in 2022, Turner's Turn.

== Awards and nominations ==
| Year | Nominated work | Award | Category | Result |
|---|---|---|---|---|
| 1994 | Oliver! | Green Room Awards | Best Female Actor in a Leading Role (Music Theatre) | Won |
| 1988 | Geraldine Turner | Mo Awards | Female Musical Theatre Performer of the Year | Won |
| 1988 | Geraldine Turner | Order of Australia | Medal for Services to the Performing Arts | Honoured |
| 1989 | Anything Goes | Green Room Award | Best Female Actor in a Leading Role (Music Theatre) | Won |
