= Old Tote Theatre Company =

Australian theatre company

The Old Tote Theatre Company (1963–1978) was a New South Wales theatre company that began as the standing acting and theatre company of Australia's National Institute of Dramatic Art (NIDA). It was the predecessor to the Sydney Theatre Company. The Old Tote was one of the leading Australian theatre companies.

== History ==
The Old Tote Theatre was established in 1962 by the National Institute of Dramatic Art (NIDA), which had been created in 1958. It began in a converted tin shed on the campus of University of New South Wales in Sydney. The wood and corrugated iron building (originally an army recreation hall) became known as the "Old Tote" because it had previously been part of the group of buildings that had formerly housed the totalisator betting machine when the site had been Kensington Racecourse. The building still stands, and is now known as the Figtree Theatre.

The company was founded by the University's Professor of Drama, Robert Quentin, and NIDA Director, Tom Brown. The University contributed £6,000 to convert the building into a theatre and its debut production, which opened on 2 February 1963, was a highly successful production of Anton Chekhov's The Cherry Orchard, starring Sophie Stewart and her husband Ellis Irving, with Gordon Chater as Yepikhodov, John Bell as Trofimov and Ron Haddrick as Gayev, which ran for almost two months. This was followed by a double bill of The Bald Prima Donna and The Fire Raisers, with a cast that including Brian James, Gwen Plumb, Neil Fitzpatrick, Anna Volska and Jack Allan. Other productions in the first season included Hamlet, with John Bell in the title role, and Playboy of the Western World. The first season was an outstanding success and was extended to 28 weeks, with an average nightly attendance of 95%.

In 1967 it was proposed to replace the old building with a new complex housing NIDA, the School of Drama and a larger theatre, but this plan was never carried out. In the same year, the Old Tote was separated from NIDA, moving its headquarters to the old Parade Theatre, in a building still on the UNSW campus. The company's inaugural performance in that venue was on 7 May 1969 with Robin Lovejoy's production of Tom Stoppard's Rosencrantz and Guildenstern Are Dead. The move came with a subsidy from the newly created Australian Council for the Arts, and the Old Tote then embarked on a policy of expansion and at the request of the state government it took on the responsibilities of a state theatre company. This led to commitments to stage productions at both the Sydney Opera House and the Seymour Centre as well as at the Parade.

The Old Tote company went on to occupy the Drama Theatre of the Sydney Opera House from 1973 to 1978 and also toured some of the shows around Australia, including Rosencrantz and Guildenstern are Dead to the Canberra Theatre Centre. However these additional activities, compounded by lack of support from the New South Wales state government, overstretched the company's resources and in 1978 the Old Tote went into liquidation.

== Productions ==
Year	Title	Actors	Venue/s
1963	The Cherry Orchard	Sophie Stewart, Ellis Irving, Gordon Chater, John Bell, Ron Haddrick, Philippa Baker, Janice Dinnen, Anna Volska, Owen Weingott, Peter Whitford	UNSW Old Tote Theatre
1963	The Bald Prima Donna	Brian James, Gwen Plumb, Anna Volska	UNSW Old Tote Theatre
1963	The Fire Raisers	Brian James, Gwen Plumb, Anna Volska, John Bell, Peter Rowley, Peter Whitford	UNSW Old Tote Theatre
1963	Hamlet	John Bell, John Bell, Janice Dinnen, John Gregg, Ron Haddrick, Jennifer Hagan, Ellis Irving, Robert McDarra, Peter Rowley, Sophie Stewart, Lou Vernon, Peter Whitford	UNSW Old Tote Theatre
1963	Lunch Hour	Ron Haddrick	Palace Theatre
1963	Playboy of the Western World	Wendy Blacklock, Jeanie Drynan, Carmen Duncan, Jennifer Hagan, Tessa Mallos, Owen Weingott, Peter Whitford	UNSW Old Tote Theatre
1964	The Caucasian Chalk Circle	Helmut Bakaitis, John Bell, Tommy Dysart, Ron Haddrick, Kerry McGuire, Frank Taylor, Leonard Teale, Anna Volska, Doreen Warburton	UNSW Old Tote Theatre
1964	Heartbreak House	Edward Hepple, Diana Perryman, Muriel Steinbeck, Frank Taylor, Owen Weingott	UNSW Old Tote Theatre
1964	Day of Glory	Janice Dinnen, Frank Taylor, Stuart Wagstaff	UNSW Old Tote Theatre
1964	Who’s Afraid of Virginia Woolf?	Wendy Blacklock, Kevin Miles	UNSW Old Tote Theatre, Palace Theatre, Sydney, Theatre 62, Adelaide, Albert Hall, Canberra
1964	The Zoo Story	Richard Meikle	Palace Theatre, Sydney
1964	The American Dream	Neva Carr Glyn, Ethel Lang, Gwen Plumb	Palace Theatre, Sydney
1964	Sweet Day of Decision	Tommy Dysart, Ben Gabriel, Ron Haddrick, Margo Lee, Judy Nunn, Edmund Pegge, Frank Taylor	UNSW Old Tote Theatre
1964	The Importance of Being Earnest	Kate Fitzpatrick, Neva Carr Glyn, Janice Dinnen, Ron Haddrick, Ellis Irving, Reg Livermore, Sophie Stewart	UNSW Old Tote Theatre
1964	Still Life	Kerry McGuire	UNSW Old Tote Theatre
1964	The Sport of My Mad Mother	John Hopkins, Kerry McGuire	UNSW Old Tote Theatre
1965	The Representative	Alastair Duncan, Ron Haddrick, Brian James, Frank Lloyd, Robert McDarra, Mark McManus, Judy Nunn, Peter Whitford	UNSW Old Tote Theatre
1965	Othello	Helmut Bakaitis, Patricia Conolly, Tommy Dysart, Ron Haddrick, Frank Lloyd, Robert McDarra, Helen Morse, Doreen Warburton	UNSW Old Tote Theatre
1964	Inadmissible Evidence	Judi Farr, Anne Haddy, Brian James, Peter O'Shaughnessy, Moya O'Sullivan	UNSW Old Tote Theatre
1965	The Country Wife	Roger Climpson, Patricia Conolly, Ron Haddrick, Anne Haddy, Frank Lloyd, Robert McDarra, Mark McManus, Dinah Shearing, Nancye Stewart, Doreen Warburton	UNSW Old Tote Theatre
1965	Entertaining Mr Sloane	John Ewart, Gwen Plumb	UNSW Old Tote Theatre
1965	Who's Afraid of Virginia Woolf?	Wendy Blacklock, Alister Smart	UNSW Old Tote Theatre, Hunter Theatre, Canberra Theatre, Lilac Time Hall, Albury Civic Theatre, Wagga Wagga Civic Theatre, Amoco Centre, Orange, Wollongong Town Hall, Coffs Harbour Civic Hall, Lismore Town Hall
1966	Tiny Alice	Alan Edwards, Ben Gabriel, Rob Inglis, Dinah Shearing	UNSW Old Tote Theatre
1966	A Moon for the Misbegotten	Stewart Ginn, Ron Haddrick	UNSW Old Tote Theatre, Canberra Theatre, Russell Street Theatre, Playhouse, Perth
1966	The Killing of Sister George		UNSW Old Tote Theatre
1966	Altona	Peter Collingwood, Edgar Metcalfe, Peter Rowley	UNSW Old Tote Theatre
1966	Aspects of Love	James Condon, Kevin Miles	UNSW Old Tote Theatre
1966	Night of the Ding-Dong	Allen Bickford, Ron Graham, Jennifer Hagan, Dennis Olsen	UNSW Old Tote Theatre
1966	Three Sisters	Philippa Baker, James Condon, Barbara Frawley, Alister Smart, Stanley Walsh	UNSW Old Tote Theatre
1967	The Schoolmistress	Jacki Weaver, Jeanie Drynan, Alan Edwards, Clarissa Kaye, Frank Lloyd, Deidre Rubenstein, Jonathan Sweet, Owen Weingott	UNSW Old Tote Theatre
1967	The Homecoming	Alice Fraser, Gordon Glenwright, Tom Oliver, Frank Taylor	UNSW Old Tote Theatre, Canberra Theatre
1967	The Imaginary Invalid	Jacki Weaver, Ron Haddrick, Jennifer Hagan, Edwin Hodgeman, Helen Morse, Peter Whitford	UNSW Old Tote Theatre
1967	The School for Scandal	Peter Collingwood, Jeanie Drynan, Ron Graham, Ron Haddrick, Jennifer Hagan, Edwin Hodgeman, Helen Morse, Doreen Warburton, Peter Whitford	UNSW Old Tote Theatre
1967	Hedda Gabler	Pat Bishop, Jeanie Drynan, Jennifer Hagan, Edwin Hodgeman	UNSW Old Tote Theatre
1968	Who’s Afraid of Virginia Woolf?	Kevin Miles	UNSW Old Tote Theatre, Palace Theatre, Sydney, Albert Hall, Canberra,
1968	You Never Can Tell	Jacki Weaver, Michael Boddy, Kirsty Child, Rona Coleman, Alan Edwards, Ron Haddrick, Doreen Warburton	UNSW Old Tote Theatre
1968	King Lear	Kirsty Child, Ron Graham, Garry McDonald, Owen Weingott	UNSW Old Tote Theatre
1968	Childermas	Peter Collingwood, Alan Edwards, Ron Graham, Ron Haddrick, Harold Hopkins	Her Majesty's Theatre, Brisbane
1968	A Refined Look at Existence	Michael Boddy, Peter Collingwood, Ron Graham, Ron Haddrick, Jennifer Hagan, Harold Hopkins, Frank Lloyd, Betty Lucas	UNSW Old Tote Theatre
1968	This Old Man Comes Rolling Home	Pat Bishop, Kirsty Child, Peter Collingwood, John Derum, Ron Graham, Ron Haddrick, Jennifer Hagan, Betty Lucas, Trisha Noble, Carole Skinner	UNSW Old Tote Theatre
1968	The Fire on the Snow	Peter Collingwood, Alan Edwards, Ron Haddrick, Dennis Miller	UNSW Old Tote Theatre
1968	Norm and Ahmed	Ron Graham, Edwin Hodgeman	UNSW Old Tote Theatre
1968	At Least You Get Something Out of That	Peter Collingwood, Ron Graham, Ron Haddrick, Frank Lloyd	UNSW Old Tote Theatre
1969	The Rivals	Judi Farr, Ron Haddrick	UNSW Old Tote Theatre, SGIO Theatre, Playhouse, Canberra
1969	Pygmalion	Helen Morse	UNSW Parade Theatre & Canberra Theatre
1969	Hamlet	Rona Coleman, Gordon Glenwright, Ron Haddrick, Nico Lathouris	UNSW Old Tote Theatre, SGIO Theatre, Brisbane, Playhouse, Canberra, Theatre Royal, Hobart
1969	The Merchant of Venice	Helen Morse	UNSW Parade Theatre
1969	The Rise and Fall of Boronia Avenue	Pat Bishop, Sandy Gore, Jeff Kevin, Deidre Rubenstein, Peter Whitford	Jane Street Theatre
1969	Little Murders	Ron Haddrick, Kate Fitzpatrick	UNSW Parade Theatre, SGIO Theatre, Brisbane, Playhouse, Canberra
1969	Rooted	Pat Bishop, Sandy Gore, Jeff Kevin, Garry McDonald	Jane Street Theatre
1969	Treasure Island	Phil Avalon, Tony Barber, James Condon, Tom Mangan	UNSW Parade Theatre
1969	Rosencrantz and Guildenstern Are Dead	Gordon Glenwright, Ron Haddrick, Shane Porteous, Arthur Dignam	UNSW, SGIO Theatre, Brisbane, Playhouse, Canberra, Theatre Royal, Hobart
1970	95 Men and a Nannygoat		UNSW Parade Theatre
1970	Death of a Salesman	Ben Gabriel, Shane Porteous, John Wood	UNSW Parade Theatre
1970	The Guardsman	Joan Bruce, Penne Hackforth-Jones, Ron Haddrick, Lila Kedrova, Nita Pannell	UNSW Parade Theatre, Playhouse, Perth
1970	This Story of Yours	Joan Bruce, Drew Forsythe, Ron Haddrick, John Wood	UNSW Parade Theatre
1970	The Voyage of the Endeavour		UNSW Parade Theatre
1970	Cat Among the Pigeons	Peter Adams, Kirsty Child, John Derum, Ronald Falk, Doreen Warburton	UNSW Parade Theatre
1970	Major Barbara	Joan Bruce, Drew Forsythe, Brian James, Shane Porteous, Anna Volska, John Wood	UNSW Parade Theatre, Canberra Theatre
1970	The Legend of King O'Malley	Kate Fitzpatrick	UNSW Sir John Clancy Auditorium, Canberra Theatre, UNSW Parade Theatre, Theatre Royal, Hobart, Schonell Theatre, Brisbane
1970	The Prince and the Firebird	Wendy Blacklock, John Gregg, Sean Scully, Anna Volska	UNSW Parade Theatre
1970	King Oedipus	Ron Haddrick, Ruth Cracknell, James Condon, Ronald Falk, Shane Porteous, John Wood	UNSW Sir John Clancy Auditorium, Canberra Theatre, UNSW Old Tote Theatre
1970	The Hostage	Ronne Arnold, Wendy Blacklock, Ronald Falk, Drew Forsythe	UNSW Parade Theatre
1970	The Contemporary Dance Company of Australia		UNSW Parade Theatre
1970	Festival 2		UNSW Parade Theatre
1970	Biggles	Michael Boddy, Drew Forsythe, John Hargreaves, Ken Horler, Anna Volska	Nimrod Street Theatre
1970	Dick Whittington	Wendy Blacklock, Gordon Glenwright, Frank Lloyd	UNSW Parade Theatre
1971	Hoddel's Remarkable Handcart	Pat Bishop, Ronald Falk, John Gaden	UNSW Parade Theatre
1971	The Legend of King O'Malley	Jacki Weaver, Rex Cramphorn, Kate Fitzpatrick, Sandy Gore, Jeff Kevin, Nico Lathouris, Robyn Nevin	Phillip Street Theatre
1971	As You Like It	Diane Craig, John Hargreaves, Serge Lazareff, Garry McDonald, Helen Morse, Ken Shorter, Martin Vaughan	UNSW Parade Theatre
1971	King Oedipus	James Condon, Ruth Cracknell, Tommy Dysart, Ronald Falk, Drew Forsythe, John Gaden, Ron Haddrick, Paul Sonkkila, John Stanton	Princess Theatre, Octagon Theatre Perth, University of Adelaide
1971	The Man of Mode	Diane Craig, Anne Haddy, John Hargreaves, Melissa Jaffer, Garry McDonald, Helen Morse, Ken Shorter	UNSW Parade Theatre
1971	A Month in the Country	John Cousins, Diane Craig, Ronald Falk, Anne Haddy, John Hargreaves, Melissa Jaffer, Mark Lee, Martin Vaughan	UNSW Parade Theatre, Canberra Theatre
1971	Flash Jim Vaux	John Gaden, Bob Hornery, Sheila Kennelly, John Wood	Nimrod Street Theatre
1971	Land of Dreaming	Michael Aitkens, Rosemary Butcher, John Hamblin, Judy Morris, Max Phipps	UNSW Parade Theatre
1972	The Resistible Rise of Arturo Ui	John Bell, Ronald Falk, Drew Forsythe, John Hargreaves, Garry McDonald, Helen Morse	UNSW Parade Theatre, Canberra Theatre
1971	The Dutch Courtesan	Drew Forsythe, Anne Haddy, Garry McDonald, Helen Morse, Martin Vaughan	UNSW Parade Theatre
1971	The Crucible		UNSW Sir John Clancy Auditorium
1971	The National Health or Nurse Norton's Affair	Ronald Falk, Drew Forsythe, Ron Haddrick, Anne Haddy, John Hargreaves, Melissa Jaffer, Sheila Kennelly, Garry McDonald, Helen Morse, Ken Shorter, Martin Vaughan	UNSW Parade Theatre
1971	Peer Gynt	Christine Amor, Tony Llewellyn-Jones, Kris McQuade, Steven Tandy, John Walton	UNSW Old Tote Theatre
1971	Love Love Love	Barrie Ingham	UNSW Parade Theatre
1971	The Government Inspector	John Bell, Ron Haddrick	UNSW Parade Theatre
1971	Lasseter	Jeannie Lewis, Drew Forsythe, Helen Morse, Garry McDonald, John Waters	UNSW Parade Theatre
1971	The Resistible Rise of Arturo Ui	John Bell, Drew Forsythe, John Hargreaves, Garry McDonald, Helen Morse	UNSW Parade Theatre
1971	Brer Rabbit	Ronne Arnold, Gordon Chater, John Cousins, Max Cullen, Bob Hornery, Max Phipps	UNSW Parade Theatre
1972	Trelawny of the Wells	Christine Amor, Ruth Cracknell, Arthur Dignam	UNSW Parade Theatre
1972	The Taming of the Shrew	John Bell, Christine Amor, Helmut Bakaitis	UNSW Parade Theatre, Canberra Theatre
1972	A Country Girl	Andrew McFarlane, Elizabeth Alexander, John Jarratt, Ingrid Mason, Terry Peck, Angela Punch McGregor	UNSW Old Tote Theatre
1972	The Good Woman of Setzuan	Christine Amor, Arthur Dignam, Robyn Nevin, John Walton	UNSW Parade Theatre
1972	The Legend of King O'Malley	Chris Haywood, Edwin Hodgeman, Bob Hornery, Reg Livermore, Ken Shorter, Jacki Weaver	Civic Theatre, Suva, Mercury Theatre, Auckland, Downstage Theatre, Wellington, Hunter Theatre
1972	Tartuffe	Christine Amor, Drew Forsythe, Robyn Nevin, Martin Vaughan	UNSW Parade Theatre
1972	Macbeth	Helmut Bakaitis, Gil Tucker, John Walton	UNSW Parade Theatre
1972	Julius Caesar	Arthur Dignam, Drew Forsythe, Robyn Nevin	UNSW Sir John Clancy Auditorium
1972	Uncle Vanya	John Bell, John Gaden, Melissa Jaffer	UNSW Parade Theatre
1972	The Tempest	David Cameron, Gillian Jones, Nico Lathouris	University of Melbourne
1972	Forget-Me-Not Lane	Jacki Weaver, Christine Amor, Ruth Cracknell, Drew Forsythe, Ron Haddrick, Melissa Jaffer	UNSW Parade Theatre, UNSW Old Tote Theatre
1972	An Awful Rose		UNSW Parade Theatre
1972	Don's Party	Briony Behets, Pat Bishop, Wendy Blacklock, John Ewart, Gerard Maguire, Nick Tate	UNSW Parade Theatre, Playhouse Canberra
1972	How Could You Believe Me When I Said I'd Be Your Valet When You Know I've Been a Liar All My Life?	Christine Amor, Drew Forsythe, Ron Haddrick, Gil Tucker	UNSW Parade Theatre, Canberra Theatre
1972	Blop Goes The Weazel	James Condon, Maggie Dence, Denny Lawrence	UNSW Parade Theatre
1973	Don's Party	Briony Behets, Noeline Brown, John Ewart, Martin Harris, Judy Nunn	UNSW Old Tote Theatre, Warner Theatre Adelaide, Russell Street Theatre, Hunter Theatre Sydney, Theatre Royal, Hobart, Playhouse Perth, Canberra Theatre & regional tour
1973	’Tis Pity She’s a Whore	Drew Forsythe, Ron Haddrick, Anne Haddy	UNSW Parade Theatre, UNSW Old Tote Theatre
1973	The Clandestine Marriage	Wayne Jarratt, Andrew McFarlane, Terry Peck, Angela Punch McGregor	National Institute of Dramatic Art (NIDA)
1973	Arsenic and Old Lace	Ruth Cracknell, John Gaden	UNSW Parade Theatre
1973	Kabul	Arthur Dignam, Ronald Falk, Judi Farr	UNSW Parade Theatre
1973	Jugglers Three	Peter Adams, Sandy Gore, Anne Lucas, Gerard Maguire, Bruce Myles	Playhouse, Canberra, UNSW Parade Theatre
1973	Lysistrata	Joan Bruce, John Cousins, Ron Haddrick, Maggie Kirkpatrick	UNSW Parade Theatre
1973	The Playboy of the Western World	Colleen Fitzpatrick, Angela Punch McGregor	Sydney Opera House Drama Theatre
1973	Butley	Elizabeth Alexander, Patrick Ward, Peter Whitford	Independent Theatre, Playhouse, Canberra
1973	King Richard II	Ruth Cracknell, Drew Forsythe, John Gaden, Ron Haddrick, Dinah Shearing, Pamela Stephenson, George Whaley	Sydney Opera House Drama Theatre
1973	The Threepenny Opera	Kate Fitzpatrick, Gloria Dawn, Arthur Dignam, Drew Forsythe, Ivar Kants, Robin Ramsay, Pamela Stephenson	Sydney Opera House Drama Theatre
1973-74	What If You Died Tomorrow?	Ruth Cracknell, Drew Forsythe, John Gaden, Ron Haddrick, Max Phipps, Shane Porteous, Dinah Shearing	Sydney Opera House Drama Theatre, Elizabethan Theatre, Canberra Theatre, Comedy Theatre, Melbourne, Comedy Theatre, London
1973	An Eighteenth Century Soirée	Andrew McFarlane, John Jarratt	UNSW Old Tote Theatre
1974	Lear	Michael Caton, Ben Gabriel, Pamela Stephenson	UNSW Parade Theatre
1974	The Owl and the Pussy Cat Went to Sea	John Jarrat, Angela Punch McGregor, Tony Sheldon	Bankstown Town Hall, UNSW Parade Theatre
1974	Love for Love	James Condon, Ronald Falk, John Gaden	Sydney Opera House Drama Theatre
1974	Cradle of Hercules	Danny Adcock, Jack Charles, Don Crosby, Ronald Falk, John Gaden, David Gulpilil, Ivar Kants, Angela Punch McGregor, Peter Whitford	Sydney Opera House Drama Theatre
1974	The Miser	Penny Downie, Russell Kiefel, Kerry Walker	NIDA Theatre
1974	Ruzzante Returns from the Wars	Ivar Kants	UNSW Parade Theatre
1974	La Mandragola	Ingrid Mason, Pamela Stephenson	UNSW Parade Theatre
1974	Macbeth	Michael Caton, Ralph Cotterill, Colleen Fitzpatrick	Sydney Opera House Opera Theatre
1974	Oedipus Rex		UNSW Parade Theatre
1974	That Championship Season	Max Osbiston, Ken Wayne, Peter Whitford	UNSW Parade Theatre
1974	The Merchant of Venice	Penny Downie, Russell Kiefel	NIDA Theatre
1974	Little Eyolf	Ronald Falk, Angela Punch McGregor	UNSW Parade Theatre
1974	Three Men on a Horse	Noeline Brown, Ivar Kants, Norman Kaye, Ingrid Mason	Sydney Opera House Drama Theatre
1974	Fings Ain't Wot They Used T'be	Penny Downie, Russell Kiefel	NIDA Theatre
1974	The Chapel Perilous	Bille Brown, Ivar Kants	Sydney Opera House, Drama Theatre
1974	Equus	Ralph Cotterill, Ronald Falk	UNSW Parade Theatre
1974	Love's Labour's Lost	Jacki Weaver, John Bell	Sydney Opera House Drama Theatre
1974-75	Hotel Paradiso	Judith Arthy, Noeline Brown, Ralph Cotterill, Ronald Falk, Ivar Kants, Norman Kaye, Ingrid Mason, Julieanne Newbould, Angela Punch McGregor	UNSW Parade Theatre, Playhouse, Canberra
1974	What If You Died Tomorrow?	Ruth Cracknell, Ron Haddrick, Max Phipps, Shane Porteous, Dinah Shearing, Melissa Jaffer	Sydney Opera House Drama Theatre, Canberra Theatre, Comedy Theatre London, Elizabethan Theatre
1975	Berenice	Arthur Dignam, Vivienne Garrett, Robyn Nevin	Sydney Opera House Recording Hall
1975	Rio Rita	Colin Friels, Elaine Hudson	New South Wales
1975	Peer Gynt	John Derum, John Gaden, Ron Haddrick, Pamela Stephenson	Sydney Opera House Drama Theatre
1975	The School for Scandal	Elizabeth Cousens, Michael Crawford, Graham Little	Theatre 3 Canberra
1975	Chez Nous	Andrew McFarlane, Kevin Miles, Angela Punch McGregor, Carole Skinner, Peter Sumner	UNSW Parade Theatre
1975	Scapin	Arthur Dignam, Vivienne Garrett	Sydney Opera House Recording Hall
1975	Of Mice and Men	Gillian Jones, Hugh Keays-Byrne, Martin Vaughan	UNSW Parade Theatre, Sydney Opera House Drama Theatre, Playhouse Adelaide
1975	Hobson's Choice	John Bluthal, Ralph Cotterill, Diane Craig, Peter Weston	UNSW Parade Theatre
1975	The Importance of Being Earnest	Colleen Clifford, Kate Fitzpatrick, John Hargreaves, Edward Howell, Andrew McFarlane, Angela Punch McGregor, Peter Sumner	Sydney Opera House Drama Theatre
1975	The Freedom of the City	William Currey	New Theatre, Sydney
1975	The Seahorse	Jan Adele, John Clayton, Gerard Maguire	UNSW Parade Theatre
1975	Brief Lives	Roy Dotrice	Sydney Opera House Drama Theatre
1975	Home	Ruth Cracknell, Pat Evison, Ron Haddrick, Brian James	UNSW Parade Theatre, Canberra Theatre
1975	Ivanov	Andrew McFarlane, Robert Coleby, Ralph Cotterill	Sydney Opera House Drama Theatre
1975	An Evening with Katherine Mansfield	Pat Evison	UNSW Parade Theatre
1975	The Department	Carole Skinner	UNSW Parade Theatre
1975	Abelarde and Heloise		Sydney Opera House Drama Theatre
1975	The Miser	Penny Downie, Trevor Kent, Anne Lambert	UNSW Parade Theatre
1976	The Tempest		South Australia
1976	A Streetcar Named Desire	Jacki Weaver, John Clayton, Hugh Keays-Byrne, Robyn Nevin	Sydney Opera House Drama Theatre
1976	The Wolf	Philippa Baker, Elaine Hudson, Helen Morse, Dennis Olsen, Robin Ramsay	UNSW Parade Theatre
1976	Mourning Becomes Electra	Ron Haddrick, Ivar Kants, Robyn Nevin, Patrick Ward	Sydney Opera House Drama Theatre
1976	The Shrew	John Dommett, Penny Downie, Elaine Hudson	Sydney Opera House Recording Hall
1976	The Brass Hat	James Condon, Ralph Cotterill, Anne Haddy, Ric Hutton, Kevin Miles	UNSW Parade Theatre
1976	The Matchmaker	Carol Burns, Penny Downie, Ron Haddrick, Elaine Hudson, Tony Llewellyn-Jones, Betty Lucas, Doreen Warburton	Sydney Opera House Drama Theatre
1976	Habeas Corpus	Bruce Barry, Ruth Cracknell, Ronald Falk, Judi Farr, Gordon McDougall, Gwen Plumb, Dorothy Vernon	UNSW Parade Theatre, Theatre Royal
1976	The Shoemaker's Holiday	Michael Aitkens, Ron Blanchard, Alan Cinis, James Condon, Maggie Dence, Penny Downie, Drew Forsythe, Ian Gilmour, Elaine Hudson, Redmond Phillips, Robert Shaw, John Walton	Sydney Opera House Drama Theatre
1976	Otherwise Engaged	Pat Bishop, Ralph Cotterill, Kevin Miles, Rod Mullinar, Robyn Nevin	UNSW Parade Theatre
1976	A Doll's House	Peter Collingwood, Peter Sumner	Sydney Opera House Drama Theatre
1976	Equus	Danny Adcock, Ronald Falk, Ben Gabriel, Roger Griffiths, Betty Lucas, Diana Perryman	York Theatre (Seymour Centre)
1976	A Toast to Melba	Ralph Cotterill, Drew Forsythe	UNSW Parade Theatre
1976	The Season at Sarsaparilla	Kate Fitzpatrick, Elizabeth Alexander, Michael Carman, Max Cullen, Michele Fawdon, Bill Hunter, John Jarratt, Robyn Nevin, Julieanne Newbould, John Orcsik, Peter Whitford	Sydney Opera House Drama Theatre
1976-77	Rookery Nook	Lynette Curran, Ronald Falk, Judi Farr, Ric Hutton, Norman Kaye, Betty Lucas	UNSW Parade Theatre
1977	The Magistrate	Brandon Burke, Drew Forsythe, Jennifer Hagan, Edward Howell, Fay Kelton, Max Osbiston, Redmond Phillips, Phillip Ross, Peter Rowley	Sydney Opera House Drama Theatre
1977	The Plough and the Stars	Danny Adcock, Ron Haddrick, Anne Haddy, Lorna Lesley, Betty Lucas, Martin Vaughan	Playhouse, Perth, Sydney Opera House Drama Theatre
1977	The Father	Aileen Britton, Richard Meikle, Diana Perryman, Angela Punch McGregor, Richard Ussher	UNSW Parade Theatre
1977	The Alchemist	Brandon Burke, Peter Collingwood, Grant Dodwell, Redmond Phillips, Peter Rowley, Bruce Spence, Kerry Walker, Peter Whitford	UNSW Parade Theatre
1977	Caesar and Cleopatra	James Condon, John Frawley, Ron Graham, Elaine Hudson, Lorna Lesley, Richard Meikle, Robyn Nevin, Patrick Ward, John Waters	Sydney Opera House Drama Theatre
1977	Othello		University of New England, Arts Theatre, NIDA Theatre
1977	Unspeakable Acts		UNSW Parade Theatre
1977	Dr. Brain's Body	Brian Blain, Ron Haddrick, Shane Porteous, Catherine Wilkin	UNSW Parade Theatre
1977	Wild Oats	Abigail, Philippa Baker, Edward Howell, Lex Marinos, Garth Meade, Richard Meikle, Barry Otto	York Theatre (Seymour Centre)
1977	The Ultimate Obscenity	Ron Haddrick, Redmond Phillips, Phillip Ross	UNSW Parade Theatre
1977	Three Sisters	Jacki Weaver, Elizabeth Alexander, Queenie Ashton, Ben Gabriel, Ric Hutton, Monica Maughan, Peter Whitford	Sydney Opera House Drama Theatre
1977	Big Toys	Kate Fitzpatrick, Max Cullen, Arthur Dignam	UNSW Parade Theatre, Comedy Theatre, Melbourne, Canberra Theatre
1977	The Norman Conquests	Judi Farr, Jennifer Hagan, Veronica Lang, Tony Llewellyn-Jones	York Theatre (Seymour Centre)
1977	The Time Is Not Yet Ripe	Joan Bruce, Peter Collingwood, Ric Hutton, Maggie Kirkpatrick, Helen Morse, Redmond Phillips	Sydney Opera House Drama Theatre
1977	The Captain of Kopenick	George Baker	New Theatre, Sydney
1977	Mothers and Fathers	Tina Bursill, Kerry McGuire	UNSW Parade Theatre
1977	The Lower Depths	John Bell, Ralph Cotterill, Ronald Falk, Ben Gabriel, Trevor Kent, Maggie Kirkpatrick, Betty Lucas, Kris McQuade	Sydney Opera House Drama Theatre
1977	Obsessive Behaviour in Small Spaces	Liddy Clark, Michele Fawdon, John Jarratt	UNSW Parade Theatre
1977	The Tempest	James Condon, Ralph Cotterill, Michael Craig, Jon Ewing, Russell Kiefel, Barry Otto	Sydney Opera House Drama Theatre
1978	The Cat and the Canary	Peter Rowley, Peter Whitford	UNSW Parade Theatre
1978	Angel City		York Theatre (Seymour Centre)
1978	Black Comedy	Judi Farr, Trevor Kent, Russell Kiefel, Robyn Nevin, Barry Otto	Sydney Opera House Drama Theatre
1978	Miss Julie	Judi Farr, Robyn Nevin	Sydney Opera House Drama Theatre
1978	Just Between Ourselves	Joan Bruce, Peter Whitford	UNSW Parade Theatre
1978	The Misanthrope	Kate Fitzpatrick, Jon Ewing. Judi Farr, Russell Kiefel, Judy Nunn	Sydney Opera House Drama Theatre
1978	Da	Tom Burlinson, Maggie Kirkpatrick	UNSW Parade Theatre
1978	Hay Fever	Ronald Falk, Patricia Kennedy, David Nettheim, Judy Nunn, Barry Otto	Canberra Theatre, Sydney Opera House Drama Theatre
1978	The Knack	Grant Dodwell, Robert Hughes	UNSW Parade Theatre
1978	The Night of the Iguana	Ronald Falk, Judi Farr, Peter Fisher, Doris Goddard, Mark Hembrow, Maggie Kirkpatrick, Lorna Lesley, Max Phipps	Sydney Opera House Drama Theatre
1978	King Richard		La Boite Theatre
1978	Widowers' Houses	Annie Byron, Peter Collingwood, Ken Hannam, Ivar Kants, Norman Kaye	UNSW Parade Theatre
1978	The Lady from Maxim's	Maggie Dence, Jon Ewing, Ronald Falk, Michele Fawdon, Willie Fennell, Gary Files, Peter Fisher, Joyce Jacobs, Marie Lloyd, Judy Nunn, Barry Otto, Walter Plinge	Sydney Opera House Drama Theatre
1979	Lady of the Camellias		

== Alumni ==
Notable actors, such as Ruth Cracknell, Ron Haddrick, Neil Fitzpatrick, Jacki Weaver, John Bell, Dinah Shearing, Helmut Bakaitis, Robyn Nevin, Elizabeth Alexander, Reg Livermore, Dennis Olsen, Gary Files, Robin Lovejoy and Jennifer Hagan appeared in more than 90 productions of the classics and contemporary plays from the international repertoire.

Other notable actor alumni include Allana Coorey, Andrew McFarlane, Angela Punch-McGregor, Anna Volska, Anne Haddy, Annie Byron, Arthur Dignam, Barry Otto, Bill Hunter, Bob Maza, Brian James, Bruce Spence, Carmen Duncan, Chris Haywood, Colin Friels, Danny Adcock, David Gulpilil, David Williamson, Don Crosby, Garry McDonald, Gillian Jones, Gordon Chater, Grant Dodwell, Gwen Plumb, Ivar Kants, Jack Charles, John Clayton, John Gaden, John Jarratt, Joyce Jacobs, Judi Farr, Judy Nunn, Julieanne Newbould, Kate Fitzpatrick, Kris McQuade, Lynette Curran, Maggie Dence, Maggie Kirkpatrick, Mark Hembrow, Max Cullen, Max Phipps, Mervyn Drake, Michele Fawdon, Nico Lathouris, Pamela Stephenson, Peter Sumner, Peter Whitford, Queenie Ashton, Rob Steele, Robert Coleby, Ron Graham, Ronald Falk, Shane Porteous, Sophie Stewart, Sylvanna Doolan, Thomas Keneally, Tom Burlinson, Tom Oliver and Tony Llewellyn-Jones.

Jim Sharman became interested in directing experimental theatre and he soon made a name for himself in Sydney with his productions at the Old Tote Theatre Company many of which were designed by his long-time collaborator Brian Thomson. Director Richard Wherrett also directed productions for the Old Tote.

== See also ==
- Kenneth Shave
