= Ben Gabriel =

Australian actor and director

- Born: James Vernon Gabriel; 25 February 1918; Weymouth, Dorset, England, United Kingdom
- Died: 25 April 2012 (aged 94)
- Occupations: Actor; director; voice artist; theatre co-founder
- Years active: 1939-2002
- Spouse(s): Doreen Warburton (OBE) (also known as Evelyn Ward) actress, director, theatre co-founder
- Family: Ethel Florence Gabriel (McConnell) (1888–1967) actress, costume designer and maker

Ben Gabriel (25 February 1918 – 25 April 2012) was an English Australian character actor, director, voice artist and theatre founder. Gabriel had numerous appearances in stage and radio roles and in film and television.

== Early life ==
Gabriel was born as James Vernon Gabriel in Weymouth, Dorset, England. His mother Ethel Florence McConnell, was born in Kent, England and was an actress and costume designer, who was professionally known as Ethel Gabriel (31 October 1888 – 23 May 1967) Ethel came to Australia in 1919 as a war bride and worked as an actress with the Australian Elizabethan Theatre Trust, featuring in such productions as Ray Lawler's Summer of the Seventeenth Doll. and also toured in that production in the West End and on Broadway, she appeared also in the 1959 film adaptation.

Gabriel grew up in Sydney and Wollongong and saw war service as a lance-sergeant for six years with the 9th division during World War II. He officially changed his stage name to Ben Gabriel, a name he had always used on a personal basis.

== Career ==
Gabriel's career began in theatre in the late 1930s and he appeared with his mum in touring productions of Summer of the Seventeenth Doll in 1959 and 1960, continuing roles with the Sydney Theatre Company in Three Sisters and The Lower Depths and also the Ensemble Theatre as a holocaust survivor in a A Shayna Maidel. In 1963, he founded the Q Theatre with his wife-to-be and others, originally operating at Circular Quay and then in Penrith.

Gabriel's television career spanned from the early 1960s until the late 1980s. One of his early roles was as the alien leader, 'the Soshun', in the ABC science fiction series The Stranger. Gabriel appeared in numerous early productions of Homicide, Matlock Police and Division 4, all part of the Crawford Productions banner.

He became best known for his role in Contrabandits as Jim Shirley, winning the Penguin Award for Best Supporting Actor. Character roles were aplenty in soap operas and serials from Sons and Daughters, Prisoner, Home and Away, All Saints, and Skippy the Bush Kangaroo.

His film repertoire extended with roles in such gems as The Office Picnic, The Mango Tree, Break of Day and Fighting Back.

== Filmography ==
=== Television ===
Year	Title	Role	Type
1961	Whiplash	Ted Cammidge	TV series, 1 episode
1961	The Outcasts	Dr Jamieson	TV miniseries, 1 episode
1964	Consider Your Verdict		TV series, 1 episode
1965	The Stranger	Soshun	TV series, 4 episodes
1965–1975	Homicide	Father Coghlan / Grant / Clarrie Lucas / Ronald Marshall / Maleski / Robert Morton / Billy Garret / Joe Johnston / Chester Bradley / Gordon Carstairs / Stan Harris / Charles Kemp / Tim Latimer	TV series, 13 episodes
1966	The Interpretaris	Parta Beno	TV miniseries, 6 episodes
1967	My Name's McGooley, What's Yours?		TV series, 1 episode
1967	Australian Playhouse	Old Man	TV series, 1 episode
1967	Love and War	Fred	TV miniseries, 1 episode
1967–1968	Contrabandits	Jim Shirley	TV series, 30 episodes
1968	Skippy the Bush Kangaroo	Receptionist	TV series, 1 episode
1969	Riptide	Fenwick	TV series, 1 episode
1969–1975	Division 4	Various roles	TV series, 11 episodes
1970	The Rovers	Horace Soames	TV series, 1 episode
1970	Delta	Lawson	TV series, 1 episode
1971	The Group	Mr Sebel	TV series, 1 episode
1971	Barrier Reef	Sergeant Dwyer	TV series, 1 episode
1970–1971	Dynasty	'Unk' Martel	TV series, 22 episodes
1972	Lane End	Chris Pappas	TV miniseries, 7 episodes
1972	Boney	Snr Constable Sassoon	TV series, 1 episode
1972	The Far Country		TV miniseries
1972–1973	Over There	Pop	TV series, 7 episodes
1972, 1975	Behind the Legend	John Monash	TV anthology series, 2 episodes
1973	Ryan	Vedat Avdi	TV series, 1 episode
1973	The Evil Touch	Dr Phillips	TV series, 1 episode
1974	This Love Affair		Anthology TV series, 1 episode
1974	Rush	Reverend Smith	TV series, 1 episode
1974	A Touch of Reverence		TV miniseries
1971–1975	Matlock Police	Various roles	TV series, 7 episodes
1975	The Last of the Australians	Arnold Harris	TV series, 1 episode
1975	Cash and Company	Lucky	TV miniseries, episode 5: "Intersection"
1975	Ben Hall	MacKenzie	TV miniseries, 3 episodes
1975	Quality of Mercy		TV series, 1 episode
1975	Shannon's Mob	Aklov	TV series, 1 episode
1975	King's Men	Marshi	TV series, 1 episode
1978	Glenview High	Dr Watts	TV series, 1 episode
1978	Case for the Defence	Edward Freeman	TV series, 1 episode
1978	Chopper Squad	The Lighthouse Keeper	TV series, 1 episode
1979	Prisoner	Edward Warner / Ted Warner	TV series, 6 episodes
1982	MPSIB	Tom	TV series, 1 episode
1983	Sons and Daughters	Bert Wilkins	TV series, 254 episodes
1988	Australians	San Francisco Doctor	Anthology TV series, episode 6: "Lola Montez"
1988	Rafferty's Rules	George	TV series, 1 episode
1989	G.P.	Vittorio	TV series, 2 episodes
1989	E Street	William Jackman	TV series, 2 episodes
1983–1990	A Country Practice	Dr Hamish Wood / Snow Brennan / Billy Perkins	TV series, 10 episodes
1991	The Flying Doctors	Franz Josef	TV series, 1 episode
1996	Home and Away	Harry Prendegrast	TV series, 3 episodes
1997	Fallen Angels	Giuliano Mazzoni	TV series, 1 episode
1998–2002	All Saints	Mr Henderson / Mr Kucharski	TV series, 2 episodes

=== Film ===
Year	Title	Role	Type
1955	Three in One: Joe Wilson's Mates	The Priest	Anthology film
1957	The Three Drovers		TV movie
1960	Turning Point	Steve Pringle	TV movie
1961	A Little South of Heaven	Eddy	TV movie
1963	The Dreaming	Narrator	Short film
1964	Bertrand	Mr Watson	TV movie
1966	The Man Who Saw It	Whit Morgan	TV movie
1970	Strange Holiday		TV movie
1972	The Office Picnic	Mr Johnson, the Boss	Feature film
1973	Flashpoint	Mine Manager	Feature film
1976	Let the Balloon Go	Mr Sumner	Feature film
1976	Break of Day	Mr Evans	Feature film
1976	God Knows Why, But It Works	First Doctor	Short film
1977	The Mango Tree	Wilkenshaw	Feature film
1977	The Claim		Documentary
1979	Vox Pop		Short film
1981	A Step in the Right Direction		TV movie
1981	Hoodwink	Martin's Father	Feature film
1982	Fighting Back	Moreland	Feature film
1985	I Can't Get Started	Lazarus	Feature film
1988	Touch the Sun: Princess Kate	Taxi Driver	TV movie
1992	Resistance	Quincy	Feature film
2001	My Husband, My Killer	Andrew Kalajzich	TV movie

== Theatre ==
Year	Title	Role	Type
1939	1066 And All That		Theatre Royal, Sydney
1945	The Doctor's Dilemma		Independent Theatre, Sydney
1949	A Marriage of Convenience		Independent Theatre, Sydney
1950	Bound East for Cardiff		Independent Theatre, Sydney
1950	The Long Voyage Home		Independent Theatre, Sydney
1950	Moon of the Caribees		Independent Theatre, Sydney
1950	In the Zone		Independent Theatre, Sydney
1950	S.S Glencairn		Independent Theatre, Sydney
1951	Madam Louise		Palace Theatre, Sydney with Ben Fuller
1954	The Two Bouquets	Julian Bromley	Independent Theatre, Sydney
1957	The Willow Pattern Plate	Fisherman / Coolie	Phillip Street Theatre, Sydney
1958	The Shifting Heart	Donny Pratt	National Theatre, Launceston, Theatre Royal, Hobart, Comedy Theatre, Melbourne with AET Trust
1958–1960	Summer of the Seventeenth Doll	Barney	Theatre Royal, Adelaide, Regional Australian tour, Theatre Royal, Adelaide, Grand Opera House, Wellington, Gisborne, New Zealand, His Majesty's Theatre, Auckland with AET Trust, J. C. Williamson & New Zealand Players
1960	The Square Ring	Joe	ABC TV Studios, Sydney
1960	Hunger of a Girl		Independent Theatre, Sydney
1961	Roots		Independent Theatre, Sydney
1961	A Little South of Heaven	Eddie	ABC TV Studios, Sydney
1961, 1966	The One Day of the Year	Wacka	Arts Council tour, Cooma Town Hall & Tokyo
1963	Macbeth		Tasmania with Curtain Theatre Company & AET Trust
1963	Henry V		Tasmania with Curtain Theatre Company & AET Trust
1963	Rashomon		Independent Theatre, Sydney with AET Trust
1963	The Dumb Waiter		AMP Theatrette, Sydney with Q Theatre Company
1964	George		AMP Theatrette, Sydney with Q Theatre Company
1964	The Proposal		AMP Theatrette, Sydney with Q Theatre Company
1964	The End of the Beginning		AMP Theatrette, Sydney with Q Theatre Company
1964	Rusty Bugles		Independent Theatre, Sydney
1964	Sweet Day of Decision		Old Tote Theatre, Sydney with AET Trust
1965	The Dock Brief	Herbert Fowle	West End Rialto, Brisbane with Q Theatre Company
1965	The Proposal	Stephan Stepanovich Choobukov	West End Rialto, Brisbane with Q Theatre Company
1965	The Business of Good Government		Assembly Hall, Sydney with Q Theatre Company
1966	Tiny Alice	Julian	Old Tote Theatre Company
1966	The Gents		AMP Theatrette, Sydney with Q Theatre Company & AET Trust
1966	Summer of the Seventeenth Doll		AMP Theatrette, Sydney
1968	Dick Whittington and His Cat		Independent Theatre, Sydney
1969	Narrow Road to the Deep North		Independent Theatre, Sydney
1970	Death of a Salesman	Willy Loman	Old Tote Theatre, Sydney
1972	The Dock Brief		AMP Theatrette, Sydney
1974	Lear	King Lear	Old Tote Theatre, Sydney
1975	The Department	Gordon	Marian Street Theatre with Northside Theatre Company & AET Trust
1975	A Breeze from the Gulf		The Australian Theatre, Sydney with Peter Williams Productions
1976	All Over	The Doctor	Nimrod Theatre, Sydney
1976	Perfectly All Right		Nimrod Theatre, Sydney
1976	The Joss Adams Show		Nimrod Theatre, Sydney
1976	Sextet		Nimrod Theatre, Sydney
1976	Equus	Frank Strang	Seymour Centre, Sydney with Old Tote Theatre Company
1977	The Business of Good Government		Assembly Hall, Sydney
1977	The Three Sisters	Chebutykin	Sydney Opera House with Sydney Theatre Company
1977	The Entertainer	Voice of Brother Bill	Q Theatre, Penrith
1977	The Lower Depths	Luka	Sydney Opera House with Sydney Theatre Company with Old Tote Theatre Company
1978	Don't Piddle Against the Wind, Mate	Bob Davies	SGIO Theatre, Brisbane with Queensland Theatre
1978	King Lear	Gloucester	SGIO Theatre, Brisbane with Queensland Theatre Company
1979	King Richard	'King' Richard Brown	ABC Radio Sydney
1979	Kookaburra	Bill Clare	ABC Radio Sydney
1979	The Department	Bobby	Q Theatre, Penrith, Marsden Theatre, Parramatta, Bankstown Town Hall
1979	The Devil's Disciple	Lawyer Hawkins / Rev Brudenell	Sydney Opera House
1980	A Night with the Q: The Dock Brief / The Sponge Room / The Proposal		Q Theatre, Penrith with AET Trust
1980	Measure for Measure	Escalus	Q Theatre, Penrith
1980	Travelling North	Freddy	Q Theatre, Penrith
1980	The Homecoming	Max	Q Theatre, Penrith
1980	Happy End	Reverend	Q Theatre, Penrith
1981	War Horse	Jack Armstrong	Q Theatre, Penrith, Orange Civic Theatre
1981	No Names... No Pack Drill	Browning	Q Theatre, Penrith
1981	Buried Child	Dodge	Q Theatre, Penrith, Bankstown Town Hall, Sydney, Orange Civic Theatre
1981	On Our Selection	Dad Rudd	Q Theatre, Penrith, Orange Civic Theatre
1982	What the Butler Saw		Q Theatre, Penrith
1982	The Club		Q Theatre, Penrith
1982	Molly Dies		Q Theatre, Penrith
1982	Charley's Aunt	Brassett	Q Theatre, Penrith, Orange Civic Theatre
1983	The Cherry Orchard		Sydney Opera House with STC
1983	Sweeney Todd	Beadle	Q Theatre, Penrith
1984	The Pillars of Society	Aune	Sydney Opera House
1985	Reedy River	Alf	Q Theatre, Penrith (also Director)
1985	What If You Died Tomorrow?		Marian Street Theatre, Sydney with Northside Theatre Company
1986	No Sugar	Sergeant & Neal	National Arts Centre, Ottawa, West End Community Centre, Vancouver for Vancouver Expo, Fitzroy Town Hall, Melbourne with AET Trust & Western Australian Theatre Company
1987	Down an Alley Filled With Cats		Q Theatre, Penrith
1987, 1988	The Department	Gordon	Seymour Centre, Sydney, Melbourne Athenaeum with Elston, Hocking and Woods, Northside Theatre Company & AET Trust
1988	Interplay '88		Sydney Opera House
1988	A Dream Play		Playhouse, Adelaide with STCSA, Sydney Opera House with STC for Festival of Sydney
1989	Say Goodbye to the Past	Ghost of a Shakespearean actor	Stables Theatre, Sydney with Griffin Theatre Company
1989	Windy Gully		Bridge Theatre, Coniston, New Theatre, Sydney with Theatre South
1990	My Son The Lawyer Is Drowning	God	Ensemble Theatre, Sydney
1991	A Shayna Maidel	Holocaust Survivor	Ensemble Theatre, Sydney
1994	Brilliant Lies		Civic Playhouse, Newcastle with Hunter Valley Theatre Company
	The Harp in the South		MTC

== Personal life and legacy ==
In 1949, Gabriel married opera singer Rhonney Webber. Together they had one daughter, but soon divorced less than ten years later.

In 1969, he married actress and director Doreen Warburton (OBE), who was also born in London, England, but had emigrated to Australia in 1953 and was awarded the OBE in 1972.

Gabriel died on 25 April 2012, at the age of 94. His wife, his daughter Laura and son John survived him after his death.

Australian actor Noel Hodda, during his eulogy, described Ben Gabriel as "an old school actor – there to serve the writer, the story and the director and by doing that, serving the audience."
