= Frank Lloyd (actor) =

Australian actor

- Frank Lloyd as Neville McPhee in Home and Away
- Born: Frank Gerard Lloyd born; Sydney, Australia
- Died: 15 December 1995; Potts Point, New South Wales, Australia
- Other name: Frank Maxwell (credited as)
- Occupations: Actor, film script translator
- Years active: early 1930s-1992
- Known for: Home and Away as Neville McPhee

Frank Gerard Lloyd (died; 15 December 1995, Potts Point, New South Wales, Australia) credited briefly as Frank Maxwell was an Australian actor, best known for his brief fifteen-month stint in the TV series Home and Away as retired carnival worker Neville McPhee, alongside his co-star Sheila Kennelly who played his wife Floss McPhee. Lloyd's long career spanned five decades starting from the 1930s as a featured player in radio plays, during the "Golden Age of Australian Radio", he worked in all sectors of the genre, including soft shoe and as a traditional song-and-dance man, but was well known through his character parts on television and film, and most especially for his long tenure in the theatre.

== Early life ==
Lloyd's was born in Sydney, New South Wales and started working an after-school job as an office boy at 2GB Sydney radio.

== Career ==
=== Radio, TV and film ===
Lloyd started his early career in the early Golden Days of Australian Radio, whilst working at 2GB, he was asked by producers to appear in radio plays for its listeners, subsequently after finishing his schooling, he travelled to England, and whilst in the United Kingdom, he had small characters roles in the films Let Us Be True in 1953 and The Battle of the River Plate in 1956.

He then travelled to New York where he appeared in the stage play The Drunkard, returning to Australia, he would later play small roles in Australian films including Mr. Tinkle in Around the World in Eighty Ways, Those Dear Departed and Fast Talking.. He also served a script translator and dubber of international stage and film,

He served in Moscow International Ministry of the Arts.

Lloyd was perhaps best known for his 15-month stint in TV series Home and Away in 1988, as one of 16 original characters, in the role of retired carnival worker Neville McPhee. He appeared in the first 109 episodes, opposite Sheila Kennelly who played his wife Floss. Both actors were subsequently written out of the series, with producers stating they wanted to focus more on a younger cast and updated formula.

He featured in many guest character roles in soap operas, serials and telemovies, with parts in The Young Doctors as (Ted Wilcox), Prisoner, Sons and Daughters, and A Country Practice. He had guest roles on sitcoms including Mother and Son and Boys from the Bush.

=== Theatre ===
Lloyd, although primarily known for small role's in TV and film worked regularly in theatre throughout his career, including both dramatic roles in Shakespeare to traditional pantomime, notable he featured in Twelfth Night, Othello, The Wizard of Oz, The Man of La Mancha, Annie, The Diary of Anne Frank, as well as a longer year-long stint in a production of Guys and Dolls.

== Personal life and death ==
Lloyd was badly injured in a car crash, in Greece alongside Canadian actor and musician Donald Harvie (1929–2011) in 1963.

Lloyd died in Potts Point, Sydney, Australia on 15 December 1995, from unspecified causes. His obituary was published in a Sydney Morning Herald newspaper, stating he was survived by his wife Noreen and son Frank Lloyd Jr. though his death was never mentioned in any mainstream media, hence until the late 2010s that he may still be living, though his whereabouts were unknown, until industry researchers located the clipping in the articles archives.

== Filmography ==
=== Film ===
Year	Title	Role	Type
1953	Let Us Be True	Derek	TV movie
1955	The Battle of the River Plate	Messenger, HMS Achilles (uncredited)	Feature film
1967	The School Mistress		TV movie
1967	Love and War: Intersection		TV movie
1976	Caddie	Raffle Man	Featire film biopic
1984	Fast Talking	Career Advisor	Feature film
1984	Queen of the Damned	Brisbane Freight Manager	Feature film
1987	Those Dear Departed	Catholic Priest	Feature film
1988	Around the World In 80 Days	Mr. Tinkle	Direct-to-video film
1993	You and Me and Uncle Bob	Horrie	Feature film

=== Television ===
Year	Title	Role	Type
1953–1955	BBC Sunday Night Theatre	Charlie	TV series
1956	The Errol Flynn Theatre	Thomas	TV series
1960	General Motors Presents		TV series
1962	Shoestring Theatre		
1969	Homicide	Alistair James	TV series
1969	Tilley Landed On Our Shore		Television play
1971	The Group		TV series
1974	Behind the Legend	Eddie Gilbert	TV series
1976	Luke's Kingdom	Broker	TV series
1978	Father Dear Father In Australia	Herbert Watson	TV series
1979	Love Thy Neighbour in Australia	Doctor	TV series
1982	Sons and Daughters	Doctor Stevens (as Frank Maxwell)	TV series
1983	The Young Doctors	Ted Wilcox	TV series
1986	Return to Eden	Caretaker	TV series
1986	Mother and Son	Catholic Priest	TV series
1986	Prisoner	Detective No. 2	TV series
1988–1989	Home and Away	Neville McPhee	TV series, 109 episodes
1982–1992	A Country Practice	-Reg "Soapy" Jackson -Neville Potts -Harold Gleason -Cliff Sutton	TV series
1992	Boys from the Bush	Ralph	TV series

== Theatre ==
Year	Title	Role	Venue / Company
1946	Twelfth Night		Independent Theatre
1956	Ned Kelly	Mackin / Curnow	Elizabethan Theatre
1957	Hippo Dancing		Princess Theatre
1957–58	Salad Days	Troppo / A Slave || Princess Theatre, Melbourne, Elizabethan Theatre, Theatre Royal, Adelaide	
1957	Witness for the Prosecution		Princess, Theatre Melbourne
1957	Jack and Jill		Princess Theatre, Melbourne
1957	Peter Pan		Princess Theatre, Melbourne
1958	Free as Air		Princess Theatre. Melbourne
1958	Aladdin in the Wonderful Lamp		Princess Theatre, Melbourne
1960	Christmas in the Market Place		Assembly Hall, Sydney
1963	The Wizard of Oz		Tivoli Theatre, Melbourne
1964	Finian's Rainbow		Princess Theatre, Melbourne
1985	The Country Wife		UNSW Old Tote Theatre
1965	Othello		UNSW Old Tote Theatre
1965	The Representative		UNSW Old Tote Theatre
1965	Chase Me Comrade		Her Majesty's Theatre, Adelaide
1966	Muriel's Virtues		Independent Theatre, Sydney
1966	The Fantasticks		Phillip Theatre
1966	A Refined Look at Existence		Jane Street Theatre, UNSW Old Tote Theatre
1967	Red Peppers		AMP Theatrette Sydney
1967	The Schoolmistress		UNSW Old Tote Theatre
1968	Swan Song		AMP Theatrette, Sydney
1968	Summer in the Country		AMP Theatrette, Sydney
1968	The Boy Friend		Phillip Theatre, Comedy Theatre
1968	At Least You Get Something Out of That	Don Posey	UNSW Old Tote Theatre
1970	The Love of Don Perlimplín and Belisa in the Garden		AMP Theatrette, Sydney
1970	The Trials of Hilary Pouncefortt		Neutral Bay Music Hall
1970	Dick Whittington		UNSW Parade Theatre
1971	Exposed to Danger, or, Little Nell in the Klondyke		Neutral Bay Music Hall
1972	The Spring Heeled Terror of Stepney Green	Freddy Rich & Mighty Tich	Sydney Theatre Music Hall, Neutral Bay Music Hall
1973	Dimboola		Bonaparte's Theatre Restaurant
1974	Doctor in the House	Bromley	Princess Theatre, Melbourne
1976	Man of La Mancha	Barber	Her Majesty's Theatre, Melbourne, Her Majesty's Theatre, Sydney, Newcastle Civic Theatre
1978–79	Treasure Island	Tom Redruth	Clark Island, Sydney
1979	Alladyce and the Holy Virago	President	ABC Radio
1979–80	The Wizard of Oz	Wizard	Victorian Country Tour & New South Wales & Regent Theatre, Canberra Theatre, Albury, Wangaratta, Wagga Wagga, Townsville Civic Centre
1979	Fanny	The Admiral	Marian Street Theatre
1980	Deathtrap	Porter Milgrim	Townsville Civic Centre
1981	I Sent a Letter to My Love	Huw Price	SGIO Theatre
1981	Annie	FDR	SGIO Theatre, Pilbeam Theatre, Rockhampton, Townsville Civic Theatre, Mount Isa Civic Centre, Her Majesty's Theatre, Brisbane
1984, 1987	The Diary of Anne Frank	Wizard	Phillip Street Theatre
1985	Jack and Jill - The Panto	Mother Hubbard	Tivoli Theatre Restaurant Sydney
	The Drunkard		
1987	Guys and Dolls	Arvide Abernathy	Her Majesty's Theatre Adelaide
1991	Australia Felix	Voice of Harding	Stables Theatre
