= John Gaden =

Australian actor and director (born 1941)

John Gaden AO
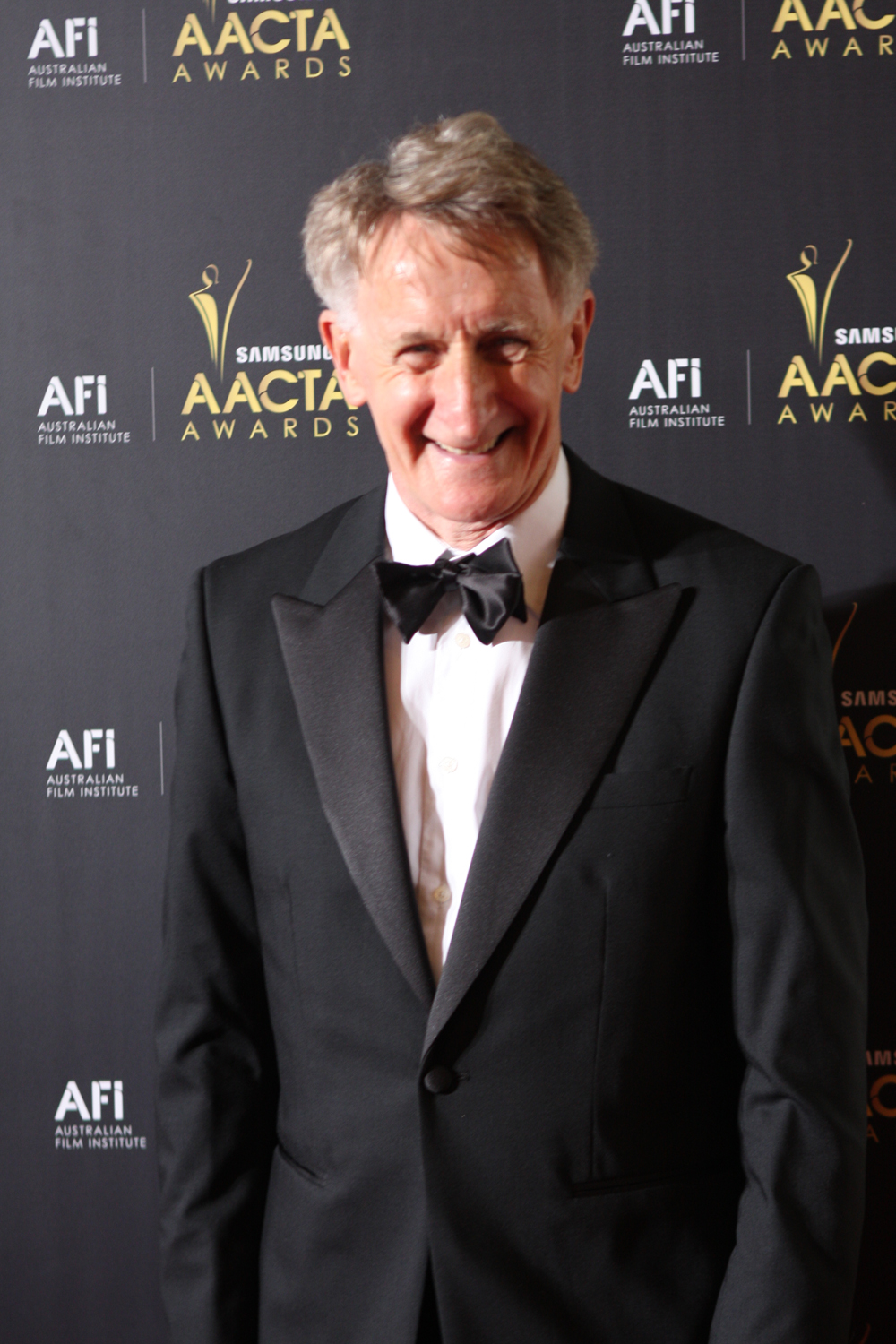
- Gaden at the 2012 AACTA Awards
- Born: 13 November 1941 (age 84); Sydney, New South Wales, Australia
- Occupations: Actor, director
- Years active: 1960–present

John Stuart Gaden AO (born 13 November 1941) is an Australian actor and director known particularly for his stage career, although he has also made some film and television appearances.

== Career ==
John Gaden was born in Sydney where his father owned a successful legal practice, Gadens. He attended Cranbrook School, Sydney, where he performed in various school plays. After school he studied arts and law at the University of Sydney. After appearing with the Sydney University Dramatic Society, he decided to pursue a theatrical career in lieu of a legal one.

His professional career started in the early 1960s. In 1970 he appeared in a production of Hadrian the Seventh in Perth, directed by Sir Tyrone Guthrie, and with fellow actors Arthur Dignam and Judy Nunn. Guthrie was impressed enough with Gaden to recommend him to Robin Lovejoy, who cast him in a production of The Crucible, which resulted in a positive review from The Sydney Morning Herald's theatre critic Harry Kippax, which in turn led to a three-year contract with the Old Tote Theatre Company (the precursor of the Sydney Theatre Company). He has also recorded audiobooks of British children's series Fireman Sam and Australian children's series Magic Mountain.

He performed many roles with Sydney's Nimrod Theatre Company in the 1970s. For three years he was associate director of the Sydney Theatre Company with Richard Wherrett, during which time he directed and co-directed the notable production of The Life and Times of Nicholas Nickleby.

From 1986 to 1989 Gaden was artistic director of the State Theatre Company of South Australia based in Adelaide. In Adelaide he co-directed various productions with Gale Edwards. He has also appeared with the Belvoir St Theatre and the Queensland Theatre Company.

Gaden had a strong connection with novelist and playwright Patrick White. He performed in a 1980 ABC TV adaptation of White's play Big Toys, a 1985 production of his play Signal Driver: A Morality Play for the Times and the film of White's novel The Eye of the Storm. As Artistic Director of the State Theatre Company of South Australia, Gaden commissioned White's final play, Shepherd on the Rocks (1987) and played the lead role in the premiere production, alongside Geoffrey Rush and Kerry Walker.

Gaden appears in the ABC legal comedy Fisk, where he plays retired Supreme Court Judge Anthony Fisk, father of Kitty Flanagan's character, Helen Tudor-Fisk.

== Awards ==
John Gaden was appointed a Member of the Order of Australia (AM) in the 1986 Australia Day Honours for his services to the performing arts. He was appointed an Officer of the Order of Australia (AO) at the 2018 Australia Day Honours.

He was won two Helpmann Awards for Best Male Actor in a Play: in 2001, for Yasmina Reza's The Unexpected Man, and in 2007, for The Lost Echo. In 2005 he won a Helpmann Award for Best Male Actor in a Supporting Role in a Play for Michael Frayn's Democracy.

== Personal ==
He is divorced, and has a son and three grandchildren. He lives alone.

== Stage ==
=== As actor ===
Year	Title	Role	Type
1961	Twelfth Night		University of Sydney
1961	Serjeant Musgrave's Dance: an Un-historical Parable		University of Sydney
1962	Coriolanus		University of Sydney
1967	King Lear		Theatre 62
1967	Rattle of a Simple Man		Theatre 62
1967	Cabbages at the Cross Roads		Theatre 62
1968	The Pied Piper of Hamelin		Theatre 62
1968	On Approval		Theatre 62
1968	The Anniversary / Poor Bitos		Theatre 62 for Adelaide Festival of the Arts
1968	Green Julia		Theatre 62
1968	The Father		Adelaide Teachers College Theatre
1968	Burke's Company		Adelaide Teachers College Theatre with State Theatre Company of South Australia & Australian Elizabethan Theatre Trust
1969	The Rope Dancers	Lameshnik	St Martins Theatre, Melbourne
1969	Out of the Crocodile		St Martins Theatre, Melbourne
1969	Have You Any Dirty Washing Mother Dear?		St Martins Theatre, Melbourne
1970	The Haunted House	Theopropides	Octagon Theatre
1970	Black Comedy	Harold Gorringe	Octagon Theatre
1970	Twelfth Night	Feste	Octagon Theatre
1970	Othello	Iago	Octagon Theatre
1970	The Crucible		Old Tote Theatre Company
1970	Brecht on Brecht		The Old Dolphin Theatre
1970	The Seagull		Octagon Theatre
1970	Hadrian the Seventh		Octagon Theatre
1970	Narrow Road to the Deep North		The Old Dolphin Theatre
1970	The Voice of the Explorer		Octagon Theatre
1970	The Voice of God		St George's Cathedral, Perth
1970	The Voices of Reason and Romance		Octagon Theatre
1970	Children's Day	Tom Sutton (Emma's solicitor)	St Martin's Theatre, Melbourne
1971	Hoddel's Remarkable Handcart		University of NSW
1971	King Oedipus	Leader of the Chorus	Princess Theatre Melbourne, Octagon Theatre & University of Adelaide
1971	Flash Jim Vaux	James Hardy Vaux (Flash Jim)	Nimrod Theatre Company
1971-72	The Man who Shot the Albatross		Princess Theatre Melbourne, Canberra Theatre, Her Majesty's Theatre, Adelaide & Elizabethan Theatre
1971	The Trial of the Catonsville Nine		Russell Street Theatre
1972	Uncle Vanya		University of NSW
1972	How Could You Believe Me When I Said I'd Be Your Valet When You Know I've Been a Liar All My Life?		Canberra Theatre with Old Tote Theatre Company
1973	Arsenic and Old Lace		University of NSW
1973	King Richard The Second	Richard II	Sydney Opera House
1973	What If You Died Tomorrow?		Sydney Opera House
1974	Love for Love		Sydney Opera House
1974	The Cradle of Hercules		Sydney Opera House with Old Tote Theatre Company
1975	You Want It Don't You Billy?		Nimrod Theatre Company
1975	Peer Gynt		Sydney Opera House
1975	Singles		Nimrod Theatre Company
1976	Travesties	Henry Carr	Nimrod Theatre Company
1976	A Handful of Friends		Playhouse, Adelaide
1976	Never the Twain		Playhouse, Adelaide
1976	The Recruiting Officer	Captain Plume	Nimrod Theatre Company
1976	The Duchess of Malfi	Ferdinand	Nimrod Theatre Company
1976-77	Dirty Linen	Cocklebury-Smythe MP	Nimrod Theatre Company
1977	Young Mo	Mr Sluice / Stiffy	Nimrod Theatre Company
1977	Travesties	Henry Carr	Nimrod Theatre Company
1977	Ashes	Colin Harding	Nimrod Theatre Company
1978	Oedipus the King / Oedipus at Colonus	Creon	Playhouse, Adelaide
1978	Three O'Clock Farewell		Playhouse Adelaide
1978-79	Kold Komfort Kaffee	Actor / singer	Nimrod Theatre Company & Space Theatre, Adelaide
1978	Pandora's Cross	Mac Greene	Paris Theatre, Sydney
1978	Visions	President Lopez of Paraguay	Paris Theatre, Sydney
1978	Jumpers	Professor George Moore	Nimrod Theatre Company
1979	Life of Galileo	Galileo Galilei	Nimrod Theatre Company
1980	The Sunny South	Dick Duggan	Sydney Opera House
1980	Close of Play	Benedict	Sydney Opera House & Theatre Royal, Sydney
1980	The Two Gentlemen of Verona	Silvia / Speed / Sir Eglamour	Seymour Centre
1980	Measure for Measure	Escalus / Abhorson	Seymour Centre
1981	The Man from Mukinupin	Cecil Brunner / Max Montebello	Sydney Opera House
1981	Hamlet	Ghost / Player King	Sydney Opera House with Sydney Theatre Company
1981	Innocent Bystanders		Stables Theatre
1982	Amadeus	Antonio Salieri	Theatre Royal, Sydney with Sydney Theatre Company
1983	Mostly Mozart - Australian Chamber Orchestra	Narrator	Sydney Opera House
1983	The Way of the World		Sydney Opera House with Sydney Theatre Company
1984	The Pillars of Society	Karsten Bernick	Sydney Opera House
1985	Signal Driver	Theo	Belvoir Theatre Company
1985	The Resistible Rise of Arturo Ui		Seymour Centre
1986	Dreams in an Empty City	Wilson	Playhouse, Adelaide with State Theatre Company of South Australia for Adelaide Festival of Arts
1986	The Real Thing	Henry	Playhouse, Adelaide with State Theatre Company of South Australia
1986	Wild Honey		Playhouse, Adelaide with State Theatre Company of South Australia
1987	Shepherd on the Rocks	Reverend Daniel Shepherd	Playhouse, Adelaide with State Theatre Company of South Australia
1987	The Winter's Tale	Leontes / Shepherd	Playhouse, Adelaide with State Theatre Company of South Australia
1988	1841		Playhouse, Adelaide with State Theatre Company of South Australia for Adelaide Festival of Arts & Sydney Opera House with Sydney Theatre Company
1988	King Lear	King Lear	Playhouse, Adelaide with State Theatre Company of South Australia
1988	A Dream Play	Lawyer	Sydney Opera House with Sydney Theatre Company for Festival of Sydney & Playhouse, Adelaide with State Theatre Company of South Australia
1990	The Tempest	Prospero	Playhouse, Melbourne with Melbourne Theatre Company
1989	Lost Weekend		Space Theatre, Adelaide with State Theatre Company of South Australia
1989	Hedda Gabler	Judge Brack	Playhouse, Adelaide with State Theatre Company of South Australia
1989	Ring Round the Moon		Playhouse, Adelaide with State Theatre Company of South Australia
1990	The Secret Rapture	Tom French	Sydney Opera House with Sydney Theatre Company
1990	Moby Dick	Ahab	Malthouse Theatre for Melbourne International Festival of the Arts
1990	Present Laughter	Garry Essendine	Playhouse, Melbourne with Melbourne Theatre Company
1991	Racing Demon	Reverend Lionel Espy	Playhouse, Melbourne with Melbourne Theatre Company
1991	Uncle Vanya	Vanya	Russell Street Theatre with Melbourne Theatre Company
1991	A Flea in Her Ear	Chandebise	Playhouse, Adelaide with State Theatre Company of South Australia
1991-92	Money and Friends	Peter	Suncorp Theatre, Brisbane, Sydney Opera House, Playhouse, Melbourne, Playhouse, Adelaide & Canberra Theatre with Queensland Theatre Company
1991-92	The Wizard of Oz - The Musical	Professor Chester Marvel / The Wizard / The Gatekeeper	State Theatre, Melbourne with RSC
1992-93	Death and the Maiden	Roberto Miranda	Wharf Theatre, Russell Street Theatre, Playhouse, Perth, Space Theatre, Adelaide & Sydney Opera House with Melbourne Theatre Company
1993	Coriolanus		Sydney Opera House with Sydney Theatre Company
1993	The Visit		Sydney Opera House with Sydney Theatre Company
1994	Furious		Space Theatre, Adelaide for Adelaide Festival of Arts, Malthouse Theatre & Sydney Theatre Company
1994	Hysteria, or Fragments of an Analysis of an Obsessional Mind	Sigmund Freud	Playhouse, Melbourne with Melbourne Theatre Company
1995	Sydney Stories 1: The Ninth Wonder / The Price of Prayer / The Last Days of a Famous Mime / Family Running for Mr. Whippy		Wharf Theatre with Sydney Theatre Company
1995	Picasso at the Lapin Agile		Belvoir Theatre Company
1995	Saint Joan		Sydney Opera House with Sydney Theatre Company
1995	Who's Afraid of Virginia Woolf?		Glen Street Theatre with Sydney Theatre Company
1995	Arcadia		Playhouse, Adelaide with State Theatre Company of South Australia, Sydney Opera House with Sydney Theatre Company, Theatre Royal, Hobart, Canberra Theatre & His Majesty's Theatre, Perth
1996	As You Like It	Wardrobe	Sydney Opera House with Sydney Theatre Company
1996-97	Who's Afraid of Virginia Woolf?		Queens Park Theatre, Perth, Bunbury Regional Entertainment Centre, Esperance Civic Centre, His Majesty's Theatre, Perth, Theatre Royal, Hobart, Burnie Arts and Function Centre, Princess Theatre, Launceston, Canberra Theatre & Sydney Opera House
1997	Ariadne auf Naxos		State Theatre, Melbourne & Sydney Opera House with Opera Australia for Sydney Festival
1997	A Hard God		Playhouse, Adelaide with State Theatre Company of South Australia
1998-2001	Cloudstreet	Lester Lamb	Berth 9, Darling Harbour, Playhouse, Adelaide & Malthouse Theatre, Theatre Royal, Sydney, Playhouse, QPAC, Olivier Theatre, London & Harvey Lichtenstein Theater, New York with Company B Belvoir / Black Swan Theatre
1998	Henry IV	Falstaff	Sydney Opera House, Canberra Theatre, Malthouse Theatre, Theatre Royal, Hobart, Monash University, His Majesty's Theatre, Perth & Sydney Opera House with Bell Shakespeare
1998	Love for Love		Sydney Opera House with Sydney Theatre Company
2000	The White Devil	Cardinal Monticelso	Theatre Royal, Sydney with Sydney Theatre Company
2000	The Unexpected Man	Persky	Belvoir Theatre Company & Fairfax Studio, Melbourne
2001	No Man's Land	Spooner / Hirst	Queensland Theatre Company & Sydney Theatre Company
2002-04	Copenhagen	Niels Bohr	Wharf Theatre, Athenaeum Theatre, Glen Street Theatre, Monash University, Playhouse Canberra & Playhouse, QPAC with Sydney Theatre Company
2003	Waiting for Godot	Vladimir	Belvoir Theatre Company
2003	Major Barbara	Andrew Undershaft	Parade Theatre with Sydney Theatre Company
2003	The Fever		Belvoir Theatre Company
2004	Victory: Choices in Reaction	Scrope	Wharf Theatre with Sydney Theatre Company
2004	The Miser	Harpagon (The Miser)	Sydney Opera House
2005	Democracy		Sydney Theatre Company
2006	The Lost Echo	Tiresias	Sydney Theatre Company
2005	Stuff Happens	Jack Straw (British foreign minister)	Seymour Centre & Comedy Theatre, Melbourne
2005	The Cherry Orchard	Gaev	Wharf Theatre with Sydney Theatre Company
2006	Mother Courage and Her Children		Wharf Theatre with Sydney Theatre Company
2006	The Bourgeois Gentleman	Philosophy Tutor	Sydney Theatre Company
2007-08	The Season at Sarsaparilla	Clive Pogson	Sydney Opera House & Playhouse, Melbourne with Sydney Theatre Company
2007	The Art of War	Patterson Blake / Emmett / Chorus	Wharf Theatre with Sydney Theatre Company
2007	A Midsummer Night's Dream	Starveling / Peaseblossom	Sydney Theatre Company
2007	Tales from the Vienna Woods	Leopold	Sydney Opera House with Sydney Theatre Company
2008	The Serpent's Teeth: Citizens	Rasid	Sydney Opera House with Sydney Theatre Company
2009	The War of the Roses	Sir John Falstaff / John of Gaunt / Edmund, Duke of York	His Majesty's Theatre, Perth & STC
2009	Pericles	Gower (Narrator) & others	Sydney Opera House & Playhouse, Melbourne
2009	King Lear	Lear	Dunstan Playhouse
2010	The Trial	Priest &.Herr Huld	Subiaco Arts Centre, Malthouse Theatre & Wharf Theatre with Sydney Theatre Company & ThinIce
2011-12	The Wild Duck	Håkon Werle (Greger's father)	Belvoir Theatre Company, Malthouse Theatre & National Theatre, Oslo
2011	The Seagull	Pyotr Nikolayevich Sorin	Belvoir Theatre Company
2011	No Man's Land	Hirst	Bille Brown Theatre with Queensland Theatre & Sydney Opera House with Sydney Theatre Company
2012	Face to Face	Uncle	Sydney Theatre Company
2013	Other Desert Cities	Lyman Wyeth	Southbank Theatre with Melbourne Theatre Company
2013	Rosencrantz and Guildenstern Are Dead	Polonius	Sydney Theatre
2013	Hamlet	Claudius	Belvoir Theatre Company
2013-14	The Wild Duck	Håkon Werle (Greger's father)	MuseumsQuartier, Vienna, Muziekgebouw aan 't IJ, Amsterdam, Barbican Theatre, London & Heath Ledger Theatre
2015	Seventeen	Mike	Belvoir Theatre Company
2015	Orlando	Elizabeth / Chorus	Sydney Opera House with Sydney Theatre Company
2016	Straight White Men	Ed	Fairfax Studio with Melbourne Theatre Company
2016	The Hansard Monologues: Age of Entitlement	Malcolm Turnbull	Glen Street Theatre, Seymour Centre, Bruce Illawarra Performing Arts Centre & Old Parliament House, Canberra
2016	A Life in the Theatre	Robert	Eternity Playhouse with Darlinghurst Theatre Company
2017	2071	Professor Chris Rapley	Seymour Centre with Australian Theatre for Young People
2017	The Rasputin Affair	Vlad	Ensemble Theatre
2018	Saint Joan	inquisitor / Archbishop	Roslyn Packer Theatre with Sydney Theatre Company
2018-19	Diplomacy	Raoul Nordling	Ensemble Theatre
2019	Packer & Sons	Rupert Murdoch	Belvoir Street Theatre
2023	Do Not Go Gentle	Oates	Roslyn Packer Theatre with Sydney Theatre Company
2023	Mr Bailey's Minder	Leo Bailey	Ensemble Theatre

Source: AusStage

=== As crew ===
Year	Title	Role	Type
1980	The Ballad of Billy Lane	Director	Stables Theatre with Sydney Theatre Company
1981	Rare Words - Brave Deeds	Playwright / Director	Sydney Opera House with Sydney Theatre Company
1981	No End of Blame	Director	Playhouse, Adelaide with State Theatre Company of South Australia
1981	Innocent Bystanders	Director	Stables Theatre with Sydney Theatre Company
1982	The Conquest of Carmen Miranda	Director	Sydney Theatre Company
1983	The Portage to San Cristobal	Director	Sydney Opera House with Sydney Theatre Company
1983-85	The Life and Adventures of Nicholas Nickleby	Co-director	Theatre Royal, Sydney, State Theatre, Melbourne & Festival Theatre, Adelaide with Sydney Theatre Company
1984	The Conquest of Carmen Miranda	Director	Sydney Opera House with Sydney Theatre Company
1985	The 1985 Scandals	Director	Belvoir Theatre Company & Universal Theatre
1986	Pravda	Director	Playhouse, Adelaide with State Theatre Company of South Australia
1987	After Magritte	Director	Playhouse, Adelaide with State Theatre Company of South Australia
1987	Much Ado About Nothing	Director	Playhouse, Adelaide with State Theatre Company of South Australia
1987	Les Liaisons Dangereuses	Director	Playhouse, Adelaide with State Theatre Company of South Australia
1988	1841	Co-director	Playhouse, Adelaide with State Theatre Company of South Australia for Adelaide Festival of Arts & Sydney Opera House with Sydney Theatre Company
1988	Rough Crossing	Director	Sydney Opera House, Playhouse, Canberra, Playhouse, Adelaide with State Theatre Company of South Australia & Gary Penny Productions
1989	The Tempest	Director	Playhouse, Adelaide with State Theatre Company of South Australia
2022	The Tenant of Wildfell Hall	Dance Choreographer	Roslyn Packer Theatre with Sydney Theatre Company

== Filmography ==
=== Film ===
Year	Title	Role	Notes
2023	The Appleton Ladies' Potato Race	Dr Holliday	Featured film
2016	The Death and Life of Otto Bloom	Charles Reiner	Mockumentary film
2011	The Eye of the Storm	Arnold Wyburd	Feature film
2004	Right Here Right Now	Judge Doyle	
2003	Excursion	Narrator	Short film
2001	WillFull	Bill	Feature film
1998	A Little Bit of Soul	Dr. Sommerville	Feature film
1997	Thank God He Met Lizzie	Dr O'Hara	Feature film
1996	Children of the Revolution	Professor C.W. Wilke	Feature film
1995	Mushrooms	Reverend Braningan	
1995	Dad and Dave: On Our Selection	Reverend McFarlane	Feature film
1994	Muriel's Wedding	Doctor	Feature film
1984	Conferenceville	Ian Selfridge	TV movie
1980	Big Toys	Ritchie	TV movie
1978	The Tichborne Affair		TV movie
1977	The FJ Holden	Waiter	Feature film
1976	Mad Dog Morgan	Extra	Feature film
1976	Caddie	Solicitor	Feature film
1976	God Knows Why, But It Works	Defence Counsel	
1975	I'm Here, Darlings!		TV movie
1973	The Affray at Fogg's Humpy	Frank Gardiner	Short film
1973	The Taming of the Shrew		TV movie

=== Television ===
Year	Title	Role	Notes
2022	Bump	Kenny	2 episodes
2021–present	Fisk	Anthony Fisk	7 episodes
2022	Significant Others	Pastor	1 episode
2020	Operation Buffalo	Swanny	3 episodes
2010–18	Rake	Governor General	2 episodes
2013	A Place to Call Home	Dr. Stewart	1 episode
2012	Underbelly	Merv Grogan	2 episodes
1994	Halifax f.p.	Toser's Solicitor	1 episode
1985	Mother and Son	Funeral Assistant	1 episode
1980	Players in the Gallery		TV miniseries
1979	A Place in the World	Warwick Lacey	TV miniseries, 1 episode
1977	Beyond Reasonable Doubt	Defence	1 episode
1976	Luke's Kingdom	D'arcy	1 episode
1975	The Explorers	Performer	1 episode
1975	Homicide	George McKenna	1 episode
1975	Matlock Police	Walter Anderson	1 episode
1975	Behind the Legend	S.T. Gill	1 episode
1974	Flash Nick from Jindavick	Sergeant Carson	1 episode
1968	Contrabandits	Crowe	1 episode

== Audiobooks ==
Year	Title	Role
	Fireman Sam	Narrator
	Magic Mountain	Narrator
