= Jennifer Hagan =

Australian actress

- Born: Perth, Western Australia
- Education: Loreto Convent Perth; National Institute of Dramatic Art
- Occupations: Actress; Director; Acting tutor
- Years active: 1963–2020
- Spouse: Ron Blair (m. 1989)

Jennifer Hagan is an Australian actress. She is known for her work on stage, and taught acting at NIDA for six years in the 1990s.

== Early life and education ==
Jennifer Hagan was educated at the Loreto Convent, Claremont, and graduated from the National Institute of Dramatic Art in 1963.

== Career ==
For three decades Hagan was a leading player with professional theatre companies throughout Australia, notably for the Old Tote Theatre Company and Sydney Theatre Company.

Early in her career, she played the lead in Ibsen's Hedda Gabler and Berline in Molière's The Imaginary Invalid at the Old Tote. With the Sydney Theatre Company she made her mark in several of Luigi Pirandello's plays.

As a contract player in the 1970s with the Melbourne Theatre Company, Hagan was seen in a wide range of roles including Yvette in Brecht's Mother Courage, Ilona Szabo in Molnar's The Play's the Thing, Jennifer Dubedat in Shaw's The Doctor's Dilemma, Beatrice in Shakespeare's Much Ado About Nothing, and Electra in Sophocles' Electra.

In 1979 she created the role of Helen in David Williamson's Travelling North for Sydney's Nimrod Theatre. In 1981 she played Madge in Ronald Harwood's The Dresser with Gordon Chater and Warren Mitchell. Also that year Hagan was part of a theatre group named "A Shakespeare Company" under the direction of Rex Cramphorn who produced Measure for Measure and The Two Gentlemen of Verona at the Seymour Centre. The plays were produced using a "limited life" grant awarded by the Australia Council and the cast included Ron Haddrick, Ruth Cracknell, John Gaden, Drew Forsythe and Arthur Dignam.

Thereafter, Hagan performed in the classical and modern repertoire until she was appointed the acting tutor at NIDA in Sydney. She taught acting at the National Institute of Dramatic Art in Sydney from 1991 until 1997.

Hagan retired in 2020.

She returned to the stage to play Vita Sackville-West in Vita and Virginia with Ruth Cracknell at the Sydney Opera House in 1997 followed by a national tour. Hagan appeared occasionally on television The Restless Years and in films such as For Love Alone (1986) and Mad Max: Fury Road (2015) but mainly divided her time between the theatre, teaching and directing.

Hagan directed her husband Ron Blair's play President Wilson in Paris at the Riverside Theatre in Parramatta in 2005.

== Personal life ==
In 1989, Hagan married the Australian playwright Ron Blair.
