= The Taming of the Shrew (1973 film) =

1973 Australian TV play by Robin Lovejoy

- Based on: The Taming of the Shrew by William Shakespeare
- Directed by: Robin Lovejoy; Donald Zweck
- Starring: John Bell; Carole McCready; Ron Haddrick; John Gaden; Melissa Jaffer
- Country of origin: Australia
- Original language: English

Production
- Running time: 120 mins
- Production company: ABC

Original release
- Network: ABC
- Release: 25 January 1973 (Sydney)
- Release: 6 March 1973 (Melbourne)

The Taming of the Shrew is a 1973 Australian TV screening of the Old Tote production of the play by William Shakespeare, relocated to an unnamed town in New South Wales at the turn of the twentieth century.

== Cast ==
- John Bell as Petruchio
- Carole McCready as Bianca
- Ron Haddrick as Baptista
- John Gaden
- Melissa Jaffer as Widow
- Martin Vaughan
- Robyn Nevin as Barmaid
- Tom Farley
- Gil Tucker
- Edmund Falzon
- Michael Rolfe
- John Walton
- Drew Forsythe

== Production ==
The ABC announced it in January 1973. It was one of several stage productions recreated by the ABC for television including Hamlet.

== Reception ==
The Age wrote "why Taming had to be cheekily rewritten and rendered down into ill-tasting Strinespeare escaped this critic's understanding."
