= Robin Lovejoy =

Director, actor & designer (1924–1985)

Robin Lovejoy OBE
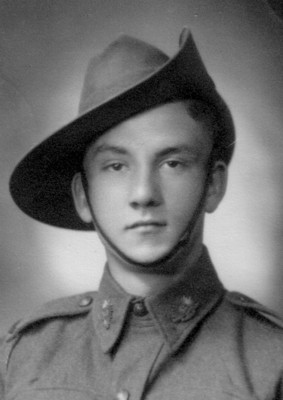
- Robin Lovejoy, during his brief military service
- Born: Robin Casper Lovejoy; 17 December 1924; Labasa, Fiji
- Died: 14 December 1985 (aged 60); Mosman, New South Wales, Australia
- Occupations: Director; actor; designer
- Years active: 1950–1985
- Children: 2

Robin Casper Lovejoy, OBE (17 December 1924 – 14 December 1985) was an Australian director, actor, and designer best known for his work on television and in theatre. He was one of Australia's leading theatre directors of the 1960s and 1970s and significantly influenced the Australian drama and theatre stage.

== Early life ==
Lovejoy was born on 17 December 1924 in Labasa, Fiji. His father, Casper Ebenezer Lovejoy (1886–1971) had English and Irish ancestry, and his mother Viti Clarke (1887–1951) had predominantly Scottish ancestry. During his younger years, he spent time at Suva Boys Grammar School, until his whole family moved from Fiji to Sydney, Australia in 1939. Shortly after, he began to work as an accountant. In 1942, he volunteered for the Australian Imperial Army and was stationed in the Torres Strait. It was at this time as a soldier that Lovejoy began to play readings of stories and plays to entertain his fellow troops. He was discharged from the army in 1946 and continued to study interior design.

== Career ==
In the period he was studying interior design, Robin joined the cast of May Hollinworth's Metropolitan Players, as a repertory actor. With this experience, he went on to star in numerous plays, most famously in Douglas Stewart's Shipwreck. With years of acting and experience in theatre, Lovejoy became a costume designer for the National Theatre Ballet Company. In his début, he created almost fifty costumes, masks, and accessories for the company.

When Hollinworth withdrew from the Players due to health issues in 1950, Lovejoy began his directorial début as the new director of the play. In 1952, he directed a new and final play for the company, The House of Bernarda Alba, and was met with high praise. In 1953 he joined the New South Wales Opera Company but resigned after five productions. In 1955 Lovejoy joined the Australian Elizabethan Theatre Trust, winning many awards for costume design for The Rivals in 1957.

In 1963 he directed episodes of the television series Adventure Unlimited.

In 1964, after nine years of working in the AETT, Lovejoy took charge of the development of Australian plays, and he was employed by the Old Tote Theatre Company in Sydney, as a director. He was continuously credited for creating some of the 'best professional drama in Australia'. In 1973 he directed the Old Tote's production of Richard II, as well as the premiere of David Williamson’s play What If You Died Tomorrow? The following year, when he took the play to London, it was the first professional Australian production staged there since the Summer of the Seventeenth Doll in 1957. In 1974, for his continuous contribution to the arts, he was appointed an Officer of the Order of the British Empire. For the rest of his professional life, he worked for the Victorian State Opera and the Queensland Theatre Company, mostly serving as a director.

== Personal life ==
On 14 January 1957, Lovejoy married Patricia Hughes and had two children with her, Kate in 1958, and Amanda in 1959.

== Illness and death ==
During his time at the Queensland Theatre Company, Lovejoy was diagnosed with liver cancer. He died of the illness on 14 December 1985 in his home at Mosman, New South Wales and was cremated.

== Legacy ==
After his death, many famous figures remembered Lovejoy. The actor Leonard Teale recalled 'He was a man concerned with the pursuit of excellence'; he 'had no time for mediocrity'. Frank van Straten considered that 'Lovejoy was a genius of the theatre . . . demanding, fiery, often impatient and tyrannical ... [but] he could be angelically patient, coaxing magic from [the] unplumbed depths of an actor’s art'.

== Filmography ==
Feature films and television
Year	Title	Role	Notes
1965	Adventure Unlimited	—N/a	Directed 5 episodes
1973	The Taming of the Shrew (1973)	—N/a	TV film; director
1984	My First Wife	John's father	Film
