= Trevor Kent =

Australian actor (1940–1989)

- Born: 24 April 1940; Queensland, Australia
- Died: 4 November 1989 (aged 49); Melbourne, Australia
- Occupation(s): Television and theatre actor

Trevor Kent (24 April 1940 – 4 November 1989) was an Australian actor, director, playwright, and singer.

== Early life and education ==
Trevor Kent was born on 24 April 1940.

Kent initially worked as a primary-school teacher, teaching for three years in Nambour and Buderim in Queensland while acting in amateur theatre groups.

He moved to Sydney to train as an actor with the Independent Drama School in the early 1960s, supporting himself during this time with teaching.

== Career ==
After training, he worked as an actor, director, playwright, and singer.

In Sydney, he understudied the role of Rolfe in the Tivoli Theatre's production of The Sound of Music, and acted in Becket and Oh Dad, Poor Dad, Mamma's Hung You in the Closet and I'm Feelin' So Sad with the Independent.

After two years in Sydney, he emigrated to the UK and spent ten years there. In the UK, Kent worked with director Bil Keating and later with the Royal Shakespeare Company.

On returning to Sydney in 1974, Kent played Frank'N'Furter in a stage production of The Rocky Horror Show.

Several appearances on Australian television followed, including roles in Rush, The Sullivans, Cop Shop and Carson's Law. He moved to Melbourne in 1984, and in 1984–1985, appeared in television soap opera Prisoner as the villainous Frank Burke for several months.

== Death ==
Kent, who was gay, learned he was HIV positive in the mid-1980s and at that time volunteered as a carer for people living with HIV and AIDS. He was public about his HIV status and directed two theatre productions for Out Theatre Company that addressed HIV and AIDS. One of these, Unnatural Acts, toured pubs, theatres, and colleges in Melbourne and Sydney.

Kent continued to work with the theatre group until a few weeks before his death in 1989 as a result of HIV. His final acting appearance was a scene with Meryl Streep in the film A Cry in the Dark (1988).

He died on 4 November 1989.

== Filmography ==
=== Film ===
Year	Title	Role	Notes
1977	Straight Enough		TV movie
1988	Evil Angels (aka A Cry in the Dark)	Bomb Scare Policeman	Feature film

=== Television ===
Year	Title	Role	Notes
1969	Theatre Date	Giles Cadwallader	TV series, 1 episode: "The Man Most Likely to ..."
1971	Scene	Shop assistant	TV series documentary, 1 episode: "Mates"
1971	BBC Play of the Month	Yakov, servant	TV series, 1 episode: "Platonov"
1976	The Sullivans	Allister McConnell	TV series, 1 episode
1976	Rush	Vinnie	TV series, 1 episode: "McKellar R.I.P."
1978	Case for the Defence	The Rabbi	TV series, 1 episode: "The Man Who Died Twice"
1981	Sporting Chance	Eddie	TV series, 1 episode: "Eating Dirt"
1981–83	Cop Shop	Frank Gilmore	TV series, 3 episodes: "Episode #1.281", "Episode #1.282" and "Episode #1.500"
1982	Der schwarze Bumerang	Richard Duffy	TV miniseries, 4 episodes
1983 / 1984	Carson's Law	George Royston / Simpkins	TV series, 7 episodes
1984	Special Squad	Doggy Barker	TV series, 1 episode: "Easy Street"
1984–85	Prisoner	Frank Burke	TV series, 33 episodes
1985	Colour in the Creek	Brother Paul	TV series, 2 episodes: "Return to Coorumbong Creek" & "Gold Fever"

== Theatre ==
His plays and performances on stage include:

=== As actor ===
Year	Title	Role	Venue / company
1962	The Sound of Music	Rolfe	Tivoli Theatre, Sydney
1963	Oh Dad, Poor Dad, Mamma's Hung You in the Closet and I'm Feelin' So Sad		Independent Theatre
1964	Becket		Independent Theatre
1967	As You Like It		Royal Shakespeare Theatre, Aldwych Theatre, London, Ahmanson Theatre, Los Angeles with Royal Shakespeare Company
1967	The Relapse		Aldwych Theatre, London with Royal Shakespeare Company
1974	The Rocky Horror Show	Frank'N'Furter	New Art Cinema, Glebe
1974	The Chinese Prime Minister		Marian Street Theatre
1975	The Miser		UNSW Parade Theatre
1976	The Public Eye	Julian Crisoforou	Bankstown Town Hall, AMP Theatrette, Sydney
1977	Confusions: Mother Figure / Between Mouthfuls / Gosforth's Fete / A Talk in the Park	Terry / Martin / Stewart / Ernest	Marian Street Theatre
1977	The Lower Depths	Vassily Pepel	Sydney Opera House
1977	The Tempest	Adrian	Sydney Opera House
1978	Black Comedy	Harold Gorringe	Sydney Opera House
1978	Miss Julie	Jean	Sydney Opera House
1978	The Misanthrope	Acaste	Sydney Opera House
1978	King Lear	Edmund	Seymour Centre
1979	You Never Can Tell	Valentine	SGIO Theatre
1979	Breaker Morant	Captain Taylor	SGIO Theatre
1978	Hedda Gabler	Eilert Loevborg	SGIO Theatre
1979	Gone with Hardy	Stanley Jefferson	SGIO Theatre
1980	Bedroom Farce	Trevor	University of New England, Glen Innes Town Hall, Inverell Town Hall, Moree War Memorial Town Hall, Narrabri High School, Coonabarabran Shire Hall, Smithurst Theatre Gunnedah, Tamworth Town Hall
1980	Loot	Truscott	Playhouse, Perth
1981	Outside Edge	Bob	Marian Street Theatre
1981	Trap for a Lonely Man	Priest	Bondi Pavilion
1981	The Revenger's Tragedy	Ambitioso	Playhouse Adelaide
1986	Pommies	Forster	Russell Street Theatre
1986	Tom & Viv	Maurice	Russell Street Theatre
1986	The Dumb Waiter		Arena Theatre, Melbourne
1987	Two Dark Comedies of the Mind: The Flaw / Is This Where We Came In?		La Mama

=== As writer / director ===
Year	Title	Role	Venue / company
1988	Unnatural Acts	Director	Universal Theatre, Melbourne with Out Theatre Company
1990	No Thrills No Spills	Playwright	Footscray Community Arts Centre
