= Big Toys =

1977 Australian play by Patrick White

- Original language: English
- Written by: Patrick White
- Characters: Ritchie Bosanquet, a wealthy and successful lawyer Meg Bosanquet, socialite Terry Legge, a well-connected trade union leader based on Jack Mundey
- Subject: A satire on Sydney high society
- Genre: satire
- Setting: Sydney

Premiere
- Date: 27 July 1977
- Place: Parade Theatre, Kensington, Sydney

Big Toys is a 1977 Australian play by Patrick White. It was his first play in 14 years.

== Stage productions ==
The original production was by the Old Tote Theatre Company in Sydney. The cast was Max Cullen, Arthur Dignam and Kate Fitzpatrick and it was directed by Jim Sharman. The play was specifically written for the three lead actors.

== TV adaptation ==
It was adapted into a 1980 TV film by Patrick White. The film was part of the Australian Theatre Festival. The cast included Diane Cilento as Mag, Max Cullen as Terry, Colin Friels, and John Gaden as Ritchie.
