= Conference-ville =

- Based on: Conference-ville by Frank Moorhouse
- Written by: Frank Moorhouse
- Directed by: Julian Pringle
- Starring: John Gaden; Robyn Nevin; Ray Barrett
- Country of origin: Australia
- Original language: English

Production
- Producer: Sandra Levy
- Cinematography: Julian Penney
- Running time: 80 mins
- Production company: ABC

Original release
- Network: ABC
- Release: May 1984

Conference-ville is 1984 Australian TV movie based on a 1976 novel by Frank Moorhouse.

== Plot ==
Delegates attend a multi-racial UNESCO conference. Dr Cindy Broughton is raped by three Aboriginal delegates but refuses to press charges.

== Cast ==
- John Gaden as Ian Selfridge
- Robyn Nevin as Dr Cindy Broughton
- Ray Barrett
- Kevin Miles
- Robin Ramsay
- Mercia Deane-Johns
- John Frawley

== Reception ==
The Sydney Morning Herald said "it's not a bad production nor is it badly acted... fairly enjoyable. There is some funny lines parodying the jargon used by academics." Richard Coleman in his TV Extra column in the Sydney Morning Herald criticised the adaptation and wrote "subtleties of the book - an internal monologue of a liberal-lefty performing the rituals of a conference in the early Fraser years were thrown overboard for the juicier dramatic possibilities of rape." The Age's Dennis Pryor says "It was gripping television, full of surprise, impeccable in direction and casting. I cannot recall any other piece of Australian television drama with such a successful mixture of satire, melodrama and romance." Matthew Bolton in the Age's Green Guide begins his review "The television adaptation by Frank Moorhouse of his book Conference-ville must rate as one of the best pieces of Australian drama to grace our screens for some time. Brilliantly scripted, the program is entertaining, moving, intelligent and very Australian."
