= The Disappearance of Azaria Chamberlain =

- Written by: Frank Moorhouse
- Directed by: Judy Rymer
- Starring: John Hamblin; Elaine Hudson; Max Phipps
- Country of origin: Australia
- Original language: English

Production
- Producer: Errol Sullivan

Original release
- Network: Network 10
- Release: 1984

The Disappearance of Azaria Chamberlain is a 1983 Australian television docufilm about the Azaria Chamberlain case.

Executive producer Michael Thornhill later said that "I don't have strong opinions about it [the film]. There are quite a few cheats in it, but at least what it did do – I'm not emotionally close to it – was put the audience in the view of I, the Jury. It has an enormous following in northern Europe. I think [director] Judy [Rymer] did a terrific job. I think it was interesting but, again, it's not a personal project."

The film was also released on VHS as Who Killed Baby Azaria?.

== Cast ==
- Elaine Hudson as Lindy Chamberlain
- John Hamblin as Michael Chamberlain
- Max Phipps as Mr Baker QC
- Peter Carroll as Mr Phillips QC
- Sandy Gutman as Himself (as Austen Tayshus)
- John Clayton as Insoector Gilroy
- Vanessa Downing as Mrs Lowe
- Wayne Jarratt as David
- Ray Meagher as Mr Lowe
- Richard Meikle as Coroner Galvin
