= Doreen Warburton =

Australian theatre director and actress

Doreen Warburton OBE
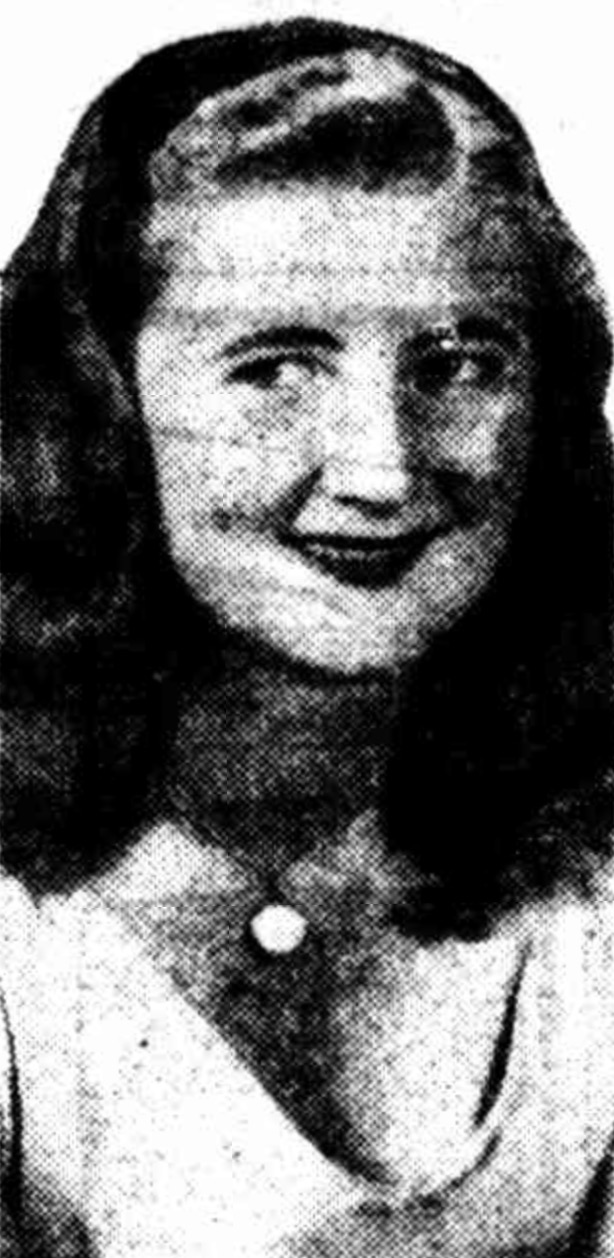
- Warburton in 1953
- Born: 22 March 1930; London, England
- Died: 19 July 2017 (aged 87); West Gosford, New South Wales, Australia
- Occupations: Actress; artistic director; theatre co-founder
- Years active: 1948-2006
- Employer: Q Theatre
- Spouse: Ben Gabriel

Evelyn Doreen Warburton OBE (22 March 1930 – 19 July 2017) also known as Evelyn Wardwas an English-born Australian actress, director, producer, singer and theatre co-founder.

== Biography ==
Evelyn Doreen Warburton was born in London, England on 22 March 1930. At 18 she began her theatre career with the Theatre Workshop, a company where all performers received equal pay and which toured, not just England but also to Scandinavia and Germany.

In 1953 she migrated to Australia to join her family, who had arrived in 1949 and seeking radio work. She made her Australian stage debut in The Shop at Sly Corner at the opening of the Apollo Theatre in Manly and then toured New South Wales in Love From a Stranger.

Warburton became a full-time actress in 1959 when she joined the Young Elizabethans and toured Australia for three years bringing Shakespeare's plays to school children.

With actors Ben Gabriel, Edward Hepple, Robert McDarra, Terry McDermott and Walter Sullivan, she was co-founder of the Q Theatre in 1963. Initially giving lunchtime performances at Circular Quay, the company also visited building sites and factories across Australia to bring theatre to the workers. In 1977 the company moved to a permanent venue in Penrith, opening with the musical Lock Up Your Daughters.

As artistic director, Warburton oversaw 81 productions for Q Theatre from 1977 until her retirement in 1989. In 1979 she was the first woman to direct a play at the Sydney Opera House.

Warburton was appointed an Officer of the Order of the British Empire in the 1979 Birthday Honours for service to theatre.

== Personal ==
Warburton married fellow actor Ben Gabriel in 1969, who predeceased her in 2012. She died at West Gosford on 19 July 2017.

== Selected filmography ==
- They're A Weird Mob, 1966
- Ned Kelly, 1970
- Nickel Queen, 1971
- Archer, 1985
- Wendy Cracked a Walnut, 1990

=== Television ===
- The Mike Walsh Show (1982) (TV series, 1 episode) Guest as herself.
