= Ronald Falk =

Australian actor (1935–2016)

- Born: Ronald William Thompson Falk; 23 August 1935; Geelong, Victoria, Australia
- Died: 27 June 2016 (aged 80)
- Occupations: Actor, production designer
- Known for: Voice of Dexter Jettster in *Star Wars: Episode II – Attack of the Clones*

Ronald "Ron" William Thompson Falk (born 23 August 1935 – 27 June 2016) was an Australian actor and production designer. He was perhaps best known as the voice of the Coruscant Diner chef, Dexter Jettster in Star Wars: Episode II – Attack of the Clones. His other works included roles in Jack Irish, Secret City, The Damnation of Harvey McHugh and ITV Play of the Week.

== Early life ==
Falk was born on 23 August 1935 in Geelong, Victoria, Australia. In his early years, he was educated at the Geelong Grammar School.

== Career ==
Falk's acting career began in Melbourne at the Union and National theatre. He played alongside the late Monica Maughan and Barry Humphries in The Front Page and other classical theatre roles.

He soon moved to England, where he spent ten years to participate in other theatre productions. He later moved back to Australia, where he continued his acting career well into his senior citizen years.

== Personal life ==
Falk took a two-year break from acting to take up painting and piano lessons. He learned to play the blues harmonica for the opera production of Mourning Becomes Electra.

== Death ==
Falk died on 27 June 2016 at the age of 80. His funeral was held on 15 July 2016. He is survived by his sister JJ Barwise, as well as his nephews, Ronald and Patrick, his niece, Ruby, and brother-in-law, Daniel.

== Filmography ==
Year	Title	Role	Notes
1979	The Little Convict	Pertwee	Voice
1982	Best Friends	Waiter	
1982	A Dangerous Summer	Clive Bennett	
1982	Lonely Hearts	Wig Salesman	
1984	My First Wife	Psychiatrist	
1988	Evil Angels	Pastor Olsen	
2002	Star Wars: Episode II – Attack of the Clones	Dexter Jettster	Voice
2010	Red Hill	Old Man	
2011	Codgers	Keith Fraser	
2015	Holding the Man	Old Digger in Car	
2012-16	Jack Irish	Norm	3 films and 7 episodes
