= Elaine Hudson =

Australian actress

- Occupation: Actress
- Notable work: Joh's Jury

Elaine Hudson is an Australian actress and director.

For her performance in Joh's Jury she was nominated for the 1993 AFI Award For Best Actress in a Leading Role in a Television Drama.

Other screen roles include playing Lindy Chamberlain in The Disappearance of Azaria Chamberlain. Her lengthy stage career includes directing and playing the title character The Lady From Dubuque (Belvoir Street Theatre, 1996) and playing the lead in Burnt Piano (Belvoir Street Theatre, 1999).

She also appeared as presenter in a 1981 episode of the Australian Children’s tv show Play School.
