= UNSW Venues =

There are several theatre and music venues at the University of New South Wales in Sydney, Australia.

== John Niland Scientia Building ==
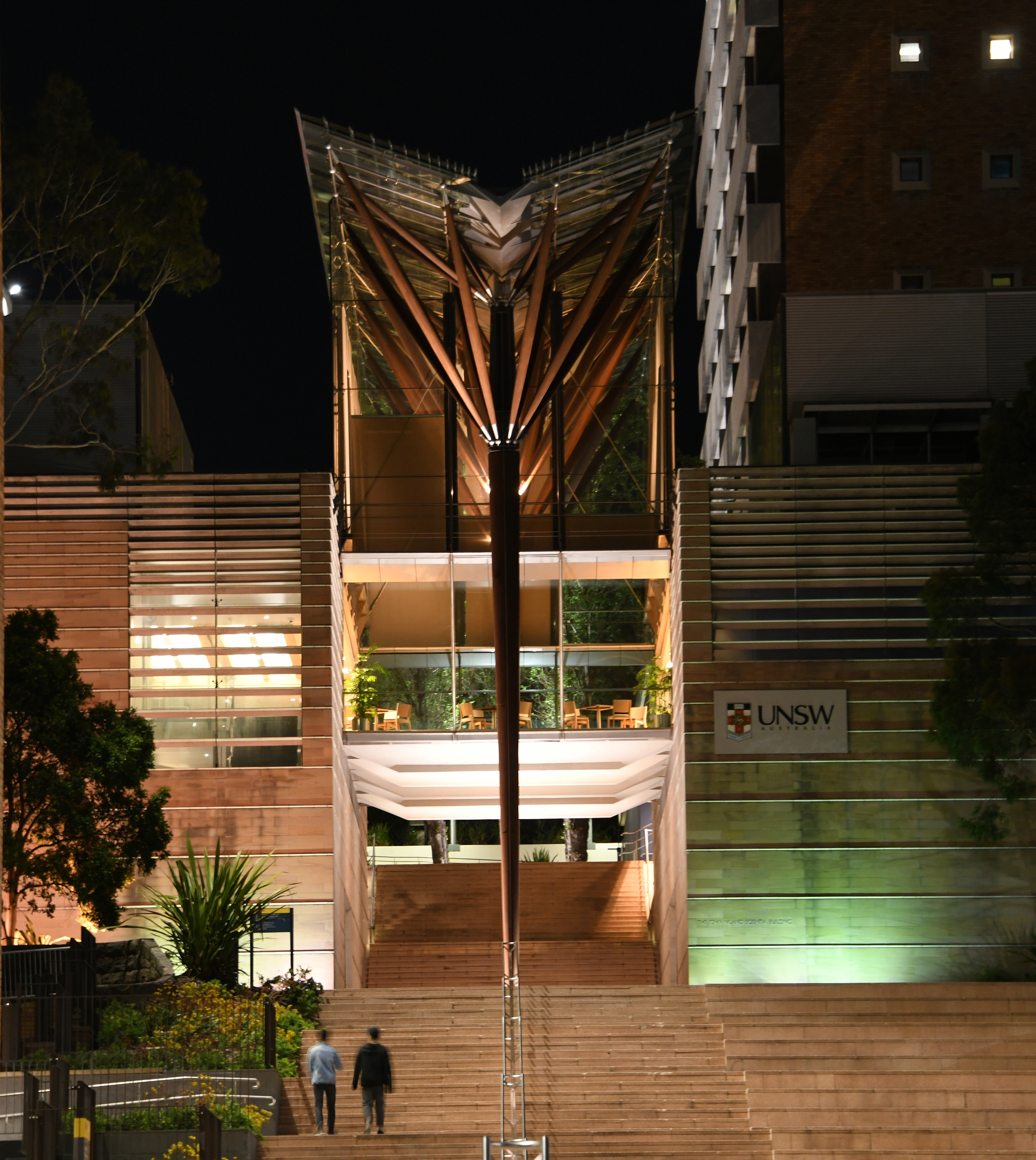
John Niland Scientia

Completed in 2000 and described as "the jewel in the University's crown", the John Niland Scientia Building is a multi-purpose space used principally for conferences and receptions, that was named after former Vice-Chancellor Professor John Niland in 2006.

The building's Leighton Hall has a capacity of around 400.

- Scientia Building venue information

== The Roundhouse ==
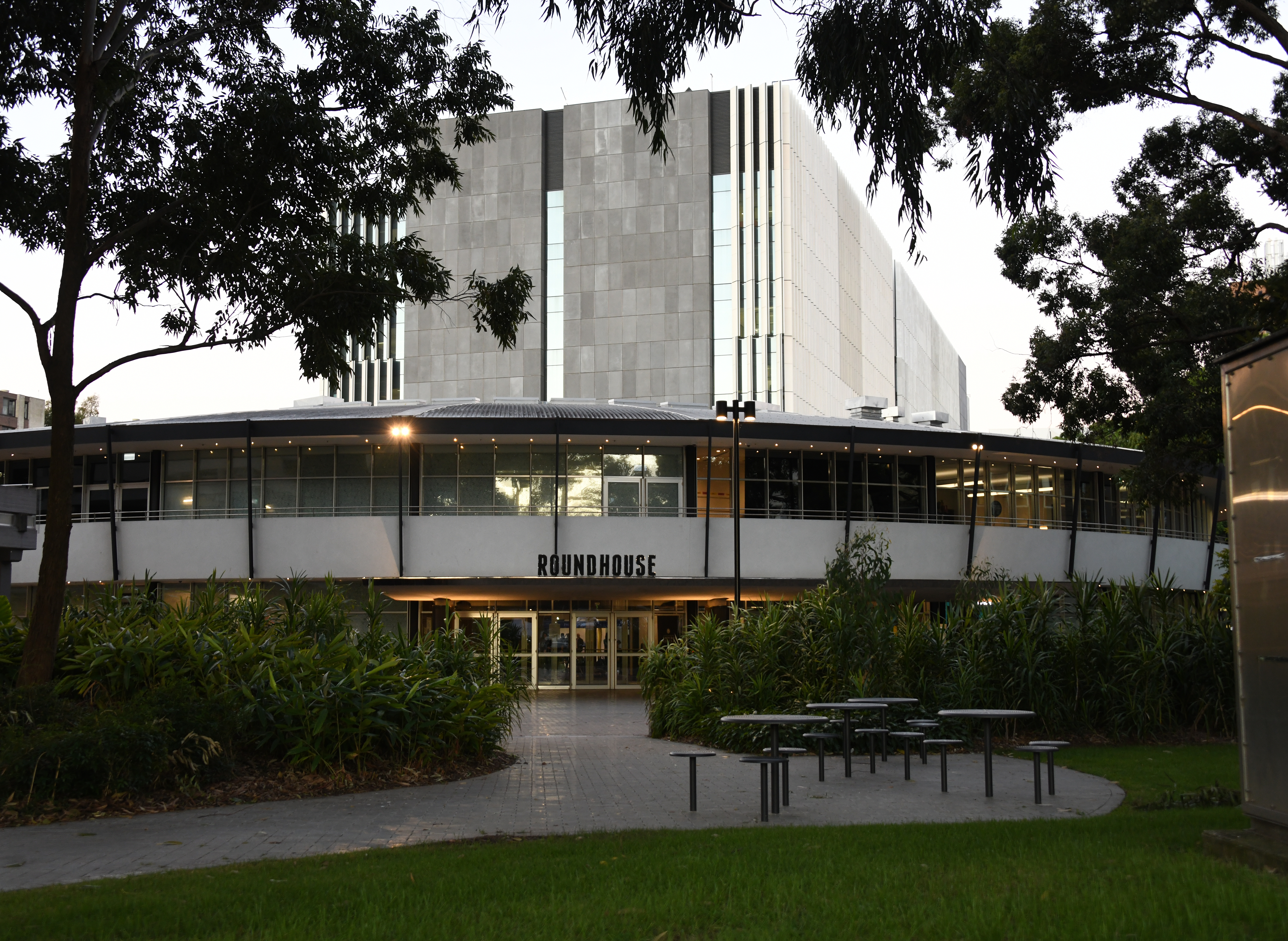
The Roundhouse

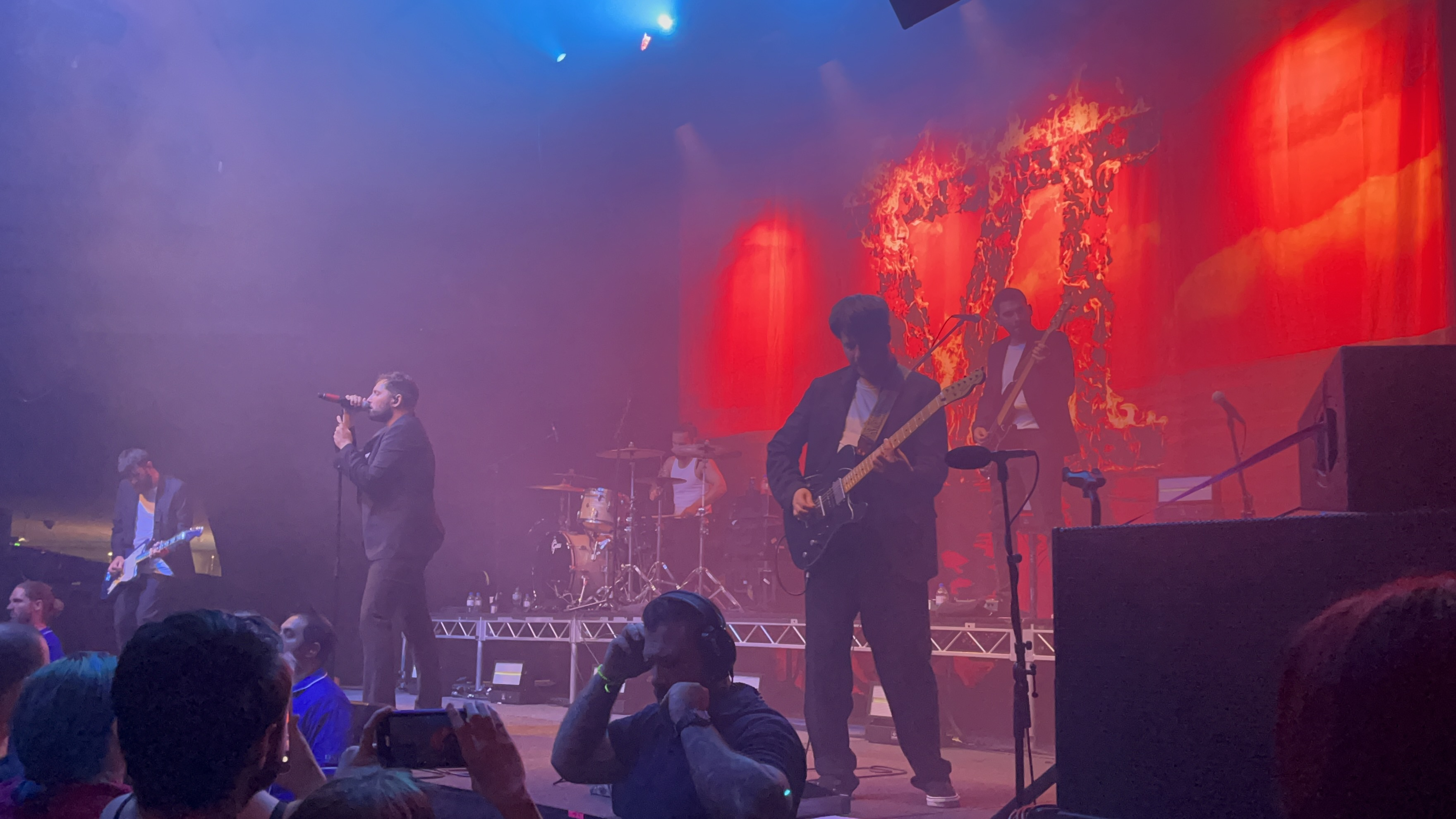
British rock band You Me at Six performing at the Roundhouse in July 2023.

The Roundhouse is an entertainment venue located on the University of New South Wales campus in Kensington, Australia. It is operated by the Arc. The Union Bar (or UniBar) is located on the ground floor of the Roundhouse, with a large round main auditorium in the centre and a series of food outlets (known as Eats @ the Round) located to the rear of the venue. Apart from regular university parties and sporting events, such as wrestling and Mixed martial arts, the venue holds concerts throughout the year hosting a wide variety of bands, some including The Dresden Dolls, Anthrax, Bullet for My Valentine, Meshuggah, Mudvayne, and many more.

The Roundhouse has a capacity of over 2000. The Roundhouse underwent an extensive refurbishment and was closed between June 2016 and March 2018.

- Roundhouse venue information

== Sir John Clancy Auditorium ==
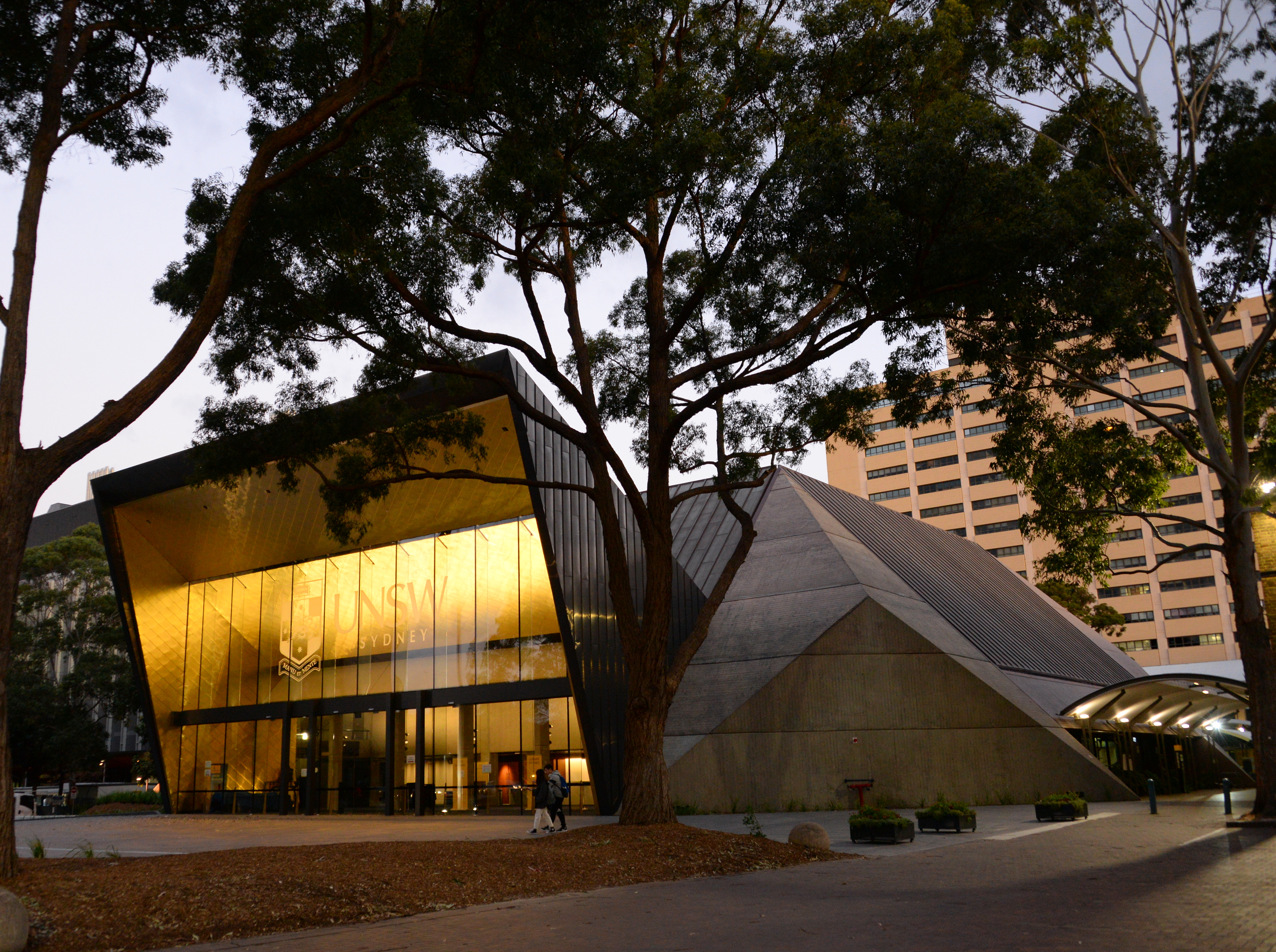
Sir John Clancy Auditorium

At 945 seats, the Sir John Clancy Auditorium is the eastern suburbs' largest public auditorium. It is named after former Chancellor of the university Sir John Sydney James Clancy. The building is used for lectures, graduation ceremonies and theatre and music performances.

- Clancy Auditorium venue information

== Science Theatre ==
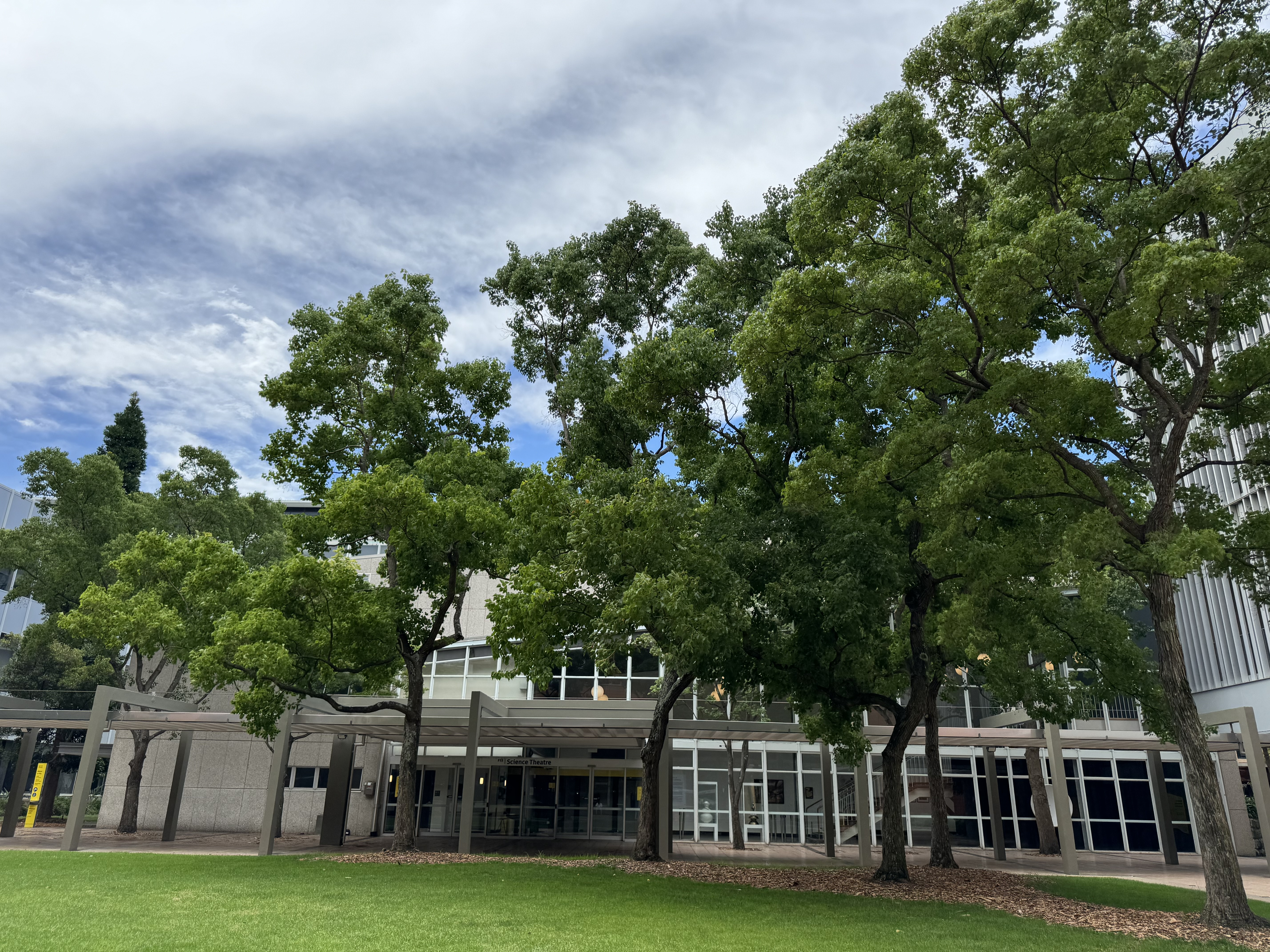
Science Theatre

The 826-seat Science Theatre is home to the university's two longest-running shows, the Law and Med Revues.

- Science Theatre venue information

== Io Myers Studio ==
Seating 124, the Io Myers Studio is the main performance and exhibition space of the university's School of English, Media & Performing Arts. Besides work coming from courses taught in the School, this much loved venue, is used by professional artists and companies for creative development work and occasionally by student theatre groups. Opened in 1982, it was named after Lady Io Myers.

- Io Myers Studio venue information

== Studio One ==
This black box space is managed by the School of English, Media & Performing Arts. Seating up to 70 people, Studio One besides being used for School performances and events is used by the New South Wales University Theatrical Society and Studio Four for student-produced shows throughout the year.

- Studio One venue information
- Studio One History
