= Wayne Jarratt =

Australian actor

- Born: Wayne Linden Jarratt; 19 April 1957
- Died: 14 May 1988 (aged 31); Wahroonga, New South Wales, Australia
- Occupations: Stage and television actor
- Years active: 1981–1988 (his death)
- Known for: Prisoner (71 episodes)

Wayne Linden Jarratt (19 April 1957 – 14 May 1988) was an Australian stage and television actor in the 1980s, remembered for his role in internationally renowned TV cult series Prisoner as friendly prison officer Steve Faulkner. He played the part for 71 episodes, as a supporting cast member first appearing in the penultimate episode of Season 3 (10 November 1981), but opted to leave the series to take a stage role. His final appearance was in Season 4, bowing out in Episode 316 (5 October 1982).

== Biography ==
Jarratt attended Balgowlah Boys High in Sydney from 1969 to 1974. He acted from the age of 11 and starred in various school plays. After leaving school, he had to choose between a career in acting or naval architecture. He chose acting and graduated from NIDA in 1977, before joining the South Australian Theatre Company for three years. He took on a number of stage roles, including Happy in Nimrod Theatre Company's production of Death of a Salesman in 1982. He had a small role in The Sullivans, before joining the cast of Prisoner as warder Steve Faulkner in February 1982. He took over from Gerard Maguire as the only other regular male cast member. Jarratt preferred small character roles, saying "I'm not after a constant spotlight. My main ambition is to make myself as versatile as possible."

After leaving Prisoner, Jarratt appeared in the Melbourne Theatre Company's production of Michael Gurr's A Pair of Claws. In February 1985, he played Bottom in Kim Carpenter's A Midsummer Night's Dream at The Nimrod, alongside Hugo Weaving and Angela Punch McGregor. He received praise from The Sydney Morning Herald's Mick Barnes, who said his performance was "beautifully played".

Jarratt died of a brain tumour at the age of 31 on 14 May 1988 in the Neringah Hospital, Wayn Wahroonga.

== Filmography ==
Year	Title	Role	Notes
1981	The Sullivans	Lieutenant Commander Larry Hartley	Episodes: 3 episodes
1981	Bellamy	David Dale	Episode: "Bet Your Life"
1981–1982	Prisoner	Steve Faulkner	71 episodes
1984	The Disappearance of Azaria Chamberlain	David – TV	Television film
1985	Anzacs	Pte. Charlie Upton	Episode: "The Big Push"
