= The End of the Beginning (play) =

1937 one-act play by Seán O'Casey

The End of the Beginning is a 1937 one-act play by Seán O'Casey.

It is a comedy set in rural Ireland. A couple argue about whether men's or women's work is more difficult, and swap places. The cast of only three (the couple plus the husband's friend) makes it suitable for some purposes e.g. entries in drama festivals.

== Setting ==
The Berrill's kitchen in a country house

== Genre ==
Farce or dramatic comedy

== Theme ==
The main idea of this play is gender biasness, the way men generally underestimate females and their capabilities

== Characters ==
Darry: A stubborn, fat man of about fifty-five. Often blames his wife for everything. Considers himself smarter and always right. Too sure of himself.

Lizzie: Wife of Darry, of about forty-five. A responsible and sensible woman about the house. Takes challenges seriously.

Barry: Darry's neighbour and partner in crime. Thin, easy going, near-sighted. More sensible than Darry, if not much.

== Summary ==
Darry and his wife have an argument about whether men's or women's work is more difficult and challenge each other by switching roles for a day. The wife immediately takes off towards the meadow to do Darry's part of the job, while Darry starts procrastinating by comically trying to do exercise in time with the directions given by the gramophone but fails to do so. On top of everything else, his good-for-nothing neighbour and partner in crime, Barry comes and joins him in his buffoonery. After a while, they funnily start practicing for their song which they are going to perform at the Town Hall Concert, "Down Where the Bees are Humming". When Darry realizes that he has wasted a lot of time, he starts getting down to business (that is household work). After a series of mishaps - broken crockery, bleeding nose, shattered windowpane, a fused light bulb, Barry's ruined spectacles, spilled oil from the oil drum and nearly getting pulled along with the tied heifer to the bank beside the house - Darry fails at doing housework (thus losing the challenge). All the while Lizzie is heard mowing the meadow. At the end of the play, Lizzie comes back home;successful in her task. The house is a wreck and even then Darry blames her for his situation.
