= What If You Died Tomorrow? =

Play written by David Williamson

- Original language: English
- Written by: David Williamson

Premiere
- Date: 27 September 1973
- Place: Old Tote, Sydney Opera House

What If You Died Tomorrow? is a 1973 play written by David Williamson. It was commissioned by the Old Tote Theatre Company for its first drama season at the new Sydney Opera House.

== Background ==
The play has a number of autobiographical elements, being about a doctor turned novelist and journalist who have left their respective spouses to live in an artists colony. David Williamson was an engineer turned playwright who lived in an artists colony in Eltham with wife Kristin after both left their respective spouses. Williamson's parents claimed the characters of the parents were based on them. It was Williamson's first play to deal with inter-generational conflicts on stage.

The original production was designed by Yoshi Tosa and directed by Robin Lovejoy.

== Productions outside Australia ==
The Old Tote production was performed in England in September 1974, making it the first full Australian production to have played in London since Summer of the Seventeenth Doll.

== Proposed Film Adaptation ==
In 1974 it was reported Williamson had written a screenplay version.

== Characters ==
On-stage:

Andrew Collins, a doctor turned writer ... Shane Porteous
Kirsty, a journalist, his lover ... Kirrily Nolan
Harry Bustle, Andrew's publisher ... Max Phipps
Michael O'Hearn, Andrew's agent, gay ... Ron Falk
Carmel Scott, publishing editor at Chisholms, a competitor of Bustle, and Michael's friend ... Dinah Shearing
Gunter (Graeme), Norwegian travelling with Ken and Irene after his fiancée left him, 21, all three returning from a cruise ... John Walton
Irene Collins, Andrew's mother, has dyspareunia ... Ruth Cracknell
Ken Collins, an insurance salesman, Andrew's father ... Ron Haddrick
Sean, Sebastian, Emma, Kirsty's children

Mentioned:

Miss Evans, Sean's teacher
Dirty Dick, musician, Dirty Dick and the Yarra Valley Stompers
Sue Nicholls, friend of Kirsty
Kiffy Myers, friend of Kirsty
Mrs. Harris, Sebastian's teacher
Freddie Hubbard, writer who also works with Bustle
Don Dunstan, a musician
John, Kirsty's ex
Alan Bustle, Harry's son
Meredith Collins, Andrew's ex-wife
Andrew's receptionist, 19, with whom he had an affair
Robin and Mark Collins, Andrew and Meredith's children
Edith Marshall, friend of Irene on the cruise ship
Ronald Marshall, her son, from Alice Springs
Brian, Carmel's lover
Carmel's oldest son, caught her having sex with Brian
Helen, character in Andrew's novel, whose role Bustle wants to cut down
Morton Gould, character in Andrew's novel
Jimmy Hogg, another writer for Bustle, bi, married to a woman but caught with a Royal Shakespeare Company actor Arna Bustle, Harry's wife
May and Andrew, snobby friends of Irene who did not want her to marry Ken and would not attend Irene's father's funeral; Andrew's namesake
Ship's doctor, Indian
Di Calderstone, lived at the artist colony
Mary Penfield and her husband, first to leave the artist colony
Marcus, lived at the artist colony, supposedly had sex with Charlie's mare
Charlie Griffiths, lived at the artist colony, tried to get a stallion to mount his mare

== Notes ==
- Kiernan, Brian, David Williamson: A Writer's Career, Currency Press, 1996
