= Palace Theatre, Sydney =

Australian theatre

Coordinates: 33.8718°S 151.2080°E

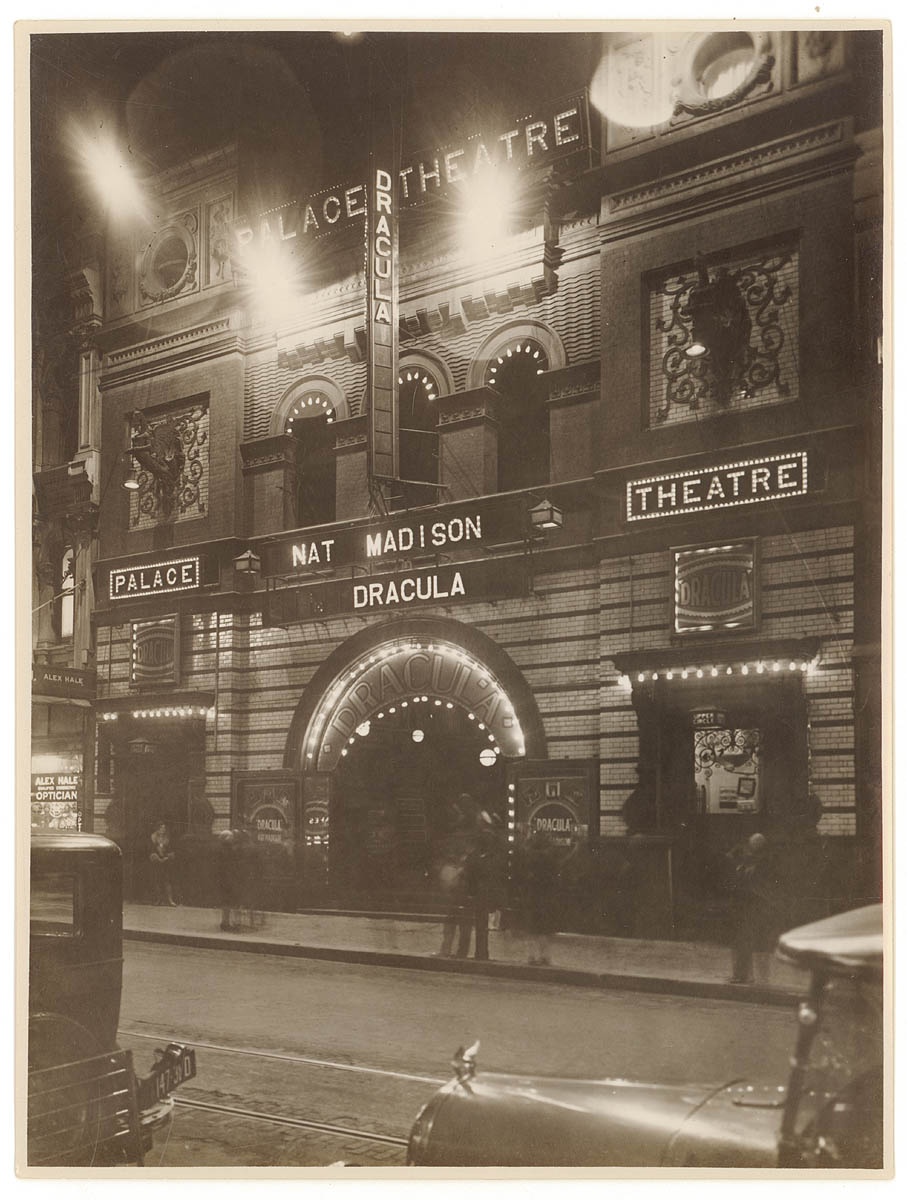
Palace Theatre, featuring Dracula starring Nat Madison, circa 1929

The Palace Theatre was a theatre located at 259–261 Pitt Street in the Sydney central business district. It was built in 1896 by businessman George Adams as a supplement to his Tattersall's Hotel next door. The theatre hosted live performances until the 1930s, when it was converted to a cinema. It was later switched back and forth between movies and live shows, until it closed in 1969. The building was demolished in 1970. The theatre's former lot is now covered by the Hilton Sydney.
