= Australian Elizabethan Theatre Trust =

Australian theatre and performing arts company

The Australian Elizabethan Theatre Trust (AETT) is an Australian theatre and performing arts company based in Sydney established in 1954. It is today especially known for its music scholarship program.

== History ==
The Australian Elizabethan Theatre Trust was established in September 1954, with the aim of establishing drama, opera and ballet companies nationally. It was founded by H.C. Coombs, governor of the Commonwealth Bank, Sir Charles Moses, general manager of the Australian Broadcasting Commission, and John Douglas Pringle of the Sydney Morning Herald.

The arts company was so named to commemorate Queen Elizabeth II's visit to Australia, after the trust raised £100,000 by a public appeal. The trust had an agreement with the Commonwealth government to match public donations "in the ratio of 1:3 and to provide ongoing funding". With substantial contributions from both the public and the Commonwealth Government, the Trust commemorated the first visit of the Queen, who had taken the title "Queen of Australia" in 1953, and since then The Trust has been the only arts body to bear her name.

The hope in 1954 was that there would occur in the arts a new "Elizabethan age", which would be as productive as the first in the sixteenth century.

=== Support for performing arts ===
The trust has nurtured and seen to independence many of Australia's most significant performing arts companies including Opera Australia and the Australian Ballet Foundation. The trust also formed, maintained and administered two music Opera and Ballet orchestras, one each in Sydney and Melbourne, to accompany ballet and opera companies, and one smaller orchestra of Sydney freelance musicians named the Elizabethan Sinfonietta.

The trust played a key role in establishing high culture in Australia through its involvement in setting up:

- The Elizabethan Theatre Trust Opera Company (now Opera Australia) in 1956
- The Elizabethan Opera Ballet Company, a short lived ballet company set up in 1957, and with J. C. Williamson Ltd the Australian Ballet Foundation in 1961 and the Australian Ballet School under the direction of Margaret Scott
- The Elizabethan Trust Orchestra in 1967, which in 1969 expanded into two orchestras, one each resident in Melbourne and Sydney. These orchestras became the Australian Opera and Ballet Orchestra in 1991, and State Orchestra of Victoria in 1986. The SOV has since been renamed Orchestra Victoria.

It has also supported:

- National Institute of Dramatic Art (NIDA)
- Marionette Theatre of Australia
- Australian Theatre of the Deaf
- Old Tote Theatre Company
- Melbourne Theatre Company
- South Australian Theatre Company.

Following the establishment of the Australia Council for the Arts in 1968, it ceased to be a funding body for opera and ballet in 1970.

In 1974, Geoffrey Wynter Armstrong bequeathed a sum of money to the trust to establish a memorial fund to be known as the Geoffrey Wynter Armstrong and Elizabeth Mary Martin Scholarship. The annual award is currently administered by Music & Opera Singers Trust Limited.

In 1982 it helped to fund the tour of Aboriginal playwright Bob Merritt's play The Cake Man to the World Theatre Festival in Denver, Colorado.

=== Change in focus ===
During the 1980s the Trust scaled back its operations and in the 1990s had a Sydney focus and operated a ticketing agency and organised theatre parties.

In 1990, the Trust went into provisional receivership and its operations were scaled back by its administrator. Its arts promotion role passed to the Australian Council for the Arts (later the Australia Council). Management of the trust was given back to the directors in 1992.

After the Trust ran into financial difficulties, Adelaide members Frank Ford (who had become a member of the Performing Arts Committee of the Trust in late 1974), along with Jessica Dames and Lynn Crosby, formed the Independent Arts Foundation in Adelaide in 1991, which as of 2026 continues to exist.

In 2000, the trust launched its international music scholarship program for Australian singers, musicians and conductors wishing to undertake overseas music study.

In 2004 the trust purchased the Independent Theatre at North Sydney and undertook a major acoustical and heritage refurbishment of the venue. This initiative resulted in the production of a fine chamber music venue with an outstanding acoustic quality for both performers and audience. The Trust sold the Independent in 2013 to Wenona School, who have continued the chamber music programs.

== People ==
Jeffry Joynton-Smith AM was general manager/CEO of the Australian Elizabethan Theatre Trust from 1969 until June 1984, when Kathleen Norris was appointed to replace him.

=== Chairs ===
- H. C. Coombs (founding chair)
- Aubrey Gibson (1966–1972)
- James Darling (1973–1975)
- Ian Potter (1975–1982)
- David Griffin (1982)
- Andrew Briger (1983–1989)
- James Strong (1989–1990)
- Lloyd D. S. Waddy (1992 – current (as of 2023)

=== Chief Executive ===
- Hugh Hunt
- Neil Hutchison (1959-1962)
- Stefan Haag

== Today ==
The Australian Elizabethan Theatre Trust (AETT) is a non-profit organisation dedicated to supporting the arts in Australia.

== Australian plays presented by the Trust ==
- Summer of the Seventeenth Doll (1955)
- The Tintookies (1956)
- Ned Kelly (1956)
- The Shifting Heart (1957)
- Curly on the Rack (1958)
- Little Fella Bindi (1958)
- Lola Montez (1958)
- The Slaughter of St Teresa's Day (1959)
- The Bastard Country (1959)
- The Magic Pudding (1960)
- The One Day of the Year (1961)
- Naked Island (1962) – at Union Theatre, Sydney
- Shipwreck (1962) – at Union Theatre, Sydney
- The Break (1962) – at Union Theatre, Sydney
- The Ballad of Angel's Alley (1962)
- The Ham Funeral (1962)
- The Season at Sarsaparilla (1962)
- Night of the Ding Dong (1966)

=== Plays sponsored by the Trust ===
- Swamp Creatures

== Plays ==
=== 1955 ===
- The Sleeping Prince by Terence Rattigan with Ralph Richardson and Sybil Thorndike(27 July - 5 Oct 1955) - first production
- Separate Tables by Terence Rattigan with Ralph Richardson and Sybil Thorndike (5 August 1955)
- Medea with Judith Anderson (11 Oct - 5 Nov 1955) - this production then toured
- The Little Hut presented with HM Tennant (8 Nov - 20 Dec 1955)

=== 1956 ===
- Summer of the Seventeenth Doll by Ray Lawler (10 - 30 Jan 1956) first Australian play
- The Boyfriend by Sandy Wilson (31 Jan - 24 March 1956) - in associ with JC Williamson made profit £1,836
- Summer of the Seventeenth Doll* by Ray Lawler (27 March - 19 April 1956) - return season - proft £3,541
- Twelfth Night by William Shakespeare (21 April - 17 May 1956)
- The Rivals (19 May-9 June 1956)
- The Tintookies (12 June - 7 July 1956) - presented concurrently with Mozart opera season - made profit £1,458
- Witness for the Prosecution (14 July - 29 Sept 1956) - co production
- Ned Kelly* by Douglas Stewart (3-27 October 1956) - made a loss of £9,137
- The Rainmaker by R Nash (20 Nov 1956) - replacement for Ned Kelly, presented in Sydney, Melbourne and Brisbane - loss of £17,118

=== 1957 ===
- Mozart season - Cosi Fan Tutte, Marriage of Figaro, The Magic Flute, Don Giovanni ) - this toured and lost £36,051
- Summer of the Seventeenth Doll return engagement (11 Feb 1957) - returned after tour with cast who would go to London
- The Beggar's Opera by John Gay (13 March 1957) - loss of £8,097
- Hamlet by William Shakespeare with Paul Rogers (27 April 1957)
- The Relapse by Sir John Van Brugh (15 May 1957) - would alternate with Hamlet - these productions toured
- La Boheme opera (31 Aug 1957)
- Otello opera (3 Sept 1957)
- The Bartered Bride opera (20 Sept 1957)
- The Shifting Heart* by Richard Beynon (4 October 1957)
- Cinderella a pantomime (23 Dec 1957)

=== 1958 ===
- The Shifting Heart (Jan 1958) - return season - profit £1,031
- Salad Days musical (31 Jan 1958)
- Time Rememebred by Jean Anoulih (7 May 1958)
- Look Back in Anger by John Osborne (4 June 1958) - lost £2,997
- The Barber of Seville (19 July 1958)
- The Happiest Days of Your Life by John Dighton with Margaret Rutherford (6 November 1957)
- Fidelo opera (19 July 1958) - part of 1958 opera season which lost £68,998
- Curly on the Rack* by Ru Pullan (3 September 1958) - lost £5,621
- Lola Montez* musical by Alan Burke, Peter Benjamin and Peter Stannard (22 October 1958) - lost £31,581
- Little Fella Bindi* (23 Dec 1958)

=== 1959 ===
- Slaughter of St Teresa's Day* by Peter Kenna (11 March - 4 April 1959) - with Trust Players
- Man and Supeman by George Bernard Shaw (8 April - 2 May 1959) - with Trust Players
- The Bastard Country* by Anthony Coburn (3-30 May 1959) - with the Trust Players
- Long Day's Journey Into Night by Eugene O'Neil (3-27 June 1959) - with Trust Players
- Julius Caesar by William Shakespeare (1-25 July 1959)
- Summer of the Seventeenth Doll (Aug 1959) - return season

=== 1960 ===
- The Magic Pudding - loss of £1,085
- Candida - loss of £4,619
- Charley's Aunt - loss of £7,1l6
- The Hostage - loss of £8,827

=== 1961 ===
- Lock Up Your Daughters - loss of £3,870
- The Most Happy Fellah - loss of £10,172
- The One Day of the Year - loss of £1,867
- Come Blow Your Horn - profit £6,158 - tour made profit £2,434
- Rigolotto - profit £819
- Leningrad ballet - profit £11,181

=== 1962 ===
- Man for All Seasons - loss of £14,266
- Australian Play Season (The Break, Shipwreck, Naked Island) - loss of £9,709
- Marionette theatre - loss £6,362
- The Miracle Worker - loss £5,412
- Nina - loss £3,277
- Saint Jack - loss £14,000
- The Ham Funeral - loss £3,884
- Write Me a Murder - loss £3,954
- Little Mary Sunshine - loss £5,515
- Once Upon a Mattress - loss £6,737
- Thorndike-Casson recitals - loss £1,147
- ballet - profit £5,538
- Come Blow Your Horn - profit £4,376
- Orpheus in the Underworld operetta - profit £6,875
- Sound of Music - profit £18,135

== See also ==
- Australian Opera and Ballet Orchestra
- Orchestra Victoria
- Regional Arts Australia
