= SGIO Theatre =

The State Government Insurance Office Theatre (also known as the SGIO Theatre or Suncorp Theatre), was a 600-seat proscenium theatre built within the SGIO office building at 179 Turbot Street, Brisbane, Queensland, Australia.

== History ==
The Queensland Government purchased the site of the old Albert Hall on Albert Street, a popular theatre venue, from the Methodist Church and the new theatre opened on 27 May 1969. It was designed by Conrad Gargett and Partners, with input from several of the Brisbane theatre companies. The exterior of the building reflected its function as an office building. The first production at the theatre was Peter Shaffer's The Royal Hunt of the Sun for the new Queensland Theatre Company (QTC). The QTC used the theatre as its chief venue for 30 years.

== Closure of the theatre ==
The government owned the SGIO and Twelfth Night theatres in Brisbane and following the success of the Commonwealth Games and World Expo 88 in Brisbane, plans proceeded on the development of the Queensland Performing Arts Centre at South Bank. The theatre closed in June 1998 when the Queensland Theatre Company relocated. The Amalgamated Property Group took ownership of the theatre building. The state government of Labor Premier Anna Bligh gave approval for the demolition of the taxpayer funded theatre.

A 35th anniversary commemoration of the theatre in 2004 for the Brisbane Festival led to it being re-opened for three productions in that year.

== Performers ==
Googie Withers and John McCallum performed in The Cocktail Hour.

Programmes and ephemera from productions that were performed at the theatre are held in the University of Queensland's Fryer Library.
