= The Square Ring =

The Square Ring may refer to:

- The Square Ring (play) a 1952 play by Ralph Peterson
- The Square Ring (1953 film), a British tragi-comic drama film, based on the play
- The Square Ring (1960 film), an Australian TV play
- The Square Ring (Play of the Week), a 1959 British TV play for Play of the Week
- Boxing ring, the space in which a boxing match occurs
