= Association of Australian Artistes =

The Association of Australian Artistes was established in London in 1975 by Australian expatriate James Hunt. It was based at Australia House and its aims and objectives were to present new Australian plays around London's Fringe featuring professional Australian actors then living in London. The inaugural Production Coordinator was Barbara Angell and a fund-raising concert was held in the Australia House basement on Sunday, 25 January 1976, coinciding with the Australia Day Weekend. Monies raised supported the group during its lifetime. Members included Ken Shorter, Darlene Johnson, Bob Hornery, Mark McManus. Playwrights who were premiered in London included Steve J. Spears. The Association continued for about 2 years, presenting at such as The Arts Theatre, The Gate and various pub rooms until security measures during the IRA bombing campaign inhibited audience attendances.
