= Kennedy family (Neighbours) =

Fictional soap opera family

- Neighbours family
- First appearance: 20 September 1994
- Introduced by: Stanley Walsh
- Duration: 1994–
Family members
- Tom Kennedy; Karl Kennedy; Malcolm Kennedy; Libby Kennedy; Billy Kennedy; Holly Hoyland; Ben Kirk; Jackson Kennedy; Susannah Kennedy

The Kennedy family are a fictional family from the Australian soap opera Neighbours. They have been a large part of the show since 1994, when the five-strong family moved into Ramsay Street. Both Karl Kennedy (Alan Fletcher) and his wife Susan (Jackie Woodburne) celebrated 20 years on the show in 2014, and are stalwarts of the fictional Erinsborough community, with Karl serving as the area's doctor and Susan as principal of Erinsborough High. They have earned multiple award nominations for their roles. The Kennedy family has expanded to introduce several others since its conception, although plays a relatively minor role as of 2014, with Karl and Susan as the only members of their family still residing in Ramsay Street.

Storylines of the Kennedy family have included troubles within Karl and Susan's marriage over their 20 years in the show, which included two separation periods in the 2000s and a divorce, teenage angst storylines for their three children Malcolm (Benjamin McNair), Billy (Jesse Spencer) and Libby (Kym Valentine), Karl's interaction with other Erinsborough residents through his job as a doctor, Susan's professions as school principal and also briefly editor of the Erinsborough News, and the death of Libby's husband in a riding accident shortly after the birth of their son.

== Creation and development ==
In 1994, the "solid" Kennedy family was introduced in an attempt to bring the show back to its family-orientated roots. Father Karl was given the job of GP and mother Susan was chosen as the new Erinsborough High principal to give the characters immediate links with other characters. Alan Fletcher, who previously appeared on the show in a minor role in 1987, was cast as Karl, while former Prisoner actress Jackie Woodburne was cast as Susan. Benjamin McNair, Kym Valentine and Jesse Spencer played Karl and Susan's three teenage children, Malcolm, Libby and Billy, respectively. They replaced the Willis family on the show and also as occupants of Number 28 Ramsay Street.

Karl and Susan's marriage was initially presented as strong, with both Woodburne and Fletcher commenting that they enjoyed them having a "really solid foundation for a marriage". However, they experienced marital difficulties when Karl cheated on Susan with his receptionist Sarah Beaumont (Nicola Charles) and, although they reconciled, this made Susan lose trust in Karl's commitment to their marriage. As a result, she wrongly accuses him of having an affair with Izzy Hoyland (Natalie Bassingthwaighte), and they divorce, with Karl eventually starting a relationship with Izzy. Susan briefly remarries to Alex Kinski (Andrew Clarke) and their step-children become part of the extended Kennedy family, with both Billy and Malcolm having left the series several years earlier. Susan and Karl eventually reunite, and, despite separating again for several years, they remain together on the soap today, 20 years after their initial debut.

Libby remained in the serial until 2011. In this time she married twice and had a son, Ben Kirk (most recently Felix Mallard), whose father Drew (Dan Paris) died in a riding accident. Karl's father Tom Kennedy (Bob Hornery) made guest appearances between 1996 and 2007, and was the first major character on the show to suffer from Alzheimer's disease.

In October 2014, Malcolm returned to visit his parents and tell them that he and Catherine were expecting their first child. Malcolm then asked his parents to consider moving to London to help out with the baby. The storyline marked Karl and Susan's 20th year in Neighbours and featured several flashbacks to previous episodes and storylines featuring the Kennedy family. Woodburne commented "It was scary seeing them – and astonishing that we've been on Ramsay Street for two decades!" After their friends gave them advice on whether they should stay or go, Karl and Susan decided to remain in Erinsborough.

== Storylines ==
The Kennedys, Karl (Alan Fletcher), Susan (Jackie Woodburne), Malcolm (Benjamin McNair), Libby (Kym Valentine) and Billy (Jesse Spencer), move from Greendale to Ramsay Street in late 1994. They initially struggle to adapt, but soon become settled, with Karl going into partnership with Tamsin Caldo (Soula Alexander) at the local medical clinic and Susan becoming a teacher at Erinsborough High. Billy befriends and gets into trouble with Toadie Rebecchi (Ryan Moloney), while Libby falls for Luke Handley (Bernard Curry), an older man and Malcolm starts a relationship with Danni Stark (Eliza Szonert). Despite being reasonably stable in his marriage, Karl develops feelings for Kate Cornwall (Christie Sistrunk), a terminally-ill patient and confesses to Susan that they kissed before she died. Susan forgives him, but her trust is shaken further when he cheats on her with his young attractive receptionist Sarah Beaumont (Nicola Charles). They briefly separate, but reconcile and try and put their trust issues behind them. Karl's father Tom Kennedy (Bob Hornery) visits and tells Karl that he is not his biological father, leading him to his real father, Ronald Davies-Smythe (Tony Hawkins). Karl does accept Ronald, but he dies shortly after and Karl continues to consider Tom as his father.

Karl feuds with Libby's boyfriend Darren Stark's (Todd MacDonald) mother Cheryl (Caroline Gillmer), but is devastated when, in trying to help her when she is knocked down by a lorry, he gives her drugs she is allergic to and she dies. As a result, Karl stops medical practice briefly but continues when he saves Malcolm's life via an emergency tracheotomy, establishing his own surgery in the Lassiter's Complex. Toadie moves in with the Kennedys when his family leave the area. Billy's long-term relationship with Anne Wilkinson (Brooke Satchwell) results in them moving away from the area in 2000. Libby and Darren's relationship breaks down when he cheats on her with Malcolm's girlfriend Catherine O'Brien (Radha Mitchell), and she later enters a new relationship with Drew Kirk (Dan Paris), but their marriage is seriously shaken when Libby is told she cannot have children after a motorcycle accident involving her best friend Steph Scully (Carla Bonner). However, miraculously, Libby becomes pregnant and has a son, Ben (currently Felix Mallard), but Drew dies a year later in a riding accident, devastating Libby. Malcolm and Catherine leave together and later marry off-screen, although he returns in 2002 as a ruthless businessman to open an English-based coffee shop in Erinsborough.

Susan slips on spilt milk and hits her head, resulting in retrograde amnesia. She fails to remember Karl or her children, believing she is a 16-year-old girl in 1972. After accepting what has happened to her, Susan still ends things with Karl, insistent that she does not know how to love him. They divorce, but decide to remarry after rekindling their feelings, and her memory returns in the wedding ceremony. Karl develops alcoholism when he is caught drink-driving and receives a large fine, but overcomes the addiction. Susan becomes suspicious that Karl has feelings for their neighbour, Izzy Hoyland (Natalie Bassingthwaighte), and Malcolm shares her suspicions when he briefly returns. He confronts her, and although he discovers there is nothing going on, Susan and Karl separate anyway and eventually divorce. Libby is reunited with Darren after moving on from Drew's death and they move away, leaving a separated Karl and Susan as the only remaining Kennedys.

While Karl and Izzy have a brief romance, Susan starts a relationship with Alex Kinski (Andrew Clarke), and he moves in with her, along with his two children Rachel (Caitlin Stasey) and Zeke (Matthew Werkmeister). Alex is diagnosed with Lymphoma however and he marries Susan on his deathbed. Rachel and Zeke's sister Katya (Dichen Lachman) moves in with them as well. Karl and Susan realise they are still in love with each other, and plan to remarry in London. Although the ceremony goes ahead, Izzy appears and gives birth to Karl's daughter, Holly Hoyland (currently Lucinda Armstrong Hall). Holly lives in London with Izzy but Karl visits her regularly and she visits Erinsborough a few times. Rachel and Zeke both eventually move out, with various lodgers including Summer Hoyland (Jordy Lucas) and Natasha Williams (Valentina Novakovic) living with the Kennedys at times.

Susan develops multiple sclerosis, leading Libby to move back home with Ben, her relationship with Darren over. Susan goes on a retreat but ultimately learns to manage her illness. Libby gets a job teaching at Erinsborough High, like her mother years before her. She dates her colleague Daniel Fitzgerald (Brett Tucker), and they eventually marry, with Daniel adopting Ben. Libby loses a baby and this prompts her to ask Susan to be her and Dan's surrogate. Susan becomes pregnant but loses the baby after an argument with Dan, causing Libby to blame her husband and their marriage to break down, with Dan leaving soon after. Libby lies in court to protect Steph when she kills Ringo Brown (Sam Clark) in a hit and run, but her lies are undone and Libby leaves to visit Ben, who is away attending boarding school.

Wanting a new challenge, Susan enrols at Eden Hill University, but receives threats about her status as a mature student. She discovers her tutor is behind the threats as he has a petty vendetta against her relating back to when she was his teacher. Malcolm returns for a visit and causes trouble by seducing Jade Mitchell (Gemma Pranita) when she is in a relationship. Karl and Susan's marriage hits brief difficulties but they work through their issues; however, when Susan grows close to dying patient Jim Dolan (Scott Parmeter) Karl feels threatened. They eventually separate again, upsetting Malcolm, although he is unable to reconcile them before he returns to London to reconcile with his wife Catherine. Susan moves out into a nearby flat and becomes editor of the Erinsborough News, employing Summer Hoyland. Karl and Susan's dog Audrey dies.

Carmel Tyler (Kirsty Child) visits and falls for Karl. She tries to kiss him, but he rejects her as he is still in love with Susan. Susan's boss Paul Robinson (Stefan Dennis) sells the Erinsborough News and Sarah Beaumont returns to oversee the merger between it and the West Waratah Star. Susan rejects a job from her due to her pride, and Sarah tries to rekindle her romance with Karl, although he again rejects her due to his feelings for Susan. When Sarah leaves, Karl and Susan reunite, just before they lodge their divorce papers. Susan gets her old job as school principal back, but due to the stress she is under she has a minor MS relapse. Susan also becomes a wedding celebrant, and marries her friends Georgia Brooks (Saskia Hampele) and Kyle Canning (Chris Milligan).

In 2014, the two elder Kennedy children pay visits. Holly meets Libby and Ben when she visits from London and Libby acts as school principal for a while, while Susan recovers from the flu. Ben admits that he wants to be known as Ben Kirk again, and leaves with Libby for Drew's hometown of Oakey to feel closer to his father. Malcolm later visits with the news that he and Catherine are having a baby, and he wants Karl and Susan to move to London to help him when the baby is born. Karl and Susan reminisce about their 20 years in the street and decide to stay. Nate Kinski (Meyne Wyatt) moves in with the Kennedys, as he is the nephew of Susan's ex-husband, Alex. Susan helps him navigate through post-traumatic stress from his time in the army. Karl invests in the local bar, Off-Air, and Susan agrees to do the monthly finances for him. Ben returns to Erinsborough and decides to permanently stay with Karl and Susan after naked pictures of him are posted online by his ex-girlfriend.

== Family members ==
- Tom Kennedy; married Molly Kennedy
  - Karl Kennedy; son of Molly and Ron Davies-Smythe; adopted by Tom; married Susan Smith
    - Malcolm Kennedy; son of Karl and Susan; married Catherine O'Brien
      - Susannah Kennedy, daughter of Malcolm and Catherine
    - Libby Kennedy; daughter of Karl and Susan; married Drew Kirk; married Daniel Fitzgerald
      - Ben Kirk; son of Libby and Drew
    - Billy Kennedy; son of Karl and Susan; married Anne Wilkinson
      - Jackson Kennedy; son of Billy and Anne
      - Unnamed twins; children of Billy and Anne
    - Holly Hoyland; daughter of Karl and Izzy Hoyland

== Reception ==
The Kennedy family, and Karl and Susan in particular, are considered an icon of Neighbours not just because of their long tenure on the show but also due to their memorable mix of comedic and dramatic storylines. At the 2007 Inside Soap Awards, Fletcher and Woodburne were nominated for "Best Soap Couple" and "Best Storyline" for Susan and Karl's wedding. This was the same the following year.

In 2007, the Herald Sun placed Karl's affair with Sarah at number eight on a list of Neighbours Top Ten moments. They said "In one of the most shocking storylines, no one could believe that the perfect Dr Karl, played by Alan Fletcher, could cheat on his wife of many years, Susan, played by Jackie Woodburne. But, that's exactly what happened when he couldn't resist his receptionist Sarah Beaumont played by the vampy Nicola Charles". In 2010, to celebrate Neighbours' 25th anniversary Sky, a British satellite broadcasting company profiled 25 characters of which they believed were the most memorable in the series history. Karl is in the list and describing him they state: "Karl and Susan became a truly legendary soap couple in an age when they have become thin on the ground. On paper, it's not quite clear why – they're just a pleasant, middle-class couple, and Karl can be a bit moany sometimes. But the important thing is it works, and watching the writers break them up and put them back together several times has made for great telly. And you know it's only a matter of time before Karl adds another unexpectedly sexy neighbour to his cheatin' list..." On Susan, they said "Kindly but strong matriarch Susan may not be the most medically robust woman (amnesia, multiple sclerosis, frequent questionable haircuts), but she gets by thanks to her family. She's so devoted, in fact, that after Malcolm, Billy and Libby (sort of) flew the nest, she went and inherited Zeke and Rachel from second husband Alex. Despite her big heart, she can be counted on to get fierce with anyone who tries to upset the Ramsay Street balance – her frequent fights with Izzy in the middle of the street over Karl cemented her reputation as everyone's favourite soap mum."

Teaching organisation TES commented on Woodburne's portrayal of Susan in terms of her suitability as a teacher. They said that "Susan Kennedy from Neighbours manages to be the comforting mother figure as well as coming down hard when necessary", and praised her for showing "the highs and lows of the job". In June 2014, Kerry Barrett from All About Soap was pleased to see Libby return, saying "We were just as thrilled as the Kennedys were to see lovely Lib back in Erinsborough. And when Karl asked if she had anything to go home to, we thought how brilliant it would be if she stayed." The returns of other characters including Holly Hoyland and Malcolm Kennedy were also praised as a worthy celebration of Susan and Karl's 20 years on Neighbours.

In January 2018, the Kennedy family were voted Australia's fourth All-Time Favourite TV Drama Family by readers of TV Tonight.

== Impact ==
In February 2015, British actor and Academy Award winner Eddie Redmayne revealed to a journalist from Elle UK magazine that he uses the work of Karl and Susan as acting inspiration. He said "Watch, and you'll find that everything they do is on another level of genius. I really do think so. They are the greatest unsung acting duo in history." Redmayne later told News.com.au he is a huge fan of the couple and that he learned a lot from them when he used to watch Neighbours daily. Both Fletcher and Woodburne responded to Redmayne's comments. Fletcher said, "To receive such generous praise from an actor of Eddie Redmayne's startling ability and status has been thrilling for both of us. It never ceases to excite me to hear examples of the influence Neighbours has had beyond Australia." Woodburne added, "It's always wonderful when someone compliments your work, but to have such lovely things said from such an incredibly talented actor is very humbling and means more to me than he will ever know."
