= Stewart Ginn (actor) =

Australian actor

- Born: Stewart Ginn; 2 January 1921
- Died: 20 September 1971 (aged 50); Melbourne
- Occupation: Actor

Stewart Ginn (2 January 1921 – 20 September 1971) was an Australian radio, stage and television actor, best known as the character Nancarrow in the 1960s television comedy My Name's McGooley, What's Yours?.

== Career ==
=== Radio ===
Stewart Ginn first became known in radio, after playing the main role in The Air Adventures of Hop Harrigan (1954), among other roles.

=== Stage ===
Ginn then became a stage actor, his credits including Sidney Howard's They Knew What They Wanted with Zoe Caldwell in 1953 and His Excellency with Barry Humphries in 1954, the latter winning him an Erik Kuttner Award. In 1954, he appeared in productions of The Heiress with Zoe Caldwell and Garson Kanin's Born Yesterday with Zoe Caldwell and Ray Lawler. He performed in Shakespeare's Henry V at the 1964 Adelaide Festival of Arts, alongside John Bell, Dennis Olsen, Anna Volska and Max Meldrum. He also appeared in John Mortimer's Lunch Hour in 1965, Eugene O'Neill's A Moon for the Misbegotten, alongside Ron Haddrick in 1966 and Arthur Miller's The Price (1970).

=== Television ===
In 1959, Ginn appeared in the television play They Were Big, They Were Blue, They Were Beautiful and went on to appear in further television plays such as The Big Killing, playing Inspector Fowler in 1965.

Between 1966 and 1968 he appeared as Peregrine Nancarrow in the television comedy My Name's McGooley, What's Yours?, alongside Gordon Chater, John Meillon and Judi Farr. In 1968 he won a Penguin Award as Best Supporting Actor for his portrayal of Nancarrow. That same year he reprised his role as Nancarrow in the spin-off series Rita and Wally.

He also appeared in television programs such as Homicide, Matlock Police, The Long Arm, Division 4, Spyforce and Birds in the Bush, and in the 1971 feature film Demonstrator.

== Death ==
Ginn died suddenly in September 1971, aged 49. He was in Melbourne at the time, where he was filming an episode of Division 4.

== Legacy ==
Hector Crawford praised Ginn's performance in the Matlock Police episode "The Word is Progress" as "one of the finest pieces of drama acting to come out of the Crawfords company".

== Filmography ==
=== Film ===
Year	Title	Role	Notes
1955	Three in One	Second Cab Driver	Segment: "The City"
1958	This Land Australia		Short film
1970	Adam's Woman	Williams	
1971	Demonstrator	Supt. Ackland	

=== Television ===
Year	Title	Role	Notes
1959	They Were Big, They Were Blue, They Were Beautiful		TV play
1961	Whiplash	Peebles	1 episode
1960	Close to the Roof	Wally Fox	TV play
1961	The Sergeant from Burralee	Nathaniel Carlton	TV play
1961	The Story of Peter Grey		156 episodes
1962	The Funnel Web	Det Sgt Lundy	TV play
1962	Consider Your Verdict	Robert Wilkins	1 episode
1962	The Patriots	Private Joseph Sudds	3 episodes
1962	Fly by Night		TV play
1963	Time Out	Isaac Nichols	1 episode
1963	Tribunal	Hans Van Meegeren	1 episode
1964	The Adventurers	The Boss	3 episodes
1965	The Big Killing	Inspector Fowler	TV play
1965	Moby Dick - Rehearsed	Middle Aged Axtor / Elijah and Carpenter	TV play
1965	The Stranger	Senator Anderson	Miniseries
1965	My Brother Jack	Vern	Miniseries, 5 episodes
1966	Australian Playhouse	Fred	2 episodes
1966–1968	My Name's McGooley, What's Yours?	Peregrine Nancarrow	88 episodes Won Penguin Award for Best Supporting Actor
1968	Rita and Wally	Peregrine Nancarrow / Vicar Barrington	3 episodes
1969	Skippy the Bush Kangaroo	Joe Farrell	1 episode
1969	Woobinda, Animal Doctor		1 episode
1969	Delta	Rankin	1 episode
1965–1969	Homicide	Various roles	3 episodes
1969; 1970	The Rovers	Ocker / Harris	2 episodes
1970	The Long Arm	Wally Mills	1 episode
1970	Barrier Reef	Travis	1 episode
1971	Dead Men Running	Matt Doherty	Miniseries, 6 episodes
1971	Matlock Police	Stewie Hall / Hudson	2 episodes
1969–1971	Division 4	Various roles	8 episodes
1971	Spyforce	Frank Newman	1 episode
1972	Birds in the Bush	Man in Car	1 episode

== Theatre ==
Year	Title	Role	Notes
1948	Frieda		Melbourne Little Theatre
1952	Antigone	Creon	University of Melbourne with Melbourne Little Theatre Company
1952	Montserrat		University of Melbourne with Tin Alley Players
1953	They Knew What They Wanted	Tony	University of Melbourne with Union Theatre Repertory Company
1954	His Excellency	His Excellency the Governor	University of Melbourne with Union Theatre Repertory Company; Won Erik Kuttner Award for his performance
1954	The Heiress	Dr Austin Sloper	University of Melbourne with Union Theatre Repertory Company
1954	Born Yesterday	Harry Brock	University of Melbourne with Union Theatre Repertory Company
1958	Curly on the Rack	Scobie	Elizabethan Theatre, Sydney
1961	Stop Press		Phillip Street Theatre, Sydney
1964	Henry V	Chorus	Tent Theatre, Adelaide, Tent Theatre, Sydney with AET Trust for Adelaide Festival of Arts
1965	Lunch Hour		AMP Theatrette, Sydney with Q Theatre Company
1966	A Moon for the Misbegotten	Phil Hogan	Old Tote Theatre, Sydney, Canberra Theatre, Russell Street Theatre, Melbourne with AET Trust
1970	The Price		Independent Theatre, Sydney, Canberra Theatre

== Radio ==
Year	Title	Role	Notes
1950s	Ellen Dodd		2UW radio series
1950s	The Right to Happiness	Uncle Peter	3UZ radio series
1951	In Theatre Street	Marven	Radio play
1954–	The Air Adventures of Hop Harrigan	Hop Harrigan	Artransa Radio series
1954–	Stairway to Fame		Gordon Grimsdale radio series
1954	Fat Man		Grace Gibson 2UW radio series
1958	Simon and Laura		General Motors Hour radio play
1950s–1960s	A Shot in the Dark	Bill Owen	Radio series
1950s–1960s	The Renegade		Radio series
Late 1950s	The Passionate Years		2UW radio series
c.1958	Radio Cab		Fidelity Radio series
1959–	Squad Room	Detective RJ Scanlon	Grace Gibson Radio series
1960s	The Big Fisherman		Grace Gibson Radio series
1960s	Sound of Thunder	Gregory Enger	Radio series
1960–	Exciting Lives		Grace Gibson radio series
1961–1962	Interpol Confidential		Radio series
1962	Dr Paul		Grace Gibson radio series
	Crime Five		Radio series
	Elephant Walk	George Carey	Grace Gibson radio series
	Phantom Time		Radio series
	Their Finest Hour		Radio series
