= Barbara Angell =

Australian writer

- Born: 6 March 1935 (age 91); Toorak, Victoria, Australia
- Other names: Barbara Angela Barr, Barb Angell, Angela Barr
- Education: Presbyterian Ladies' College, Melbourne., Melba Opera Trust
- Occupations: Actress; playwright/dramatist; scriptwriter; composer; director; producer; singer; dancer; choreographer; comic
- Years active: 1955-present
- Known for: The Mavis Bramston Show (actor and screenwriter); Neighbours as screenwriter; Shortland Street screenwriter

Barbara Angell (born 6 March 1935), also known as a performer as Barb Angell, Barbara Angela Angell, and Barbara Angel is an Australian actress, playwright, screenwriter, director, and producer, as well as a composer, singer and dancer, she was Australia's first female television comedy writer-entertainer. She has also worked internationally including a 20 year stint in the United Kingdom

As a playwright and scriptwriter she wrote under the pen name of Angela Barr, she wrote episodes, as well as music and lyrics for the early TV satirical comedy series The Mavis Bramston Show, and later writing scripts for soap opera including Neighbours and Home and Away as well as New Zealand medical series Shortland Street.

Angell has worked in all facets of the industry including cabaret, revue, musical comedy, vaudeville and radio and screen.

== Biography ==
=== Early life ===
Angell was born in Toorak, Victoria in 1935 and educated at Presbyterian Ladies' College. in Melbourne, before studying at the Melba Conservatorium as a soprano.

=== Theatre ===
Angell started her career early in theatre and began as an actress with the Melbourne Little Theatre (later St Martins) under Brett Randall and Irene Mitchell, for whom she debuted in their 1955 production of The Guinea Pig.

She worked as a dancer-comedian with the Tivoli Circuit from 1955 to 1958, and in comedy sketches.

She visited the UK briefly in 1959–60 where she performed a solo cabaret act, further featuring her comedy sketches, music and lyrics.

On returning to Australia, she formed a Revue company at Melbourne's Arrow Theatre uith Jon Finlayson and co-wrote and produced a series of productions there including Slings 'n' Arrows and Outrageous Fortune – the titles both from the one line in Shakespeare.

On stage, Barbara Angell starred again for the Tivoli in a production of Lilac Time with John Larsen and in The Wizard of Oz as Glinda the Good Witch opposite Reg Livermore's Wicked Witch.

Under the guidance of John McCallum at J. C. Williamson, she understudied Jill Perryman in Carnival and Maggie Fitzgibbon in Noël Coward's Sail Away.

She toured with J.C. Williamsons in the Peter Shaffer play Black Comedy

=== Actress and screenwriting ===
Angell was of the earliest faces on Australian television, appearing in Melbourne's first weekly TV variety series called Tivoli Party Time with a cast that included such stars as Buster Fidess and singer Don Williams. In this she wrote her own comedy material.

She wrote TV sketches, music and lyrics for the satirical Mavis Bramston Show from Episode 1 throughout its 4-year run and starred in it with Ron Frazer during its last 2 years.

=== Career in England ===
Angel relocated to England in 1969, where she spent the next 20 years appearing on stage, in films and TV dramas and comedies. She was production coordinator of the Association of Australian Artistes, based at the Australian High Commission in London. She leased The Arts Theatre in Great Newport Street, WC2, for lunchtime theatre in the 1970s and directed a series of plays including some of her own.

She wrote TV comedy sketches for Dave Allen and became a script assessor for the BBC's light entertainment department. Her TV play Some Day Man won a nationwide competition in the U.K. and was produced by David Cunliffe for Yorkshire Television in 1987. In 2005, Angell played a cameo role in the movie Superman Returns, filmed at Fox Studios, Sydney, Australia.

=== Publications ===
Angell has written several books, her first The Entertainment Machine was published in 1972 (Horwitz), her second, Voyage To Port Phillip, 1803 in 1983 (Nepean Historical Society) and her third book A Woman's War in 2003 (New Holland Publishers) but most of her writing career has been for television and the stage.

Her latest book The Coral Browne Story: Theatrical Life and Times of a Lustrous Australian was published in Sydney in May 2007 by her own company Angell Productions Pty Limited.

=== Education and personal life ===
In 2008 she attended Charles Stuart University and completed a professional research doctorate in Visual and Performing Arts, her major paper being Another Coral Browne Story: analysis of the continuing export of Australia's performing arts talent (yet to be published). She continues to teach and to write.

Angell was in a relationship for 43 years with her partner, Pat Gaye, an actress, who was also the first female film stunt driver in Britain, they remained together until her death.

== Filmography ==
Title	Year	Role	Note/s
Consider Your Verdict	1962	Doreen Barlow (2 episodes)	TV series
Contrabandits	1968	Nola	TV series
Homicide''	1969	Rosie Callen	TV series
Doctor in the House	1970	Margery Brown	TV series
No - That's Me Over Here!	1970	Woman	TV series
River of Gold	1971	Tina Marston	ABC Movie of the Week
Late Night Theatre	1972	Miss Eversholt	TV series
The Jensen Code	1973	Miss. Howard	
Not On Your Nellie	1974	Mrs. Smallpiece	
The Top Secret Life of Edgar Briggs	1974	Jennifer Briggs	TV series
Anne of Avonlea	1975	Mrs. Harrison	TV miniseries
All Creatures Great and Small	1978	Mrs. Mallard	TV series
Shoestring	1979	Tattooist	TV series
World's End	1981	Connie	TV series
Angels	1979-1982	3 roles	TV series
Prisoner	1983	Valerie Jacobs	TV series
Water Rats	2001	Mrs. Gooding	TV series
Fireflies	2004	Nina	TV movie
Fireflies	2004	Mena	TV series
Home and Away	2004	Pam Soames	TV series
Superman Returns	2006	Polly	Film
Love My Way	2007	Woman at Pokies	TV series
Chandon Pictures	2009	Margs	TV series

== Screenwriter ==
Title	Year
The Mavis Bramston Show	1964-1968
Dave Allen at Large	1971
Elephant Boy	1972
First Sight	1987
Home and Away	1990
Neighbours	1991-1997
Poippys Head	1998
Shortland Street	1992-2010

== See also ==
- Performing Arts Collection, Melbourne, The Barbara Angell Collection
