= The Square Ring (Play of the Week) =

- Play of the Week episode
- Episode no.: Season 4 Episode 40
- Directed by: Bill Hitchcock
- Written by: Jessica Morton
- Based on: The Square Ring by Ralph Peterson
- Original air date: 2 June 1959
- Running time: 90 mins

"The Square Ring" is a 1959 British TV play for Play of the Week with Sean Connery. It was based on a 1952 stage play by Ralph Peterson that had been turned into a British film in 1953.

== Premise ==
Several boxers share a dressing room in a boxing stadium over one night.

== Cast ==
- George Baker as Docker Starkie
- Sean Connery as Rick Martell
- Alan Bates as Eddie Burke
- David Davies as Danny Felton
- Alfred Burke as Frank Ford
- Thomas Heathcote as Sailor Johnston
- Percy Herbert as Rowdie Rawlings
- Vic Wise as Joe
- Harry Landis as Happy Coombes
- Arthur Gomez as the manager
- David Waller as the doctor
- Neil McCarthy as Watty

== Production ==
George Baker wrote in his memoirs that he was surprised and delighted to receive the offer to play Docker, as it was a character part. When he met director Bill Hitchcock he realised that Hitchcock actually wanted Stanley Baker but had sent it to George by mistake. However, George Baker played the role as he really wanted to do it.

The programme was produced by Associated-Rediffusion for the ITV network.

== Reception ==
The Birmingham Mail called Baker's performance a "remarkable transformation". The Daily Telegraph said it was "a tough uncompromising play" with "excellent performances".

Variety magazine thought it was a better adaptation of the play than the 1953 film version calling it:

One of the best legit offerings yet to hit the commercial networks and provided punchy, if not entirely socko, entertainment ... A supremely professional job of plotting and characterization, the piece showed the fault on the small screen, of being overweight in its philosophizing and ruminating about the hopeless lot of boxers after age 29 or thereabouts... Acting champ was undoubtedly Thomas Heathcote as the punch-sodden Sailor; it was a fine performance that ducked all dangers of gimmicking by mannerism. Harry Landis was in Heathcote's class... while Alan Bates jabbed in some telling work as the novice. If George Baker, as Docker, didn't entirely succeed, that was scarcely his fault...Sean Connery came over competently ... Direction was smooth and unaffected, saving its "touches" for just the right moments.
