= Ralph Peterson =

Ralph Peterson may refer to:

- Ralph Peterson Jr. (1962–2021), American jazz drummer and bandleader
- Ralph Peterson (writer) (1921–1996), Australian writer, actor and producer
