= The Big Killing =

The Big Killing may refer to:

- The Big Killing (1928 film), American silent comedy
- The Big Killing (Wednesday Theatre), a 1965 Australian live television drama
- The Big Killing, a 1996 novel by British author Robert Wilson
