= Gordon Chater =

English - Australian actor

Gordon Chater AM
- Gordon Chater appearing in The Mavis Bramston Show
- Born: Gordon Maitland Chater; 6 April 1922; North Kensington, West London, England, United Kingdom
- Died: 12 December 1999 (aged 77); Southport, Queensland, Australia
- Education: University of Cambridge
- Occupations: Actor, comedian
- Years active: 1944−1993
- Known for: The Mavis Bramston Show, My Name's McGooley, What's Yours?

Gordon Maitland Chater AM (6 April 1922 – 12 December 1999) was an English Australian comedian and actor, and recipient of the Gold Logie, he appeared in revue, theatre, radio, television and film, with a career spanning almost 50 years.

== Biography ==
=== Early life and career ===
Chater was born in North Kensington, London, Middlesex to Maitland Charter, a chartered accountant and Evelyn Eleanor Riach, and attended Cottesmore School. His mother had been born in Shanghai. He attended Cambridge University to study medicine but did not finish his degree. He did, however, take part in many student revues.

Arriving in Australia after World War II, Chater came to prominence as a stage and radio actor. He appeared in numerous radio shows and series, including Looking at Life (1951), a comedy series which dramatised everyday events and in which he starred alongside Gwen Plumb, Queenie Ashton and Ruth Cracknell. He was also cast in serious theatrical roles; including Yepikhodov in the 1963 Sydney season of Chekhov's The Cherry Orchard alongside Owen Weingott and Ron Haddrick. This critically lauded production was the debut of the Old Tote Theatre Company, the precursor to the Sydney Theatre Company. Within a few months of The Cherry Orchard he was once again performing original satirical comedy, such as the Phillip Street Theatre revues Do You Mind! with Jill Perryman, Judi Farr and Robina Beard.

== Screen and television roles ==
Chater appeared in TV movies and series. He became a national star when he was cast with Carol Raye and Barry Creyton in the Australian satirical television series The Mavis Bramston Show, for which he won the 1966 Gold Logie Award for Most Popular Personality on Australian Television. He cemented his popularity with the title role in the popular sitcom My Name's McGooley, What's Yours?, playing the elderly live-in father of a young married couple, played by John Meillon and Judi Farr. He appeared in many other television comedy series, including Snake Gully with Dad 'n' Dave (1972) with Garry McDonald, Marion Edward and Diane Craig and Mac and Merle (1973), which reunited him with Gwen Plumb.

Chater was critical of early Australian television direction which he characterised as too often "'feet, knees and in the distance pictures'. People watching TV are interested in people and close ups in Australia were hard to come by in the early days of Australian television."

== Theatre roles ==
Amongst work in many other shows, Chater appeared in The Rocky Horror Show in Brisbane in 1988, the Sydney Theatre Company production of The Importance of Being Earnest as both "Lane" and "Merriman" in 1990, and Lady Bracknell's Confinement at the Playhouse, in Melbourne in 1993.

Gordon Chater later worked in the United States, including appearing on Broadway.

In the 1970s Chater was particularly associated with the play The Elocution of Benjamin Franklin by Steve J. Spears, the stage role for which he became best known. The play broke new ground in Australian theatre with its shocking opening scene (in which Chater walked onstage naked) and its discussion of paedophilia.

== Radio ==
Chater also had a radio show on 2GB, in Sydney, opposite Gwen Plumb. In 1955 & 1956, he worked on the highly successful drama White Coolies, which was based on the diary of Sister Betty Jeffrey, written while she and other Australian nurses were held in a Japanese prison camp in World War Two. The series of more than 50 episodes, has been released for sale and download, by Grace Gibson Productions.

== Death ==
Chater died on 12 December 1999, aged 77 from heart disease in Southport, Queensland.

== Honours and awards ==
- Winner of the Macquarie Radio Award in 1952 for Comedy Performance on Radio
- Winner of the Gold Logie in 1966 for Most Popular Personality on Australian Television (The Mavis Bramston Show)
- Member of the Order of Australia (AM), 1999

== Filmography ==
=== Film ===
Year	Production	Role	Type
1958	Smiley Gets a Gun	Rev. Galbraith	Feature film
1963	My Three Angels	Convict	TV movie
1976	Me and Mr Thorne	Reginald Thorne	TV movie
1992	The Importance of Being Ernest	Lane, Merriman	TV movie
1993	This Won't Hurt a Bit	Dental Professor	Feature film

=== Television ===
Year	Production	Role	Type
1954	The Adventures of Long John Silver	Alfredo	TV series
1958/59	ITV Television Playhouse	Reverend Michael Brute / Victor Prine	TV series, 2 episodes: Various Heavens, Private Lives
1959	Armchair Theatre		TV series, Episode: To Ride A Tiger
1958/61	ITV Play of the Week	Henry Straker / Mr Bullivant	TV series, 2 episodes: Man and Superman, Break from Cover
1961	The Story of Peter Grey		TV series
1964	The Mavis Bramston Show	Various Characters	TV series
1966-68	My Name's McGooley, What's Yours?	Dominic McGooley	TV series, 88 episodes
1968	Rita and Wally	McGooley	TV series
1968	The Gordon Chater Show	Host	TV series
1971	The Godfathers	Jamieson	TV series
1972	Snake Gully with Dad and Dave	Dad Rudd	TV series
1974	Behind the Legend	Thomas Mitchell	TV series, Episode: Thomas Mitchell
	Mac and Merle	John "Mac" McInern	TV series
1975	The Dave Allen Show in Australia	Various	TV series
1975	Celebrity Squares	Himself	TV series, 2 episodes
1976	This Is Your Life	Himself	TV series
1976	Matlock Police	Doc. Horton	TV series
1980	Broadway on Showtime	Dr. Cedric Seward	TV series
1981	Parkinson in Australia	Guest	TV series

== Theatre ==
Year	Production	Role	Venue / Theatre Co.
1963	The Cherry Orchard		Old Tote Theatre
1970s	The Elocution of Benjamin Franklin		
1988	The Rocky Horror Show		Brisbane
1990	The Importance of Being Earnest	Lane / Merriman	Sydney Theatre Company
1993	Confinement		Playhouse, Melbourne
