= River of Gold (1971 film) =

1971 film directed by David Friedkin

River of Gold is a 1971 American TV movie (originally an unsold pilot) which aired as an ABC Movie of the Week.

The Los Angeles Times said it "looked as though people lost interest half way through".

== Plot ==
A pair of beach bums wind up in Acapulco, where they get involved in a search for a beautiful woman and a sunken treasure.

== Cast ==
- Ray Milland as Evelyn Rose
- Suzanne Pleshette as Anna
- Dack Rambo as Riley Briggs
- Roger Davis as Marcus McAllister
- Melissa Newman as Julie
- Pedro Armendáriz Jr. as Angel
- Barbara Angell as Tina Marston
- Pancho Córdova as priest
