= Yes, What? =

Australian radio comedy series

- Genre: Radio sitcom
- Running time: 12 minutes
- Country of origin: Australia
- Language: English
- Starring: Ralph Peterson, Jack Craig-Gardiner, Jim Williams, Frank McCarron, Richard Harding-Browne.
- Written by: Rex Dawe
- Directed by: Rex Dawe
- Produced by: Rex Dawe
- Original release: June 23, 1936 – 1941
- No. of episodes: 520.

Yes, What? is an Australian radio comedy first broadcast from June 1936 until 1941, it was one of the best known examples of Australian radio comedy. Originally called The Fourth Form at St Percy's, it was a comedy set in a school classroom. The program ran for 520 episodes and was written, produced and directed by Rex Dawe. Its "recorded episodes" were "broadcast continually for 60 years".

A coloured Yes, What? cartoon book was drawn by Emile Mercier and published in 1947 by the program's then sponsor on Sydney radio station 2CH, the Samuel Taylor chemical company, which manufactured the Australian insecticide Mortein.

Yes, What? was added to the National Film and Sound Archive's Sounds of Australia registry in 2013.

== History ==
Yes, What? began its life as The Fourth Form at St Percy's. It was based on the radio serial The Fourth Form at St Michael's by Will Hay, which aired in the 1920s. Rex Dawe, a young Adelaide broadcaster, wrote the program after having the concept pitched to him by Rex Heading. 5AD program manager Morrie Chapman granted a fifty shillings budget for the show as well as an additional ten shillings for the writer / producer. The cast were mostly chosen from a youth production group The Kangaroo Club. Fifteen-year-old Ralph Peterson was hired to play the larrikin Bottomly and is often described as being a classroom rebel himself. The character Greenbottle, a disruptive student who usually arrived late with some implausible excuse, was voiced by Jack Craig-Gardiner, born in 1915 so only a few years Dawe's junior. The youngest member of the class, Jim Williams, played Standforth, beginning when he was 14. Dawe cast himself as the school-master Dr Pym.

Other characters, such as Mr Snootles, played by Frank McCarron, were introduced as the show's popularity increased. The name was changed to Yes, What? after studio executives decided the old title was too long and something more catchy was needed. Richard Harding-Browne first appeared in the show as a barrister in episode 49 and was later given his own character, Francis Marmaduke Algernon de Pledge" (a.k.a. "Pickles"). In March 1940 Gardiner had health problems which prevented him from playing Greenbottle, so that character temporarily left the show in episode 342, on the pretext of attending university and de Pledge arrived in episode 344. Greenbottle returned in episode 394 and the cast of four pupils continued until episode 437, when de Pledge left the show, as Harding-Browne had enlisted in the RAAF.

The show first aired on 23 June 1936 at 9:15 pm. The show's timeslot was occasionally altered but for the most part it was given air twice per week, on Tuesday and Thursday nights. There were 520 episodes produced, the first 50 or so went live to air without being recorded. A total of 130 hours were broadcast before the show ended in 1941, two years after the outbreak of the Second World War. However, the show was rerun countless times even outside of Australia, with New Zealand and South Africa both popular audiences. Episodes 209 to 520 were the most commonly broadcast as earlier episodes were not as fast-paced nor regarded as favourably. For instance, the character Greenbottle initially resembled an old man rather than the falsetto miscreant audiences were more familiar with. Dawe later attempted to revive the character of Dr Pym in the series Dr Pym's Progress but this was a critical and commercial failure.

== Episode format ==
Each episode typically covers an entire school lesson, despite being only about 12 minutes long. Themes often continue through a series of lessons in subsequent episodes. The students try to disrupt or confuse Dr Pym through distractions, unrelated questions and personal stories. The lessons were sometimes set outside the classroom, such as when the class went on an excursion. Each episode was recorded onto a 15-minute disc, so the length was crucial as space had to be left for a sponsor's message before and after the broadcast. The quick rhythm of the program led many to believe that the heavily scripted episodes were ad-lib. The characters spoke fairly quickly for a radio piece, which added to the realism of the broadcasts. The use of special effects was limited and most sounds, such as the bell, the door and the stick were performed by the cast members during the recording. Typically, the line "Good morning boys" by Dr Pym followed by the boys chorusing "Good morning, Sir!" was said at the start and end of each episode, with Dr Pym speaking crisply and the boys' reply drawn out ("Gooooood morning, Sir!").

== Final episode, 520 ==
In this final episode, Bottomly places a "For Sale" sign outside the classroom while Dr Pym and Mr Snootles share a lottery ticket. When a man offers Dr Pym money, he mistakes the man for a lottery representative, only to find he has sold the school. As a result, Bottomly recommends that Dr Pym retires.

== Main characters ==
=== Dr Percival Archibald Pym ===
The schoolmaster who tirelessly attempts to control his class while mayhem breaks out, Dr Percival Pym is forced to employ his cane to keep his pupils in line. His pupils, particularly Bottomly, jocularly refer to him as "Percy". He is fairly gullible, allowing the boys to frequently trick him into dismissing them from class as well as a con-man to relieve him of a large sum of money in episode 227. Pym is easily side-tracked by the boys and so often loses his temper. He will generally persist with a subject with little success over several lessons before abandoning it to try a new topic in the hopes that his pupils will eventually learn something. He is known to be overweight and he is often insecure about his inadequacy as a teacher. A recurring gag is Dr Pym's (often unintentional) rudeness to policemen, Mr Snootles, and other guests to the classroom, usually due to being confused or upset by his students. In response to continual usage of the word "yes" by Greenbottle and Mr Snootles (even when they mean no), Dr Pym asks, "Yes, what?", from which the show derives its name. Pym was portrayed by Rex "Waca" Dawe.

=== Rupert Bottomly ===
Bottomly is the class clown who uses his time in between classes to plan means of disrupting the next class. Despite proving himself capable of the workload more than a few times he nonetheless gives deliberately silly answers to questions Dr Pym asks. He makes continual quips and appears to have little fear of the cane. This is probably due to Bottomly having had the stick too many times for it to be adequate punishment and he considers many of his jokes worth the pain he will receive. Bottomly takes charge of lessons with his cheekiness quite often and is essentially the ringleader of the group of boys. He is quite happy to allow Greenbottle to be centre of attention, though, to waste more time than he could on his own. While he is not very intelligent in the traditional sense, he is very crafty; he cheats whenever he can in the tests and examinations Dr Pym gives him and such cheating usually goes unnoticed until the end of the episode. He has also contributed to the destruction of the school on two occasions, once by burning it down in a fireworks explosion. The second time, he inadvertently destroyed the classroom by switching chemical bottle labels, which Dr Pym proceeded to mix, causing an explosion that destroyed the classroom. Bottomly was played by Ralph Peterson

=== Ronald George Standforth ===
Standforth is (until De Pledge's arrival at least) the only member of the class keen on learning although he is handicapped by his lack of brains. Due to lacking understanding of more or less anything Dr Pym says, he asks questions that are either so simple Dr Pym scolds his stupidity, or so irrelevant to the topic he leaves his teacher horribly confused. Just after having had information painstakingly explained to the class, Standforth often asks, "Why, Sir?" or "How do you mean, Sir?" to Dr Pym. Questions such as these cause Dr Pym to lose his temper; he continuously mocks Standforth's dull intellect and canes him. As a result of this sort of humour, Standforth generally has the fewest lines of any of the regular cast. Standforth shares a rocky relationship with Bottomly who makes fun of his intellect but the two appear to get along most of the time. While in the show for the comedic effect of his ignorance, his only deliberate attempt at humour comes in episode 500 and it is poorly received by his classmates. He was portrayed by Jim Williams, the youngest member of the cast.

=== Cuthbert Horace Greenbottle Jr ===
Greenbottle is a member of a large family who all appear to be suffering from madness. His frequent meetings with them invariably make him late for class. He explains ludicrous tales by way of an excuse for his tardiness, often involving his family members or descriptions of his ludicrously designed house. He considers himself an expert on all topics, boasting that whatever subject the class is studying at the time is his best. He often claims to possess skills he really lacks, such as a brilliant singing voice and an expertise in poetry. This does not deter him from demonstrating his self-proclaimed talents. The extent of Greenbottle's lunacy is ambiguous as it is unclear how many of his eccentric habits are feigned to waste time and how many are inherent to his personality. His habit of saying "Yes" all the time causes Dr Pym to answer "Yes, What?", to which Greenbottle will often expound ridiculous theories or family stories. Greenbottle was played by Jack Craig-Gardiner although he left the cast for a brief period due to illness. Craig-Gardiner contributed many other minor voices to the series. For example, Greenbottle Senior and the boxer 'Dangerous Dynamite Dixon' from Episode 228.

=== Francis Marmaduke Algenon de Pledge ===
De Pledge is, compared to his classmates, a genius. Posh and formal, he is the only member of the class who does not give Dr Pym any headaches. He was introduced into the show following Greenbottle's brief exit but remained in the cast after his return up until his voice, Richard Harding-Browne, joined the air force. De Pledge is able to answer almost any question given to him although given how little work the fourth form manages to complete this is not saying much. Despite being the teacher's pet, he occasionally annoys Dr Pym with his pompous manner and his hastiness to answer questions not directed at him. He resists taking part in Bottomly's schemes but is occasionally tricked into contributing anyway. He is nicknamed "Pickles" after Bottomly decides his full name is too difficult to remember.

== Recurring guest characters ==
=== Mr Basil Cornelius Snootles ===
Mr Snootles first appears in episode 75 as a photographer attempting to take a snap of the class. His full name is Basil Cornelius Snootles. His unusual quavering voice leads to much mirth among the class. He re-appears in episodes 103 and 104 and is subsequently hired as the school caretaker. He is an avid bird lover and tries to give the boys a lesson on "bird-life, its meaning and importance" after being elevated to assistant school-master. He is prone to singing while he works which annoys Dr Pym. He continually pesters Dr Pym about his wages as it appears he doesn't receive any. His appearances in the class-room lead the boys, particularly Bottomly and Greenbottle, to imitate his voice. Mr Snootles is often a victim of Dr Pym's bullying, both intentional and accidental, and the strained relationship between the two is used as a frequent subject of humour. Like Greenbottle, Mr Snootles says the word "Yes" often, prompting Dr Pym to say, "Yes, what?" He was played by Frank McCarron who also provided a number of minor voices for the series.

=== Daphne ===
Daphne is Bottomly's "sweet-heart" and occasional assistant to his plots to disrupt the lesson. She is quite taken by Bottomly although he is very embarrassed about it and tries to save face whenever she turns up around his friends. She is forbidden from entering the school-grounds by Dr Pym in an effort to prevent her distracting the class but this does little to prevent her appearances. It has been suggested that Alice Creed, who portrayed her, was the real-life fancy of Ralph Peterson (Bottomly) but in a 1961 radio interview, Peterson made no mention of this and added "[I] very stupidly have forgotten" who played her.

== Commercial releases ==
Grace Gibson Productions commenced releasing the "broadcast episodes" series (episodes 209-520) in correct chronological order in December 2013, with Volumes 1 and 2 being released through their online retail store. Each Grace Gibson volume contains 20 episodes, available to purchase in various digital formats (MP3, USB or MP3 CD), except for Volume 16, which contains 12 episodes (plus bonus audio of the 1969 Cast Reunion).

As of August 2024, 18 volumes are available for purchase from Grace Gibson Radio, comprising 16 volumes of all 312 broadcast episodes, together with 2 "Missing Episodes" volumes, comprising 40 of the surviving episodes from the "non-broadcast" range (episodes 1 to 208).

The content of the Grace Gibson MP3 CD range is as follows:

- Volume 1 : 1-20 [Actual 209-228] (2013)
- Volume 2 : 21-40 [Actual 229-248] (2013)
- Volume 3 : 41-60 [Actual 249-268] (2014)
- Volume 4 : 61-80 [Actual 269-288] (2014)
- Volume 5 : 81-100 [Actual 289-308] (2014)
- Volume 6 : 101-120 [Actual 309-328] (2015)
- Volume 7 : 121-140 [Actual 329-348] (2015)
- Volume 8 : 141-160 [Actual 349-368] (2015)
- Volume 9 : 161-180 [Actual 369-388] (9 September 2015)
- Volume 10 : 181-200 [Actual 389-408] (29 January 2016)
- Volume 11 : 201-220 [Actual 409-428] (7 July 2016)
- Volume 12 : 221-240 [Actual 429-448] (18 February 2017)
- Volume 13 : 241-260 [Actual 449-468] (4 August 2017)
- Volume 14 : 261-280 [Actual 469-488] (12 January 2018)
- Volume 15 : 281-300 [Actual 489-508]
- Volume 16 : 301-312 [Actual 509-520]; Plus 5AD 1969 Cast Reunion
- Missing Episodes Vol 1 : [Episodes 29, 30, 37, 38, 45, 46, 47, 48, 53, 54, 55, 56, 57, 58, 59, 60, 61, 62, 63 & 69]
- Missing Episodes Vol 2 : [Episodes 70, 72, 73, 75, 76, 77, 78, 79, 80, 81, 82, 83, 84, 88, 89, 90, 91, 92, 93 & 94]

There are 53 surviving episodes of the first 208, as of August 2024 there are 13 which remain unreleased by Grace Gibson.
To celebrate the show's 80th anniversary, Grace Gibson Productions released the 1969 cast reunion and interview on CD on 10 June 2016 - the reunion was subsequently included in Volume 16 of the Grace Gibson CD series.

Prior to the Grace Gibson releases, nine volumes of Yes, What? were released on CD (utilizing full CD sound quality) by SonyBMG (now Sony Music) in Australia from 1992 with individual releases (and Volumes 1, 2 and 3 were released in Australia by Columbia in 2001); but have since been discontinued. Of those, each volume typically contained 12 episodes on each two-CD set, although the first volume boasted interviews with the cast and so contained fewer episodes. The individual CDs were collected into three box sets in 2008.
