= Thomas Heathcote =

British actor (1917–1986)

- Born: Thomas Ian Deacon Heathcote; 9 September 1917; Simla, Himachal Pradesh, India
- Died: 5 January 1986 (aged 68); London, England
- Years active: 1939–1986

Thomas Heathcote (9 September 1917 – 5 January 1986) was a British character actor, a former protégé of Laurence Olivier.

He was educated at Bradfield College in Bradfield, near Reading in Berkshire, England. His films included A Night to Remember (1958), Village of the Damned (1960), Billy Budd (1962), A Man for All Seasons (1966), Night of the Big Heat (1967) and Quatermass and the Pit (1967). On television he had notable guest roles in Dixon of Dock Green, The Prisoner, Z-Cars and The Onedin Line, and several years as farmer Ed Lawton in the teatime soap Crossroads. Heathcote was also a regular actor in BBC radio drama, notably in several series of Paul Temple.

== Selected filmography ==
- Dance Hall (1950) - Fred
- Cloudburst (1951) - Jackie
- Malta Story (1953) - Soldier (uncredited)
- The Sword and the Rose (1953) - Wrestling Second
- The Red Beret (1953) - Alf
- Blood Orange (1953) - Detective Sgt. Jessup
- The Large Rope (1953) - James Gore
- The Seekers (1954) - Sgt. Paul
- Betrayed (1954) - Paratropper Corporal (uncredited)
- Above Us the Waves (1955) - Hutchins
- Doctor at Sea (1955) - Wilson
- The Last Man to Hang (1956) - Bracket
- Eyewitness (1956) - Tom - Barman (uncredited)
- Tiger in the Smoke (1956) - Rolly Gripper
- Yangtse Incident: The Story of H.M.S. Amethyst (1957) - Mr. Monaghan RN
- A Night to Remember (1958) - Steward
- Tread Softly Stranger (1958) - Sergeant Lamb
- Dial 999 (TV series) ('Commando Crook', episode) (1958)- Sgt. Quigley
- The Square Ring (1959)
- Village of the Damned (1960) - James Pawle
- On the Fiddle (1961) - Sergeant
- Billy Budd (1962) - Alan Payne - Maintopman
- For Whom the Bell Tolls (1965) - Gomez
- A Man for All Seasons (1966) - Boatman
- Night of the Big Heat (1967) - Bob Hayward
- Quatermass and the Pit (1967) - Vicar
- The Fixer (1968) - Proshko
- Julius Caesar (1970) - Flavius
- The Abominable Dr. Phibes (1971) .- 2nd Policeman
- Burke & Hare (1972) - Paterson
- Demons of the Mind (1972) - Coachman
- Luther (1974) - Lucas
- Trial by Combat (1976) - Tramp
- The Jigsaw Man (1983) - Gamekeeper
- Sword of the Valiant (1984) - Armourer
- The Shooting Party (1985) - Ogden
