= Betty Lucas =

Australian character actress and theatre director

- Lucas during her stint in TV series Prisoner as Clara Goddard during series 1 in 1979
- Born: Betty Helen Lucas; 31 May 1924; Coogee, New South Wales, Australia
- Died: 7 April 2015 (aged 90)
- Other name: Betty Lucas Peterson
- Occupations: Actress, theatre director
- Years active: 1945–2011
- Spouse: Ralph Peterson

Betty Helen Lucas (31 May 1924 – 7 April 2015), also known as Betty Lucas Peterson, was an Australian character actress and theatre director, known for her numerous roles on stage and television, starting from the post-WWII years in 1945.

== Early life ==
Lucas was born in the Sydney suburb of Coogee, New South Wales to Walter Lucas and Marion Gibson. She trained with May Hollinworth at her Metropolitan Theatre.

== Career ==
She moved to London in the early 1950s and appeared in stage roles, returning to Australia in 1965, she featured in TV serials, including played prominent roles in Prisoner as Clara Goddard in 1979, Taurus Rising as Faith Drysdale in 1982, and Richmond Hill as Mavis Roberts in 1988, Her numerous credits in TV roles in guest appearances in serials included Homicide, Division 4, Matlock Police, Certain Women, A Country Practice, The Flying Doctors, Blue Heelers, All Saints, Always Greener. and Packed to the Rafters

== Personal life ==
Lucas married in 1946 the actor, producer and writer Ralph Peterson, he died in 1996 and their son, Joel Peterson (1954–2017), became a cinematographer.

== Filmography ==
=== Film ===
Year	Title	Role	Notes
1957	Three in One	Freda	Feature film (segment: "The City")
1971	3 to Go	Mother (Segment "Michael")	Short film
1971	Girl in Australia	Train Passenger	Feature film
1974	Between Wars	Mrs. Trenbow	Feature film
1980	Rat Race	Regina	Feature film, FRANCE
1983	Stanley (aka Stanley: Every Home Should Have One)	Lady Dunstan	Feature film
1984	My First Wife	Helen's Mother	Feature film
1990	Wendy Cracked a Walnut (aka ...Almost)	Mrs. Taggart	Feature film
1998	They	Eight	Short film
2005	Feed	Janet	Feature film
2006	Jindabyne	Vanessa	Feature film
2006	Pass Time	Harriett	Short film
2009	The Ballad of Betty & Joe	The Fortune Teller	Short film
2010	Herman and Marjorie	Marjorie	Short film
2011	Cupid	Frida	Short film

=== Television ===
Year	Title	Role	Notes
1957	The Shadow of Doubt		Teleplay
1961	Whiplash	Guest lead role: Jo Acton	TV series, episode: "The Legacy"
1962	ITV Play of the Week	Guest role: Rose Jameson	TV series, episode: "Lean Liberty"
1965	Dark Corridor		Teleplay
1967, 1970–73	Homicide	Barbara Mason / Lisa Walters / Elsie Roberts / Florrie / Margaret Belmont / Shirley Barrett / Sybil Reid	TV series, 7 episodes
1968	The Queen's Bishop	Queen Pauline	Teleplay
1968	Fiends of the Family	Virginia	Teleplay
1969–73	Division 4	Rene Fisher / Mrs. McKenzie / Edie Suttle / Betty Parsons	TV series, 4 episodes
1971	What For Marianne?	Mrs. Malden	TV film
1971, 1973	Matlock Police	Nora Gould / Bess Anderson	TV series, 2 episodes: "The End of the Road", "Poor Jacko"
1974	Things That Go Bump in the Night	Irene	TV series, episode: "I See a Dark Stranger"
1974	This Love Affair	Guest role	TV series, 1 episode
1974	Silent Number	Guest role	TV series, 1 episode
1974–75	Certain Women	Heather	TV series, 9 episodes
1975	The Seven Ages of Man	Guest role	TV series, 1 episode
1976	Do I Have to Kill My Child?	Florence	TV film
1976	The Alternative	Melanie's Mother	TV film
1978	Case for the Defence	Fiona Malcolm	TV series, episode: "A Plea of Insanity"
1978	Cop Shop	Mary Reynolds	TV series, 2 episodes: "1.205", "1.206"
1979	Prisoner	Clara Goddard	TV series, 10 episodes
1979	The Young Doctors	Sophie Bertram	TV series, 3 episodes
1980	Cop Shop	Mary Reynolds	TV series, 2 episodes: "1.205", "1.206"
1981	Bellamy	Rose	TV series, episode 9: "Hot Shot"
1981	Punishment	Guest role	TV series, 1 episode
1981	Homicide Squad	Shirley Niven	TV film
1981; 1984; 1991	A Country Practice	Mrs. Bourke / Nancy Holt / Dot Dalton	TV series, 6 episodes
1982	The Don Lane Show	Guest	TV series, 1 episode
1982	Taurus Rising	Faith Drysdale	TV series
1982	Silent Reach	Sister Beatrix	TV miniseries, 2 episodes
1983	The Body Corporate	Joan Stelow	TV film
1983	All the Rivers Run	Janet Raeburn	TV miniseries, 2 episodes: "Part 4", "Part 7"
1983	Skin Deep	Betty Kennedy	TV film
1984	Runaway Island	The Hag	TV series, 2 episodes: "The Treasure of the Conquistadores: Parts 1 & 2"
1987; 1989	The Flying Doctors	Ethel Cameron / Phillipa	TV series, 2 episodes: "Give a Dog a Bad Name", "A Rhyme for Reason"
1987	Willing and Abel	Lead guest role: Maisie	TV series, 1 episode
1988	Richmond Hill	Mavis Roberts	TV series, episodes: "1.11", "1.35", "1.90"
1988	The Last Resort		TV series
1988	The Dirtwater Dynasty	Land Lady	TV miniseries, 1 episode
1989	The Family Business	Regular role	TV series, 13 episodes
1989	Tanamera – Lion of Singapore	Lady Bradshaw	TV miniseries, 7 episodes
1990	More Winners	Mrs. Finkel	TV film series, episode: "Mr Edmund"
1991; 1995	G.P.	Elwyn Matthews / Miss Shepherd	TV series, 2 episodes: "Darby & Joan", "Those Who Can't"
1993	Seven Deadly Sins		TV series, 1 episode
1993	Hey Dad..!	R.J. Thomas	TV series, episode: "Fishy Business"
1993	Joh's Jury	Evelyn	TV film
1994	Mother and Son	Mavis	TV series, episode: "The Lamingtons"
1996	Pacific Drive	Vonnie Wentworth	TV pilot
1996	Water Rats	Sybil Graham	TV series, episode: "Goldstein & Son"
1996	Heartbreak High	Violet Abernathy	TV series, episode: "4.16"
1998	Murder Call	Prudence Smith	TV series, episode: "Mix 'n' Match"
1999, 2002, 2006, 2009	All Saints	Sister Bernard / Hannah McNamara / Mae Mooney	TV series, 6 episodes
2000, 2003	Blue Heelers	Mary Barton / Dorothy Falcon-Price	TV series, 2 episodes: "Welcome Back", "Father's Day: Part 2"
2001–02	Always Greener	Florence Holiday	TV series, 5 episodes
2002	Young Lions	Grace Beaumont	TV series, episode: "Asylum Seekers"
2005	The Surgeon	Miriam Beck	TV series, 2 episodes: "1.5", "1.7"
2010	Packed to the Rafters	Mrs. Luscombe	TV series, episode: "To Tell or Not to Tell"
