= My Name's McGooley, What's Yours? =

Australian television series

- Genre: Comedy
- Created by: Ralph Petersen
- Written by: Ralph Peterson
- Directed by: Ron Way
- Starring: Gordon Chater; John Meillon; Judi Farr; Stewart Ginn; Robert McDarra; Noeline Brown; Frank Taylor
- Music by: Tommy Tycho – Flute and Accordion duet
- Country of origin: Australia
- Original language: English
- No. of seasons: 3
- No. of episodes: 88

Production
- Producer: Ralph Peterson
- Production locations: Sydney, Australia
- Running time: 30 minutes

Original release
- Network: Seven Network (ATN7)
- Release: 13 October 1966 – 29 February 1968

My Name's McGooley, What's Yours? is a popular Australian situation comedy series produced by the Seven Network (station ATN7) from 1966 to 1968 and revived briefly as a radio series by the ABC in 1976.

== Premise ==
The situation involved a young couple, Wally and Rita Stiller (John Meillon and Judi Farr), living in Balmain with Rita's father Dominic McGooley (Gordon Chater). Also in the regular cast were Stewart Ginn as McGooley's friend Nancarrow, Robert McDarra as Donk Rogers, and Noeline Brown as Wally's sister Possum. Chater and Brown were well-known to television viewers from The Mavis Bramston Show.

The comedy of the series came from the clash of two generations living under one roof, a situation possibly inspired by the success of the 1960s British comedies Steptoe and Son and Till Death Us Do Part. Although only 44 when the show began, a heavily made-up Chater played a curmudgeonly senior citizen who enjoyed irritating his son-in-law and fishing with his mates in prohibited areas of Sydney Harbour.

== Production ==
Most episodes were written by creator-producer Ralph Peterson and directed by Ron Way. Way was arguably better known for musical and variety specials but would go on to direct the series Good Morning Mr Doubleday and, later, the thriller Frenchman's Farm. The McGooley series was filmed in monochrome. Location and filmed insert sequences were supplied by Artransa Park Film Studios. The flute and accordion duet composed for the theme tune was by Tommy Tycho, who had also worked on The Mavis Bramston Show.

The programme debuted in Melbourne on HSV7 on 1 September 1966 with the episode 'The New House' and in country Victoria in the same month, with the first show screening on AMV4 Albury on Wednesday the 14th and BTV6 Ballarat and BCV8 Bendigo on Friday 16th, before the Seven network screened it in Sydney the following month.

== Spin-offs ==
The series had a three-season run of 88 episodes under the McGooley title. In 1968, the old McGooley house is demolished and the Stillers must move out. Chater left the show and the remaining cast was spun off into a new series titled Rita and Wally which ran for a single season of 23 episodes.

In 1976 the series was briefly resurrected as a radio comedy. Chater, Farr and Meillon returned and once again the show was set at 17 Karang Road. Stewart Ginn having died, the part of Nancarrow was played by Max Osbiston. Fay Kelton took over the part of Possum from Noeline Brown.

== Filming ==
The program was made on videotape but, as was common at the time, the videotape masters were wiped and re-used. 16mm film copies of the complete series, created for affiliates that couldn't broadcast it alongside the rest of the network, as well as for sale to foreign countries such as Britain (where the program was shown on Yorkshire ITV, Grampian and Ulster television in 1968-9) were donated to the National Film and Sound Archive.

== Cast ==
=== Main ===
- Gordon Chater as Dominic McGooley
- John Meillon as Wally Stiller
- Judi Farr as Rita Stiller
- Noeline Brown as Rosemary 'Possum' Urkens
- Stewart Ginn as Peregrine Nancarrow
- Robert McDarra as Donk Rogers

=== Guests ===
- Ben Gabriel (1 episode)
- Deryck Barnes as Royston (1 episode)
- Edward Howell as Stallybrass (1 episode)
- Eve Wynne as Mrs Clayton (1 episode)
- Frank Taylor as Vile (3 episodes)
- Janne Coghlan as Molly Rogers (7 episodes)
- Jennifer Hagan (2 episodes)
- Ken Goodlet (1 episode)
- Kit Taylor (1 episode)
- Les Foxcroft (1 episode)
- Lou Vernon as Merv Sneddon (1 episode)
- Queenie Ashton as Miss Fitchett (1 episode)
- Redmond Phillips (1 episode)
- Tony Bonner as Party Bloke (1 episode)

== Legacy ==
The program was rated number 24 in a 2005 television special, 50 Years 50 Shows, which counted down Australia's greatest television programs.

== See also ==
- List of Australian television series
