= Go Big =

2004 film

- Directed by: Tony Tilse
- Written by: Ellie Beaumont; Michael Miller
- Produced by: Ellie Beaumont; Rosemary Blight; Michael Miller
- Starring: Justine Clarke; Tom Long; Leon Ford
- Cinematography: Mark Wareham
- Edited by: Henry Dangar
- Music by: Daniel Denholm
- Release date: 2004
- Running time: 110 minutes
- Country: Australia
- Language: English

Go Big is a 2004 Australian TV film starring Justine Clarke, Tom Long and Leon Ford.

== Plot ==
After getting fired Gina teams up with two conmen.

== Cast ==
- Justine Clarke as Gina Katz
- Tom Long as Ethan Foster
- Alex Dimitriades as Hamish Fitz-Herbert
- Leon Ford as Lars Foster
- Kimberley Joseph as Sophie Duvet
- Sacha Horler as Michaela Twinch
- Geoff Morrell as Ian Patterson
- Tony Barry as Bryan Katz
- Judi Farr as Marion Katz
- Ling-Hsueh Tang as Lisa Katz

== Production ==
Go Big was created by the team behind Love Is A Four Letter Word and production began in June 2003. Shot in Sydney over 20 days, locations included Piermont, Sydney Harbour and Anzac bridges.

== Reception ==
Go Big was Ten's top rating Australian show but fell outside the top twenty.

Tony Johnson of the Herald Sun gave it a mixed review saying it "starts out cheeky and amusing enough, but soon drifts into predictable territory." The Sydney Morning Herald's Doug Anderson wrote "This is an effervescent caper comedy which runs like a Gatling gun through the old boy network and the A-list, targeting the sharks and grubs of the market at their own game, using vanity as a weapon of mass deception and the kiss of a chameleon not to mention a frog." Writing in the Age Debi Enker states "Go Big is an appealing caper-flick with a romantic heart."

== Awards ==
- 2004 AFI Awards
  - Best Mini-Series or Telefeature - nominated
