= Demonstrator (film) =

- Directed by: Warwick Freeman
- Written by: Kit Denton
- Based on: novel by Elizabeth and Don Campbell
- Produced by: James Fishburn; David Brice
- Starring: Joe James
- Cinematography: John McLean
- Edited by: Anthony Buckley
- Music by: Bob Young
- Production companies: Freeman-Fishburn International; Act One Productions
- Distributed by: Columbia Pictures
- Release date: 8 April 1971
- Running time: 110 mins
- Country: Australia
- Language: English
- Budget: $300,000

Demonstrator is a 1971 film directed by Warwick Freeman.

== Plot ==
Joe Slater, the Australian Defence Minister, has organised an Asian security conferred in Canberra. His son Steven, who is in love with his father's secretary, organises a protest by university students against the conference. Steven is beaten up, loses his girlfriend and sees the demonstration overtaken by professional agitators.

== Cast ==
- Joe James as Joe Slater
- Irene Inescort as Marion Slater
- Gerry Maguire as Steven Slater
- Wendy Lingham as Sarah Wainwright
- Kenneth Tsang as Thao Kimalayao
- Michael Long as Hugh Prentiss
- Harold Hopkins as Malcolm
- Elizabeth Hall as Beth
- Kerry Dwyer as Robin
- Slim De Grey as Prime Minister
- Stewart Ginn as Superintendent Ackland
- Ken Goodlet as Inspector Graham
- Noel Ferrier as Governor-General
- Alastair Duncan as Ted Pacard
- Eric Oldfield as Driver (uncredited)
- Michael Aitkens as Haler, Youth

== Production ==
David Brice, a newsreader with CTC7 in Canberra, optioned a book by Don and Elizabeth Coleman. He met some ACT solicitors to raise funding and approached experienced TV producers Warwick Freeman and Jim Fishburn. They formed Act One (The Fund) and commissioned FFI (Freeman Fishburn International) to make the movie.

The film began shooting in September 1970 on location in Canberra. The only imported actor was Kenneth Tsang from Hong Kong. Students from the Australian National University appeared as extras and Prime Minister John Gorton told government departments to assist wherever possible, provided no direct expenditure was made. Freeman says that during filming he realised there was not enough money to complete the film so he had to go around in the evenings raising further funds from locals:

We finished it on budget, or under, and on time. But the relationship with Act One became strained. What was I directing? A great story? Actors? The performances? A drama of the times? I don't really remember. We were all new to it and the job was functional. Get it shot, in the can, and make it audience friendly. I do remember ensuring that all the screen requirements for movies of the day were intact. The car chase, the sex scene, the nudity... and of course the music themes.... We were naive. The approach to enticing great performances from actors, or the passionate need to tell an important story was not an underlying rationale. None of the parameters of current day movie-making prevailed. I don't really remember the driving force except for that of the Aussie film industry's need for a serious contemporary picture...we tried for that.

Noel Ferrier called it "an odd little beauty" with "the most boring nude love scene ever filmed" and felt the performances of himself and Slim de Grey "were unintentionally hysterical."

== Reception ==
The film achieved some success in Canberra but was a commercial and critical disappointment. David Stratton wrote:

The film takes an expectedly establishment attitude towards all those naughty students demonstrating against the wise government, but also tries to appeal to the young audiences by including a poolside orgy, a frank, naked love scene and a series of car crashes... the most exciting thing about the film was the distributor Columbia's frenzied publicity campaign.
