= The Mavis Bramston Show =

Australian TV sketch comedy series

- Genre: Sketch comedy revue
- Created by: Carol Raye
- Written by: Carol Raye; David Sale; Barbara Angell; Nan Witcomb; Jon Finlayson
- Directed by: David Cahill; Hugh Taylor; Ron Way
- Starring: Maggie Dence; Gordon Chater; Carol Raye; Barry Creyton; Ronnie Stevens; Miriam Karlin; Reg Livermore; Hazel Phillips; Noeline Brown; Barbara Angell; June Salter; Judi Farr; Johnny Lockwood; Andonia Katsaros; Ron Frazer
- Country of origin: Australia
- Original language: English

Production
- Producers: Carol Raye; Michael Plant
- Running time: 30 minutes

Original release
- Network: Seven Network
- Release: 1964 – 1968

The Mavis Bramston Show was an Australian television satirical sketch comedy revue series that aired on the Seven Network from 1964 to 1968. Mavis was created, written, and co-produced by Carol Raye, who also starred in it and was inspired by the British TV satirical revue TV shows of the period, most notably That Was the Week That Was and Not Only... But Also.

The series was the first successful venture in this genre on Australian television. At its peak it was one of the most popular, albeit controversial, Australian TV programs of its time and it propelled many of the "classic" cast to national stardom, including its three original stars: Raye (who was already a major star in England as a film star), British expatriate comedian Gordon Chater, and Barry Creyton, as well as the series mascot portrayed by Maggie Dence.

== Cultural impact ==
The Mavis Bramston Show had a huge impact in Australia in the mid-1960s, heightened because of its unique place in the history of the Australian television industry. Australian television broadcasting since its inception in 1956 had rapidly become dominated by the socio-economic influence of the United States, and according to "The Vincent Report" in 1963 on the Australian media industry, it found that 97% of drama broadcast locally between 1956 and 1963 was produced in the US.

At least 80% of Australian TV programming by the early 1960s was sourced from the United States, and American TV series were consistently listed amongst the top-rated shows.

The few programmes that were made locally were usually low-cost copies of either proven American talk-variety or quiz show formats.

The absence of government-mandated local content regulations meant Australian TV producers faced enormous challenges in trying to compete against imported American (and to a lesser extent British) programs, which benefited from high budgets, an international talent pool, and huge economies of scale, thanks to their large domestic audiences and established worldwide distribution networks. These advantages were further enhanced by the fact that American producers and networks offered Australian channels attractive discount rates on bundled programming.

Despite the overwhelming dominance of imported programming, local production gradually increased in the mid-1960s for several reasons—the licensing of a third network in major cities (which ultimately became Network 10), the introduction of videotape technology (which permitted pre-recording and editing, and reduced production costs) and the enforcement of local production quotas on TV advertising, which helped to foster a local skill-base.

== Mavis Bramston ==
Mavis Bramston debuted only months after Crawford Productions landmark police procedural drama Homicide. Bramston demonstrated both that it was possible to make satirical TV comedy in Australia, featuring Australian issues and characters, and that there was a significant audience for such a show. As the first Australian-produced TV comedy series to become a national success with both critics and viewers alike, it is therefore considered a milestone in the development of Australian television. Many at the time expected that this honour would go to Graham Kennedy's variety series In Melbourne Tonight, which, although hugely popular in its home city, did not become a fully-fledged national hit until 1969. Writer Hugh Stuckey opined that this was in part because IMT faced strong competition from the shows it followed, the top-rating American variety series The Perry Como Show and The Andy Williams Show.

Mavis Bramston grew out of the recent local theatrical tradition of topical satirical revue—most notably the popular revues staged at Sydney's Phillip Street Theatre in the 1950s and 1960s — but it was also strongly influenced by the British satire boom and especially by the contemporary British TV satirical comedy series That Was the Week That Was and Not Only... But Also.

== Cast members ==
=== The character of Mavis Bramston ===
The in-joke of the series was that the title character "face" and mascot of the series only ever appeared in the opening credits; however, she would tour as the character making public appearances.

Face	Tenure
Maggie Dence (AM)	Dence was officially the character of "Mavis", but she did not appear in the first five episodes. A noted stage performer, she would later go on to appear in sitcom Kingswood Country and in numerous dramatic roles in soap opera/series.
Noeline Brown (OAM)	Brown was the original face and mascot of the series, but left the role to work in England. Upon returning to Australia however, Brown became a regular performer on the show.

=== Original cast ===
Note: The cast was made up of the three regular stars and had a regular rotating guest line-up

Actor	Tenure	Notes	Ref
Carol Raye (AM)	1964—1965, 1967, 1968	British-born dancer, singer, and film star, who after working in Kenya and then emigrating to Australia, appeared in theatre. Ray devised the series, wrote and produced the pilot, and was one of the regular screenwriters and co-producer alongside Michael Plant. She worked on the show alongside David Sale, Nan Whitcomb, and Barbara Angell, and was an original cast member alongside expat British-performer Gordon Chater and newcomer Barry Creyton. She would later feature in the series Number 96, written by Sale.	
Gordon Chater (AM)	1964—65 (original cast member)	Chater was a British-born actor and comedian who migrated from England to Australia in the late 1940s, and was a prominent star in both theatre and radio. He went on to appear in the equally successful My Name's McGooley and was awarded the Gold Logie. The series also featured his future McGooley co-star Judi Farr.	
Barry Creyton	1964—66	Australian-born actor, singer, and writer, who came to prominence in theatre, most notably at The Phillip Street Theatre in revue and The Music Hall Theatre Restaurant.	

=== Notable cast ===
Name	Tenure	Notes
Reg Livermore (AO)		
Hazel Phillips (OAM)	1965—1968	
Miriam Karlin	1965	Replaced original star Carol Raye
Ronnie Stevens	1965—1966	British actor, replaced original star Gordon Chater
Barbara Angell	1966—1968	Angell also worked as a screenwriter on the series and commonly used the pen name Angela Barr
Andonia Katsoras	1966—1968	
Judi Farr	1965	Various characters
June Salter	1965—1967	Appeared in pilot
Johnny Lockwood		Actor and comedian
Ron Frazer	1966—1967	Actor and comedian

=== Other cast and guests ===
The Mavis cast, which changed considerably over its three-year run, initially featured many imported or expatriate British performers alongside experienced Australian actors such as John Bluthal who was becoming well known in Britain, and Australian performers who were relative newcomers to TV but who, between them however, had decades of experience in theatre, cabaret and revue and music.

During its three-year run, other regular cast members and guests included singer Bryan Davies (1964), comic and (wife of Bobby Limb) Dawn Lake, as well as Neva Carr Glyn (1966), June Thody (1966) and Peter Reeves (1967) Barbara Wyndon and Al Thomas guest starred in some episodes.

Among the crew was a young production assistant, Peter Weir, who went on to become one of Australia's best-known and most successful film directors.

== Show's title ==
There are several versions of the source of the ironic joke behind the show's title. The most frequently quoted account is that it derived from an Australian theatrical expression. The nickname "Mavis Bramstons" mocked a phenomenon common at that time on the Australian stage. In the years after World War II, overseas actors (many of whom who were considered second-rate or well past their best) were often imported to star in local productions, even though there were local performers available who were as good or better than their overseas counterparts. One of the most famous examples of this trend was the "discovery" of actress and singer Jill Perryman; while understudying the much-loved Evie Hayes for the lead role in a 1953 production of the musical Call Me Madam, Perryman was able to make her critical breakthrough after Evie Hayes was sidelined by illness. Hayes and Perryman became great friends. Hayes later appeared as Perryman's mother in Funny Girl.

The stock persona of an imported second-rate actress became the central conceit of the series. The opening scene of each episode showed "Mavis", now brought to life as a parodic character, arriving at Sydney airport to be greeted by the waiting press; the irony was that although the show was called The Mavis Bramston Show, this was the only scene in which she appeared. Noeline Brown played the eponymous Mavis in the pilot and the first five shows.

Maggie Dence, however became the "face" of the series; she regularly featured in press articles and on magazine covers and was widely employed by the show's sponsor, Ampol, making well-attended promotional appearances all over the country.

== Creation and development ==
The show's creator and original co-star, Carol Raye, had enjoyed considerable success in the UK as an actor, singer and dancer, followed by a stint working for the national TV service in Kenya (where her husband worked for the Colonial Veterinary Service). In 1964 the couple had decided to emigrate to Australia, arriving in March of that year. Raye had asked friends in Britain for contacts in the Australian TV industry and this led to a meeting with (Sir) Charles Moses, then the General Manager of the ABC. He suggested that she should try her luck with Sydney commercial station ATN-7 and gave her a letter of introduction to Seven's general manager, James Oswin. That meeting was successful and Raye became one of the first female TV executives in Australia—she was appointed as Oswin's assistant in "Matters of Live Programming" and was given an office and a brief to watch local television and come up with ideas for new programs.

Inspired by the BBC's That Was the Week That Was, Raye suggested a show based on TW3's format of topical satire, and although initially skeptical, Oswin agreed and allocated a budget of AU£1500 for pilot episode. Raye then set about recruiting performers to fill the roles of TW3's stars Millicent Martin, Bernard Levin and David Frost. By chance, she had also been given an introduction to Gordon Chater, who immediately accepted her offer on the expectation that the new show would be a TV version of the famous Phillip St Revues, in which he had been starring.

During this period, Raye was also drafted in to help develop a show to be sponsored by the Bradmill textile company, and she was taken to The Music Hall at Neutral Bay, a popular theatre-restaurant presenting Victorian-style comedy-melodramas that featured considerable audience interaction. The show Raye saw that evening, The Evil That Men Do, co-starred the Music Hall's resident Villain and Villainess, Barry Creyton and Noeline Brown. Raye was impressed with Creyton's looks, his urbane style and his skills in handling the often rowdy Music Hall audiences, and immediately knew she had found her second co-star. Soon after this, Noeline Brown met the show's co-producer, Michael Plant at a party and he offered her the part of Mavis in the pilot episode.

To develop the script, Raye hired a team of writers including James Fishburn (who also acted as Executive Producer), John Mackellar, David Sale (who went on to write for the hugely popular 1970s soap opera Number 96), actor-writer Jon Finlayson (who had written a successful intimate revue in Melbourne with Barbara Angell), Melvyn Morrow (a writer of revues and later Director of Drama at Stonyhurst College and writer of A Song to Sing, O) and Ken Shadie, who had begun writing comedy sketches while working in Seven's engineering department; he also later wrote for Number 96 and co-wrote the script of the hit Paul Hogan film Crocodile Dundee.

At this stage Raye was intending to work only as the show's producer, and she still needed to find a female lead; Chater suggested June Salter (who agreed to a guest appearance in the pilot) and they also approached Judi Farr and several other actresses, but all were tied up with other work and could not commit to the lead role. Chater finally suggested that Raye should do the pilot herself, for fear that Seven would lose interest in the show and cancel, and although she was not keen to perform and co-produce, Raye agreed to do it.

== Pilot episode and early shows, 1964 ==
The production team needed to find a proper name for the new show (its working title was The Late Show) and, as noted above, the final choice was inspired by their desire to satirise the cultural cringe that prevailed in Australian theatre.

The name "Mavis Bramston" was suggested by Jon Finlayson, who cited an old Melbourne theatre tradition in which "an actress who's really daggy or over the top, or up herself" was nicknamed a "Mavis Bramston". With this in mind, they came up with the idea of having a purported actress from England who is ostensibly brought in to star in the show, but in fact makes only a brief appearance.

During rehearsals it was decided that the show would open with Barry Creyton's song "Togetherness", which he had originally written for a Phillip St revue called At It Again; there were also topical songs with lyrics by David Sale and music by Seven's resident musical director Tommy Tycho. It was filmed at the Macquarie Theatrette in Pitt Street, Sydney with Raye, Chater, Creyton, Brown and a guest appearance by June Salter.

The show opened with a heavily made-up Noeline Brown (as Mavis) in a mock interview with Jon Finlayson after which she performed a (deliberately awful) song-and-dance routine. The sketches included topical items about then Prime Minister Robert Menzies and the Voyager disaster; Oz co-editor Richard Walsh provided an "Oz News" segment; Gordon Chater performed his popular slapstick routine, in which he performed a comic monologue while covering himself with food then squirting the resulting mess off with a soda siphon; there was also a serious interlude with a reading of a poem written by Kath Walker, later known as Oodgeroo Noonuccal. The show concluded with the cast singing "Friends and Neighbours" off-camera, while footage of mob violence, war scenes and Ku Klux Klan rallies was played on screen.

The appearance of Richard Walsh is notable because it established an explicit link between Mavis and the Sydney satirical magazine Oz, which at that time was the subject of a highly publicized censorship controversy. The three Oz co-editors—Walsh, Richard Neville and Martin Sharp – had recently been charged with producing an obscene publication, relating to satirical articles and photographs published in the magazine's early editions. In September 1964 the trio was found guilty of the obscenity charges, and there was a major public outcry when presiding magistrate Gerald Locke SM sentenced Walsh and Neville to six months' imprisonment with hard labour. When Mavis premiered the "Oz Three" were preparing their appeal against the verdict (which was ultimately quashed).

The Oz-Mavis connection was reinforced on 15 November, four days after the pilot aired, when the Mavis stars appeared at the Sydney University Theatre as part of a benefit to raise money for the Oz defence appeal. They performed a parody song entitled "Poof The Tragic Queen", which sent up the folk-song staple "Puff, the Magic Dragon". The benefit also featured radical Sydney proto-punk band The Missing Links and Homicide star Leonard Teale, who recited a "surfie" parody of Banjo Paterson's Clancy of the Overflow.

The Mavis pilot was broadcast on ATN-7 (in Sydney only) on 11 November 1964 and it was an immediate success, with the Sydney Sun newspaper praising it as "... a fresh new show" that brought "authentic, biting, saucy, swinging satire to ATN". The film recording of the pilot episode survived and is now preserved in the collection of the National Film and Sound Archive in Canberra.

Seven soon announced that they were commissioning a series, which was mostly directed by David Cahill and Hugh Taylor. It was evident that the chemistry between the three stars was a crucial factor in its success, so Seven insisted that Raye should continue as co-star, whereas she had hoped to find a permanent female lead to replace her, so she could concentrate on production; as a compromise, Seven agreed to ease her workload by appointing Michael Plant as co-producer.

Five more episodes were made during late 1964, but these were screened in Sydney and Canberra only; the Collection database of the National Film and Sound Archive suggests that only three of these first six episodes have survived.

Noeline Brown made a brief weekly appearance as Mavis in these first shows, but she soon tired of the one-joke role and was reluctant to take on the promotional duties required. Seven wanted to retain her, but Brown intended to go to England and, since Seven had neglected to sign her to a contract, she left the show, to be replaced by actress Maggie Dence, although Brown returned to the series after her visit to the UK.

== National breakthrough, 1965 ==
Mavis was an immediate success in New South Wales and this was replicated when it was broadcast nationally from early 1965. It created a media sensation and at its peak it became the highest-rating Australian TV series ever made up to that time, pulling in unprecedented 59% of the viewing audience. Capping its ratings success, the series won the 1965 Logie Award for "Best New Show".

The popularity of The Mavis Bramston Show quickly became the stuff of legend – it is said that Qantas pilots tried to re-arrange their schedules to be home on Wednesdays for the weekly broadcast, and in the national capital Canberra local businesses reputedly contacted Seven, asking them to reschedule the show, because it clashed with late-night shopping and revenues were falling as a result of its popularity. Around 45 episodes were produced during 1965; fortunately the majority have survived and these are now archived in the NFSA collection.

Mavis almost immediately attracted controversy, but this only served to heighten its notoriety. Some local stations censored 'blasphemous' words and the term "kin oath" (a contraction of the Australian expletive "fuckin' oath") and in March 1965 Sydney Catholic clergyman Bishop Thomas Muldoon publicly announced that he intended to sell his shares in Ampol because it sponsored such an 'immoral' show. When one of the stars was quizzed by the press about the furore, they expressed surprise that a bishop would own shares, but this immediately generated more banner headlines declaring "Actor insults Bishop". According to Noeline Brown it was Barry Creyton who made the remark but another source quotes Gordon Chater as saying that he made the comment.

When the show went national Carol Raye quickly found that juggling performance and production with the demands of raising a young family were becoming too much, so Seven agreed to recruit a co-producer; on Gordon Chater's suggestion they hired Michael Plant, who had started out writing scripts for radio star Grace Gibson before moving to Los Angeles, where he worked in film and TV. He was also an experienced journalist, which assisted with the topical nature of the show's humour.

Despite the addition of a co-producer, Raye was soon exhausted by the frantic pace and she left the series midway through 1965. At this stage Seven still felt it necessary to import talent from the UK, and her place was taken by British TV star Miriam Karlin, who was well known for her role as the gravel-voiced, chain-smoking shop steward in the popular BBC sitcom The Rag Trade. In 1966, when Chater departed, Seven brought in British actor-comedian Ronnie Stevens.

Although the show continued to top the ratings, it was dealt another unexpected blow in late 1965 with the sudden death of Michael Plant (from an accidental overdose of sleeping tablets). He was replaced by Peter Myers, who had previously worked as a writer of intimate revues in London.

During 1965–66 the focus of the sketches gradually shifted from topical political humour to broader social satire and more conventional revue-style material. Popular sketches included Chater's famous "Pie Eater" routine, in which he played a stereotypical Ocker character in a singlet and handkerchief hat, who crams pies into his mouth while extolling the virtues of the "June Dilly-Potkins School of Charm" (a joke on the real-life deportment schools founded by former model June Dally-Watkins). Another recurring sketch was devised by and featured Miriam Karlin who, with Gordon Chater, played an elderly couple who sit on a park bench and talk to each other without communicating.

During 1965 the cast of local performers expanded, with regular appearances by James Kenney, June Salter and Hazel Phillips. Phillips, like Raye, had started out as a juvenile performer in her native Britain and got her break on Australian TV as one of the panelists on the popular 1960s talk show Beauty and the Beast, hosted by Eric Baume. Interviewed in 2007, she recalled her stint on the Bramston show:

The Mavis Bramston Show was really interesting because you got to play something different every week. I did my impressions. I did Marlene and I did Marilyn ... it was such an original show at the time. And because it was all satirical and it was about the political scene of the time. I played the part of a schoolgirl every week to Barry Creyton's father and said, 'Daddy, why does the Prime Minister do so-and-so?' And he'd explain, you know. It would be that sort of stuff.

At the end of the year Gordon Chater announced that he was leaving the series. To replace him, the cast was augmented by imported British actor Ronnie Stevens and Australian actor-comedian Ron Frazer, who soon became a national star himself. Chater was subsequently recruited for a new comedy series, My Name's McGooley, What's Yours? which premiered in February 1967 and quickly became the most popular and successful Australian sitcom of the era.

== 1966–68 ==
Despite the changes, the popularity of Mavis remained high through 1966 and it won three Logie awards that year – "Best Live Show", "Best Female Personality" (Carol Raye) and the Gold Logie for "Most Popular Personality on Australian Television" (Chater). Hugh Taylor succeeded Ron Way as director and the regular cast now comprised Creyton, Frazer, June Thody, Neva Carr Glyn and Noeline Brown (recently returned from her stint in the UK), with guest appearances by Stuart Wagstaff, Arlene Dorgan, pop singer Bryan Davies and Penny Ramsey.

Like Chater before him, Mavis made Ron Frazer a national TV star. One of his most popular roles was as a stereotypical Australian working-class character called "Ocker", and Frazer is now credited with popularising the term. He was also well known for his 'camp' character, whose regular catchphrase "my second-best friend" also gained wide currency at the time.

Mavis continued to generate controversy into 1966. On 12 February The Age reported that the Broadcasting Control Board was to investigate a sketch on that week's show which sent up the recent retirement announcement by Prime Minister Robert Menzies. The sketch featured members of the cast asking questions that "put a humorous and false slant" on answers Menzies gave to reporters' questions at his farewell press conference. The Age item concluded with a comment from HSV-7's manager, Mr K. Cairns, who maintained that the sketch "in no way held Sir Robert up to ridicule", and stated that he had seen it himself and found it "extremely funny".

Barry Creyton left the series at the end of 1966 and went on to host his own short-lived variety series, The Barry Creyton Show, in Melbourne. In later years he worked extensively in theatre and revue.

There is very little extant information about the 1967 series and, as noted below, it is believed that most if not all the tapes of these shows are now lost.

By 1968, with all the original stars gone, ratings were declining. It was at this point, after 18 months of writing for the show and making occasional guest appearances, that Barbara Angell was finally given a major role, jointly headlining the show with Ron Frazer. She threw herself into the task, reading every newspaper every day, with the plan of writing at least one topical song and two sketches every week and according to her, they managed to reverse the ratings slide:

When Ron Frazer and I took over, we actually got the ratings up again. Because we worked terribly well together. We'd gone past the stage of the channel being convinced they had to bring in somebody from overseas because we weren't strong enough people to carry the show ourselves.

Angell also featured in one of the last events in the career of British comedian Tony Hancock. Hancock's career had declined since his ill-advised 1961 split with longtime writing team Ray Galton and Alan Simpson (a move Hancock himself had later described as "professional suicide"). He was becoming increasingly affected by drugs and alcohol, as evidenced by his shambolic stage appearances in Melbourne in October 1967; at the time of his Australian visit he was in the process of divorcing his second wife.

Nevertheless, he was still a major star, and in March 1968 Seven brought him to Australia to star in a locally made series, Hancock Down Under. To help publicise the project, the station arranged for him to make a guest appearance on Mavis and Angell was chosen to appear with him because, she later recalled, "they had wanted someone who was not easily throwable, because he was terribly easily throwable and very unsure of himself".

On the day of the taping, Angell spent the morning at his hotel going through the sketch with Hancock, trying to reassure and relax him, then she left for the studio. Hancock arrived at the studio during rehearsals, but when it came time for his final camera rehearsal, he had disappeared and he remained missing for four days; in the event he had to be hastily replaced by actor Johnny Lockwood. Several months after his aborted Mavis appearance, Hancock took his own life in his Sydney apartment.

The Mavis Bramston Show was cancelled during 1968 and replaced by a short-lived variety revue show called Anything Goes.

In 1971 Seven produced a one-hour reunion special, Mavis's Back, which brought together many of the original cast including Chater, Frazer, Salter and Lockwood

== Awards ==
The show and its cast won the following Logie Awards:

Year	Award	Category	Nominee(s)	Result	Ref.
1965	Logie Awards	Best New Show	The Mavis Bramston Show	Won	
1966	Logie Awards	Best Live Show	The Mavis Bramston Show	Won	
1966	Logie Awards	Gold Logie	Gordon Chater	Won	
1966	Logie Awards	Best Female Personality	Carol Raye	Won	

== Preservation ==
Unlike many contemporary Australian TV shows, a significant portion of The Mavis Bramston Show has survived to the present. The collection database of the National Film and Sound Archive in Canberra indicates that the Archive holds copies of most of the episodes made between 1964 and 1966. However the database shows no copies of any program from the 1967 series, which are presumably now lost and only compilations of highlights from the 1968 series, suggesting that the full original program tapes from that series are also lost.

These losses might be explained by contemporary changes in Australian broadcasting and production practices. The 1964–66 episodes of Mavis were evidently broadcast live and most survive on 16mm film, since it was the practice in the early 1960s for the major commercial channels in Sydney and Melbourne to record telecine film transfers of these shows for distribution to regional and interstate TV stations. By 1967, however, most independent producers and Australian TV stations were using videotape but (as in the UK and the USA) a high proportion of videotaped Australian programming from the 1960s and 1970s was subsequently erased or otherwise disposed of.

== See also ==
- List of Australian television series
