= Rachael Coopes =

Australian actress

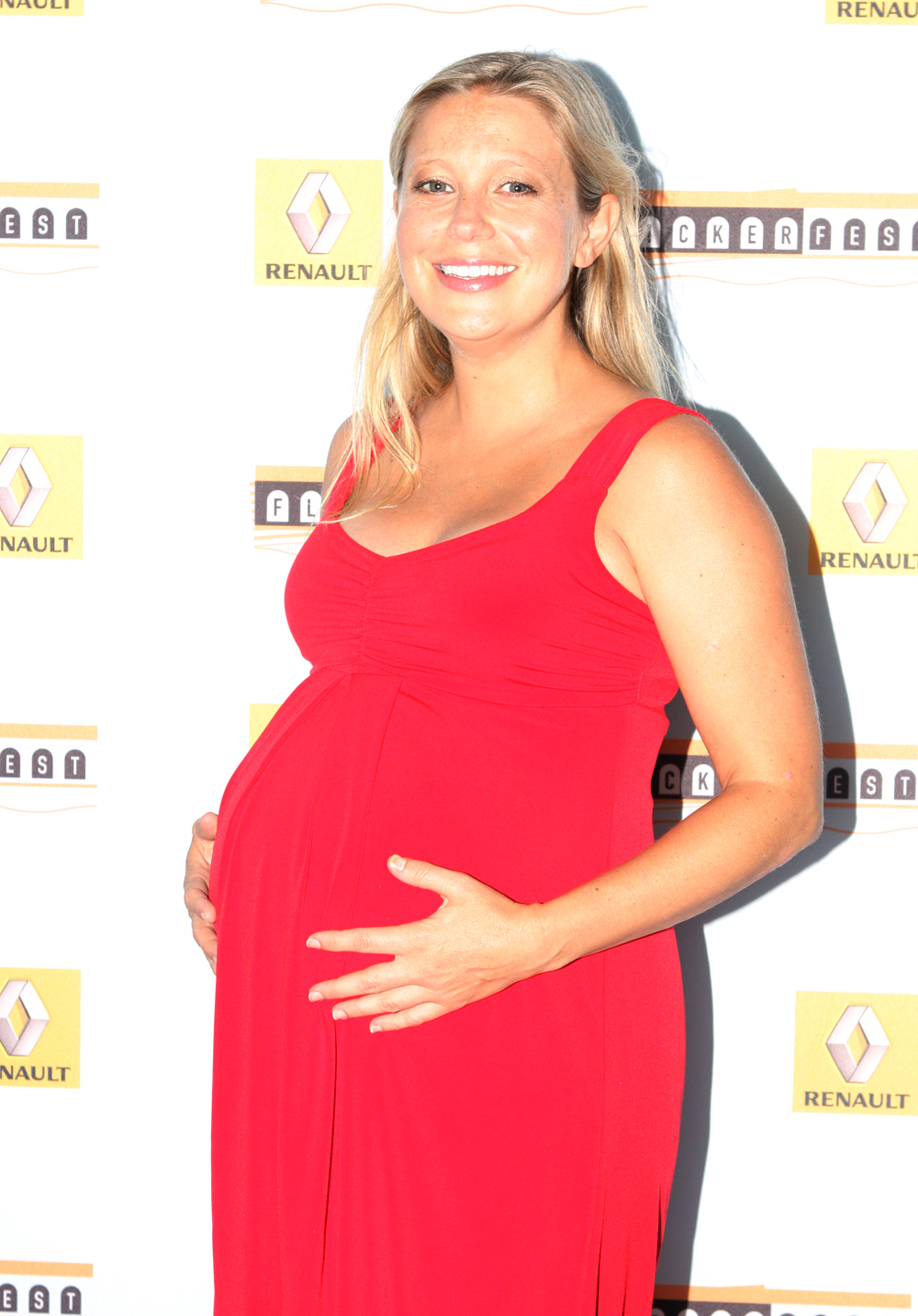
- Rachael Coopes at Flickerfest Short Film Festival
- Awards: Marten Bequest Award for Excellence in Acting; Ian Potter Cultural Trust, Grant

Rachael Coopes (sometimes credited as Rachel Coopes) is an Australian actress, best known for her character Sigourney in the SBS cult parody series Life Support. After starring in her first acting role as Max Cullen's daughter in the Australian film Billy's Holiday for which she received positive reviews despite the film getting a mixed response, she went on to complete a Bachelor of Economics at the University of Sydney.

== Biography ==
Coopes has appeared as a guest actor in various television series including White Collar Blue and The Secret Life of Us. She was a series regular in the ABC comedy Dog's Head Bay and a semi-regular in All Saints. After completing the third series of Life Support in 2004, she was awarded the Marten Bequest Travelling Scholarship and the Ian Potter Cultural Trust to study in Paris with Philippe Gaulier, the mentor and teacher of Sacha Baron Cohen.

She returned in 2007 and appeared in the final series of McLeod's Daughters as Ingrid Marr.

In 2009, Coopes hosted Money Box webisodes for UBank.

Coopes' first play, Art House was produced by award-winning Tangram Theatre Company in July and August 2009, previewing in London at the Old Red Lion Theatre and then Zoo Venue at the Edinburgh Festival Fringe. In 2011, she played the character "Flatmate Wanted" in Balls of Steel Australia.

Coopes appeared on Dance Academy, as a drama teacher, and is currently a regular presenter of the ABC's Play School.

In her early years, Coopes trained with the Australian Theatre for Young People in Sydney. She has been teaching at ATYP since her return to Australia.

In April 2025 Rachael Coopes released the book The Art of Forgiveness: Let go, find peace.
