= Life Support (Australian TV series) =

- Genre: Comedy
- Written by: Jeremy Adair; Kevin Brumpton
- Directed by: John Eastway; David McDonald
- Starring: Rachael Coopes; Brendan Cowell; Simon Van Der Stap; Alison Barnes; Duncan Fellows; Abbie Cornish; Jack Finsterer
- Country of origin: Australia
- Original language: English
- No. of seasons: 3

Production
- Running time: 30 minutes
- Production company: McDonald Eastway

Original release
- Network: SBS
- Release: 27 August 2001

Life Support was a comedy programme on Australia's SBS network which satirised lifestyle television programs. It ran for three seasons. On Australia Day 2006, a Life Support Marathon was shown on the Comedy Channel showing the first series and half of the second.

== Concept ==
A satirical, sometimes dark look at Australian life as seen through the omnipresent lens of the Television Lifestyle Show. The series' lifestyle experts included Sigourney, a home economics guru who always wore a fresh frock and was a firm believer in the doctrine of "pleasing your man"; Todd, a DIY expert; Rudi, a South African general practitioner; and young person Penne.

Much of the show's humour derived from political incorrectness and black humour. For example: Penne explains that roadside tributes are an ideal place to get fresh flowers; Dr Rudi endorses fattening up one's daughter to prevent boys from wanting to have sex with her because "It's better to have a fatty boombah in the family than a filthy slut"; Sigourney recommends that if you have a bad haircut, shave your head and tell your friends that you have had chemotherapy.

One feature of the series were voxpop interviews with real people about topics raised in the show, which often supported the stereotypes and attitudes voiced by the characters.

== Characters ==
- Penne - an independent, often aggressive, stereotypical university student-style young woman, always trying to find a way to make quick money and make life easier for overwhelmed young adults. Played by Abbie Cornish (season 1) and Alison Barnes (seasons 2-3).
- Sigourney - a ditzy blond young woman and stereotype from the North Shore of Sydney whose segments were dedicated to the art of landing a wealthy husband. Played by Rachael Coopes.
- Todd - a parody of 'do it yourself' home-handymen blokes. Played by Brendan Cowell (seasons 1-2) and Duncan Fellows (season 3).
- Dr Rudi - an amoral South African doctor with a strong Afrikaner accent, who is a parody of doctors found in the Eastern Suburbs of Sydney. His catchphrase is "Howzit, Dr Rrrrudi here". Played by Simon Van Der Stap (seasons 1-3) and Jack Finsterer (season 3).

== Dr Rudi vs Dr Rudi ==
Throughout the third series, there were various hints that the new Dr Rudi, who was explained as having surgery, was actually an imposter. During the usual letter time, instead of answering mail, they would instead continue the plot that the old Dr Rudi was out for revenge, and to get his life back. During the final scene of the last episode of the series, Sigourney and Dr Rudi's (Jack Finsterer) wedding was taking place, and from behind the bushes came the original Dr Rudi (Simon Van Der Stap) to try to end the wedding. The pair got into an argument over which Dr Rudi Sigourney would marry, and they started a fist fight. This led to the closing credits. As no episodes of Life Support have been made since, this plot has never been resolved.

== DVD release ==
All 3 series of Life Support have been released on DVD.
