= Ralph Peterson (writer) =

Australian writer (1921–1996)

- Born: Ralph Wilton Peterson; 21 February 1921; Adelaide, Australia
- Died: 2 November 1996 (aged 75)
- Occupations: Playwright; screenwriter; novelist; dramatist; actor; radio producer; stage and screen producer
- Spouse: Betty Lucas (m 1946-)

Ralph Wilton Peterson (21 February 1921 – 2 November 1996) was an Australian writer (dramatist and playwright), actor and producer of film, theatre, radio and TV. He went to London and achieved fame with the success of his play The Square Ring, which was turned into a film of the same name in 1953. He married the Australian actress Betty Lucas in 1946; their son, Joel Patterson (1957–2017), became a cinematographer.

== Biography ==
Peterson was born in Adelaide, the only son of Ralph A. and Daphne (née Coulter) Peterson, and became involved in theatre and journalism in his teens. He got work on radio playing one of the students on the show Yes, What? (1937–41) which became very popular. Peterson started writing episodes. When the show ended Peterson moved to Sydney and worked as an announcer on 2UE before joining the army.

He served as an artillery officer and in the First Australian Broadcasting Control Unit. He appeared in plays at the Metropolitan Theatre and the Independent Theatre, including the original production of Rusty Bugles.

After the war, Peterson began writing regularly for Sydney radio including comedy material for Roy Rene, Jack Davey and Dick Bentley. He wrote a comedy serial for him and his wife Betty Lucas, Ralph and Betty (1947).

A radio feature about an Aboriginal child, The Problem of Johnny Flourcake (1950) was narrated by Anthony Quayle who recommended Peterson to the BBC. Peterson moved to London in 1951, writing scripts for Benny Hill and Tony Hancock. His stage play The Square Ring (1952), based on his radio serial Come Out Fighting, was such a success at Frank Thring's Arrow Theatre that the production was transferred to the much larger Princess Theatre, Melbourne. It was the basis of the Ealing Studios film The Square Ring.

Peterson returned to Australia in 1954, the year his second play, The Night of the Ding Dong, premiered. He continued to work in radio and wrote for film and TV.

He had a success with My Name's McGooley, What's Yours? (1966–68).

== Personal ==
Peterson married Betty Helen Lucas of Clovelly road, Clovelly, New South Wales, on 8 November 1946.

== Selected writing credits ==
- Yes, What? (1937–41) – comedy radio series
- Come Out Fighting (1950) – radio serial
- The Problem of Johnny Flourcake (1950) – radio feature
- The Square Ring (1952) – play, later turned into a 1953 film, 1954 novel and 1959 TV movie and 1960 TV play
- Greater the Truth (1956) – novel
- Three in One (1957) – film – segment "The City"
- Whiplash (1961) – TV series
- The Mating of Ulich Dooley (1965) – play
- My Name's McGooley, What's Yours? (1966–68) – TV series – also producer
- Rita and Wally (1968) – TV series – also producer
- The Rovers (1969–70) – TV series
- Snake Gully with Dad and Dave (1972) – TV series – also producer
- Spyforce (1972) – TV series
- The Third Secretary (1972) – play
- The Big Boat – play
