= Bob Hornery =

Australian actor (1931–2015)

- Born: Robert James Hornery; 28 May 1931; Randwick, New South Wales, Australia
- Died: 26 May 2015 (aged 83); Melbourne, Australia
- Occupation: Actor
- Years active: 1949-2012
- Known for: Neighbours as Tom Kennedy

Robert James Hornery (28 May 1931 – 26 May 2015) was an Australian actor. With a career spanning 60 years in both Britain and Australia, he won both the Helpmann Awards and the Equity Awards lifetime achievement award. He was well known for his ability to ad lib.

== Early life and education ==
Robert Hornery was born on 28 May 1931, in Randwick, New South Wales, to Edward Hornery, a sales rep, and his wife, Veronica (née Gallen). He appeared in plays at the local Catholic secondary school, Marcellin College. After leaving school, he worked as a booking clerk for Butler Air Transport. During that period, he also performed in revues with amateur companies.

== Career ==
=== Theatre ===
Hornery started his career in theatre in 1949, and made his professional debut in 1953, when he played Eustace Smell, the town crier and sidekick, in a production of Jack and the Beanstalk, at Sydney's Capitol Theatre. As well as other stage roles, he appeared in the stage production of The Importance of Being Earnest as the Rev. Canon Chasuble, which ran from 1988 to 1992 and was televised by the ABC. He was particularly associated with the Melbourne Theatre Company, in roles ranging from comic to the dramatic, including The Elocution of Benjamin Franklin and A Funny Thing Happened on the Way to the Forum.

=== Screen ===
He appeared in Australian film and television productions, including Thunderstone, and guested in Neighbours as Tom Kennedy, the father of Karl Kennedy. He appeared in the BBC television series Doctor Who and the ATV science-fiction fantasy series Sapphire and Steel. His film roles included Mad Max Beyond Thunderdome and Crackerjack.

== Personal life and death ==
In 1973, Hornery married Patricia Allen. They had a daughter, Jane. He died on 26 May 2015 after a long cancer illness, two days before his 84th birthday. He was survived by his wife, daughter, and stepson, Max Allen.

== Filmography ==
=== Film roles ===
- Phoelix (1980) - Queen Nefertiti
- Britannia Hospital (1982) - BBC Cameraman
- Stanley: Every Home Should Have One (1984) - Dr Chambers
- Mad Max Beyond Thunderdome (1985) - Waterseller
- Ground Zero (1987) - Meteorologist
- Road to Nhill (1997) - Alvin
- Crackerjack (2002) - Ron
