= The Square Ring (play) =

Australian play by Ralph Peterson

- Original language: English
- Written by: Ralph Peterson
- Genre: Boxing drama
- Setting: London, present day

Premiere
- Date: 29 September 1952
- Place: Theatre Royal, Brighton

The Square Ring is a 1952 play by Ralph Peterson. It premiered at the Theatre Royal, Brighton before transferring to the Lyric Theatre in Hammersmith where it ran for 39 performances between 21 October and 22 November 1952. The Lyric cast featured Liam Redmond, John Moffatt, Rex Garner, Ronald Lewis, Bill Owen, John Colicos, Bill Travers, George Rose, Peter Bayliss, Duncan Lamont, Hugh Goldie and Harry Towb.

== Premise ==
The story of several boxers who are fighting on the one night. They include Docker Starkie, a boxer making a comeback.

== Background ==
Peterson wrote an Australian radio play about boxing, Come Out Fighting which aired in 1950.

Peterson moved to London in 1951 and wrote a stage version, The Square Ring, over a three-month period. He sent the play to Anthony Quayle, whom he had met in Sydney when Quayle was touring with the Stratford Players (Quayle had appeared in a radio play written by Peterson about Aboriginal issues, "The Problem of Johnny Flourcake"). Quayle was going to put it on himself but then accepted another theatrical tour of Australia so he passed it to H. M. Tennents, the London theatre agency, who agreed to produce it.

After several weeks of rehearsal, the play premiered in Brighton in September 1952 with a mostly male cast but one female, the wife of the central character. Peterson said "the play never seemed to jell. It got wacky and the girl seemed to be distracting attention from the main story." So he made it an all male story. He also changed it by "I've done away with the normal compression of time. The running time of the play is exactly the period it would take a boxer to arrive in his dressing-room, to wait for his bout, and to complete his fight. It goes on without a break."

Peterson said "The play's only philosophy is: What makes men fight? The answer is simply — money."

The play debuted in London in October 1952 and was acclaimed. It was produced in Melbourne in 1953 at Frank Thring's Arrow Theatre with Thring in the cast. The play received some criticism because of its language but was such a success that the production was transferred to the much larger Princess Theatre.

Joe Louis expressed interest in appearing in a production.

== 1953 film ==
The play was the basis of The Square Ring produced at Ealing Studios. Ronald Lewis reprised his stage performance.

== 1954 novel ==
Peterson adapted the play into a novel which was published in 1954.

== 1959 TV adaptation ==
See The Square Ring (1959 TV play).

== 1960 Australian TV adaptation ==
See 1960 Australian TV adaptation

== 1965 Australian radio adaptation ==
The play was adapted for radio in 1965.

=== Cast ===
- Don Crosby
- Max Osbiston
- John Gray
- Edward Hepple
- John Armstrong
- Robert MacDara
- Alastair Duncan
- Richard Meikle
- Ben Gabriel
- James Condon

== Bibliography ==
- Wearing, J.P. The London Stage 1950–1959: A Calendar of Productions, Performers, and Personnel. Rowman & Littlefield, 2014.
