= The Elocution of Benjamin Franklin =

Australian play

- Original language: English
- Written by: Steve J. Spears

Premiere
- Date: 1976
- Place: Nimrod Theatre

The Elocution of Benjamin Franklin is a "one-hander" play by Australian playwright, author and singer Steve J. Spears (1951 – 2007). It premiered at the Nimrod Theatre in Sydney, Australia in 1976. The performance has been described as a high point of the career of Australian actor Gordon Chater.

== Background ==
Spears wrote that, as a television actor in his twenties, he was so nervous that he mumbled all his lines. He went to an elocution teacher, "a sweetheart.. but a very eccentric sort of lady", who treated him like her other pupils, all children.

Eventually... the thought struck me, I'll write a play about a female elocution teacher, and this poor snook about 25, sort of entrapped by this mad old lady... Then I decided to make it a bloke, a transvestite, and Benjamin happened.

== The play ==
A single actor plays Robert O'Brien, an outwardly respectable elocution tutor based in Toorak. The play begins with O'Brien walking on stage naked, describing the foibles of his students as he dresses. Revelations of his transvestitism and his obsession with a young, beautiful student, one Benjamin Franklin follow. He then reveals he is confined in a "mental institution". Later stagings locate Robert O'Brien's studio in Double Bay.

== Premiere and reception ==
Elocution premiered at the Nimrod in 1976, with Gordon Chater playing O'Brien. The play toured within Australia with box office success.

Elocution went on to become an international success, touring three continents and winning international acclaim.

In its Off-Broadway production in 1979, it won three Obie Awards: Chater as actor, Spears as playwright, and Richard Wherrett as director.

A January 2002 revival starred John Wood, who was praised for his performance. It was prepared by, and was to have been directed by, Richard Wherrett, who died on 7 December 2001.
