= Rita and Wally =

Australian television series

Rita and Wally is an Australian situation comedy series which screened on ATN-7 in 1968. This series was a spin-off from My Name's McGooley, What's Yours?, which ran from 1966 to 1968.

When the title character Dominic McGooley (Gordon Chater) left that series, it effectively continued as a new series under this title. The other regular cast members, John Meillon and Judi Farr, played the title characters along with Noeline Brown. McGooley regular Stewart Ginn also continued in this series. Without the heavy makeup that previously transformed his appearance, he played a new character here.

The key members of the McGooley creative team also carried over to this spin-off. As an innovation the title sequence featured animated figures of the leads with photographic superimposed heads. Notable guest stars were Spike Milligan and Chips Rafferty.

== Synopsis ==
With the spin-off the main character Wally finally received a promotion to a white-collar job and the characters moved from their previous working-class area to more salubrious surrounds. Unfortunately once the show began it became apparent that the working class setting and conflicts, along with the character of McGooley, were crucial to the comedy of the situation and Rita and Wally ended after only a few months. Rita and Wally had a run of 23 half-hour episodes.

The final episode of Rita and Wally featured the return of Stewart Ginn, Frank Taylor and Gordon Chater reprising their roles of Peregrine Nancarrow, Vile and Dominic McGooley.

== Cast ==
- John Meillon as Wally Stiller
- Judi Farr as Rita Stiller
- Noeline Brown as Rosemary 'Possum' Urkens
- Stewart Ginn as Peregrine Nancarrow / Vicar Barrington

== See also ==
- List of Australian television series
