= The Big Killing (Wednesday Theatre) =

- Wednesday Theatre episode
- Episode no.: Season 1 Episode 16
- Directed by: James Upshaw
- Teleplay by: Noel Robinson
- Based on: play by Philip Mackie
- Original air date: 21 April 1965
- Running time: 70 mins

Episode chronology
← Previous "Time and the Conways"	Next → "The Tower"

"The Big Killing" is a 1965 Australian television film which aired on ABC. A murder drama aired in a 70-minute time-slot, it was produced in ABC's Sydney studios. Producer was James Upshaw, whose previous works had included variety series The Lorrae Desmond Show.

It aired as part of Wednesday Theatre on 21 April 1965 in Sydney and Melbourne, and on 28 April 1965 in Brisbane. Australian TV drama was relatively rare at the time.

A search of their website shows that the National Archives of Australia hold a copy of this program, with running time listing as 1:14:31.

== Plot ==
Peter Ashbury is a young man who lives on Palm Beach, Sydney, with an expensive wife Mary and house he cannot afford. Their neighbours and close friends are Liz and Charles Barcher. He makes a £25,000 bet to murder Liz, the wife of the wealthy Charles. When the wife dies, blame attaches to Peter and then to his wife Mary.

== Cast ==
- Roger Climpson as Peter Ashbury
- June Thody as Mary Ashbury
- Nigel Lovell as Charles Barcher
- Benita Harvey as Liz Barcher
- Ron Haddrick as an honest neighbour Gavin Cole
- Stewart Ginn as Inspector Fowler
- Betty Dyson as Norah
- Tommy Dysart as Sgt Basset

== Production ==
It was based on a West End stage play. Ian McKellen appeared in a 1962 production and called it "Another miserably- written "comedy thriller", which made the cast laugh more than the audience and which thrilled no-one."

The ABC bought the rights and it was adapted to be set in Australia. Filmink said "while the setting is ostensibly Sydney’s Palm Beach, the action really takes place in the Dial M for Murder never-never land of stylish cads, swish living rooms and adulterous wives."

The play marked a return to acting by Roger Climpson after an eight-year absence, during which time he had established himself as a newsreader. He had left Channel Nine 18 months previously and been making documentaries since.

== Reception ==
The Canberra Times called the script "two steps backward" and said that "unfortunately the producer James Upshaw who is capable of better, much better things, seemed to have taken his cue from the script rather than the high-powered talent he wastefully cast".

The Sydney Morning Herald said it "made good television viewing."

Another critic for the same paper said it was "like a burst of fireworks... brilliantly acted... must surely rate as THE play so far this year" adding writer Mackie "threw in more angles and red herrings than a Perry Mason episode" and "managed to keep the plot going at a rattling pace until its last moments."

Filmink called it "a fun watch. This is partly due to Mackie’s story, which is full of decent twists and turns, but mostly because of the splendid cast."

== See also ==
- List of live television plays broadcast on Australian Broadcasting Corporation (1950s)
