= Tom Kennedy (Neighbours) =

- Neighbours character
- Portrayed by: Bob Hornery
- Duration: 1996, 1999, 2006–2007
- First appearance: 5 April 1996
- Last appearance: 13 August 2007
In-universe information
- Occupation: Communist; Farmer
- Family: Kennedy
- Wife: Molly Kennedy
- Adoptive sons: Karl Kennedy
- Grandsons: Malcolm Kennedy; Billy Kennedy
- Granddaughters: Libby Kennedy; Holly Hoyland
- Other relatives: Ben Kirk; Jackson Kennedy; Susannah Kennedy

Tom Kennedy is a fictional character from the Australian soap opera Neighbours played by Bob Hornery. He made his first on-screen appearance on 5 April 1996. Hornery reprised the role twice more in 1999 and 2006. In 2007, Neighbours returned to more family focused drama and Hornery reprised his role as Karl's "dotty dad" again. Drew Kirk goes to Tom's farm to visit Libby. Tom later develops dementia and he returns to Erinsborough to be with his family. However, they found it increasingly difficult cope with his condition, and he eventually moved into a nursing home.
