= Ron Frazer =

Australian actor, comedian, writer

Ronald Fraser
- Born: 7 December 1924; Australia
- Died: 8 January 1983 (aged 58); Edgecliff, New South Wales, Australia
- Occupations: Actor; comedian; writer

Ron Frazer (7 December 1924 – 8 January 1983) alternatively Ron Fraser, was an Australian actor, comedian and screenwriter; he was known for roles in theatre and television, primarily as a character actor.

== Career ==
Fraser started his career in 1948 in theatre locally before moving to London, England, working in repertory in the West End, and even appearing briefly in a film, greeting good afternoon to Elizabeth Taylor. Having came back to Australia, he began in stage revue and wrote many skits and gags for the satirical comedy series The Mavis Bramston Show before joining the cast as a regular member in 1966 in various roles, including the character Ocker; Frazer is credited with neologising the Australian slang term "ocker". In another regular routine, Frazer performed in the Bramston show; he used the catchphrase "my second-best friend", and this also gained wide currency at the time.

He had a featured role as the coach in the Australian rules football comedy film The Great Macarthy, alongside Barry Humphries. During the 1976–77 season, he compered the Australian game show Winner Takes All, unrelated to the British namesake. Frazer also appeared in the Australian sitcoms The Gordon Chater Show, Birds in the Bush and the Australian version of Father, Dear Father, which was the sequel to the British sitcom of the same name.

== See also ==
- Forty Years of Television: The Story of ATN 7
- Ron Frazer — Australian National University
