= Steve J. Spears =

Australian playwright, actor, and singer

- Born: Steven John Peter Spears; 22 January 1951; Adelaide, South Australia, Australia
- Died: 16 October 2007 (aged 56); Aldinga, South Australia, Australia
- Occupations: Playwright; writer; actor; singer

Steven John Peter Spears (22 January 1951 – 16 October 2007) was an Australian playwright, actor, writer and singer. His most famous work was The Elocution of Benjamin Franklin (1976). He was cited as "one of Australia's most celebrated playwrights".

== Life and career ==
Spears was born in Adelaide, South Australia on 22 January 1951 and, after his parents separated when he was very young, grew up with relatives in the suburb of Mile End. He studied law at the University of Adelaide, but through writing and performing student revues, was distracted into a career in the theatre. Spears moved to Sydney in the 1970s. In his own words, he was a "born-again Sydney-sider". He had some screen acting experience, including fifteen episodes as Vicki Stafford's unprincipled nephew Roger in The Box in 1975.

Spears died from brain cancer in Aldinga, South Australia, on 16 October 2007, at the age of 56.

== Writing ==
=== Plays ===
Year	Title
1974	Africa: A Savage Musical
1975	People Keep Giving Me Things
1975	Roaring Boy
1975	There Were Giants in Those Days
1975	Young Mo (or The Resuscitation of the Little Prince Who Couldn't Laugh as Performed by Young Mo at the Height of the Great Depression of 1929). About Australian comedian Roy "Mo" Rene
1976	The Elocution of Benjamin Franklin
1976	When They Send Me Three and Fourpence
1978	The Death of George Reeves
1978	King Richard
1980	The Time of the Bodgie
1983	Froggie
1988	Glory
1992	Namatjira Park
1995	A Little Theatre
1995	The Dance Angelic

=== Television ===
Year	Title
	A Country Practice
	Hey Dad..!
1991-93	All Together Now
	Neighbours
	E Street
	G.P.
	Heartbreak High
1996-98	The Genie From Down Under (including the first episode "Wishing and Hoping")
	The Greatest Tune on Earth
2001-02	Fairy Tale Police Department
	Gloria's House
1995	Sky Trackers

=== Books ===
Year	Title	Notes
1990	The Big Wish	Co-written with John Hepworth. Published by Puffin (1990) ISBN 0140144625
1989	In Search of the Bodgie	An "anti-memoir"
2004	Murder at the Fortnight	Detective novel planned as the first of a 13 part series, The Pentangeli Papers, but only one more, Innocent Murders (2006) was published before Spears' death.

== Acting work ==
=== Television ===
Year	Title	Role	Type
1981	A Country Practice		TV series
1988	Hey Dad!		TV series
1989	G.P.		TV series
1997-98	Magic Mountain	Lion (voice)	TV series
2004	Heartbreak High		TV series

=== Film ===
Year	Title	Role	Type
1979	Temperament Unsuited	Mark	Short film
1981	Mad Max 2	The Mechanic	Feature film
1983	Going Down	Trendy at party	Feature film
1985	The Empty Beach	Manny	Feature film
1997	Those Dear Departed	Dangerman	Feature film
1988	Warm Nights on a Slow Moving Train	Singer	Feature film
1989	Afraid to Dance	Garage Man	Feature film

=== Stage ===
Year	Title	Role	Ref
1981	The Rocky Horror Show	Eddie / Dr Scott	
