= Judi Farr =

Australian actress (1938–2023)

Judi Farr AM
- Born: Judith Mary Stuart Farr; 5 October 1938; Cairns, Queensland, Australia
- Died: 30 June 2023 (aged 84); Sydney, New South Wales, Australia
- Other name: Judy Farr
- Occupations: Actress; director
- Years active: 1956–2020
- Television: A Place to Call Home; Please Like Me; Grass Roots; Kingswood Country

Judith Mary Stuart Farr AM (5 October 1938 – 30 June 2023), also credited as Judy Farr, was an Australian actress of theatre, film and television, with a career spanning some seven decades, she was best known locally for several situation comedy roles starting from the early 1960s to the early 1980s, in the early days of Australian television.

She later had small roles in the internationally successful drama series Please Like Me (2013) and A Place to Call Home (2013–2015).

Farr also appeared in Australian films such as Walking on Water, for which she won an AFI award and December Boys.

== Early life ==
Farr was born in Cairns, Queensland in 1938, and was the first born child of Phyllis and Herbert 'Bert' Farr. Her father's death in Borneo during World War 2 prompted her mother to move the family to Bondi, Sydney, where Judi and her brother Michael, grew up by the beach in their grandmother’s unit.

At the age of nine Farr won an elocution competition, reciting William Shakespeare at Sydney Town Hall. She studied ballet for 10 years, quitting in her teen years. She attended Holy Cross School in Woollahra.

Farr enrolled in drama school for 3 months and soon after, joined The Colony Players, an amateur Sydney theatre group, and acted in satirical revues at the Phillip Street Theatre. At age 19, she had her lucky break at the Genesian Theatre in The Skin of Our Teeth.

== Career ==
=== Television ===
Farr made her television debut in a 1962 live broadcast of The Taming of the Shrew on ABC TV.

Farr became well known for her role of Rita Stiller in the situation comedy My Name's McGooley, What's Yours? (1967–1968). She continued to play the character in that show's short-lived sequel series Rita and Wally in 1968.

Later she played a similarly high-profile regular role in a successful sitcom, portraying dizzy wife Thelma Bullpitt in Kingswood Country starting in 1980. She left the series in 1982, and in the script Thelma was sent off on a world cruise. She later sent word she would not be returning to her husband and Farr did not return to the series.

Aside from these roles Farr had a long and busy career acting in dramatic roles in film and theatre, and television. She had guest roles in drama series, television movies and miniseries. Television roles of the 1970s included guest spots on dramas including the Crawford Productions police shows, and a recurring role in soap opera Number 96 in 1974 and 1975, as April Bullock playing in comedy storylines. Later guest appearances include roles in A Country Practice, All Saints and CrashBurn.

Farr was also known for playing Aunt Peg in Please Like Me.

=== Film roles ===
Her first film role was a brief appearance in They're a Weird Mob (1966). Later films include Fatty Finn (1980), The Year My Voice Broke (1987), Flirting (1991) and Oscar and Lucinda (1997). Her film and television roles of the 2000s include Farscape: The Peacekeeper Wars (2004) TV movie, The Alice (2004) TV movie, Thunderstruck (2004), Go Big (2004) TV movie, Walking on Water (2002) and Changi (2001) (miniseries).

=== Theatre work ===
She toured nationally and internationally with Cloudstreet and has worked for all major theatre companies in productions which include Death of a Salesman, Lettice and Lovage (opposite June Salter) and Angels in America.

== Honours and awards ==
Farr was awarded the 1992 Theatre Critics Award for her stage role in Women of Troy and was the winner of the 2002 AFI Best Supporting Actress for her performance in the 2002 film Walking on Water.

She received a 2016 Sydney Theatre Lifetime Achievement Award at the Sydney Theatre Awards.

Farr was appointed a Member of the Order of Australia for "significant service to the performing arts as an actor" in the 2021 Queen's Birthday Honours.

== Personal life ==
In 1963, Farr married Derry Macgillicuddy, after meeting him while performing together in a Genesian Theatre production. The couple had three children – Sean, Sarah and Bridie.

== Illness and death ==
Farr retired from the industry in 2015, after a cancer battle. She had been diagnosed with a squamous cell carcinoma in her parotid gland, during her time working on the A Place to Call Home. The operation to remove it resulted in unilateral facial disfigurement, which was cause for several reconstructive surgeries. Judi had a stroke in 2016.

Farr died of respiratory failure in Sydney on 30 June 2023 after a long illness, at the age of 84.

== Filmography ==
=== Film ===
| Year | Title | Role | Type |
|---|---|---|---|
| 1962 | The Taming of the Shrew | | TV movie |
| 1962 | Family Album | | TV movie |
| 1964 | Split Level | | TV movie |
| 1966 | They're a Weird Mob | Telephonist in Hotel (uncredited) | Feature film |
| 1979 | Dawn! | New Resident | Feature film |
| 1979 | Just Out of Reach | Mother | Feature film |
| 1980 | Fatty Finn | Mrs. Hogan | Feature film |
| 1982 | Dingle and the Dip | | TV movie |
| 1984 | Who Killed Hannah Jane? | Hannah Jane Peden | TV movie |
| 1985 | Brides of the Gods | Narrator | Film documentary |
| 1986 | For Love Alone | Aunt Bea | Feature film |
| 1986 | Double Sculls | Eilen Bayliss | TV movie |
| 1987 | Right From Day One | Herself | Training film |
| 1987 | Go For It | Role unknown | Short film |
| 1987 | The Year My Voice Broke | Sheila Embling | Feature film |
| 1991 | Flirting | Sheila Embling | Feature film |
| 1995 | Mother's Requiem | Mother | Short film |
| 1996 | Turning April | Mother | Feature film |
| 1997 | Oscar and Lucinda | Mrs. Smith | Feature film |
| 2000 | My Mother My Son | Mother | Short film |
| 2002 | Walking on Water | Margaret | Feature film |
| 2003 | Page to Stage | Herself - Performance Director | TV film documentary |
| 2004 | Thunderstruck | Mrs. Jones | Feature film |
| 2004 | Go Big | Marion Katz | TV movie |
| 2004 | The Alice | Lee | TV movie |
| 2006 | Unfolding Florence: The Many Lives of Florence Broadhurst | Florence Broadhurst | Feature film documentary |
| 2006 | Fatal Contact: Bird Flu in America | Mrs. Koppel | TV movie |
| 2007 | December Boys | Reverend Mother | Feature film |
| 2008 | The Sound of Shadows | Christina | Short film |

=== Television ===
| Year | Title | Role | Type |
|---|---|---|---|
| 1964–1965 | Here's Dawn | | TV series |
| 1966 | The Interpretaris | Alys - Computer | TV miniseries, 6 episodes |
| 1966–1968 | My Name's McGooley, What's Yours? | Rita Stiller | TV series, 88 episodes |
| 1968 | Rita and Wally | Rita Stiller | TV series, 8 episodes |
| 1970 | The Link Men | Anna Seberg | TV series, episode 11: "Somebody's Kid Is Missing" |
| 1970, 1971 | Division 4 | Lillian Walker / Trish Carstairs | TV series, 2 episodes |
| 1972 | A Nice Day at the Office | Christine | TV series, 1 episode |
| 1972 | Matlock Police | Jill | TV series, 1 episode |
| 1973 | The Comedy Game | | TV series, 1 episode: "The Engagement Party" |
| 1973 | The Evil Touch | Anne Sullivan | TV series, episode 6: "A Game of Hearts" |
| 1974 | Mac and Merle | | TV series, regular role |
| 1974 | The Fourth Wish | | TV miniseries, 1 episode |
| 1974–1975 | Number 96 | Alderman Mrs April Bullock | TV series, 10 episodes |
| 1975 | Behind the Legend | Harriet | TV series, episode 5: "George Coppin" |
| 1976 | Alvin Purple | Slater | TV series, episode 4: "Hospitality" |
| 1978 | Father, Dear Father in Australia | Aunty Tom | TV series, episode 3: "The Floating Housekeeper" |
| 1978 | Tickled Pink | Rachel Benson | TV series, episode 2: "Relative Air Pollution" |
| 1980–1982 | Kingswood Country | Thelma Bullpitt | TV series, 59 episodes |
| 1983 | Scales of Justice | Mary Miles | TV miniseries, episode 2: "The Game" |
| 1983 | A Country Practice | Faye Simpson | TV series, 2 episodes |
| 1983 | Learned Friends | | TV series, 1 episode |
| 1985 | Double Sculls | Ellen Bayliss | TV film |
| 1985 | Winners | Abbatoir Manager's Wife | TV film series, 1 episode |
| 1986 | A Country Practice | Norma Hammond | TV series, 2 episodes |
| 1986 | Mother and Son | Matron | TV series, 1 episode |
| 1987 | Vietnam | | TV miniseries, 1 episode |
| 1987 | Melba | Amy Davidson | TV miniseries, 2 episodes |
| 1988 | Rafferty's Rules | Rhonda White | TV series, 1 episode |
| 1988 | Mike Willesee's Australians | Ma (Mrs. Lyell) | TV film series, episode 5: "Lottie Lyell" |
| 1989 | G.P. | Joan | TV series, 1 episode |
| 1990 | Come In Spinner | Mrs. Gartred | TV miniseries, 2 episodes |
| 1991 | Boys from the Bush | Phyllis | TV series, 1 episode |
| 1991 | A Country Practice | Grace Mullens | TV series, 1 episode |
| 1991 | E Street | | TV series, 1 episode |
| 1994 | G.P. | Helen Kendall / Kathleen Sutton | TV series, 2 episodes |
| 1997 | Medivac | Arch's Mother | TV series, 1 episode |
| 1997 | Murder Call | Mrs. Parkins | TV series, 1 episode |
| 1999 | All Saints | Kathleen O'Hara | TV series, 4 episodes |
| 2000–2003 | Grass Roots | Janice Corniglio | TV series, 18 episodes |
| 2000 | Stingers | Aunty Jan | TV series, 1 episode |
| 2001 | Changi | Older Joyce | TV miniseries, 1 episode |
| 2001 | Water Rats | Liz Cunio | TV series, 1 episode |
| 2003 | CrashBurn | Marg | TV series, 1 episode |
| 2004 | Farscape: The Peacekeeper Wars | Scarran Doctor | TV miniseries, 2 episodes |
| 2011; 2012 | Laid | Nan / Pearl | TV series, 2 episodes |
| 2012 | Jack Irish: Bad Debts | Mrs. Bishop | TV film, 1 episode |
| 2013 | Please Like Me | Aunty Peg | TV series, 4 episodes |
| 2013 | Twentysomething | Marie | TV series, 1 episode |
| 2013 | Camp | Dorothy Jessup | TV series, 1 episode |
| 2013–2015 | A Place to Call Home | Peg Moloney | TV series, 7 episodes |

=== Television (as self) ===
| Year | Title | Role | Type |
|---|---|---|---|
| 1960 | The Mobil-Limb Show | Herself | TV series, 1 episode |
| 1965 | The Mavis Bramston Show | Herself - Various characters | TV series |
| 1979; 1983 | The Mike Walsh Show | Guest | TV series, 3 episodes |
| 1991 | In Sydney Today | Guest | TV series, 1 episode |
| 1994 | Good Morning Australia | Guest | TV series, 1 episode |
| 1994 | The Mavis Bramston 30th Anniversary Special | Herself | TV special |
| 1996, 2006 | Where Are They Now? | Herself | TV series, 2 episodes |
| 1998 | Denise | Guest | TV series, 1 episode |
| 2007 | Good As Gold! | Herself | TV series, 1 episode |

== Theatre ==
=== As actor ===
| Year | Title | Role | Type |
|---|---|---|---|
| 1958 | The Skin of our Teeth | Sabina | Genesian Theatre, Sydney |
| 1958 | The Vigil | | Genesian Theatre, Sydney |
| 1958 | An Italian Straw Hat | | Genesian Theatre, Sydney |
| 1959 | Julius Caesar | | Genesian Theatre, Sydney |
| 1959 | Hey Diddle Diddle | | Phillip Street Theatre, Sydney |
| 1960 | Mistress Money | | Phillip Street Theatre, Sydney |
| 1960 | Charley’s Aunt | | Elizabethan Theatre, Sydney |
| 1961 | Only an Orphan Girl | | Genesian Theatre, Sydney |
| 1961 | Stop Press | | Phillip Theatre, Sydney |
| 1961 | Yes Please! | | Phillip Street Theatre, Sydney |
| 1962 | At It Again | | Phillip Street Theatre, Sydney |
| 1962 | Alice in Wonderland | | Phillip Theatre, Sydney |
| 1963 | Start Living | | Copenhagen Downstairs Revue, Sydney |
| 1963 | The Rage | | Copenhagen Downstairs Revue, Sydney |
| 1963 | Do You Mind! | | Phillip Street Theatre, Sydney |
| 1964 | Overruled | | St James' Hall, Sydney, Grace Bros Auditorium, Sydney |
| 1965 | Inadmissible Evidence | | UNSW Old Tote Theatre, Sydney |
| 1965 | Village Wooing | | AMP Theatrette, Sydney |
| 1965 | An Evening With Noel Coward | | St James Playhouse, Sydney |
| 1969 | The Rivals | | UNSW Old Tote Theatre, Sydney, SGIO Theatre, Brisbane, Playhouse, Canberra |
| 1970 | It's a Two Foot Six Inches Above the Ground World | | Ensemble Theatre, Sydney |
| 1971 | Madly in Love | | AMP Theatrette, Sydney |
| 1971 | Filth | | Richbrooke Theatre, Sydney |
| 1971 | A Break in the Music | | Independent Theatre, Sydney |
| 1971 | Mixed Doubles | | Independent Theatre, Sydney |
| 1972 | Listen Closely | | Independent Theatre, Sydney |
| 1973 | I Remember Mama | | Independent Theatre, Sydney |
| 1973 | Kabul | | UNSW, Old Tote Theatre, Sydney |
| 1975 | Sonny | | Ensemble Theatre, Sydney |
| 1976 | Habeas Corpus | Lady Rumpers | UNSW Old Tote Theatre, Sydney, Theatre Royal, Sydney |
| 1976 | Rookery Nook | Gertrude Twine | UNSW Old Tote Theatre, Sydney |
| 1977 | Going Bananas: Bananas / The Coroner's Report / The Flaw | | Nimrod Theatre, Sydney |
| 1977 | The Norman Conquests | Sarah | Seymour Centre, Sydney |
| 1978 | Miss Julie | Christine | Sydney Opera House |
| 1978 | Black Comedy | Miss Furnival | Sydney Opera House |
| 1978 | The Misanthrope | Eliante | Sydney Opera House |
| 1978 | The Night of the Iguana | Hannah Jelkes | Sydney Opera House |
| 1979 | Kookaburra | Eileen Clare | ABC Radio Sydney |
| 1979 | The Devil’s Disciple | Mrs Dudgeon | Sydney Opera House with STC |
| 1980 | Traitors | Mother Dybenko / Nadezdah | Nimrod Theatre, Sydney |
| 1981 | The Man from Mukinupin | Edie Perkins | Sydney Opera House with STC |
| 1982 | Death of a Salesman | Linda Loman | Seymour Centre, Sydney |
| 1982 | London Assurance | Lady Gay Spanker | Marian Street Theatre, Sydney |
| 1983 | Blithe Spirit | | Marian Street Theatre, Sydney |
| 1983–1984 | 84 Charing Cross Road | Helene | Marian Street Theatre, Sydney |
| 1984 | Salonika | Enid | Nimrod Theatre, Sydney |
| 1984 | Season’s Greetings | Rachel | Marian Street Theatre, Sydney |
| 1985 | Pack of Lies | Barbara | Marian Street Theatre, Sydney |
| 1985–1986 | Brighton Beach Memoirs | Kate | His Majesty's Theatre, Perth, Comedy Theatre, Melbourne |
| 1987 | When I Was a Girl I Used to Scream and Shout | | Wharf Theatre, Sydney |
| 1987 | Breaking the Silence | Eugenia | Marian Street Theatre, Sydney |
| 1987–1988 | Away | Gwen | Sydney Opera House with STC |
| 1988 | Broadway Bound | Kate | Sydney Opera House |
| 1988 | Summer of the Seventeenth Doll & Away | Emma / Gwen | Pepsico Summerfare Festival, New York with STC |
| 1989 | A Family Affair | Ustinya | Northside Theatre, Sydney |
| 1989 | Curtains | Katherine | Northside Theatre, Sydney |
| 1990 | Wallflowering | Peg | Belvoir Street Theatre, Sydney |
| 1990 | Noises Off | Dotty Otley | Glen Street Theatre, Sydney, Comedy Theatre, Melbourne |
| 1991 | Sailor Beware! | Edie Harnett | Marian Street Theatre, Sydney |
| 1992 | The Sum of Us | Joyce | Wharf Theatre, Sydney with STC |
| 1992 | The Women of Troy | Hecuba | Wharf Theatre, Sydney with STC; Won 1992 Sydney Critics Award for Best Actress |
| 1992 | Lettice and Lovage | Lettice | Illawarra Performing Arts Centre, Suncorp Theatre, Brisbane, Seymour Centre, Sydney |
| 1992 | The Heiress | Mrs Lavinia Perriman | Marian Street Theatre, Sydney |
| 1993 | Angels in America | Hannah / Ethel / Rabbi / Henry | Wharf Theatre, Sydney with STC |
| 1993 | The Human Behan | | Stables Theatre, Sydney |
| 1993 | The Visit | Claire | Sydney Opera House with STC |
| 1994 | A Winning Day | Jane | Q Theatre, Penrith |
| 1994 | The Sisters Rosensweig | Sara Goode | Playhouse, Melbourne, Monash University, Theatre Royal, Hobart, Geelong Arts Centre, Wharf Theatre, Sydney, Glen Street Theatre, Sydney, Canberra Theatre, His Majesty's Theatre, Perth with MTC |
| 1995 | The Chalk Garden | Miss Madrigal | Marian Street Theatre, Sydney |
| 1995 | The Last Yankee | Karen Frick | Cremorne Theatre with QTC |
| 1996 | Live Acts on Stage | Eris | Stables Theatre, Sydney with Griffin Theatre Company |
| 1996 | Archibald Prize - The Play | | Domain Theatre, Sydney |
| 1996 | The Queen and I | The Queen | Comedy Theatre, Melbourne, Monash University, Her Majesty's Theatre, Adelaide, Gold Coast Arts Centre, Newcastle Civic Theatre, Canberra Theatre, University of Sydney |
| 1996 | The Fire on the Snow | Scott | Playhouse, Adelaide with STCSA |
| 1997 | Tartuffe | Madame Pernelle / Grandma | Sydney Opera House with STC |
| 1997 | After-Play | Terry | Marian Street Theatre, Sydney |
| 1998–1999 | Cloudstreet | Oriel | Berth 9, Darling Harbour, Sydney, Malthouse Theatre, Melbourne |
| 1998 | After The Ball | Kate McCrae | Sydney Opera House with STC |
| 1998 | Navigating | Pam Shaw | Sydney Opera House with STC |
| 2000 | Talking Heads | Susan | Marian Street Theatre, Sydney |
| 2001 | Quartet | | Marian Street Theatre, Sydney |
| 2002 | Wicked Sisters | | Stables Theatre, Sydney with Griffin Theatre Company |
| 2002 | Buried Child | Halie | Belvoir Street Theatre, Sydney |
| 2003 | The Vagina Monologues | | University of Wollongong |
| 2004 | The Unlikely Prospect of Happiness | Mary O'Sullivan | Sydney Theatre with STC |
| 2004–2005 | Parramatta Girls | | Belvoir Street Theatre, Sydney |
| 2005 | Love Letters | Melissa Gardner | NIDA Parade Theatre, Sydney |
| 2007 | John Gabriel Borkman | Ella Rentheim / Gunhild Borkman | Bille Brown Studio, Brisbane with QTC |
| 2007 | Glorious | Dorothy | Ensemble Theatre, Sydney |
| 2008 | Boeing-Boeing | Bertha | Comedy Theatre, Melbourne, Theatre Royal, Sydney |
| 2008 | The Pig Iron People | Janette | Sydney Opera House with STC |
| 2009 | The Taming of the Shrew | Biondello | Theatre Royal, Hobart, Sir Robert Helpmann Theatre, Mt Gambier, Chaffey Theatre, Renmark, Barossa Arts and Convention Centre, Northern Festival Centre, Port Pirie, Middleback Theatre, Whyalla, Nautilus Theatre, Port Lincoln, Canberra Theatre, Sydney Opera House with Bell Shakespeare |
| 2010 | The Beauty Queen of Leenane | Mag | Wharf Theatre, Sydney with STC |
| 2010 | August: Osage County | Alternate Violet | STC |
| 2011 | Love, Loss and What I Wore | Various roles | Sydney Opera House |
| 2013 | A Murder Is Announced | Miss Marple | Sydney Theatre, Comedy Theatre, Melbourne |
| 2015 | Seventeen | | Belvoir Street Theatre, Sydney |
| 2020 | Escaped Alone | | Belvoir Street Theatre, Sydney |

=== As director ===
| Year | Title | Role | Type |
|---|---|---|---|
| 1984 | Travelling North | Director | Marian Street Theatre, Sydney |
| 1989 | Jigsaws | Director | Q Theatre, Penrith |
| 1990 | Black Comedy | Director | Glen Street Theatre, Sydney |
| 1990 | Perfect Mismatch | Director | Glen Street Theatre, Sydney |
| 1993 | Absent Friends | Director | Marian Street Theatre, Sydney |
| 1997 | The Memory of Water | Director | Marian Street Theatre, Sydney |
| 2001 | The Gin Game | Director | Marian Street Theatre, Sydney |
| 2001 | Spurboard | Director | Performance Space, Wollongong |
