= The Square Ring (1953 film) =

1953 film by Basil Dearden

- Directed by: Basil Dearden
- Written by: Robert Westerby additional dialogue Peter Myers; Alec Grahame
- Based on: the play by Ralph Peterson
- Produced by: Michael Relph executive Michael Balcon
- Starring: Jack Warner; Robert Beatty; Maxwell Reed; Joan Collins; Kay Kendall; Bernadette O'Farrell; Bill Owen
- Cinematography: Otto Heller
- Edited by: Peter Bezencenet
- Music by: Dock Mathieson
- Production company: Ealing Studios
- Distributed by: GFD (UK)
- Release date: 13 July 1953 (UK)
- Running time: 83 minutes
- Country: United Kingdom
- Language: English

The Square Ring is a 1953 British tragi-comic drama, directed by Basil Dearden and made at Ealing Studios. It stars Jack Warner, Robert Beatty and Maxwell Reed. It was written by Robert Westerby, Peter Myers and Alec Grahame, based on a 1952 stage play by Ralph Peterson, and centres on one night at a seedy boxing venue and tells the disparate stories of the fighters and the women behind them.

== Premise ==
Six stories that take place mainly in the locker room prior to and after various bouts during a single evening at a cheap boxing stadium: ex-champion Kid Curtis (the Docker Starkie role in the original play) attempting a comeback; Eddie Lloyd, a former amateur boxer making his professional debut; ‘Happy’ Burns a chirpy lightweight; Rick Martell, a crooked fighter planning to throw a fight; Whitey Johnson, a punch drunk ‘has-been’; and Rowdie Rawlings, a simple heavyweight. Danny Felton is the experienced ex-pro dressing room attendant.

== Cast ==
- Jack Warner as Danny Felton
- Robert Beatty as Jim 'Kid' Curtis
- Maxwell Reed as Rick Martell
- Joan Collins as Frankie
- Kay Kendall as Eve Lewis
- Bernadette O'Farrell as Peg Curtis
- Bill Owen as Happy Burns
- George Rose as Whitey Johnson
- Bill Travers as Rowdie Rawlings
- Alfie Bass as Frank Forbes
- Ronald Lewis as Eddie Lloyd
- Sid James as Adams
- Eddie Byrne as Lou Lewis
- Michael Golden as Warren
- Joan Sims as Bunty
- Sydney Tafler as 1st wiseacre
- Alexander Gauge as 2nd wiseacre
- Max Osbiston

== Production ==
The play debuted in October 1952 and was immediately successful. Film rights were bought by Michael Balcon at Ealing. In November 1952 he announced John Mills would star, with Basil Dearden to direct and Michael Relph to produce. Relph later said he was reluctant to make the film as he felt box movies were bad box office.

Eventually Mills dropped out and was replaced by Canadian actor Robert Beatty. He had no boxing experience so he trained for two weeks with Dave Crowley in preparation for the role.

The play was all male but three women were added to the film. The women included Kay Kendall and Joan Collins, who were both under contract to Rank. Kendall had just made Genevieve but it had not been released. Collins appeared opposite then husband Maxwell Reed. Ronald Lewis repeated his stage performance.

== Reception ==
The Monthly Film Bulletin wrote: "This slick and unpretentious entertainment picture is perhaps the most satisfactory film that Basil Dearden has yet directed. While there are obvious echoes of the more serious American boxing film, The Set Up, and in fact all the characters can be reduced to stock, Dearden and his writers have dressed up the basic conventions with liveliness and adroit professionalism. The Square Ring, in fact, sets the level of what the superior British entertainment film should be, but not very often is. ... As a series of sketches the material is not required to take more weight than it can stand, is evenly matched by the craftsmanship and slightly facile vigour of the handling."

The Daily Film Renter wrote: "By no means pretty, it has the fascination inseparable from watching how the other half lives, in this instance those broken-down 'pugs', has-beens, raw amateurs and would-be come-back champs of Adam's Stadium, an establishment which wavers on the thin edge of losing its Boxing Board of Control licence."

Variety thought it was "authentic".

== See also ==
- List of boxing films
