= Nipper Winmarti =

Australian Aboriginal tracker (c. 1920–1993)

Nipper Winmarti also recorded as Nipper Winmati (c. 1920 – 1993) was a Pitjantjatjara man who worked as an Aboriginal tracker at the Uluṟu-Kata Tjuṯa National Park where he was also recognised as a traditional owner. Winmarti worked as a tracker following the death of Azaria Chamberlain in 1980 and believed that baby Azaria had been taken by a dingo; he was the only Aboriginal tracker to give evidence at the first inquest.

Winmarti was present at the hand back of Uluṟu to traditional owners in 1985 and is featured in many images captured that day alongside Sir Ninian Stephen.

== Biography ==
Few early records exist but Winmarti was likely born in Areyonga; he later married Barbara Winmarti (also known as Tjukadoo/Tjikadu) with whom he had four children. He also spent much of his life in Curtin Springs and Docker River (Kaltukatjara), with frequent travels made to Uluṟu.

During World War II, Winmarti was employed on a 'Native labour gang' near Darwin and was likely there during the Bombing of Darwin.

In August 1980, Winmarti was brought in as one of five trackers following the disappearance of Azaria Chamberlain; he became the only tracker to give evidence at the first inquest and clearly stated that the baby had been taken by a dingo. He told the Commission, "[i]t was the baby the dingo was carrying, and as he was trying to climb up the rise of the sand-hill, it was really hard for him to climb up"; he assured the Commission that he had seen the tracks with his own eyes: "They had gone and come out [of the tent]". This testimony was widely shared by the media. At the same inquest, he also stated that he believed Lindy Chamberlain was a "poor harmless woman".

Many doubted his claims; during a later TV interview with Channel 10 (Australia), he told the TV audience that he was a Christian and he did not tell lies.

Winmarti's wife Barbara also worked as a tracker during this incident and agreed with her husband about the presence of a dingo. It is also recorded that, on the night Azaria was taken, Winmarti and Barbara were very distressed and that they "repeated their story several times to anyone who would listen and were both quite upset. They insisted something was very, very wrong".

His testimony being taken so lightly has been seen by many as a failure of the justice system because his evidence as an expert was devalued while flawed forensic evidence was accepted. This was likely due, in part, to Winmarti giving his evidence in the Pitjantjatjara language and the difficulty of translating this into English. He was not called to give evidence at any further inquests or trial of Lindy or Michael Chamberlain.

On 18 August 1983, Winmarti also worked as a tracker looking for Douglas Crabbe after he drove his truck into the crowded bar of the Inland Motel near Uluṟu.

In 1985, Winmarti was present at the hand back of Uluṟu to traditional owners and accepted ownership of it from the then Governor-General of Australia Sir Ninan Stephen; as a part of this ceremony, Winmarti handed the ownership to his grandson Kiatipi to symbolise ancestral links. In coverage around this event, Winmarti stated that he wanted to ensure it was called Uluṟu and not Ayers Rock and that Maggie Springs become known as Mutitjulu Waterhole. He had been a key witness in the land claim.

Winmarti died in 1993; his death was discussed in the Northern Territory Legislative Assembly where Neil Bell spoke about the many times that they had met and all that Winmarti had taught him of Pitjantjara culture. Bell said:

In the last year or so, Nipper became very aware of his increasing frailty. His dignity never diminished during that time. It was as solid as the Rock which defined him and his place in the order of things. In some ways, death loses a little of its sting with the demise of holders of such an ancient and proud tradition. His presence will be felt whenever we look at the Rock and trace with the eye the tracks of the Mala men carved out over centuries.

— Neil Bell, Northern Territory Legislative Assembly, 17 August 1993

Bell had also, in 1977, donated recordings of songs and speech in Pitjantjatjara by Winmarti to AIATSIS.

Gary Cartwright also spoke of Winmarti, who he had met in 1968, in Parliament. He spoke of him with great regard and said of him:

Nipper Winmarti was a great man in both western and Aboriginal ways. He was a symbol of Uluru, as Uluru is a symbol of Australia.

— Gary Cartwright, Northern Territory Legislative Assembly, 19 August 1993
