= John Bryson (author) =

Australian author and lawyer (1935–2022)

- Born: 25 December 1935; Melbourne, Australia
- Died: 5 February 2022 (aged 86); Sydney, Australia
- Occupation: Writer
- Writing career
- Genres: Biography, fiction, non-fiction
- Notable awards: 1985 Victorian Premier's Award for non-fiction, winner; 1986 Crime Writers' Association Gold Dagger for non-fiction, winner

John Bryson AM (25 December 1935 – 5 February 2022) was an Australian author and lawyer. He wrote works of fiction, biography and non-fiction.

== Life ==
Bryson was born in Melbourne on 25 December 1935. He attended the University of Melbourne, where he studied law.

== Career ==
In 1971, after practising law for 10 years, first as a solicitor and later as a barrister, he became chairman and managing director of a Melbourne public company. In 1978, he rejoined the Victorian Bar. He was a member of the Literature Board of the Australia Council, later becoming acting chairman.

== Works ==
Since 1973, Bryson's articles and stories have been published in Australian newspapers.

Bryson's best-known work is his 1985 book Evil Angels: The Case of Lindy Chamberlain which chronicles the story of Lindy Chamberlain's trial for murder, following the Death of Azaria Chamberlain. It was made into a film of the same name starring Meryl Streep in 1988. It was released under its original title in Australia and New Zealand and as A Cry in the Dark in other English-speaking territories, including the United States, Canada, the United Kingdom, and South Africa. It is also known by similar titles internationally.

Bryson was also the author of a 1981 collection of short fiction, Whoring Around, and a collection of reportage, Backstage at the Revolution. His novel of the Spanish Civil War, To the Death, Amic, was published by Viking in 1994 and as Hasta la Muerte, Amigo by Editorial Milenio Spain in 2006. In 2004 he originated and co-produced Secrets of the Juryroom, a documentary for SBS-TV.

In 2013, he was published in eBook format for his works of both fiction and non-fiction. Many of the non-fiction titles included collections of articles he had published as a journalist.

He died in Sydney on 5 February 2022, at the age of 86.

== Awards ==
- 1979 The Routine, one of the stories that was later included in Whoring Around, received the 1979 Patricia Hackett Award at the University of Western Australia
- 1985 Victorian Premier's Award for non-fiction
- 1986 Allen Lane Award
- 1986 Nettie Palmer Prize for Australian Nonfiction
- 1986 British Crime Writers' Association Gold Dagger
- 2000, a panel of journalism schools included him in "The 100 Australian Journalists of the Century".
- 2014 appointed a Member of the Order of Australia for services to Australian literature, support for Indigenous youth, and community.

== Bibliography ==
=== Fiction ===
- Whoring Around Penguin Books (1981)
- Melodram fur eine Heldin aus Plast Spektrum, Berlin (1985)
- Children Aren't Supposed to be Here at All in the Penguin Century of Australian Stories (2000)
- To the Death, Amic Penguin (1994)
- Hasta la Muerte, Amigo Editorial Milenio, Spain (2006)
- A World This Size, eBook (2013)
- Fancygoods Over the Mountain, eBook (2013)
- Homage to a Born Insurgent, eBook (2013)
- Whoring Around, a Novella, eBook (2013)
- Stories of Laughter and Lament, eBook (2013)

=== Non-fiction ===
- Evil Angels Penguin (1985) and Hachette (2000) and in 12 languages
- Backstage at the Revolution Penguin (1986)
- The Personality of War, eBook (2013)
- A Long Weekend in Belfast, eBook (2013)
- Islanders, Far South, eBook (2013)
- In Rage, Rebellion, eBook (2013)
- Three Revolutions, eBook (2013)
- Among the Very Foreign, eBook (2013)
- Brilliant Artists in Trio, eBook (2013)
