= Eremophila tenella =

Conservation status
- Priority One — Poorly Known Taxa (DEC)

Scientific classification
- Kingdom: Plantae
- Clade: Embryophytes
- Clade: Tracheophytes
- Clade: Spermatophytes
- Clade: Angiosperms
- Clade: Eudicots
- Clade: Asterids
- Order: Lamiales
- Family: Scrophulariaceae
- Genus: Eremophila
- Species: E. tenella

Binomial name
- Eremophila tenella Chinnock

Species of flowering plant

Eremophila tenella is a flowering plant in the figwort family, Scrophulariaceae and is endemic to Western Australia. It is an erect, spindly shrub with pendulous branches and with its branches and leaves covered with a layer of fine, branched, yellow-grey hairs. Its buds are yellowish but open to white or pale lilac flowers.

== Description ==
Eremophila tenella is an erect, spindly shrub which grows to a height of between 1 and 3 m (3 and 10 ft). Its branches, leaves and other green parts are covered with a layer of yellowish-grey, star-like hairs which are difficult to distinguish as individual hairs. The branches are mostly less than 1 mm (0.04 in) in diameter, flexible, flattened near the tips and tend to droop. The leaves are arranged alternately and scattered along the branches, linear to elliptic or lance-shaped, 14–25 mm (0.6–1 in) long and 1–2 mm (0.04–0.08 in) wide.

The flowers are borne singly or in pairs in leaf axils on straight, hairy stalks mostly 10–15 mm (0.4–0.6 in) long. There are 5 lance-shaped sepals which are 5–10 mm (0.2–0.4 in) long and densely covered with branched hairs, especially on the inner surface. The flower buds are yellowish but when the flowers open, the petals are white to pale lilac. The petals are 12–18 mm (0.47–0.71 in) long and are joined at their lower end to form a tube. The outside of the petal tube is mostly glabrous but the outer surface of the petal lobes is hairy, whilst their inner surface is glabrous. The inside of the tube is filled with long, soft hairs. The 4 stamens are fully enclosed in the petal tube. Flowering mainly occurs between August and September and is followed by fruit which are dry, woody, oval-shaped and 6.5–8 mm (0.26–0.31 in) long with a papery covering.

== Taxonomy and naming ==
The species was first formally described by Robert Chinnock in 2007 and the description was published in Eremophila and Allied Genera: A Monograph of the Plant Family Myoporaceae. The specific epithet (tenella) is a Latin word meaning "soft" or "delicate", referring to the slender, flexible branches.

== Distribution and habitat ==
This eremophila is common in the Paterson Range near Christmas Pool, emerging above grassland on stony hillsides, 20 km (10 mi) south-west of Telfer in the Little Sandy Desert biogeographic region.

== Conservation ==
Eremophila tenella is classified as "Priority One" by the Western Australian Government Department of Parks and Wildlife, meaning that it is known from only one or a few locations which are potentially at risk.

== Use in horticulture ==
This eremophila is new to horticulture and its requirements in the garden are not well known. It can be propagated by grafting onto Myoporum rootstock and mature plants require a well-drained soil in a sunny position. It has proven difficult to grow in southern states and is known to be damaged by frost.
