= Malcolm Donnelly =

Australian baritone opera singer

Malcolm Douglas Donnelly AM (born 8 February 1943 in Sydney). is an Australian baritone opera singer.

Donnelly studied with Marianne Mathy at the Sydney Conservatorium of Music and with Vida Harford in London. His career started with the Elizabethan Trust Opera. From there he travelled to London for further study, joining the Scottish Opera in 1971. From 1981 to 1985 he was a member of the English National Opera.

During 1984 Malcolm Donnelly returned to Australia, debuting with the Australian Opera in 1985.

Since returning to Australia Donnelly has provided Master classes to young singers in Sydney. In 2002, he created the roles of Commissioner/Judge in the world premiere of Moya Henderson's opera Lindy.

On 26 January 2005 he was awarded the Member of the Order of Australia (AM) in the Australia Day Honours. His citation reads "For service to the performing arts as an operatic baritone and to the education and mentoring of young singers."
