= Lindy (opera) =

Opera by Moya Henderson

Lindy is an opera in two acts by Australian composer Moya Henderson to an English libretto by Judith Rodriguez. It is based on the death of Lindy and Michael Chamberlain's baby Azaria Chamberlain in the Australian outback at Uluru in 1980.

The opera lasts for about 1 hour and 35 minutes. It premiered on 25 October 2002 at the Sydney Opera House.

== Roles ==
Roles, voice types, premiere cast and creatives
Role	Voice type	Premiere cast, 25 October 2002 Conductor: Richard Gill
Lindy Chamberlain	soprano	Joanna Cole
Michael Chamberlain	tenor	David Hobson
Defence Counsel	mezzo-soprano	Elizabeth Campbell
Prosecuting Counsel	tenor	Barry Ryan
Commissioner/Judge	baritone	Malcolm Donnelly
Forensic Expert	mezzo-soprano	Kerry Elizabeth Brown
Greg Lowe/Blood Expert	bass	John Antoniou
Warden/Barbara Tjikadu	soprano	Jennifer Bermingham
Man/Policeman	bass	John Brunato
Teeth Expert/Sergeant	bass-baritone	Richard Alexander
Sally Lowe	mezzo-soprano	Jacqueline Moran
Defence Expert/Solicitor	tenor	Graeme MacFarlane
Textile Expert/Nurse Downs	mezzo-soprano	Elizabeth Campbell
Ranger/Nuwe Minyintirri/ Superintendent	bass	Michael Saunders
Director		Stuart Maunder
Design		Meredith Shaw
Lighting		Toby Sewell

== Recording ==
The performances of 31 October and 2 November were used for the CD recording by ABC Classics (Cat: 476 7489, UPC Number: 028947674894).
