= Murder of Maxwell Confait =

1972 murder in London, England

Coordinates: 51.4455°N 0.0244°W

The victim, presenting as female

Maxwell Thomas Berty Confait (1945 – 21 or 22 April 1972), also known locally as Michelle and "Handbag", was a 26-year-old Seychelles-born cross-dresser who was murdered in London, England, on either 21 or 22 April 1972. The investigation into Confait's death and the convictions of three youths based on confessions of dubious validity raised questions about police procedures in the United Kingdom and caused a major review in how police treat suspects, particularly minors and the "educationally subnormal". This ultimately led to the introduction of appropriate adults to the legal system in England and Wales.

== Incident ==
The fire brigade was called to 27 Doggett Road in Catford, South East London, at 1:21 a.m. on 22 April 1972. One of the firefighters found the body of a mixed-race person in the upstairs back bedroom of the house behind a locked door. The fire was extinguished by 1:31 a.m. and the police arrived at 1:45 a.m., followed by a forensic pathologist at 2:00 a.m.

The body was that of the lodger Confait, known to friends as Michelle and legally as Maxwell. Confait was a cross-dresser (Note: The terms used at the time were "transvestite" (for a cross-dresser) and "transsexual" (for someone who had had a change of sex).) and sex worker. One of the fire officers said Confait was also known locally as "Handbag", due to often being seen carrying one.

Confait's lips were blue and there were marks where Confait had been strangled with a rope or cord. Later, a lamp was discovered in a cupboard under the stairs and the cord in the dressing table drawer of the room where the body had been discovered. The coroner found the cause of death to have been asphyxia.

It was concluded that Confait had been killed on either 21 or 22 April 1972. The evidence examined by a later inquiry known as the Fisher Inquiry concluded that death had occurred on the evening of 21 April 1972, although there was a possibility the murder was committed after midnight as originally concluded. Moreover, a theory presented years later – in 1980 – put the date of death at 2–3 days earlier. The police surgeon had not measured the body's rectal temperature to establish the time of death, because the senior policeman had noted that Confait was a "possible homosexual" and he did not wish to destroy any evidence of recent sexual activity.

== Investigation of Winston Goode ==
The home where the body was found was that of Confait's landlord, Winston Goode. The two had first met in a public house in Lewisham, SE London, in 1970, shortly after Goode had separated from his wife. Confait and Goode reportedly shared a habit of wearing women's clothes, and in February 1972, Confait began renting a room at Goode's house.

Goode was considered a suspect in Confait's murder in the initial police investigation. During police interviews, Goode mentioned that he knew Confait planned to move out of the home. He admitted to being jealous but denied any sexual relationship.

Days after the murder, Goode was admitted to Bexley Psychiatric Hospital in a confused and traumatised state. In May 1974, he took his own life by swallowing cyanide.

== Arson and arrests of Lattimore, Leighton and Salih ==
Two days after the discovery of Confait's body, on 24 April 1972, there were a number of other fires in the area, including alongside the railway line near Catford Bridge station, in a small sports hut on Ladywell Fields, and at a derelict house in the next street, 1 Nelgarde Road. The police apprehended an 18-year-old man, Colin Lattimore. Lattimore admitted to lighting the fire at Doggett Road with his friend Ronnie Leighton, aged 15, and 14-year-old Ahmet Salih. Leighton and Salih were subsequently also arrested. Later, Lattimore's brother said he had severe learning disabilities and could neither read nor write.

All three of the boys were questioned without any other adult being present, despite the law stipulating that "As far as practicable, children (whether suspected of a crime or not) should only be interviewed in the presence of a parent or guardian, or, in their absence, some person who is not a police officer and is of the same sex as the child." During the interrogations, all three of the youths admitted to starting the fire at the Doggett Road home. Lattimore and Leighton also admitted to the murder of Confait. All the boys said they had been victims of police brutality.

== Trial and convictions ==
By 25 April 1972, three days after the murder, the police considered the case solved.

After a preliminary hearing at Woolwich Magistrates' Court, Lattimore and Leighton were sent back to Ashford Remand Centre on charges of murder. Salih was charged with arson but was released on police bail. The families of the three boys and their legal representatives pointed out that all three boys had alibis for when the police surgeon and the pathologist had estimated Confait's death to have occurred.

In court, the pathologist, Professor James Cameron, changed his opinion concerning the time of death, saying it could have been as late as 1:00 a.m. and that the heat of the fire could have sped up the onset of rigor mortis.

On 24 November 1972, the jury found Colin Lattimore guilty of manslaughter on the grounds of diminished responsibility and two counts of arson for the fires at Doggett Road and Ladywell Fields. He was ordered to be detained indefinitely under the Mental Health Act 1959 and was sent to Rampton Hospital in Nottinghamshire. Ronnie Leighton was found guilty of murder, of arson at Doggett Road and Ladywell Fields, and of a burglary at a nearby address. He was sent to Aylesbury Prison for a life sentence. Ahmet Salih was found guilty of burglary and arson and was sent to the Royal Philanthropic School in Redhill for a four-year sentence due to his age.

== Appeals and exonerations ==
On 26 July 1973, the Court of Appeal rejected an appeal by the boys' legal representatives.

Colin Lattimore's father, insistent that his son was innocent, wrote many letters, including to the Queen, Prime Minister and Home Secretary. His Member of Parliament, Carol Johnson, wrote to the Home Office.

The general election in February 1974 brought Roy Jenkins and Alex Lyon, both of whom were committed to reviewing miscarriages of justice, into the Home Office. The new Member of Parliament for Lewisham was Christopher Price, MP, who had been working for Thames Television and became Principal of Leeds Metropolitan University after leaving Parliament . The National Council for Civil Liberties had also become interested in the case and contacted one of the leading pathologists in the country, Professor Donald Teare.

A 30-minute documentary about the case, in which Teare placed Confait's death between 6:30 p.m. and 10:30 p.m., was screened on ITV in November 1974. Another contemporary pathologist, Professor Keith Simpson, was brought in, and he broadly agreed with Professor Teare.

During spring 1974, the Lord Chief Justice Lord Widgery, gave his opinion that this case could properly be referred back to the Court of Appeal. On 18 June 1975, Roy Jenkins announced in Parliament that he was referring the case to the Appeal Court.

On 17 October 1975, the convictions of all three boys were thrown out by the Court of Appeal. Lord Scarman criticised the police for their handling of the case and declared all three young men "innocent" in his final verdict. The Home Secretary then ordered a further police enquiry into Confait's murder. No arrests resulted from the enquiry, and the case remained unsolved.

== Fisher Inquiry and report ==
After the acquittals by the Appeal Court, Jenkins ordered a full inquiry chaired by Sir Henry "Harry" Fisher. His primary mission was to make recommendations about the Judges' Rules stipulating how police should treat suspects, particularly children and "the educationally subnormal", which were found to be palpably in need of review. Fisher accepted the chairmanship on condition that he should also be free to find any individual guilty of the crime on "the balance of probabilities", which is the civil standard of legal proof in the UK. In spite of opposition from some civil servants, he was allowed to proceed on this basis.

In his report, Fisher rejected the defendants' accusations of police brutality and stated that two of the defendants in the Confait murder were "guilty on balance of probability" even though they had been exonerated from criminal guilt. Because this statement was potentially libellous, the report was, exceptionally, published as a "Return to the House of Commons", which made it immune from litigation in the courts of justice. However, Fisher's report also found that the police had "to all intents and purposes all but closed down the investigation" into Confait's murder after the boys' confessions and pointed out procedural issues with the investigation and the protection of the suspects' rights. In the report, Fisher pointed out that his enquiry was limited and could not create "fundamental changes in the law relating to police investigation and criminal protection", remarking that a Royal Commission would be needed to create such reform.

In August 1980, Sir Michael Havers prepared a statement to Parliament declaring the three young men innocent. When he sent for Fisher asking him to concur with this statement, Fisher refused to do so.

After Fisher's death in 2005, Louis Blom-Cooper, who had represented the three young men, wrote to The Independent seeking to correct a flurry of obituaries that described Fisher as exonerating the boys. "Commendably, Harry Fisher never sought to defend his findings to me," wrote Blom-Cooper. "He acknowledged, by implication, that he had got egg on his face."

== Changes to British law ==
Fisher's conclusions, and other high-profile cases of misconduct, led to the setting up of the Royal Commission on Criminal Procedure (1979–1981). The Commission examined and made recommendations for policy change regarding the powers and duties of the police in respect of the investigation of criminal offences, the rights of suspects, and the responsibility for the prosecution of criminal offences. The commission held 50 full meetings, beginning in 1978, and its final report was published in 1981.

After that report was published, Patrick Mayhew described the current state of British law, absent reform, as harming both police and suspects. In a statement in the House of Commons in 1981, Mayhew said: "Both the police and the suspect are hampered by this state of affairs – the police because they may be obliged to operate in areas of doubtful or ambiguous legal authority and the suspect because his rights at any particular moment may be so unclear that he lacks any proper or practical legal protection."

As a result of increased attention to police procedure, the Police and Criminal Evidence Act 1984 and the Prosecution of Offences Act 1985 were passed on a bipartisan basis, and the Crown Prosecution Service was established as well.

== Alternative suspect Douglas Franklin ==
On 20 February 1980, Detective Chief Superintendent E.J. George and Inspector E. Ellison presented a report to the Director of Public Prosecutions identifying Douglas Franklin as Confait's murderer and Paul Pooley as a witness to the murder. Paul Pooley, the son of prisoners' rights organisation PROP founder Dick Pooley, said that he had witnessed Franklin commit the murder. While Franklin and Confait were both imprisoned at HM Prison Wormwood Scrubs, Franklin had acted as Confait's "lover/protector". Then-Attorney General Michael Havers ruled that since Franklin and Pooley would likely incriminate each other if the case were brought to court, neither would be prosecuted.

The report concluded that the times of death estimated by both prosecution and defence experts were wrong, as they had assumed that rigor mortis was commencing at the time of the discovery of the fire. In fact, later evidence showed that Confait had been dead for over 48 hours and rigor mortis was wearing off. Two eminent forensic pathologists, Professors Alan Usher and Keith Mant, confirmed this conclusion, stressing that the discoloration of the organs of the body at the post-mortem indicated 72 hours had passed since death.

George and Ellison's report also noted that it was likely that Douglas Franklin "would have emerged at an early stage as a major suspect" if the three youths had not been arrested and police assumed they were guilty.

Shortly after being interviewed by George and Ellison, Franklin took his own life.

== In popular culture ==
In October 2019, the case was examined in the BBC Two programme Catching Britain's Killers: The Crimes That Changed Us.
