= Lindy Chamberlain-Creighton =

Australian wrongly convicted of murder

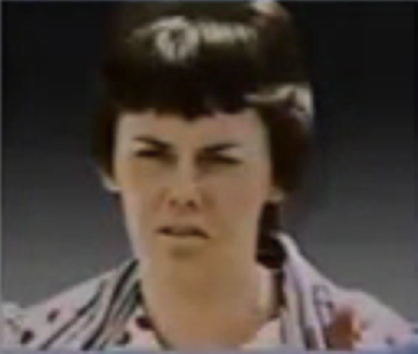
- Chamberlain in a 1986 news broadcast
- Born: Alice Lynne Murchison; 4 March 1948 (age 78); Whakatāne, New Zealand
- Known for: Imprisoned for three years after being falsely convicted of the murder of her 9-week-old daughter, Azaria (later exonerated)
- Spouses: Michael Chamberlain (m. 1969; div. 1991) Rick Creighton (m. 1992)
- Children: 4, including Azaria

Alice Lynne "Lindy" Chamberlain-Creighton (née Murchison, born 4 March 1948) is a New Zealand-born Australian woman who was wrongly convicted in one of Australia's most publicised and notorious trials. Accused of killing her nine-week-old daughter, Azaria, while camping at Uluru (known then as Ayers Rock) in 1980, she maintained that she saw a dingo leave the tent where Azaria was sleeping. The prosecution case was circumstantial and depended upon forensic evidence that was eventually found to be deeply flawed.

Chamberlain was convicted on 29 October 1982, and her appeals to the Federal Court of Australia, and High Court of Australia, were dismissed. On 7 February 1986, after the discovery of new evidence — clothing the same as Azaria wore — Chamberlain was released from prison on remission. She and her husband Michael Chamberlain, co-accused, were officially pardoned in 1987, and their convictions were quashed by the Supreme Court of the Northern Territory in 1988. In 1992, the Australian government paid Chamberlain $1.3 million in compensation. In 2012, a fourth coroner's inquest found (as did the first inquest) that Azaria died "as a result of being attacked and taken by a dingo".

== Early life and family ==
Alice Lynne Murchison, known as "Lindy" from a young age, was born on 4 March 1948 in Whakatāne, New Zealand, the daughter of Avis and Cliff Murchison. The family were members of the Seventh-day Adventist Church, with her father working as a church pastor.

In 1949 (when Lindy was 20 months old), the family moved to Australia and based themselves in Victoria, with regular moves (usually once per year) as Lindy's father transferred to pastor new churches. She received her education in Victoria and gained her Matriculation in Benalla in 1965. During holiday times, she worked as a shop assistant, a clerk, and waitressing. In later times, she found work as a receptionist and as a bookkeeper.

On 18 November 1969, she married an Adventist pastor, the New Zealand-born Michael Chamberlain, and for the first five years after their marriage they lived in Tasmania with Michael pastoring to churches there. This is where Aiden, her first child, was born in 1973. During these 5 years, Lindy gained her certificate from Launceston Technical College in dressmaking, tailoring and drafting. The new family then moved to Queensland, with Lindy later giving birth to her second child (Regan) in Bowen in 1976 and, after living in Innisfail, they moved to Mount Isa in Northern Queensland.

Friends of Lindy's were aware that she had always wanted a girl (with one, Mrs. Ransom, later giving evidence about this) and on 11 June 1980 the Chamberlain's first daughter, Azaria, was born. At this time in 1980, and when their daughter Azaria went missing, Michael Chamberlain was serving as minister of Mount Isa's Seventh-day Adventist church with Lindy being highly involved in the church as well as doing the normal duties of a clergyman's wife. She was also using her dressmaking skills to specialise in making wedding dresses to order.

Her second daughter and fourth child, Kahlia, was born in November 1982 at the Darwin Hospital while Lindy was in the custody of Darwin Prison after being falsely convicted of Azaria's murder. Lindy's new baby daughter was taken from her at birth prior to her return to prison to continue serving her mandatory life sentence with hard labour.

== Azaria's disappearance ==
When Azaria was 9 weeks old, the family went on a camping trip to Uluru, arriving on 16 August 1980. On the night of 17 August, Chamberlain reported that the child had been taken from their tent by a dingo. A massive search was organised; Azaria was not found but the jumpsuit she had been wearing was discovered about a week later about 4 kilometres (2.5 mi) from the tent, bloodstained about the neck, indicating the probable death of the missing child. A matinee jacket the child had been wearing was not found at the time. From the day Azaria went missing, Lindy and Michael Chamberlain maintained a dingo took their child. Early on in the case, the facts showed that for the two years before Azaria went missing, Uluru chief ranger Derek Roff had been writing to the government urging a dingo cull and warning of imminent human tragedy. Roff noted that dingoes in the area were becoming increasingly aggressive, approaching and sometimes biting people.

== Conviction, imprisonment and release ==
The initial inquiry, held in Alice Springs, Northern Territory, by Alice Springs magistrate and coroner Dennis Barritt in December 1980 and January 1981, supported the Chamberlains' account of Azaria's disappearance, finding a dingo took the child. The Supreme Court quashed the findings of the initial inquest and ordered a second inquest in December 1981, with the taking of evidence concluded in February 1982. By an indictment presented to the Supreme Court of the Northern Territory in September 1982, Chamberlain was charged with Azaria's murder. Michael Chamberlain was charged with being an accessory after the fact. On 29 October 1982 the Chamberlains were both found guilty as charged.

=== First inquest ===
As is common in cases where someone dies in unusual or suspicious circumstances, a coronial inquest was held to attempt to determine the manner and cause of death. The first of many inquests was held from 15 December 1980 to 20 February 1981 in Alice Springs. The coroner, Stipendiary Magistrate Denis Barritt, found that a dingo snatched and killed Azaria Chamberlain. The parents, Michael and Lindy Chamberlain, were not implicated in any way with the disappearance of their child.

=== Second inquest ===
In committing the Chamberlains for trial, the coroner who performed the second inquest and recorded the findings as to the cause and manner of Azaria's death stated that although the evidence was to a large degree circumstantial, a properly instructed jury could arrive at a verdict with regard to the clothing evidence. He surmised that the Chamberlains knew dingoes were in the area, attempted to simulate a dingo attack, recovered Azaria's buried body, removed her clothing, damaged the clothing by cutting, rubbed the clothing in vegetation, and deposited the clothing for later recovery. On this basis and that of blood evidence of unknown origin found in the Chamberlains' car, the Chamberlains were prosecuted and convicted for the murder of their two-month-old baby, with Lindy sentenced to life imprisonment without parole and Michael Chamberlain suspended for three years as an accessory to murder. The stain assumed to have been blood that was found in the Chamberlains' car was later determined to be most likely a sound-deadening compound from a manufacturing overspray.

=== Prosecution claims ===
The prosecution's theory was that in a five- to ten-minute absence from the camp fire, Lindy returned to her tent, stopped her young son Aidan from following her, changed into tracksuit pants, took Azaria to her car, obtained and used scissors to cut Azaria's throat, either the carotid arteries or jugular veins. All experts stated there was an absence of evidence of arterial bleeding on the jumpsuit and death would have taken up to 20 minutes if the jugular was cut. The prosecution continued that she then waited for Azaria to die, hid the body in a camera case in the car, cleaned the blood from everything including the outside of the camera case, removed her tracksuit pants, obtained baked beans for her son from the car, returned to the tent, left blood splashes there, and then brought her son Aidan back to the campfire without attracting the attention of other campers. Camper Greg Lowe gave evidence that he observed her go to the tent with Azaria and Aidan and then walk to the car with her left arm around Aidan and her right arm unimpeded. She then returned to the tent and immediately claimed that she saw a dingo taking her baby with evidence implicating a dingo being purely coincidental. It was claimed she was fortunate that no one noticed alleged blood on Chamberlain's clothes in the hours after the disappearance. Chamberlain opening the car where the body was allegedly hidden to give a dog the scent of Azaria from her clothes in the car was called a daring act. She also must have done it without her husband's knowledge or he was also incredibly daring since he left his children in her care afterwards. He told the police that he had given them the wrong camera case and then gave them the one that was allegedly used to conceal the body.

In the second inquest, concerning the clothing evidence alone:

1. The clothing of the deceased child had been buried prior to its finding and probably contained the body of the child when buried.
2. Soil type of a pH found on the clothing is consistent with the pH of the soil at the camp and also with the consistency of the soil in clothing and at the site and is inconsistent with the type of soil and pH in the area in which the clothing was found.
3. There is no evidence on the clothing of dragging or catching nor the presence of saliva. It was argued that the absence of saliva was not remarkable as a witness gave evidence of heavy rain in the area. The clothing was not subjected to heavy rain as there is evidence that heavy rain would have adversely affected the bloodstaining on the clothing and this is not the case. This lack of presence of saliva and dragging is inconsistent with a dingo carrying the body a distance of some four kilometres.
4. The jumpsuit was completely done up by studs to the neck which remained closed while the child was bleeding.
5. After the blood had dried the two top studs were undone prior to the clothing being buried whilst containing the body of the child.
6. There is evidence provided by fluorescent examination to suggest the presence of a palm print of a small adult right hand and some evidence of the presence of a left hand caused by a person holding the child when that person's hands were contaminated with wet blood.
7. Single holes or indentations which appear in the clothing could be consistent with teeth marks of an animal but the absence of tissue stains in conjunction with those holes make it inconsistent with an animal holding the body of the child. The evidence clearly establishes that the clothing has been cut and in places torn by a person or persons and in particular the cut on the collar was made after the bloodstaining had occurred, It was argued that one area of damage in the general area of the elbow may be consistent with an animal tearing, but the evidence is very strong that such a tearing by an animal would be inconsistent because of the lack of evidence of the presence of tissue staining which would inevitably be involved if an animal had caused the damage to the clothing.
8. Vegetation contamination on the clothing is inconsistent with vegetation found at the scene and inconsistent with the likely contamination which would have occurred if the clothing with a body in it had been carried by an animal. This supports the view that the vegetation contamination was caused by human intervention.
9. The clothes as found were not strewn around the area and this is inconsistent with an animal being responsible for their placement.
10. The clothing was found adjacent to a path near the base of a rock and adjacent to a dingo's lair.
11. Scissors were found in the Chamberlain's car on which there was present human fetal blood staining on the cutting edge and on the hinge areas. There is evidence to support that when comparable scissors are used to cut through blood that blood would be deposited on the cutting edge. An inference can be drawn that these scissors were used to cut the deceased's clothing. There is no weight to the argument that the subject scissors were unable to cut clothing as this was after the stud had been removed from the scissors to enable certain tests.

From this evidence it was concluded that both Chamberlains were implicated in covering their crime.

The prosecution's expert testimony for forensic evidence included that of James Cameron, a scientist who had also given crucial evidence in a case in England which was later overturned when his expert evidence was proved wrong. With regard to the timing of the baby's cry and Chamberlain's whereabouts, the prosecution also claimed that the Chamberlains convinced fellow camper and witness Sally Lowe to say that she heard Azaria cry after Chamberlain returned to the camp fire.

=== Evidence that a dingo took Azaria Chamberlain ===
Camper Sally Lowe and Michael Chamberlain gave evidence that they heard a baby cry at a time when Chamberlain was with them at the barbecue area and Azaria was thought to be in the family tent.

Witness Judith West, who was camped 30 metres (98 feet) away, testified to hearing a dog's low, throaty growl coming from that direction, a sound that she associated with growls her husband's dogs made when he was slaughtering sheep.

Chamberlain gave evidence that, in response to others hearing Azaria cry, she went to the tent. Halfway to the tent, she thought she saw a dingo emerging from the tent having difficulty getting out of the tent and shaking its head vigorously. Her view of its nose was obscured. She cried "Michael, Michael, the dingo's got my baby!" and ran into the tent to check on her children. Azaria was missing. She chased in the direction she thought it had gone, and called out to her husband for a torch.

Police Detective Sergeant John Lincoln gave evidence that he took photographs of large paw prints a few centimetres from Azaria's cot and found what was probably blood outside the tent. He collected samples but they were not tested.

Lowe also gave evidence that she had brought Reagan out of the tent after the occurrence. When she was in the tent she observed a pool of blood in the tent about 15 cm by 10 cm (6 by 4 inches). However, the amount of blood was disputed. Another witness who entered the tent that night, police Constable Frank Morris, gave evidence that there were only a few drops of blood on a couple of blankets and a sleeping bag in the tent.

A scientific witness located blood on the wall of the tent. Scientist Dr. Andrew Scott agreed that the spray mark of blood was consistent with a dingo carrying a bleeding baby. However, he did not believe that it was human blood. Canine hairs were located in the tent and on Azaria's jumpsuit. The Chamberlains did not own a dog.

Les Harris, then President of the Dingo Foundation, gave evidence that his opinion based on years of studying dingoes is that a dingo could have enveloped the head of a baby in its mouth and carried the weight of a baby over long distances. He produced photographs of dingoes enveloping the head of a baby-sized doll in its jaws. However, forensic expert Professor James Cameron gave evidence that, based on studying plaster casts of dingo jaws, it was impossible for a dingo to open its jaws wide enough to encompass a child's head.

Tourist Max Whittacker gave evidence that he attended a search later on the night of the disappearance with people including the head ranger and an Aboriginal tracker (known to be Nipper Winmarti). He claimed to have been called by the head ranger to help him and the Aboriginal tracker to follow dingo paw prints and scrape marks in the sand in a westerly direction. He was informed that they were following the trail of a dingo carrying a heavy object believed to be Azaria's body. He later stated, "I now know that the Aboriginal's account of following these tracks west that night has been denied by rangers and the Aboriginal's account of this incident has not been accepted."

Although expert opinion varied as to whether the clothes damage could have been caused by a dingo some took the view that it could have been. Further, marks on nappy fragments were similar to marks resulting from a dingo on another nappy that was used for testing purposes. Azaria's clothing was found only 30 metres (98 feet) from a dingo's den, although no one, including the chief ranger and his deputy, was aware of the den at the time.

=== Claims of human interference with clothes ===
Some evidence indicates human intervention between the time of discovery of Azaria's clothes and the time that the police photographed them.

Camper Wallace Goodwin, who was the first to discover the jumpsuit, singlet and nappy, gave evidence that the whole of the jumpsuit was undone, that the clothes were lying on the ground naturally not artificially, and that he believed the singlet was beside the jumpsuit not inside it. However, police Constable Frank Morris, the first police officer to examine the clothes after Goodwin located them, gave evidence that only the top four buttons were undone and the singlet was inside it. He stated that he picked up the clothes to check the inside for human remains and then returned it to the ground and photographed it. The singlet that had been placed back in the jumpsuit was inside out. Chamberlain gave evidence that she always ensured that singlets were not inside out.

=== Post-conviction ===
Shortly after her conviction, Chamberlain was escorted from Berrimah Prison under guard to give birth to her fourth child, Kahlia, on 17 November 1982, in Darwin Hospital, and was returned thereafter to prison. An appeal to the Federal Court against conviction was subsequently dismissed. Another appeal against her conviction was rejected by the High Court in February 1984.

=== Release on new evidence ===
Richard Morecroft introducing an ABC news report on the day of Lindy Chamberlain's release.

New evidence emerged on 2 February 1986 when Azaria's matinee jacket, which the police had maintained did not exist, was found partially buried adjacent to a dingo lair in an isolated location near Uluru. Five days later, on 7 February 1986, with the discovery of Azaria's missing jacket supporting the Chamberlains' defence case, Chamberlain was released from prison, and her life sentence was remitted by the Northern Territory Government. In 1987, a Royal Commission began investigating the matter further.

=== Morling Royal Commission ===
The purpose of the royal commission was to enquire into and report on the correctness of the Chamberlain convictions. In reaching the conclusion that there was a reasonable doubt as to the Chamberlains' guilt, Commissioner Trevor Morling concluded that the hypothesis that Chamberlain murdered Azaria had not been proven beyond reasonable doubt. Although the commission was of the opinion that the evidence afforded considerable support for the dingo hypothesis, it did not examine the evidence to see whether it had been proved that a dingo took the baby. To do so would, in the words of Morling, involve a "fundamental error of reversing the onus of proof and requiring Mrs Chamberlain to prove her innocence" (at p. 339 of the report).

== Acquittal ==
In acquitting the Chamberlains in 1988, the Supreme Court found that the alleged "baby blood" found in the Chamberlains' car, upon which the prosecution so heavily relied, could have been any substance, but was likely that of a sound deadening compound from a manufacturing overspray (which contained no blood). This finding underscored inconsistencies in the earlier blood testing, which, along with the later-recovered matinee jacket from a dingo lair area, had given rise to the Morling Royal Commission's doubts about the propriety of her conviction. The court also noted that as DNA testing was not advanced in the early 1980s, the expert testimony given by the prosecution at trial and relied on by the jurors was reasonable evidence at the time, even though it was ultimately found to be faulty.

=== Third inquest ===
After the Chamberlains were acquitted by the Supreme Court in September 1988 and their convictions overturned, a third inquest in 1995 took place, with the coroner's report stating that it was a "paper inquest" rather than a full inquest since there was little new evidence and the second inquest was never fully completed. The coroner considered the Morling Royal Commission's report enquiring into the correctness of the convictions against Chamberlain along with submissions made on behalf of the Chamberlains, and returned an open verdict in Azaria's cause of death, or, insufficient evidence by the prosecution that failed to meet the required standard of proof for conviction. Specifically, he wrote

After examining all the evidence I am unable to be satisfied on the balance of probabilities that Azaria Chamberlain died at the hands of Alice Lynne Chamberlain. It automatically follows that I am also unable to be satisfied on the balance of probabilities that Michael Leigh Chamberlain had any involvement in the death.

He also wrote that because the evidence for the death-by-dingo hypothesis was never developed, "I am unable to be reasonably satisfied that Azaria Chamberlain died accidentally as a result of being taken by a dingo." He noted that

Indeed, the evidence affords considerable support for the view that a dingo may have taken her. To examine the evidence to see whether it has been proved that a dingo took Azaria would be to make the fundamental error of reversing the onus of proof and requiring Mrs Chamberlain to prove her innocence.

=== 2012 inquest ===
The Chamberlains continued to push for a resolution to the investigation into the death of Azaria as being caused by one or more dingoes without human interference. A new inquest began in February 2012 and new figures on dingo attacks on Fraser Island were collated by the Queensland Government's Department of Environment and Resource Management and provided as evidence at the Azaria Chamberlain inquest. Coroner Elizabeth Morris said that the new evidence in relation to dingo attacks on infants and young children had helped convince her to reopen the investigation. After 32 years of intense media interest and public excoriation, the Chamberlains stated they remained unsatisfied with bare acquittal and presumed innocence, and were keen to finally, and definitively, determine how their daughter died. On 12 June 2012, an Australian coroner made a final ruling that a dingo took baby Azaria Chamberlain from a campsite in 1980 and caused her death. Morris apologised to the Chamberlain family while an amended death certificate was immediately made available to them.

== Court cases ==
- Chamberlain v R (Azaria Chamberlain case and Dingo case) High Court bail application, Brennan J, 2 May 1983.
- Chamberlain v R Full Court of the Federal Court, Bowen CJ, Forster & Jenkinson JJ, 29 April 1983.
- Chamberlain v R (No 2) High Court, Gibbs CJ, Mason, Murphy, Brennan & Deane JJ, 22 February 1984.
- Chamberlain v R (Acquittal decision) Reference Under S.433A of the Criminal Code by the Attorney-General for the Northern Territory of Australia of Convictions of Alice Lynne Chamberlain and Michael Leigh Chamberlain, Supreme Court of the Northern Territory, 15 September 1988.

== Subsequent life ==
Chamberlain published Through My Eyes: an autobiography in 1990. The Chamberlains divorced in 1991. On 20 December 1992, she married Rick Creighton, an American publisher and fellow member of the Seventh-day Adventist Church, and is now known as Lindy Chamberlain-Creighton. She and Creighton live in Australia. In 2007, Chamberlain spoke out in support of the parents of Madeleine McCann and said she would be willing to talk to the McCanns.

In August 2010, on the 30th anniversary of the death of Azaria, Chamberlain appealed on her website to have the cause of death amended on Azaria's death record. In 2012, the coroner's final report identified that a dingo was the cause of death.

== Film and other adaptations ==
In the 1983 Australian television movie about the case, The Disappearance of Azaria Chamberlain, Chamberlain was played by Elaine Hudson; the movie aired on Network Ten. In the 1988 film Evil Angels (released as A Cry in the Dark outside Australia and New Zealand) the role was played by Meryl Streep, whose performance received an Academy Award nomination for Best Actress in 1989. Miranda Otto played Chamberlain in the 2004 Australian television mini-series Through My Eyes: The Lindy Chamberlain Story, which aired on the Seven Network.

Australian composer Moya Henderson wrote the opera Lindy to a libretto by Judith Rodriguez. In 1990, the Rank Strangers' recording of their song "Uluru", which supported the Chamberlains and called for compensation to be paid to them, finished in the final five of the Australian Country Music Awards in Tamworth, New South Wales.

The line "the dingo ate my baby" or "the dingo's got my baby" was in many comedic shows in the United States, like The Simpsons, Seinfeld, and Frasier. The joke was usually making fun of the Australian accent, gaining a life outside of the case for most Americans.

In 2021, Australian drag queen Etcetera Etcetera portrayed Chamberlain on the Snatch Game episode of the first series of RuPaul's Drag Race Down Under. The performance was roundly criticised in the media and by fellow contestants for being in poor taste.

== See also ==
- List of miscarriage of justice cases
- Sally Clark, a British mother whose conviction for killing her two infant sons was overturned by medical evidence.
- Kathleen Folbigg – another case where supposedly incorrect maternal displays of grief resulted in a miscarriage of justice
- Maxine Robinson – UK serial killer mother convicted, in part due to the heavily criticized and discredited Meadow's law, around the same time as Clark and others were freed. The judge commented that the case was "a timely reminder that not all mothers in prison for killing their children are the victims of miscarriages of justice"
- Patty Stallings, an American woman who was wrongfully convicted of murder after the death of her son.
- Betty Tyson
