= Telfer mine =

Mine located at Telfer, Western Australia

Telfer Mine
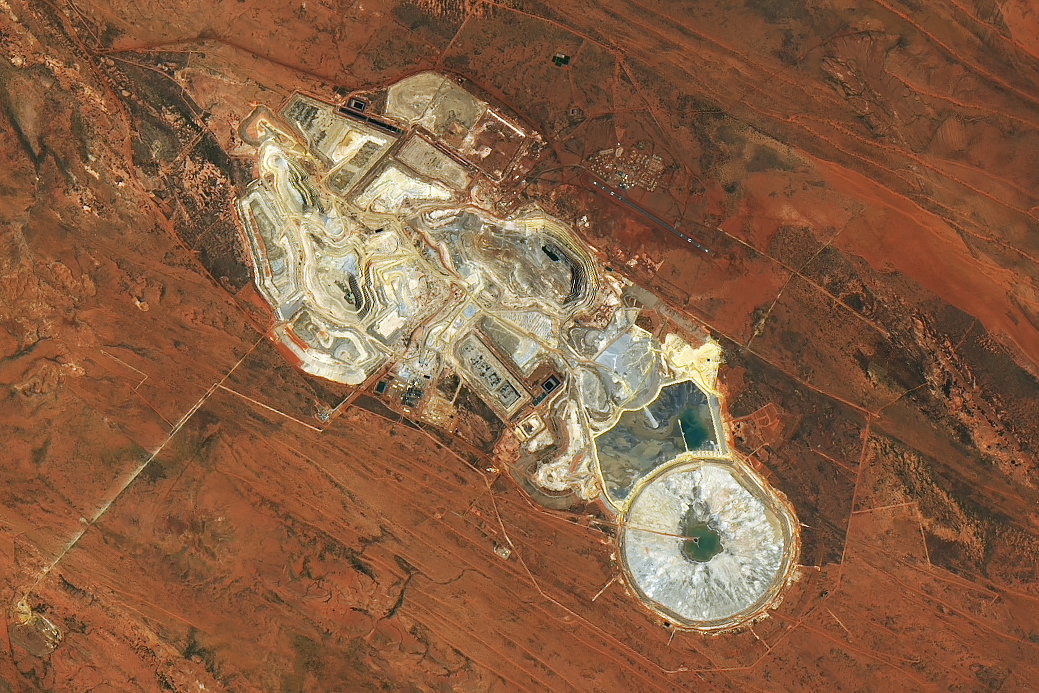
- Satellite picture of the mine in December 2023

- Location in Western Australia
- Interactive map of Telfer Mine
- Location: Telfer, Western Australia, Australia; 21°42′30″S 122°13′40″E
- Products: Gold, copper, silver
- Production: Gold: 349,000 troy ounces; Copper: 17,000 tonnes; Silver: 208,000 ounces
- Financial year: 2022–23
- Type: Underground, open pit
- Opened: 1977
- Active: 1977–2000, 2003–present
- Company: Greatland Gold
- Website: greatlandgold.com/assets/telfer/
- Acquired: 2024

The Telfer Mine is a gold, copper and silver mine located at Telfer on the land of the Martu people, in the Great Sandy Desert of Western Australia. It is owned by Greatland Gold, having been acquired from the previous owner, Newmont, in December 2024.

The mine was discovered by Newmont in 1972. However, Jean-Paul Turcaud, a French prospector, disputes this claim to this day.

In the 2019–2020 financial year, the Telfer mine produced 12.2 tonnes (393,164 troy ounces) of gold, 16,000 tonnes (35 million pounds) of copper and 5.1 tonnes (164,000 troy ounces) of silver.

At 31 December 2020, measured and indicated mineral resources were 110 tonnes (3.4 million troy ounces) of gold and 0.36 million tonnes (0.79 billion pounds) of copper, and proved and probable ore reserves were 34 tonnes (1.1 million troy ounces) of gold and 0.17 million tonnes (370 million pounds) of copper.

== History ==
=== Discovery ===
Western Australia Senator John Panizza believed that the Telfer mine may be the legendary Lasseter's Reef, a lost mine supposedly found either in 1911 or in 1897.

Newmont first made a claim to the deposit in 1972. However this claim is disputed by Jean-Paul Turcaud to this date. Turcaud claims he found the Telfer deposit two years before Newcrest did. In the early 1980s, Turcaud reached a settlement, accepting $25,000 from Newmont's head office in New York City but continued his claim, demanding a Royal Commission.

The official story of the discovery states that the deposit was found by Day Dawn Minerals, a small exploration company, who did not stake a claim either. One of the company's geologists, a man called Ronnie Thomson, then moved on to work for Newmont, in which position he informed David Tyrwhitt, then exploration manager for the company in Western Australia, about the promising gold samples that had been found. Newmont paid Day Dawn $15,000 for the maps of the deposit and Tyrwhitt staked out the claim in May 1972.

=== First mining period 1977 to 2000 ===
The mine opened in 1977 as a joint venture between BHP and Newmont. In 1990, a merger between BHP Gold and Newmont resulted in the creation of Newcrest, with ownership of the Telfer Mine now lying with Newcrest. The Telfer gold mine was expanded in 1991, and in June 1995, the mine reserves were 118.2 tonnes (3.8 million troy ounces), with resources at 227.1 tonnes (7.3 million troy ounces). The annual production was 11.5 to 11.8 tonnes (370,000 to 380,000 troy ounces) of ore. In 1997, the mine reached the milestone of having produced 155.5 tonnes (5 million troy ounces) of gold. Open cut mining was suspended in August 2000 due to high operating costs. The closure of the mine came one year ahead of schedule as production of underground ore was well below mill capacity and therefore not viable. High production costs were primarily caused by the presence of cyanide soluble copper in the open pit ore. Newcrest then focused on exploratory drilling for new minerals.

=== Second mining period from 2002 ===
In 2002, Newcrest Mining announced a new redevelopment project worth $1 billion, after discovering new mineral areas and a reserve base of some 591.0 tonnes (19 million troy ounces) of gold and 640 thousand tonnes (1.4 billion pounds) of copper. The redevelopment expanded underground mining areas, deepened open pits, constructed a processing plant and power station, and built a new gas supply line from Port Hedland. The Telfer mine is not connected to the Western Australian power grid but instead produces its own power from natural gas via a 450 kilometres (280 mi) purpose built pipeline. The power station on site is able to produce 138 MW of power. The focus changed from open pit mining to underground mining, and Telfer became one of Australia's largest gold mines, second only to Kalgoorlie's Super Pit until Boddington Gold Mine reopened in 2009.

The mine reopened in November 2004, after commissioning of the processing plant and, initially as an open cut mine, from March 2006 also with an underground operation.

In January 2008, Newcrest Mining lowered the mine's annual gold output targets. Newcrest said, "At Telfer, mechanical availability of the open pit mining fleet and the processing of harder ores are impacting the expected production profile for the full year. Telfer site cash costs are expected to [rise] over guidance by 8-9 per cent." In June, the mine was affected by the statewide gas crisis caused by an explosion at Varanus Island. The mine lost 622 to 778 kilograms (20 to 25 thousand troy ounces) of gold output for June. Newcrest obtained interim gas supply from Woodside Petroleum until August, when gas supply from Varanus Island resumed.

Newcrest was forced to cut job numbers from 1,400 to around 1,000 in late 2008, during the financial crises, to reduce costs.

Mining is carried out at the Main Dome open pit and the underground operations below. The West Dome pit is being mined again.

On 4 December 2013 a contractor was killed at the mine, being crushed by pipe work.

On 4 December 2024, Greatland Gold acquired a 100% stake in the mine.

== Production ==
Production figures for the mine:

=== Gold ===
Annual gold production of the mine:

Year	Production	Grade	Cost per ounce
1999	314,295 ounces	1.33 g/t	A$390
2000	176,000 ounces	1.62 g/t	A$494
2001–2003	inactive		
2004–05	218,000 ounces		
2005–06	650,000 ounces		
2006–07	627,000 ounces		
2007–08	590,000 ounces		
2008–09	629,108 ounces		
2009–10	688,909 ounces		
2010–11			
2011–12			
2012–13			
2013–14	536,342 ounces	0.90 g/t	$A1,005
2014–15	520,309 ounces	na g/t	$A791
2015–16	462,461 ounces	na g/t	$A967
2016–17	386,242 ounces	0.70 g/t	A$1,178
2017–18	425,536 ounces	0.71 g/t	A$1,262
2018–19	451,991 ounces	0.72 g/t	A$1,253
2019–20	393,164 ounces	0.90 g/t	A$1,281
2020–21	416,138 ounces	0.89 g/t	A$1,473
2021–22	407,550 ounces	0.73 g/t	A$1,388
2021–22	349,000 ounces		A$1,633

=== Copper ===
Annual copper production of the mine:

Year	Production	Grade	Cost
2004–05	25,000 tonnes		
2005–06	38,000 tonnes		
2006–07	28,000 tonnes		
2007–08	27,000 tonnes		
2008–09	32,905 tonnes		
2009–10	34,815 tonnes		
2010–11			
2011–12			
2012–13			
2013–14	43,619 tonnes	0.16%	
2014–15	23,119 tonnes	na%	
2015–16	18,940 tonnes	na%	
2016–17	20,136 tonnes	0.14%	
2017–18	16,212 tonnes	0.10%	
2018–19	15,025 tonnes	0.09%	
2019–20	16,278 tonnes	0.14%	
2020–21	13,177 tonnes	0.11%	
2021–22	13,904 tonnes	0.09%	
2022–23	17,000 tonnes		
