= Judith Rodriguez =

Australian poet (1936–2018)

Judith Rodriguez AM
- Born: Judith Catherine Green; 13 February 1936; Perth, Western Australia, Australia
- Died: 22 November 2018 (aged 82); Melbourne, Victoria, Australia
- Occupations: Poet, Academic
- Spouse(s): Fabio Rodriguez; Tom Shapcott
- Writing career
- Notable awards: 1994: Christopher Brennan Award

Judith Catherine Rodriguez AM (13 February 1936 — 22 November 2018) was an Australian poet. She was a recipient of the Christopher Brennan Award.

== Life ==
Rodriguez was born Judith Catherine Green in Perth and grew up in Brisbane. She was educated at Brisbane Girls Grammar School, and graduated from the University of Queensland with a Bachelor of Arts. She then travelled to England, where she received a Master of Arts from Cambridge University. Following this she took up a tutorship at Kingston University, Jamaica, where she met her first husband, Colombian academic Fabio Rodriguez.

She published numerous volumes of poetry, some illustrated by her own woodcuts, edited an anthology and the collected poems of Jennifer Rankin. From 1979 to 1982, she was poetry editor of the literary journal Meanjin, and from 1988 to 1997 she was a poetry editor with the publisher Penguin Australia. The play Poor Johanna, co-written with Robyn Archer, was produced in 1994 and her libretto for Moya Henderson's opera Lindy, about the Azaria Chamberlain disappearance, was performed at the Sydney Opera House in 2002. She was a recipient of the Christopher Brennan Award and taught at La Trobe University (1969–1985). In 1989 she took up a lectureship in writing at Victoria College, which in 1993 became part of Deakin University, where she continued to teach until her retirement in 2003. She was made a Member of the Order of Australia in 1994.

Rodriguez died on 22 November 2018. She is survived by her four children and their father, and by her second husband, Tom Shapcott, whom she married in 1982.

== Works ==
Poetry

- Four Poets (as Judith Green), with others. (Melbourne, Cheshire, 1962)
- Nu-Plastik Fanfare Red. (St. Lucia, University of Queensland Press, 1973)
- Broadsheet Number 23. (Canberra, Open Door Press, 1976)
- Water Life. (University of Queensland Press, 1976) ISBN 0-7022-1322-5 review
- Shadow on Glass. (Canberra: Open Door Press, 1978)
- Three Poems. (Melbourne, Old Metropolitan Meat Market, 1979)
- Angels. Melbourne, (Old Metropolitan Meat Market, 1979)
- Arapede. (Melbourne, Old Metropolitan Meat Market, 1979)
- Mudcrab at Gambaro's. (UQP, 1980) ISBN 0-7022-1573-2
- Witch Heart. (Melbourne: Sisters, 1982) ISBN 0-908207-64-6
- Floridian Poems. (Winter Park, Florida, Rollins College, 1986)
- The House by Water : New and Selected Poems. (1988) ISBN 0-7022-2138-4
- The Cold. Canberra, National Library of Australia (Pamphlets Poets), 1992
- The Hanging of Minnie Thwaites. (Melbourne, Arcade Publications, 2012) ISBN 978-0-9871714-0-5
- The Feather Boy & Other Poems (Sydney, Puncher and Wattmann, 2018) ISBN 9781925780079

Plays

- Poor Johanna (produced Adelaide, 1994 ). In Heroines, edited by Dale Spender. Melbourne, Penguin, 1991
- Lindy (opera libretto). Music by Moya Henderson.

Edited

- Mrs Noah and the Minoan Queen. (Melbourne: Sisters, 1983)
- Poems from the Australian's 20th Anniversary Competition. With Andrew Taylor, Sydney, Angus & Robertson, 1985
- Jennifer Rankin: Collected Poems. (UQP, 1990)
- The Collected Poems of Jennifer Rankin. St. Lucia, University of Queensland Press. 1990

=== Selected list of poems ===
Title	Year	First published	Reprinted/collected in
"In-Flight Note"	1985	The Age, 9 February 1985	The House by Water : New and Selected Poems, University of Queensland Press, 1988, p51
