= Moya Henderson =

Australian composer (born 1941)

Moya Patricia Henderson AM (born 2 August 1941 in Quirindi, New South Wales) is an Australian composer.

A graduate of the University of Queensland, Henderson was Resident Composer at Opera Australia during their first season at the Sydney Opera House in 1973. In the mid-1970s, Henderson studied composition with Karlheinz Stockhausen and music-theatre with Mauricio Kagel at the Cologne Musikhochschule. Henderson's compositions include such pieces as the work for organ and pre-recorded tape, Sacred Site (1983), The Dreaming written for the Australian Chamber Orchestra, "Six Urban Songs: The Patrick White Song Cycle" for soprano and orchestra (1983), and an opera, Lindy (1997), with Judith Rodriguez (as co-librettist), based on the disappearance of baby Azaria Chamberlain at Uluru in 1980. The mother, Lindy Chamberlain, was tried for the murder of the child. The opera documents the travesty of justice as it was meted out to Lindy Chamberlain and her then husband, Michael. It premiered at the Sydney Opera House in 2002.

== Early career ==
In 1973, after being appointed resident composer to the Australia Opera during inaugural season at the Sydney Opera House, Henderson was awarded a DAAD Scholarship and a travel grant to the Music Board from the Music Board of Australia Council for the Arts. There, she continued her musical education in Germany then returned to Australia towards the end of 1976 to teach composition as a part-time lecturer at the University of Sydney. In 1978, she became resident composer in the Department of Music, and in a three-year span, she worked to stimulate the interest of students in music-theatre by encouraging them to create their own music-theatre compositions.

== Works ==
Henderson did not focus on one style of composition. Her works ranged from chamber music, instrumental music, vocal music, choral music, electronic music, and vocal ensemble music, sometimes covered in different musical versions. Some of her most recognised works are 'Sorry time: cello solo' (1999), 'The Beloved awaits: brass quintet (2008), 'Ku-ring-gai Chase: full orchestra' (1999), 'G'day USA 1: horn solo' (2003), and 'Yapu vudlandta: fate, clarinet, and piano' (2004).

=== Inventions ===
In the mid-seventies while in Germany, she received a commission from sculptor Helfried Hagenberg to compose music on a sculpture he had created from twenty-seven triangles. During the course of her commission, she developed the alemba, a keyboard percussion instrument. She is also the inventor of the Tosca Bells, a percussion instrument with hollow metal tubes that create a vibrating bell-like sound when hit. She also developed the 'noose' for stringed instruments that enables the composer to write 'natural' harmonics on virtually every note within the range of the string orchestra.

== Awards ==
Throughout her career, Henderson has been nominated in both musical and theatrical industries. In 1974, Henderson won the Kranichsteiner Prize for best composition in a music theatre piece. For developing the alemba instrument, she was awarded one of the inaugural CSIRO Artist-in Residence Fellowships in November 1983. In 1993, Henderson was awarded the Don Banks Music award, and was made a Member of the Order of Australia in the 1996 Australia Day Honours for her service as a composer.

=== Don Banks Music Award ===
The Don Banks Music Award was established in 1984 to publicly honour a senior artist of high distinction who has made an outstanding and sustained contribution to music in Australia. It was founded by the Australia Council in honour of Don Banks, Australian composer, performer and the first chair of its music board.

Year	Nominee / work	Award	Result
1993	Moya Henderson	Don Banks Music Award	Won
