= Dingo attack =

Australian animal attack

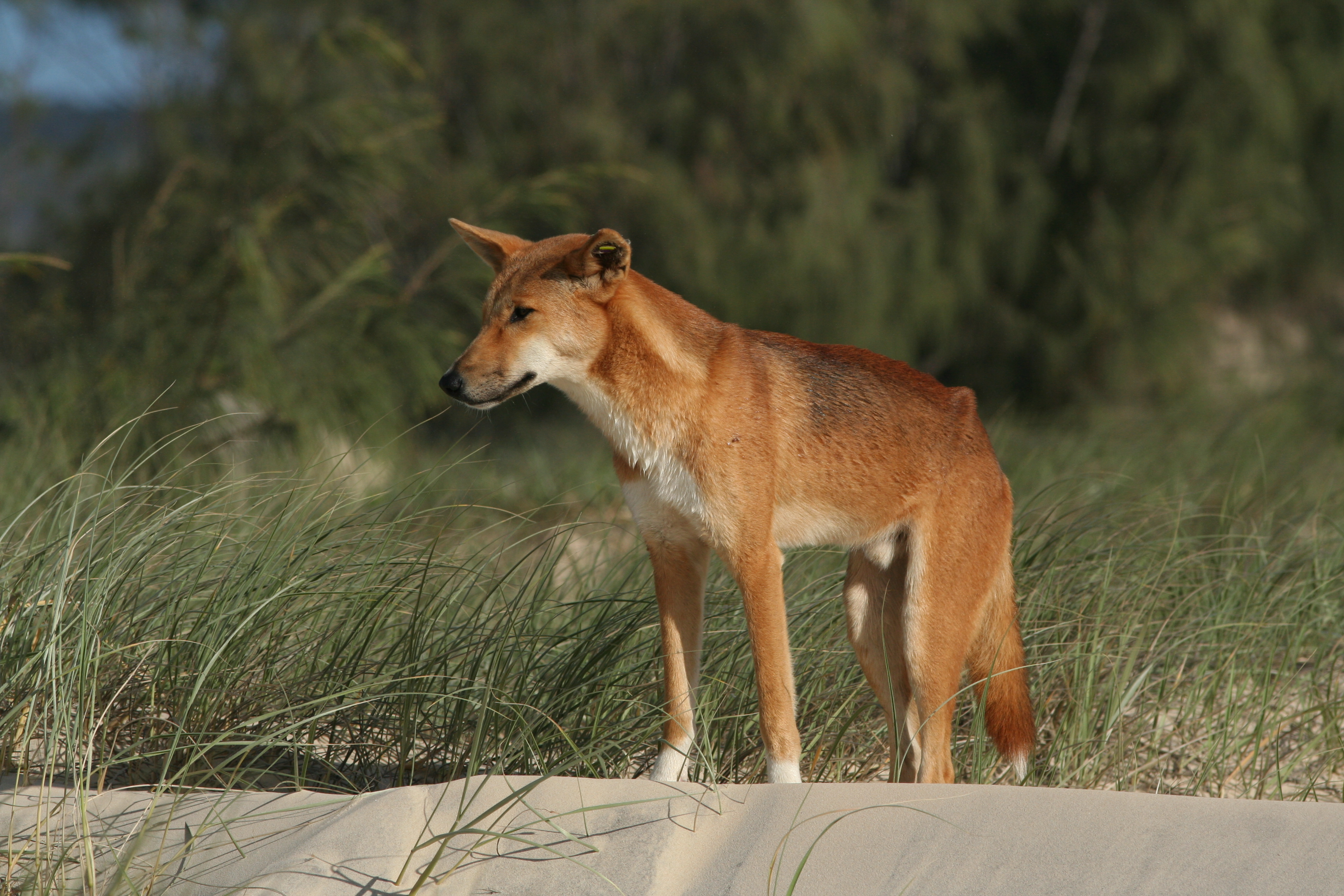
A dingo on K'gari in Queensland

Attacks by dingos on humans are rare in Australia, but there have been an increasing number of attacks recorded in the 21st century. These have mostly occurred on the island of K'gari (formerly Fraser Island) off the coast of Queensland, where increasing tourism has brought more humans into contact with the longstanding dingo population there.

== Overview ==
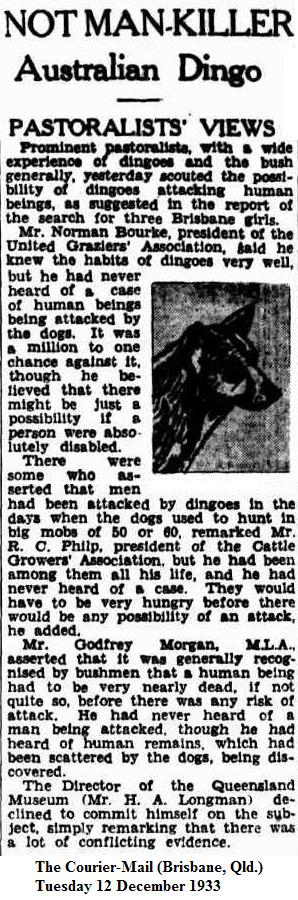
Pastoralists views on the possibility of dingo attacks in connection with the disappearance of three girls in Brisbane in 1933

Dingoes are a danger to livestock, especially to sheep and young cattle. Dingo attacks on livestock are fairly common occurrences and a serious concern for the Australian livestock industry. The 5,614-kilometre-long (3,488 mi) Dingo Fence was constructed in Southeast Australia to protect the livestock there from attacks.

Wild dogs are fairly large predators, but are much smaller than able-bodied adults and therefore not generally much of a threat to them. However, they can be a serious threat to incapacitated, isolated, outnumbered, or very small humans, especially infants and young children. Dingo attacks have most frequently occurred on young children and small teenagers.

Humans and dingoes generally tend to avoid each other. In some situations, however, such as on K'gari and some locations in the Northern Territory, close interaction between dingoes and humans, especially feeding dingoes, has led to dangerous habituation and attacks.

== Causes ==
The likelihood of wild dog attacks on humans depends to a large degree on how humans behave toward them. The more frequently these dogs are fed or scavenge human leftovers, the more likely it is that they lose all caution and sometimes react aggressively towards humans when they perceive themselves to be in conflict with the human. During a study on K'gari dingoes, the researchers reasoned that the presence of humans influences the activity of dingoes. The tourism industry on the island encouraged people to approach dingoes without caution, and such encounters were practically expected by the tourists. People lost their caution when dealing with dingoes more and more frequently, and the number of reported interactions increased. The way the dingoes reacted towards humans was dependent on the way humans behaved toward them. Dingoes tended to show aggressive behaviour when humans fled, and tended to be intimidated when humans consciously or aggressively moved towards them. Humans making submissive postures seemed to cause a neutral or submissive reaction of the dingoes. That dingoes showed aggressive behaviour towards humans seemed to be similarly likely during different times of the year. However, adult dingoes might be more dangerous during the breeding season, and female dingoes especially when they raise their pups.

Even when habituation to humans seems to be the cause for attacks, it is not clear what the ultimate cause for attacks and overall threat towards humans is. It is possible that some attacks result from the "play" of young pups, especially with children. Attacks can also be caused by false reactions of humans to aggressive and dominance behaviour of dingoes. It is assumed that dingoes might have started to regard "human" food sources (garbage cans, leftovers, handouts, etc.) as part of their territory and that attacks on humans can therefore occur because the dingoes see humans as competitors and want to protect their food sources. That some dingoes might regard humans as prey was also deemed possible because humans, especially children, could be theoretically overpowered.

Bradley Smith, who had been researching wild dog behaviour at Central Queensland University said in 2013 that K'gari has a problem with humans and not with the dingoes, that dogs who were labelled "aggressive" were simply behaving naturally.

The behaviour of humans might undermine efforts to guard against dingo attacks. Therefore, the change in human behaviour is at the centre of attention. Warning signs like "Beware of Dingoes" seem to have lost their effect on K'gari, despite the high number of such signs. Furthermore, some humans do not realise how adaptive and quick dingoes are. Therefore, humans do not remain attentive enough. They do not consider, for instance, that dingoes steal food like fruits and vegetables. In addition, some tourists seemed to be confused by the high number of rules in some parks, and they have been prompted in some cases to actively feed the wild animals.

== Attacks on humans ==
For a long time it was widely believed that dingoes did not attack humans. This attitude was not challenged until after the disappearance of Azaria Chamberlain. Almost all fatalities reportedly caused by dingeos before 1928 are difficult to corroborate, as they often involve an individual entering bushland alone and then having their remains discovered some time after having been predated by dingoes, or involve toddlers and infants who were not being supervised when the attack is reported to have happened. One of the earliest cases of a dingo attack which was witnessed, was on 7 July 1891, when a dingo took a toddler who was playing nearby its mother.

In December 1933, when three girls went missing near Mount Coot-tha, the possibility of their having been attacked by dingoes was considered. Local livestock men who live and work among dingoes all their lives, said that they had no direct knowledge of any dingo attacks on humans, but from what they knew of the animal, they reasoned that a starving dingo would attack a defenseless human. Some had heard of human remains found scattered by dingoes. Scholarly experts couldn't comment due to contradictory evidence. The three girls were found unharmed two days later. Dingoes played no part in their disappearance.

The first well-documented case of a dingo attack on K'gari is from 1988, though reports of dingo attacks on the island can be traced back to 1836. Between 1996 and 2001, 279 incidents with dingoes were reported, of which 39 were assessed as "major" and one as "catastrophic".

Three reports of dingo attacks on humans caused special attention:

- On 19 August 1980 a nine-week-old girl named Azaria Chamberlain was taken by one or more dingoes near Uluru. Her mother was suspected and convicted of murder. Four years later she was released from prison when the jacket of the baby was found near Uluru. This incident caused much outcry for and against the dingoes. The story was adapted into a film named Evil Angels (also known as A Cry in the Dark) starring Meryl Streep. In 2012 a coroner concluded that sufficient evidence existed to confirm a dingo attack as cause of Azaria Chamberlain's death.
- On 30 April 2001 nine-year-old Clinton Gage was attacked and killed by two dingoes near Waddy Point on Fraser Island (K'gari). The incident and the following culling of 31 dingoes caused much outcry among the residents. There were many protests and the suggestion was made to erect fences. The incident seemed to have had only a low impact on the tourism industry, and some tourists even felt safer due to the increased presence of rangers.
- In November 2012, a six-month-old dingo known as Inky was killed by rangers on K'gari after continued aggressive and dangerous behaviour towards people. The threatening behaviour included "lunging" at a family, coming out of the bushland at high speed towards volleyball players, and grabbing two tourists on separate occasions with his mouth, not breaking the skin on either occasion. Rangers attempted to trap the dangerous dingo for a month before they were successful. The captured animal was then euthanised. One Dingo advocacy group argued that, as a juvenile, the dingo's aggressive behaviours would be considered normal for his young age. Soon after, Inky's brother Byron was killed by rangers, although his documented incidents never reached the serious Code E level that his brother's had.

=== List of attacks on humans ===
Below is a list of dingo attacks and alleged dingo attacks that occurred in Australia, in reverse chronological order.

Victim(s)	Date	Location	Description
Piper James, 19-year-old woman	19 January 2026	K'gari, Queensland	Canadian tourist Piper James drowned at K'gari and her body was found surrounded by dingos. A preliminary coroner's report in January 2026 concluded that she had been bitten by dingos before, as well as after, her death by drowning.
Woman, 20's	17 July 2023	K'gari, Queensland	A woman was attacked by four dingoes while jogging at Orchid Beach on K'gari. She was flown by rescue helicopter to Hervey Bay Hospital, having suffered bite wounds to her limbs and torso.
Boy, 10	16 June 2023	K'gari, Queensland	A ten-year-old boy was attacked and dragged into the water by a dingo, which then attempted to drown the boy by holding his head under the water. The boy was rescued by his twelve-year-old sister.
Boy, 4	2 June 2023	Karijini National Park, Western Australia	A four-year-old boy was bitten on the leg by a dingo at Dales Campground.
Woman	Late April or May 2023	K'gari, Queensland	A French tourist was bitten on the buttocks by a dingo. Footage of the incident was widely circulated in the media.
Woman, 20s	30 April 2023	K'gari, Queensland	A woman received treatment for puncture wounds to her upper leg after being bitten by a dingo at Eli Creek.
Boy, 2	14 April 2023	Karijini National Park	A two-year-old boy was attacked by a dingo at Dales Campground at Karijini National Park and suffered serious injuries.
Girl, 6	3 April 2023	K'gari, Queensland	A six-year-old girl was attacked by a dingo while she played in a shallow lagoon at Waddy Point. The dingo attempted to drown the girl by holding her head underwater. Family members were able to rescue the girl.
Boy, 5	18 December 2022	K'gari, Queensland	A five-year-old boy was attacked by a dingo near the Ocean Lake camping area on K'gari and suffered injuries to his arm, buttocks and head before his father was able to chase the dingo away.
Boy, 2	17 April 2021	K'gari, Queensland	A two-year-old boy wandered away from a house at Orchid Beach while his family was asleep and was attacked, suffering wounds to his leg, arm, the base of his neck, and his shoulder, and a laceration at the base of his head.
Boy, 8	4 February 2021	K'gari, Queensland	An eight-year-old boy and his father were at Orchid Beach and walking past a pack of dingoes when one of the juveniles got up and started walking towards the boy, who stumbled in the sand and fell over. The dingoes then advanced on the boy, but were scared away by the father.
Boy, 14 months old	18 April 2019	K'gari, Queensland	A dingo entered a family's camper trailer under its canvas and dragged the child out while the family was asleep. The screams of the child alerted the father, who gave chase, rescued the child, and scared off a number of other dingoes. The child was airlifted to Hervey Bay Hospital with deep lacerations to the back of the neck and head as well as a fractured skull.
Boy, 9, and woman, 24	28 February 2019	K'gari, Queensland	A nine-year-old boy was returning to his campsite from an afternoon swim with his family when they were approached and attacked by 2 dingoes. The boy suffered serious injuries, including lacerations to his arms and legs and a bite mark to his face. The same dingoes also attacked his 24-year-old mother as she tried to protect him, causing "deep injuries" to her arms and legs. Both were airlifted to Sunshine Coast University Hospital.
Boy, 6	19 January 2019	K'gari, Queensland	A female dingo and her 3 sub-adult offspring attacked a six-year-old boy when he ran up a sand dune near the Govi Camping Ground, south of Eurong. He was airlifted to the hospital and treated for puncture wounds and scratches to his legs.
Debbie Rundle, 54	18 July 2018	Telfer, Western Australia	While eating lunch, Rundle was attacked by three dingoes. Her leg was severely injured, requiring major surgery.
2 unnamed women in 20s or 30s	26 October 2014	K'gari, Queensland	Two Australian women were bitten while jogging; one of the women was hospitalised.
A family, other unnamed tourists	November 2012	K'gari, Queensland	A six-month-old dingo was killed by rangers on K'gari after continued aggressive and dangerous behaviour towards people. The dangerous behaviour included "lunging" at a family, coming out of the bushland at high speed towards volleyball players, and grabbing two tourists on separate occasions with his mouth, not breaking the skin on either occasion. Rangers attempted to trap the dingo for a month. Once captured, the animal was euthanised. One dingo advocacy group argued that, as a juvenile, the dingo's aggressive behaviours were considered normal. Soon after, the dingo's brother was killed by rangers, although documented incidents for this dog never reached the serious Code E level his brother's had.
Girl, 13	15 July 2012	Jabiru inside Kakadu National Park, Northern Territory	A Victorian girl woke up to a dingo dragging her sleeping bag. She was sleeping on a mattress outside her family's caravan.
Girl, 3	26 April 2011	K'gari, Queensland	A three-year-old girl was attacked on K'gari by two dingoes. She suffered serious puncture wounds to her leg.
Woman	21 April 2009	Stuart Highway near Devils Marbles, Northern Territory	Michelle Robson, a nurse who had just left a job at Alice Springs Hospital, was travelling with her partner Ihab Hassan when their car left the road and Robson was injured. Hassan moved Robson to the shade of a tree and went to get help. While he was gone, Robson used a stick to fend off a dingo that attacked her, and was bitten on the hand.
Girl, 4	April 2007	K'gari, Queensland	A young girl was severely bitten.
Girl, 4	September 2006	K'gari, Queensland	A four-year-old girl was bitten on the stomach by a dingo as she played in shallow water near Eurong.
Woman	March 2003	K'gari, Queensland	A British woman was bitten by a dingo and sustained a slight bruise and grazing.
Clinton Gage, 9-year-old male	April 2001	Near Waddy Point on K'gari, Queensland	Clinton Gage was attacked and killed. The incident and the resultant killing of 31 dingoes caused a large outcry among the residents. There were many protests and the suggestion was made to erect fences.
Woman, 63	February 1999	K'gari, Queensland	A 63-year-old German tourist was mauled by two dingoes as she lay sunbathing at Lake McKenzie.
Girl, 13-month-old	4 April 1998	K'gari, Queensland	A dingo snatched a 13-month-old baby from the Waddy Point camping ground and dragged her for two metres before her father rescued her. It was one of two separate dingo attacks which occurred on the same day.
Girl, 3	4 April 1998	K'gari, Queensland	A three-year-old Norwegian girl was attacked by a dingo while she and her family camped at Lake McKenzie. It was one of two separate dingo attacks that occurred on the same day.
Two women	March 1998	K'gari, Queensland	Two British backpackers were attacked by a dingo while washing camping utensils in the sea. One of the women was bitten 14 times and was hospitalised.
Boy, 5	19 March 1997	K'gari, Queensland	A five-year-old Gympie boy was injured when he was attacked by two dingoes while playing hide and seek with his younger sister near the dining area of Eurong resort.
Azaria Chamberlain, 2-month-old	August 1980	Uluru, Northern Territory	Azaria Chamberlain's mother Lindy Chamberlain was initially convicted of murdering Azaria, but was later exonerated. In 2012 the official verdict was amended to state that Azaria was killed by dingoes.
Girl, 4	1979	Darwin, Northern Territory	A four-year-old girl was attacked by another person's pet dingo after it escaped from the chain it was tethered to. She suffered multiple puncture wounds and scarring. The girl was awarded $5110 in damages.
Lyall Fuller, adult male	September 1942	near Woolgoolga, New South Wales	Fuller believed he had shot a dingo dead, but when he walked over, it "sprang to its feet and flew at him". He then clubbed it to death with his rifle, before dismembering it and using it as lobster bait. He stated that "the dingo had her pups hidden nearby and this apparently was the reason for the violence of the attack".
Ted Worth, adult male	September 1942	near Glen Innes, New South Wales	Worth was "savaged" by a dingo that had been caught in a rabbit trap.
Gordon Philp, adult male	October 1938	Boonah, Queensland	Philip found a "large dingo" attacking his calf and was then pursued by the dingo into a creek. He forced it underwater until it drowned.
Gilbert Hamilton, adult male	September 1936	Bilambil, New South Wales	Hamilton fended off the attack with a sack of bananas, then threw stones to scare the dingo away.
Ian Pollard, 3-year-old male	January 1935	Hillview, Queensland	Pollard was bitten on the forehead, requiring stitches. The dingo had escaped from captivity.
George Cox and two other adult men	May 1928	Merewether, New South Wales	Cox was attacked by a pack of seven dingoes while returning from fishing. He fended off the attack with a stick and climbed up a tree. He was eventually found by two other men searching for him, whom the dingoes also attacked.
Teenage boy	December 1927	Nambour, Queensland	A farmer's son searching for missing sheep was attacked by four or five dingoes. He was rescued without injury when his screams were heard.
Edgar Tighe, 3-year-old male	January 1916	Dangar, Queensland	Tighe was found dead with "one leg bitten off either by foxes or dingoes".
John Pallier, adult male	September 1909	Illawarra Range, New South Wales	Pallier spent the night in a tree after being attacked by a pack of dingoes, who continued to stalk him for several days.
Moran, adult male	April 1888	Saddler's Creek, New South Wales	Moran was attacked by a group of dingoes while walking through a paddock.
Woman	c. 1884	Dawson River, Queensland	A young cattlewoman attempting to rescue cattle from dingoes, was herself attacked by two dingoes. The dingoes tore off her skirt, but she was able to take refuge in a tree.
H.J.C, adult human	c. 1881	Mount Drummond, South Australia	While camping alone an adult known only as H.J.C. claimed they were surrounded by a pack of 20 dingoes. The dingoes made repeated rushes at them, and H.J.C. was only able to keep them at bay with fire.
Willie Gesch, 5-year-old male	14 December 1880	Munna Creek, Queensland	Willie's mother had left Willie alone for no more than ten minutes, to drive cattle, when she heard a scream coming from the homestead. Willie could not be found when she returned. Of not was that Willie had an injured foot and, it is claimed, could not have wandered on his own. The Maryborough Chronicle wrote that unusaully bold dingoes had been seen attacking pigs in the area only two days prior, and that dingoes had been seen on the Gesch farm earlier that day. Some media at the time thus alleged that a dingo attack had taken place. In February 1981, amid media coverage on Azaria Chamberlain's disappearance, Willie Gesch's last surviving sibling, Eliza O'Keefe (born 23 years after Willie's disappearance), claimed she had been told by their parents that Willie was not taken by a dingo.
One adult male, and two male children	17 September 1876	Thompson's Swamp	Two male children were chased by two dingoes up a tree. Police Inspector Lloyd, Trooper Amies, and one unnamed adult male attempted to rescue the boys. The unnamed adult male was bitten by one of the dingoes on the thigh. The two police officers then opened fire, killing one dingo and injuring the other.
Young girl	c. 1870	Bourke, New South Wales	A young girl was attacked and severely injured by dingoes. In the aftermath of the attack all dogs owned by local aboriginal people were culled.
Girl, 12	c. 1845	Cuppacumbalong Homestead, present-day ACT	A 12-year-old girl was found to have been killed and eaten by dingoes after running away from home. The occurrence was reported by John Gale in a 1927 book about the history of Canberra, and by Samuel Shumack in his autobiography published posthumously in 1967.
Mr. Guise, adult male	November 1844	Bushland near Melbourne, Victoria	A man named Guise rode his horse into bushland outside Melbourne while intoxicated. His body was found partially eaten by dingoes. The Geelong Advertiser claimed he had fallen from his horse and was then attacked by dingoes.
John Baxter, 23-year-old male	1836	K'gari, Queensland	While shipwrecked on K'gari, British castaway John Baxter claimed he was attacked and bitten by a dingo. No motivation for the attack, or any further details about it, were given.
Adult male	February 1805	Botany Bay, New South Wales	A man was attacked by a pair of dingoes while walking alone in bushland. The dingoes chased him up a tree, where he remained for seven or eight hours, before the dingoes lost interest.
2 or 3-year-old male	8 July 1804	Prospect, New South Wales	A toddler, aged 2 or 3, wandered from a family farm. His body was found "more than half devoured". Media reports of the time disagree as to whether the boy was attacked by dingoes or drowned in pond at nearby Toongabbie.

== Attacks on other animals ==
Dingos frequently prey on sheep, goats and cattle when they have the chance. Because of this, the Dingo Fence, one of the longest structures in the world, was constructed to limit dingo migration into agricultural regions. Cattle are usually quite capable of defending themselves against dog attacks and the losses for cattle owners are therefore usually low, but sheep are extremely vulnerable and their behaviour in the presence of a predator can often lead to surplus killing. Some notable dingo attacks on animals which have appeared in reliable sources:

Type and number of animal/s attacked	Date	Species	Location, comments
Domestic dogs	December 2011	dingo	Marrara in the northern suburbs of Darwin, Northern Territory, two dogs taken by a dingo or dingoes in two days.
young calf	July 2009	dingo	Kawana Forest near Caloundra, pair of young dingoes killed the calf
£1000 worth of sheep	1941–8	dingo	Tumbarumba, 13yo dingo "weighed 100 lb. and measured six feet from tip to tip."
at least 1000 sheep	1942	dingo	Captain's Flat
200+ sheep	1939	dingo	Billa Billa near Goondiwindi
"many sheep"	1937	Alsatian-dingo cross	Oranmeir near Braidwood
10 wallabies	1936	dingo	Melbourne Zoo
300 sheep	1933	dingo	Benalla
sheep, goats, cattle	1924	dingo	Lake Nash district, dingoes described as being extremely numerous and troublesome
600+ sheep	years before 1916	dingo	Between Deepwater and "Dundee River" (Dundee?)

== See also ==
- Coyote attack
- Dog attack
- Wolf attack
