= Telfer, Western Australia =

Telfer
- Town
- Interactive map of Telfer
- Coordinates: 21°42′30″S 122°13′40″E
- Country: Australia
- State: Western Australia
- LGA: Shire of East Pilbara
- Location: 1,900 km (1,200 mi) from Perth; 450 km (280 mi) from Port Hedland

Government
  - State electorate: Pilbara
  - Federal division: Durack

Area
  - Total: 177,847.9 km^{2} (68,667.5 sq mi)
- Elevation: 292 m (958 ft)

Population
  - Total: 657 (SAL 2021)
- Postcode: 6762
- Mean max temp: 34.2 °C (93.6 °F)
- Mean min temp: 19.6 °C (67.3 °F)
- Annual rainfall: 366.9 mm (14.44 in)

Telfer is a minesite and company town in the Pilbara region of Western Australia, within the Great Sandy Desert. It is the state's most isolated town and is located 1,300 kilometres (808 mi) north-east of the state capital Perth. The gold, copper, and silver mine is one of the largest gold mines in Australia.

== History ==
Newmont first made a claim to the deposit in 1972; however, this is disputed by Jean-Paul Turcaud to this date.

A company town to support the mine was built by Newmont in 1976 and named after A. H. Telfer, former Western Australian Under Secretary for Mines. The town grew to a peak of almost 1,000 inhabitants in the early 1990s, with services such as a supermarket, a police station, a bank, a community hall, a library and a number of sporting facilities being available.

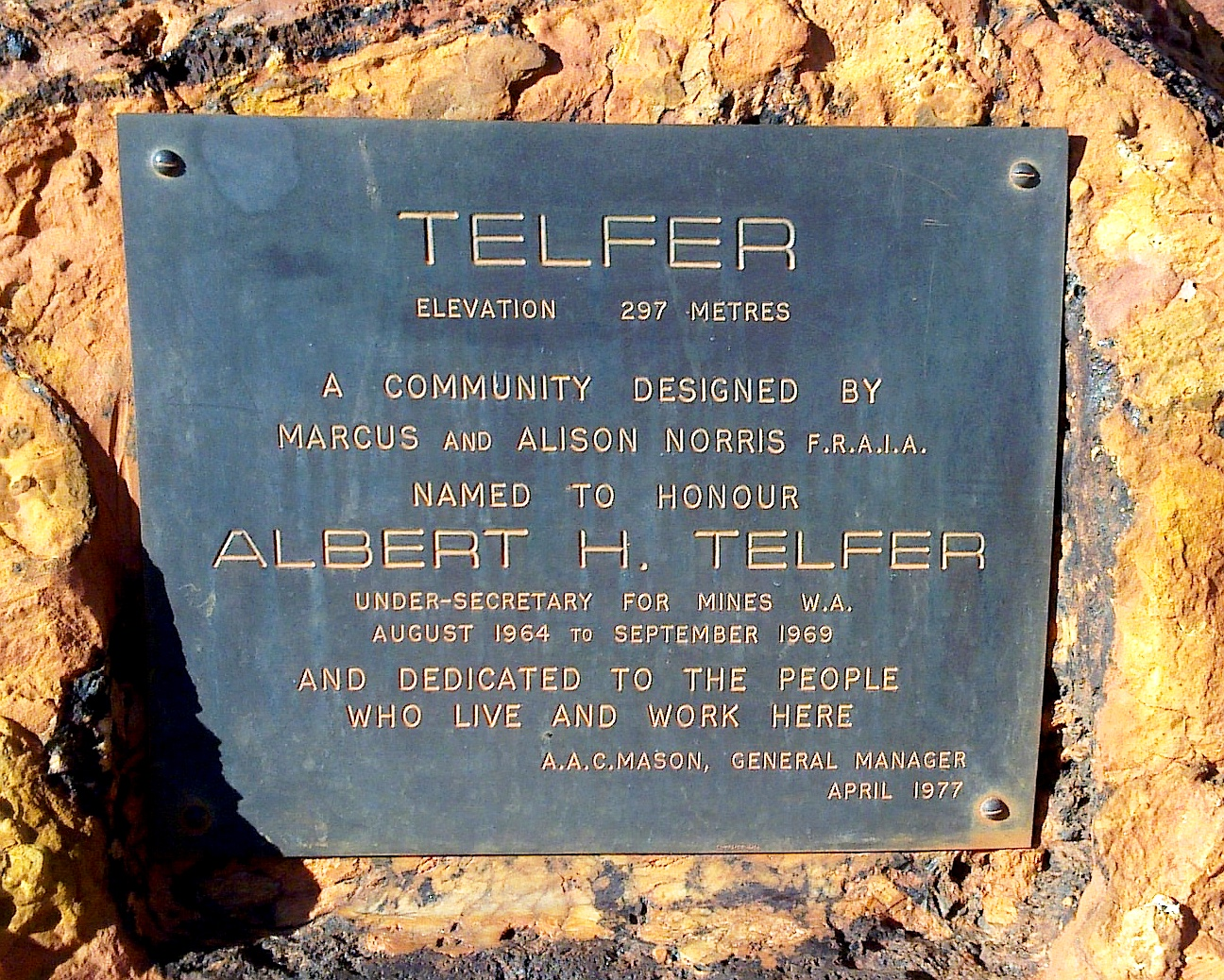
Plaque at Telfer, Western Australia

The mine opened in 1977 as a joint venture between BHP and Newmont. In 1990, a merger between BHP Gold and Newmont resulted in the formation of Newcrest, with ownership of the Telfer mine lying with Newcrest.

Telfer's demographic characteristics were typical of a northern Western Australian mining town in the time period. It had a male to female ratio of 2.4 to 1 and almost 40 percent of its population was born overseas. Half its population was below the age of 35 and the town experienced an annual population turnover of almost 20 percent.

In 1996, the town suffered from the decision to move the Telfer mine from residential to a fly-in fly-out workforce. Many of the commercial services were withdrawn; only the recreational facilities were maintained. The existing housing was now used for the accommodation of the mine's mobile work force. One of the main reasons for the town's closure was that fly-in fly-out rosters gave the mine access to a larger skilled work force and to people that would otherwise have been unwilling to relocate to a remote location like Telfer.

Open-cut mining was suspended in August 2000 due to high operating costs. High production costs were primarily caused by the presence of cyanide soluble copper in the open pit ore.

In 2002, Newcrest announced a new redevelopment project worth $1 billion, after discovering new mineral areas and a reserve base of some 591 tonnes (19 million troy ounces) of gold and 640 thousand tonnes (1.4 billion pounds) of copper. The mine reopened in November 2004, after commissioning of the processing plant and, initially as an open cut mine, from March 2006 also with an underground operation.

In July 2018, a woman on her lunch break at the Telfer Mine was attacked by a dingo. The injuries required surgery.

On 4 December 2024, Greatland Gold acquired a 100% stake in the mine.

== Climate ==
Telfer has a hot arid climate (Köppen BWh) with sweltering summers and very warm winters. Summer highs average at 40 °C (104 °F) and winter highs at 25 °C (77 °F). These very high temperatures mean that the climate is classed as arid despite receiving around 370 millimetres or 15 inches of rainfall per year. Telfer's location near the hot Indian Ocean leaves the community vulnerable to tropical cyclones. For example, Cyclone Graham affected the area in early 2003, delivering 163 millimetres (6.4 in) of rain. Severe Tropical Cyclone Laurence also passed over the mine site in December 2009.

Climate data for Telfer Aero
Month	Jan	Feb	Mar	Apr	May	Jun	Jul	Aug	Sep	Oct	Nov	Dec	Year
Record high °C (°F)	48.1 (118.6)	47.1 (116.8)	46.3 (115.3)	42.3 (108.1)	38.0 (100.4)	33.9 (93.0)	33.4 (92.1)	38.7 (101.7)	41.3 (106.3)	44.3 (111.7)	46.0 (114.8)	47.9 (118.2)	48.1 (118.6)
Mean daily maximum °C (°F)	40.3 (104.5)	38.9 (102.0)	37.6 (99.7)	34.6 (94.3)	29.1 (84.4)	25.5 (77.9)	25.6 (78.1)	28.6 (83.5)	33.0 (91.4)	37.4 (99.3)	39.5 (103.1)	40.5 (104.9)	34.2 (93.6)
Mean daily minimum °C (°F)	26.1 (79.0)	25.5 (77.9)	24.3 (75.7)	20.7 (69.3)	15.4 (59.7)	12.0 (53.6)	10.7 (51.3)	12.7 (54.9)	16.7 (62.1)	21.2 (70.2)	23.7 (74.7)	25.7 (78.3)	19.6 (67.3)
Record low °C (°F)	17.2 (63.0)	17.0 (62.6)	14.4 (57.9)	11.5 (52.7)	5.6 (42.1)	2.1 (35.8)	2.1 (35.8)	2.5 (36.5)	6.2 (43.2)	10.2 (50.4)	13.0 (55.4)	16.5 (61.7)	2.1 (35.8)
Average rainfall mm (inches)	63.7 (2.51)	95.9 (3.78)	73.8 (2.91)	18.8 (0.74)	18.5 (0.73)	12.3 (0.48)	10.4 (0.41)	5.1 (0.20)	3.2 (0.13)	3.4 (0.13)	15.2 (0.60)	48.7 (1.92)	369 (14.54)
Average rainy days (≥ 0.2 mm)	8.1	8.1	5.9	2.6	2.6	2.7	1.4	1.0	0.8	1.3	2.4	5.4	42.3
