= Jean-Paul Turcaud =

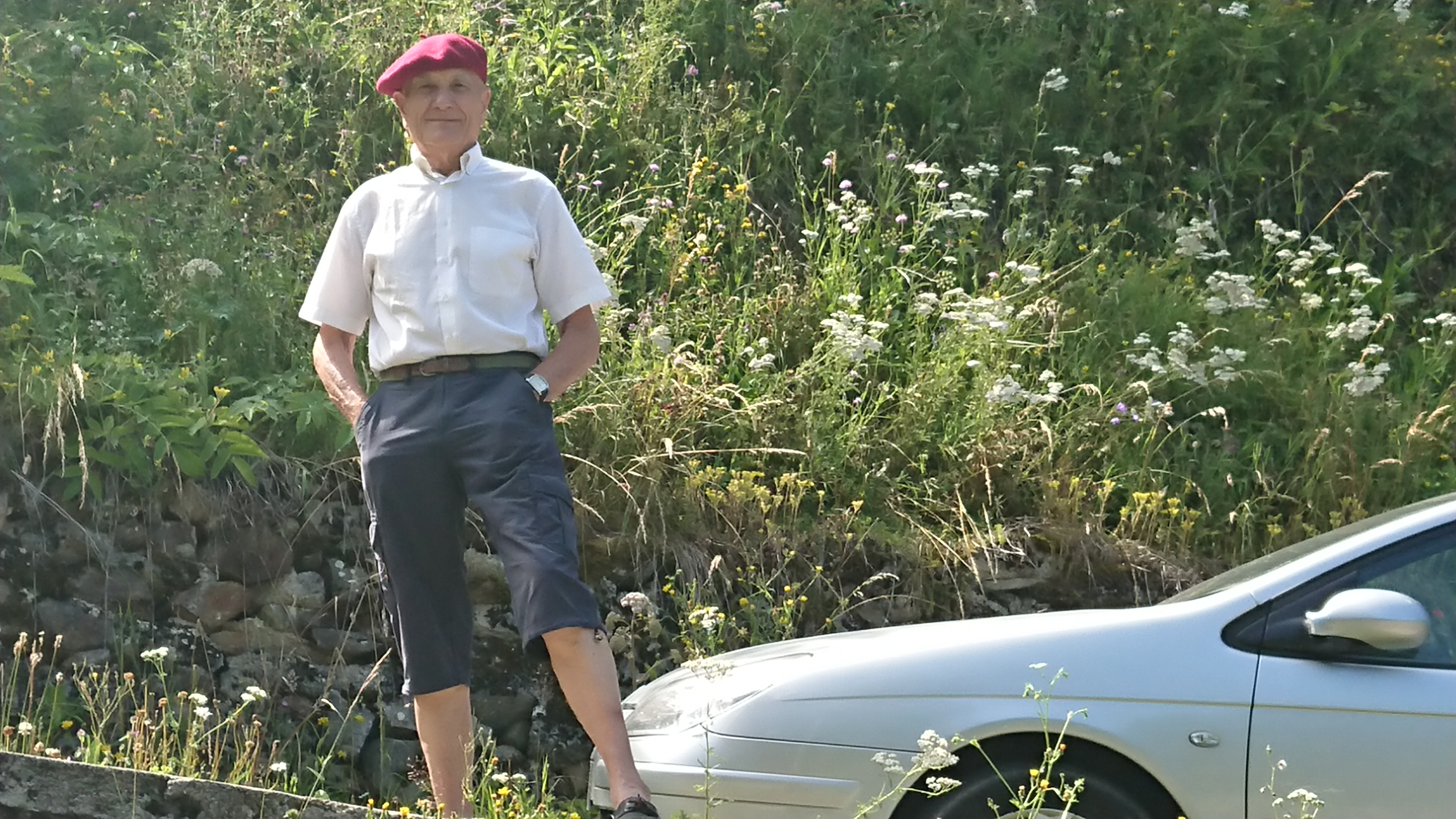
- Born: c. 1940; France
- Died: August 20, 2020; La Rochelle, France
- Occupation: Mining pioneer
- Years active: 1960s–1980s
- Known for: Claiming the discovery of the Telfer Mine

Jean-Paul Turcaud (c. 1940–2020) was a French mining pioneer, and one of many claimants to the discovery of the Telfer Mine in Western Australia, for a time Australia's largest gold mine. The discovery of this prospect was attributed by Newmont Mining to David Tyrwhitt in 1972.

== Early life ==
Jean-Paul Turcaud arrived in Australia as a young immigrant from France in the late 1960s. He had served in the French Army as a Second Lieutenant in Algeria.

== Turcaud's claim ==
There are many prospectors who claim to have discovered the mine. However, in this case, the officially recognised claimants do not deny that Jean-Paul Turcaud, after having spent a considerable amount of time searching Australia's Great Sandy Desert, was the first prospector to find the mineral deposit that eventually became the Telfer Mine. Turcaud claims he found the Telfer deposit two years before Newmont did and fought Newmont in legal battles throughout the 1970s without an outcome. Eventually, Turcaud left Australia, exhausted from the emotional and financial strain, while the Telfer Mine was opened by Newmont in 1977. In the early 1980s, Turcaud reached a settlement, accepting $25,000 from Newmont's head office in New York City but continued his claim, demanding a Royal Commission into the matter.

== Counter claim ==
The counter claim by Newmont Mining, the project was later spun off into Newcrest Mining, was that discovery of a mineral deposit does not, in and of itself, constitute recognition of that discovery. They argue that discovery of a prospect usually goes to those who physically peg the area and correctly identify the mineable minerals in the deposit.

Jean-Paul Turcaud, for various reasons and in contradiction to the Mining Act, failed to do either of these. Whilst there is little argument that Turcaud was prospecting in the area and that he did find and identify mineralised gossans, he failed to identify the project as being prospective for gold. On several occasions he attempted to interest local mining companies, like WMC Resources and Anglo American, in the tenements based on its base metal (primarily copper) potential.

David Tyrwhitt, the recognised discoverer of Telfer, stated in an interview that while he did not think Turcaud deserved any credit for his claimed discovery, he did admire the man's pioneering spirit, going out into the desert alone. Tyrwhitt eventually rose to the position of a director of Newmont.

== Later life ==
Turcaud continued to sign posts to newspapers in regards to Global warming as the Discoverer of the Telfer and Nifty Mine.

Turcaud operated an Internet website called, in reference to Telfer, The Greatest Australian Mining Covered up Swindle of the 20th Century. He died at home at La Rochelle in south-western France on 20 August 2020.
