= Evil Angels (film) =

1988 film by Fred Schepisi

- Theatrical release poster
- Directed by: Fred Schepisi
- Screenplay by: Robert Caswell; Fred Schepisi
- Based on: Evil Angels by John Bryson
- Produced by: Verity Lambert
- Starring: Meryl Streep; Sam Neill
- Cinematography: Ian Baker
- Edited by: Jill Bilcock
- Music by: Bruce Smeaton
- Distributed by: Warner Bros. (through Roadshow Distributors; Australia); Cannon Films (International)
- Release dates: 3 November 1988 (Australia); 11 November 1988 (United States)
- Running time: 121 minutes
- Countries: Australia; United States; United Kingdom
- Language: English
- Budget: $15 million
- Box office: $6.9 million (United States)

Evil Angels (released as A Cry in the Dark outside Australia and New Zealand) is a 1988 drama film directed by Fred Schepisi. The screenplay by Schepisi and Robert Caswell is based on John Bryson's 1985 book of the same name. It chronicles the case of Azaria Chamberlain, a nine-week-old baby girl who disappeared from a campground near Uluru in August 1980, and the struggle of her parents, Michael Chamberlain and Lindy Chamberlain, to prove their innocence to a public convinced that they were complicit in her death. Meryl Streep and Sam Neill star as the Chamberlains.

The film was released less than two months after the Chamberlains were exonerated by the Northern Territory Court of Appeals of all charges filed against them. The film received generally favourable reviews, with Streep's performance receiving high praise and a nomination for the Academy Award for Best Actress, but was a box office disappointment, grossing only $6.9 million against its $15 million budget.

== Plot ==
This is a true story. It began in August 1980 at Mt Isa in the Australian state of Queensland.

— Opening caption

Seventh-day Adventist Church pastor Michael Chamberlain, his wife Lindy Chamberlain, their two sons, and their nine-week-old daughter Azaria are on a camping holiday in the Australian Outback. After visiting Ayers Rock, with baby Azaria now asleep in their tent, the family enjoys a barbecue with their fellow campers when a cry is heard. Lindy returns to the tent to check and is certain she sees a dingo with something in its mouth running off as she approaches. When she discovers the infant missing, everyone joins forces to search for her, without success. It is assumed what Lindy saw was the animal carrying Azaria, and a subsequent inquest rules her account of events as true.

However, the tide of public opinion soon turns against the Chamberlains. For many, Lindy seems too stoic, cold-hearted, and accepting of the disaster that has befallen the family. Gossip about her begins to swell and soon is accepted as statements of fact. The couple's religious beliefs are not widely practiced in the country, and when the media report a rumour that the name Azaria means "sacrifice in the wilderness", the public is quick to believe they decapitated their baby with a pair of scissors as part of a bizarre religious rite.

Law-enforcement officials find new witnesses, forensics experts, and circumstantial evidence and reopen the investigation, eventually charging Lindy with murder. Seven months pregnant, she ignores her attorneys' advice to play to the jury's sympathy and appears stoic on the stand, convincing some onlookers of her guilt. As the trial progresses, Michael's faith in his religion and his belief in his wife falter, and he stumbles through his testimony, suggesting he is concealing the truth. In October 1982, Lindy is found guilty and immediately sentenced to life imprisonment with hard labour, while Michael is found guilty as an accessory and given an 18-month suspended sentence.

More than three years later, while searching for the body of an English tourist who fell from Uluru, police discover a dingo lair with clothing that is identified as the jacket Lindy had insisted Azaria was wearing over her jumpsuit, which had been recovered early in the investigation. Lindy is immediately released from prison, the case is reopened and all convictions against the Chamberlains are overturned.

September 15, 1988. Eight years after the disappearance of their baby Azaria, Lindy and Michael Chamberlain finally won the fight to prove their innocence. All three judges of the Northern Territory Court of Appeals exonerated the Chamberlains of all charges. The fight to restore their lives continues.

— Closing captions

== Cast ==
- Meryl Streep as Lindy Chamberlain
- Sam Neill as Michael Chamberlain
- Bruce Myles as Ian Barker, Q.C.
- Neil Fitzpatrick as John Phillips, Q.C.
- Charles Tingwell as Justice James Muirhead
- Maurie Fields as Justice Denis Barritt
- Nick Tate as Det. Graeme Charlwood
- Lewis Fitz-Gerald as Stuart Tipple
- Dorothy Alison as Avis Murchison, Lindy's mother
- Peter Hosking as Macknay
- Dennis Miller as Sturgess
- Sandy Gore as Joy Kuhl
- Kevin Miles as Professor Cameron
- Jon Finlayson as Professor Boettcher
- Ian Gilmour as John Buckland
- Chuck Faulkner as Conrad Grey
- Maureen Edwards as Kate Woodman
- Justin Gaffney as Colin McRae
- Vincent Gil as Roff
- Trevor Kent as Bomb Scare Policeman
- Debra Lawrance as Sally Lowe
- Reg Gorman as Mr Whittaker
- Alan Hopgood as President Cox
- Bob Baines as Chief Minister
- Ian McFadyen as Attorney General
- Ruby Hunter as Judy Roberts
- Mark Mitchell as School Teacher
- Marty Fields as Commuter
- Louise Siversen as Jenny Miller (uncredited)

== Production ==
John Bryson's book Evil Angels was published in 1985 and film rights were bought by Verity Lambert, for Thorn EMI who had planned to co-produce it with Thorn EMI's Australian distribution partner Greater Union, who got the interest of Meryl Streep. Robert Caswell wrote a script and Fred Schepisi agreed to direct. The movie was one of the most expensive and elaborate ever shot in Australia, with 350 speaking cast and 4,000 extras.

== Release ==
=== Box office ===
Evil Angels grossed A$3,006,964 at the box office in Australia. This was considered a disappointment considering the publicity and subject matter.

=== Critical reception ===
In his review in The New York Times, Vincent Canby said the film "has much of the manner of a television docudrama, ultimately being a rather comforting celebration of personal triumph over travails so dread and so particular that they have no truly disturbing, larger application. Yet A Cry in the Dark is better than that, mostly because of another stunning performance by Meryl Streep, who plays Lindy Chamberlain with the kind of virtuosity that seems to redefine the possibilities of screen acting ... Though Sam Neill is very good as Lindy Chamberlain's tormented husband, Miss Streep supplies the guts of the melodrama that are missing from the screenplay."

"Mr. Schepisi has chosen to present the terrible events in the outback in such a way that there's never any doubt in the audience's mind about what happened. The audience doesn't worry about the fate of the Chamberlains as much as it worries about the unconvincing ease with which justice is miscarried. Mr. Schepisi may have followed the facts of the case, but he has not made them comprehensible in terms of the film. The manner by which justice miscarries is the real subject of the movie. In this screenplay, however, it serves only as a pretext for a personal drama that remains chilly and distant ... As a result, the courtroom confrontations are so weakened that A Cry in the Dark becomes virtually a one-character movie. It's Mr. Schepisi's great good fortune that that one character is portrayed by the incomparable Meryl Streep."

Roger Ebert of the Chicago Sun-Times observed, "Schepisi is successful in indicting the court of public opinion, and his methodical (but absorbing) examination of the evidence helps us understand the state's circumstantial case. In the lead role, Streep is given a thankless assignment: to show us a woman who deliberately refused to allow insights into herself. She succeeds, and so, of course, there are times when we feel frustrated because we do not know what Lindy is thinking or feeling. We begin to dislike the character, and then we know how the Australian public felt. Streep's performance is risky and masterful."

In The Washington Post, Rita Kempley said, "Streep – yes, with another perfect accent – brings her customary skillfulness to the part. It's not a showy performance, but the heroine's internal struggle seems to come from the actress' pores. Neill, who costarred with Streep in Plenty, is quite good as a humble, bewildered sort who finally breaks under cross-examination." Variety made note of the "intimate, incredible detail in the classy, disturbing drama."

On Rotten Tomatoes, the film holds a rating of 94% from 34 reviews.

=== Accolades ===
| Award | Category | Subject | Result |
|---|---|---|---|
| AACTA Awards (1989 AFI Awards) | Best Film | Verity Lambert | Won |
| AACTA Awards (1989 AFI Awards) | Best Direction | Fred Schepisi | Won |
| AACTA Awards (1989 AFI Awards) | Best Adapted Screenplay | Fred Schepisi & Robert Caswell | Won |
| AACTA Awards (1989 AFI Awards) | Best Actor | Sam Neill | Won |
| AACTA Awards (1989 AFI Awards) | Best Actress | Meryl Streep | Won |
| AACTA Awards (1989 AFI Awards) | Best Editing | Jill Bilcock | Nominated |
| AACTA Awards (1989 AFI Awards) | Best Original Music Score | Bruce Smeaton | Nominated |
| AACTA Awards (1989 AFI Awards) | Best Sound | Craig Carter, Peter Fenton, Martin Oswin & Terry Rodman | Nominated |
| Academy Award | Best Actress | Meryl Streep | Nominated |
| Cannes Film Festival | Palme d'Or | Fred Schepisi | Nominated |
| Cannes Film Festival | Best Actress | Meryl Streep | Won |
| Chicago Film Critics Association Award | Best Actress | Meryl Streep | Nominated |
| Golden Globe Awards | Best Motion Picture – Drama | A Cry in the Dark | Nominated |
| Golden Globe Awards | Best Director | Fred Schepisi | Nominated |
| Golden Globe Awards | Best Screenplay | Fred Schepisi & Robert Caswell | Nominated |
| Golden Globe Awards | Best Actress in a Motion Picture – Drama | Meryl Streep | Nominated |
| Motion Picture Sound Editors | Golden Reel Award for Best Sound Editing - Sound Effects | Tim Chau | Nominated |
| New York Film Critics Circle Award | Best Actress | Meryl Streep | Won |
| Political Film Society Award | Exposé | A Cry in the Dark | Won |
| Sant Jordi Awards | Best Foreign Actress | Meryl Streep | Nominated |

== In popular culture ==
Lindy Chamberlain's cry, "the dingo's got my baby," often incorrectly quoted as "a dingo ate my baby", became part of pop culture after the release of the movie, appearing on such shows as Seinfeld, The Simpsons, Frasier, Supernatural, Buffy the Vampire Slayer, and Baby Daddy, as well as Tropic Thunder and The Rugrats Movie.

In June 2008, the AFI revealed its "Ten Top Ten"—the best ten films in ten "classic" American film genres—after polling over 1,500 people from the creative community. Evil Angels was acknowledged as ninth best in the courtroom drama genre.

== See also ==
- Cinema of Australia
- Trial movies
