= Death of Azaria Chamberlain =

1980 killing in Australia

- Azaria and her mother, Lindy
- Date: 17 August 1980
- Location: Uluru, Australia
- Outcome: Legally dead, 12 June 2012
- Suspects: Lindy (accused of murder); Michael (accessory)
- Convictions: Lindy: life imprisonment; Michael: 18-month suspended sentence; (both overturned on appeal)

Azaria Chantel Loren Chamberlain (11 June 1980 in Mount Isa – 17 August 1980 in Uluru / Ayers Rock) was a nine-week-old Australian infant who was killed by a dingo on the night of 17 August 1980 during a family camping trip to Uluru (Ayers Rock) in the Northern Territory. Her body was never found and it is believed that it cannot be recovered. Her parents, Lindy and Michael Chamberlain, reported that she had been taken from their tent by a dingo. However, Lindy was tried for murder and spent more than three years in prison, and Michael received a suspended sentence. Lindy was released only after Azaria's jacket was found near a dingo's den and new inquests were opened. In 2012, 32 years after Azaria's death, the Chamberlains' version of events was supported by a coroner.

An initial inquest held in Alice Springs in the Supreme Court supported the parents' claim and was highly critical of the police investigation. The findings were broadcast live on television, a first in Australia. After a further investigation and a second inquest held in Darwin, Lindy was tried for murder, convicted on 29 October 1982 and sentenced to life imprisonment. Azaria's father, Michael, was convicted as an accessory after the fact (i.e. aiding the principal after the crime has been committed, but playing no role in the crime itself) and given a suspended sentence. The media focus for the trial was unusually intense and aroused accusations of sensationalism, while the trial itself was criticised for being unprofessional and biased. The Chamberlains made several unsuccessful appeals, including the final High Court appeal.

After all legal options had been exhausted, the chance discovery in 1986 of Azaria's jacket in an area with numerous dingo lairs led to Lindy's release from prison. On 15 September 1988, the Northern Territory Court of Criminal Appeals unanimously overturned all convictions against Lindy and Michael. A third inquest was conducted in 1995, which resulted in an "open" finding. At a fourth inquest held on 12 June 2012, Coroner Elizabeth Morris delivered her findings that Azaria Chamberlain had been taken and killed by a dingo. After being released, Lindy was paid $1.3 million for false imprisonment and an amended death certificate was issued.

Numerous books have been written about the case, and there exist several pop culture references notably using some form of the phrase "a dingo ate my baby" or "a dingo took my baby". The story has been made into a television movie, a feature film, Evil Angels, a television miniseries, a theatrical production, a concept album by the Australian band the Paradise Motel, and an opera, Lindy, by Moya Henderson.

== Coroner's inquests ==
The initial coronial inquest into the disappearance was opened in Alice Springs on 15 December 1980 before magistrate Denis Barritt. On 20 February 1981, in the first live telecast of Australian court proceedings, Barritt ruled that the likely cause was a dingo attack. In addition to this finding, Barritt also concluded that, subsequent to the attack, "the body of Azaria was taken from the possession of the dingo, and disposed of by an unknown method, by a person or persons, name unknown".

The Northern Territory Police and prosecutors were dissatisfied with this finding. Investigations continued, leading to a second inquest in Darwin in September 1981. Based on ultraviolet photographs of Azaria's jumpsuit, James Cameron of the London Hospital Medical College alleged that "there was an incised wound around the neck of the jumpsuit—in other words, a cut throat" and that there was an imprint of the hand of a small adult on the jumpsuit, visible in the photographs. Their Yellow Holden Torana was also seized in Queensland and flown by military aircraft to Alice Springs. Following this and other findings, the Chamberlains were charged with Azaria's murder. In 1995, a third inquest was conducted which failed to determine a cause of death, resulting in an "open" finding.

== Case against Lindy Chamberlain ==
The Crown alleged that Lindy Chamberlain had cut Azaria's throat in the front seat of the family car, hiding the baby's body in a large camera case. She then, according to the proposed reconstruction of the crime, rejoined the group of campers around a campfire and fed one of her sons a can of baked beans, before going to the tent and raising the cry that a dingo had taken the baby. It was alleged that at a later time, while other people from the campsite were searching, she disposed of the body.

The key evidence supporting this allegation was the jumpsuit, discovered about a week after the baby's disappearance about 4 km (2.5 miles) from the tent, bloodstained about the neck, as well as a highly contentious forensic report claiming to have found evidence of foetal haemoglobin in stains on the front seat of the Chamberlains' 1977 Holden Torana hatchback. Foetal haemoglobin is present in infants six months and younger; Azaria was nine-and-a-half weeks old at the time of her disappearance.

Lindy Chamberlain was questioned about the garments that Azaria was wearing. She claimed that Azaria was wearing a matinee jacket over the jumpsuit, but the jacket was not present when the garments were found. She was questioned about the fact that Azaria's singlet, which was inside the jumpsuit, was inside out. She insisted that she never put a singlet on her babies inside out and that she was most particular about this. The statement conflicted with the state of the garments when they were collected as evidence. The garments had been arranged by the investigating officer for a photograph.

In her defence, eyewitness evidence was presented of dingoes having been seen in the area on the evening of 17 August 1980. All witnesses claimed to believe the Chamberlains' story. One witness, a nurse, also reported having heard a baby's cry after the time when the prosecution alleged Azaria had been murdered. Evidence was also presented that adult blood also passed the test used for foetal haemoglobin, and that other organic compounds can produce similar results on that particular test, including mucus from the nose and chocolate milkshakes, both of which had been present in the vehicle where Azaria was allegedly murdered.

Engineer Les Harris, who had conducted dingo research for over a decade, said that, contrary to Cameron's findings, a dingo's carnassial teeth can shear through material as tough as motor vehicle seat belts. He also cited an example of a captive female dingo removing a bundle of meat from its wrapping paper and leaving the paper intact.

The defence's case was rejected by the jury. Lindy Chamberlain was convicted of murder on 29 October 1982 and sentenced to life imprisonment. Michael Chamberlain was found guilty as an accessory after the fact and was given an 18-month suspended sentence.

=== Appeals ===
An unsuccessful appeal was made to the Federal Court in April 1983. Subsequently, the High Court of Australia was asked to quash the convictions on the ground that the verdicts were unsafe and unsatisfactory. However, in February 1984 the court refused the appeal by majority (3–2).

== Release and acquittal ==
1986 ABC news report of Lindy Chamberlain's release.

The final resolution of the case was triggered by a chance discovery. In early 1986, British tourist David Brett fell to his death from Uluru during an evening climb. Because of the vast size of the rock and the scrubby nature of the surrounding terrain, it was eight days before Brett's remains were discovered, lying below the bluff where he had lost his footing and in an area full of dingo lairs. As police searched the area, looking for missing bones that might have been carried off by dingoes, they discovered Azaria's missing matinee jacket.

The Chief Minister of the Northern Territory ordered Lindy Chamberlain's immediate release and the case was reopened. On 15 September 1988, the Northern Territory Court of Criminal Appeals unanimously overturned all convictions against Lindy and Michael Chamberlain.

The questionable nature of the forensic evidence in the Chamberlain trial, and the weight given to it, raised concerns about such procedures and about expert testimony in criminal cases. The prosecution had successfully argued that the pivotal haemoglobin tests indicated the presence of foetal haemoglobin in the Chamberlains' car and it was a significant factor in the original conviction. But it was later shown that these tests were highly unreliable and that similar tests, conducted on a "sound deadener" sprayed on during the manufacture of the car, had yielded virtually identical results.

Two years after they were exonerated, the Chamberlains were awarded $1.3 million in compensation for wrongful imprisonment, a sum that covered less than one third of their legal expenses.

The findings of the third coroner's inquest were released on 13 December 1995; the coroner found "the cause and manner of death as unknown."

In December 2011, Elizabeth Morris, then one of the Northern Territory coroners, announced that a fourth inquest would be held in February 2012, which was to be done "largely in relation to information provided by [the Chamberlains'] counsel about dingo attacks since the death of Azaria" as part of a campaign by the Chamberlains for a new inquest to establish that Azaria had been taken by a dingo. On 12 June 2012, at a fourth coronial inquest into the disappearance of Azaria Chamberlain, Morris ruled that a dingo was responsible for her death in 1980. Morris made the finding in the light of subsequent reports of dingo attacks on humans causing injury and even death. She stated, "Azaria Chamberlain died at Ayers Rock on 17 August 1980. The cause of her death was as a result of being attacked and taken by a dingo." She subsequently offered her condolences to the parents and siblings of Azaria Chamberlain "on the death of [their] special and dearly loved daughter and sister", and stated that a new death certificate with the cause of death had been registered.

== Media involvement and bias ==
The Chamberlain trial was highly publicised. Given that most of the evidence presented in the case against Lindy Chamberlain was later rejected, the case is now used as an example of trial by media, wherein media coverage and bias can adversely affect a trial.

Public and media opinion during the trial was polarised, with "fanciful rumours and sickening jokes" and many cartoons. In particular, antagonism was directed towards Lindy Chamberlain for reportedly not behaving like a stereotype of what would be expected from a grieving mother. Much was made of the Chamberlains' Seventh-day Adventist religion, including allegations that the church was actually a cult that killed infants as part of bizarre religious ceremonies.

One anonymous tip was received from a man, claiming to be Azaria's doctor in Mount Isa, that the name "Azaria" meant "sacrifice in the wilderness" (it actually means "Helped by God"). In addition to being subject of a figurative witch-hunt, some claimed she was literally a witch. It was reported that Lindy Chamberlain dressed her baby in a black dress. This provoked negative opinion.

== Subsequent events ==
Since the Chamberlain case, proven cases of attacks on humans by dingoes have been discussed in the public domain, in particular dingo attacks on K'gari (off the Queensland coast), the last refuge in Australia for isolated pure-bred wild dingoes. In the wake of these attacks, it emerged that there had been at least 400 documented dingo attacks on K'gari. Most were against children, but at least two were on adults. For example, in April 1998, a 13-month-old girl was attacked by a dingo and dragged for about one metre (3 ft) from a picnic blanket at the Waddy Point camping area. The child was dropped when her father intervened.

In July 2004, Frank Cole, a Melbourne pensioner, claimed that he had shot a dingo in 1980 and found a baby in its mouth. After interviewing Cole on the matter, police decided not to reopen the case. He claimed to have the ribbons from the jacket which Azaria had been wearing when she disappeared as proof of his involvement. However, Lindy Chamberlain claimed that the jacket had no ribbons on it. Cole's credibility was further damaged when it was revealed he had made unsubstantiated claims about another case.

In August 2005, a 25-year-old woman named Erin Horsburgh claimed that she was Azaria Chamberlain, but her claims were rejected by the authorities and the Australian Broadcasting Corporation's Media Watch program, which stated that none of the reports linking Horsburgh to the Chamberlain case had any substance.

== Later events ==
Michael Chamberlain died of leukemia on 9 January 2017, aged 72. The National Museum of Australia has in its collection more than 250 items related to the disappearance of Azaria Chamberlain, which Lindy Chamberlain has helped document. Items include courtroom sketches by artists Jo Darbyshire and Veronica O'Leary, camping equipment, the Chamberlain family's car, outfits worn by Lindy Chamberlain, the number from her prison door, and the black dress worn by Azaria. The National Library of Australia has a small collection of items relating to Azaria, such as her birth records, as well as a manuscript collection which includes around 20,000 documents including some of the Chamberlain family's correspondence and a large number of letters from the general public. Later the actual car itself was sold to the museum by Michael Chamberlain.

== Media and cultural impact ==
=== Films and television ===
The death of Azaria Chamberlain has been the subject of several books, films and television shows, and other publications and accounts. The John Bryson book Evil Angels was published in 1985, and subsequently adapted by Australian film director Fred Schepisi into a 1988 feature film of the same name (released as A Cry in the Dark outside of Australia and New Zealand), starring Meryl Streep as Lindy Chamberlain and Sam Neill as Michael. The film gave Streep her eighth Academy Award nomination and her first AFI Award.

In 2002, Lindy, an opera by Moya Henderson, was produced by Opera Australia at the Sydney Opera House.

The story was dramatised as a television miniseries, Through My Eyes (2004), with Miranda Otto and Craig McLachlan as the Chamberlains. This miniseries was based on Lindy's book of the same name.

=== Podcast ===
The death of Azaria and the story of the search, inquests, trial and eventual exoneration of the Chamberlains was documented in a commercial podcast, A Perfect Storm: The True Story of the Chamberlains. The case was also covered by the Casefile podcast, episode 136, the debunking podcast You're Wrong About, the Killer Queens podcast, episode 180, and the crime podcast International Infamy with Ashley Flowers. Tooth and Claw, an animal attack podcast, covered the story in 2022 over two episodes.

This case was also covered in a 2024 episode of "The Red Thread".

Fin vs. History, a satirical history podcast starring British comedians Fin Taylor and Horatio Gould, covered the case over a two-episode series called "A Dingo Ate My Baby." Part two of the series also featured Australian comedian Damien Power.

=== Popular culture references ===
"A dingo ate my baby!" is a cry popularly attributed to Lindy Chamberlain. The phrase was popularised via the case, but Chamberlain is reported to have called out to her husband either "the dingo's got my baby," "a dingo took my baby!", "that dog's got my baby!" or "my God, my God, a dingo has got my baby!"

The event was satirised for US television series such as Seinfeld, Buffy the Vampire Slayer and The Simpsons, and became common in American pop culture with phrases such as "a dingo's got my baby!" and "a dingo ate my baby!".

=== Theatrical production ===
Playwright Alana Valentine conceived a production in 2013, featuring criticism and outrage towards Lindy Chamberlain surrounding the events and aftermath of the death of Azaria. The production continues a decade later: in 2023 amateur theatre company Milton Follies starred Ashley Howes as Lindy.

== See also ==
- Kelly Keen coyote attack
- List of miscarriage of justice cases
- List of solved missing person cases: 1950–1999
