= Michael Chamberlain =

Australian teacher and pastor (1944–2017)

- Born: Michael Leigh Chamberlain; 27 February 1944; Christchurch, New Zealand
- Died: 9 January 2017 (aged 72); Gosford, New South Wales, Australia
- Education: PhD University of Newcastle; BTeach Avondale College; MA Andrews University; BA Avondale College
- Occupations: Pastor; teacher; writer
- Spouses: Lindy Murchison (m. 1968; div. 1991) Ingrid Bergner (m. 1994)
- Children: Aidan (born 1973); Reagan (born 1976); Azaria (June–August 1980); Kahlia (born 1982); Zahra (born 1996)
- Writing career
- Notable works: Beyond Azaria / Michael Chamberlain, Lowell Tarling (1999, ISBN 1-86350-277-7)

Michael Leigh Chamberlain (27 February 1944 – 9 January 2017) was a New Zealand-Australian writer, teacher and pastor falsely implicated in the August 1980 death of his missing daughter Azaria, which was later demonstrated to be the result of a dingo attack while the family was camping near Uluru (then usually called Ayers Rock) in the Northern Territory, Australia. Chamberlain's then-wife Lindy was falsely convicted of the baby's murder in 1982 and he was convicted of being an accessory after the fact. The findings of a 1987 royal commission ultimately exonerated the couple, but not before they were subjected to sensationalist reporting and intense public scrutiny.

== Early life and pastoral career ==
Chamberlain was born in Christchurch, New Zealand, the eldest son of Ivan and Greta Chamberlain. His father served as a warrant officer in the Royal New Zealand Air Force during World War II, while his mother was involved with the administration of the Seventh-day Adventist Church in southern New Zealand.

Educated at Lincoln High School and Christchurch Boys' High School, Chamberlain commenced studies at the University of Canterbury but after converting to the Seventh-day Adventist Church in 1965, he left and migrated to Australia. He subsequently studied at Avondale College in Cooranbong and graduated with a Bachelor of Arts (Theology) degree in 1969. He married Lindy Murchison the same year, after meeting her in 1968.

After graduating, Chamberlain worked as a Seventh-day Adventist minister in Tasmania, where Lindy Chamberlain gave birth to two children — Aidan (born 1973) and Reagan (born 1976). In 1977 the family moved to Queensland, where Chamberlain produced and presented a radio program called The Good Life, a commentary on lifestyle and culture throughout the northern parts of the state. The Chamberlains' third child, daughter Azaria, was born in Mount Isa on 11 June 1980.

== Death of Azaria ==
In August 1980, the Chamberlain family holidayed in Darwin, Northern Territory, where Michael intended to fish for barramundi. Lindy Chamberlain, however, had visited Uluru/Ayers Rock when she was 16 and wished to visit again, so the family travelled there with the intention of camping three days before continuing on to Darwin. The family had several encounters with dingoes after making camp at Uluru, including on the night of 17 August when Chamberlain fed one a piece of crust. Shortly before 8:00 pm, Lindy Chamberlain put Azaria to bed in their tent and returned to the campfire. After crying out at about 8:00 pm, Azaria disappeared from their tent, never to be seen again.

Investigators observed prints on the floor of the tent and bloodstained clothing belonging to the child was later discovered amongst rocks near the base of Uluru. The coronial inquest in Alice Springs, Northern Territory, in 1981 concluded that the baby had been taken by a dingo; however, this finding was overturned by another inquest in Darwin in 1982. Lindy Chamberlain was subsequently tried for murder and given a life sentence, while Michael was convicted of being an accessory after the fact and given an eighteen-month suspended sentence.

During her imprisonment in Darwin, Lindy Chamberlain gave birth to the couple's fourth child, Kahlia (born 1982). Two weeks later, Chamberlain was awarded a Master of Arts degree through Andrews University. He later attributed his perseverance in studying for the degree during this difficult period as motivated by anger towards the Northern Territory government.

The final resolution of the case was triggered by a chance discovery. In early 1986, English tourist David Brett fell to his death from Uluru during an evening climb. Because of the vast size of the rock and the scrubby nature of the surrounding terrain, it was eight days before Brett's remains were discovered, lying below the bluff where he had lost his footing and in an area full of dingo lairs. As police searched the area, looking for missing bones that might have been carried off by dingoes, they discovered a small item of clothing. It was quickly identified as the crucial missing piece of evidence from the Chamberlain case—Azaria's missing matinee jacket.

The Chief Minister of the Northern Territory ordered Lindy Chamberlain's immediate release and the case was reopened. A 1987 Royal Commission examined the case against the Chamberlains and the science behind key forensic evidence was challenged. On 15 September 1988, the Northern Territory Court of Criminal Appeals unanimously overturned all convictions against Lindy and Michael Chamberlain. The exoneration was based on a rejection of the two key points of the prosecution's case—particularly the alleged fetal haemoglobin evidence—and of bias and invalid assumptions made during the initial trial.

They spelled out that what they meant by quashing the guilty verdicts was not just that we were not guilty, but that we were innocent.

— Michael Chamberlain

Following their exoneration, the Chamberlains' relationship deteriorated and they divorced in 1991. Three years later, Chamberlain married Ingrid Bergner and in 1996 they had a daughter named Zahra.

== Later life ==
In 2002, Chamberlain attained a Doctor of Philosophy (education) degree from the University of Newcastle for his thesis entitled "The changing role of Ellen White in Seventh-day Adventism with reference to sociocultural standards at Avondale College". That same year he graduated from Avondale College with a Bachelor of Teaching degree, qualifying him to teach high school English and history.

=== State election ===
Chamberlain stood as a Liberal candidate for the seat of Lake Macquarie in the 2003 New South Wales parliamentary election, achieving a 5.2% swing against sitting member Jeff Hunter. However, the swing was not enough to claim the seat and Chamberlain went on to accept a three-year teaching post at an Aboriginal high school in Brewarrina, New South Wales. While living there, Chamberlain was twice assaulted by a man accusing him of murdering Azaria; the man was convicted of assault and jailed.

=== Teaching career and publishing ===
Chamberlain returned to Cooranbong in 2006 and taught at Gosford High School until 2008, when he retired. In the same year he had published the book Beyond Ellen White: Seventh-day Adventism in Transition, a fully documented book based on his doctoral thesis at the University of Newcastle. In 2012, New Holland Publishers published his fourth book, Heart of Stone, on the eve of the fourth and final inquest into the disappearance of his daughter at Uluru. The coroner declared that a dingo had indeed killed Azaria and apologised to the family for the tragedy and for it taking 32 years to get to the truth. In 2014 the National Museum of Australia acquired Chamberlain's V8 Hatchback Holden Torana. In 2016, Chamberlain was appointed a conjoint professor at the University of Newcastle. He was a conjoint research fellow in the School of Education, Faculty of Humanities, and Social Sciences.

== Death ==
Chamberlain died on 9 January 2017, aged 72, at Gosford Hospital on the New South Wales Central Coast due to complications of acute leukaemia, and had a farewell service held at the Avondale College's Seventh-day Adventist Church one week later.

== In popular culture ==
Chamberlain is portrayed by Sam Neill in the 1988 film Evil Angels (released as A Cry in the Dark outside Australia and New Zealand).
