= Number 96 (film) =

Number 96: The Movie
- Directed by: Peter Benardos, Brian Phillis (locations)
- Written by: David Sale; Johnny Whyte
- Based on: Number 96
- Produced by: Bill Harmon
- Starring: (see cast list)
- Cinematography: John McLean
- Music by: "Theme from Number 96: Paper Boy"
- Production company: Cash Harmon Television
- Distributed by: The 0-10 Network
- Release date: 5 May 1974
- Running time: 113 mins
- Country: Australia
- Language: English
- Budget: AUD$100,000 (est.)
- Box office: AUD$2,476,471

Number 96: The Movie is an Australian drama feature film, (Note: Cinema release feature film adaptation, not a TV movie, as sometimes stated) released in 1974 and based on the television soap opera of the same title that was then running on the 0-10 network. The film features nearly all the show's regular cast, and was created by the show's creative team, Cash Harmon Television produced by Bill Harmon with David Hannay with the screenplay by David Sale and Johnny Whyte and directed by Peter Bernardos and Brian Phillis.

The film's drawcard was that the picture was shot in color, whilst at that time the regular serial was still broadcasting in monochrome. The film also has more revealing nudity than was allowed on TV at the time.

== Plot ==
The film starts with Vera Collins those car is broken down on the main road, thinking assistance becomes available when a group of bikers arrive, however she is instead gang raped, this later affects her troubled romance with politician Nick Brent, when it turns out that one of the rapists is revealed to be Nick's son Tony. She starts a new business endeavour with Maggie Cameron and Simon Carr, a character that they had a bitter rivalry over in the regular TV series.

Aldo Godolfus has been fraudulently withholding cash takings from the deli to avoid paying income tax, but loses the money, when his flat catches on fire. He takes a night job at the Connaught Rooms function hall to recoup the losses.

Les Whittaker, unbeknownst to his wife Norma, enlists Herb Evans and Alf Sutcliffe to assist in his new business venture: a sauna in the building's cellar.

Meanwhile, former Number 96 resident Sonia Freeman (Lynn Rainbow filmed all of her scenes in just one day) returns after her release from a mental asylum. Sonia is now remarried to newspaper journalist, Duncan Hunter. Her forgetful episodes and hallucinations become increasingly erratic and deranged. This worries Duncan, Sonia's good friend, Jack Sellars, and his new girlfriend, flight attendant Diana Moore, who has just moved into Flat 6. It is revealed that Diana and Duncan are secretly scheming to drive Sonia insane, in order to gain her late husband, Gordon's inheritance Jack and the police arrive just in time before Diana and Duncan can persuade Sonia to kill herself, by jumping from the balcony.

Vera ends up in bed with Simon, who is unable to perform. It turns out that he is in fact gay and he has an affair with lawyer Don Finlayson.

Many of the residents become embroiled in the major plans for Dorrie and Herb Evans' ruby wedding celebrations. After looking at her marriage certificate, however, Dorrie discovers that the best man, Horace Deerman, signed where the groom should have. Believing this means that she is married actually to Horace, she tracks him down with Herb and Flo Patterson; he is revealed as a derelict alcoholic, who, much to her dismay, takes a fancy to her.

Vera has fallen in love with Nick, but when she meets his son, Tony Brent, she realises that he was the leader of the bikies who had raped her. Tony recognises Vera and tries to run her over at Dorrie and Herb's fancy dress party. He hits Simon instead, and whilst making another run at Vera, his car hits a brick wall and explodes. Simon recovers and Vera goes on to marry Nick, who later becomes Prime Minister.

== Cast ==
The film featured the majority of actors that starred in the regular serial. Actors marked in bold did not appear in the serial and were exclusive to this film.

- Pat McDonald as Dorrie Evans
- Ron Shand as Herb Evans
- Bunney Brooke as Flo Patterson
- Elaine Lee as Vera Collins
- Lynn Rainbow as Sonia Hunter
- Alister Smart as Duncan Hunter
- Tom Oliver as Jack Sellers
- Thelma Scott as Clair Houghton
- Bettina Welch as Maggie Cameron
- Johnny Lockwood as Aldo Godolfus
- Philippa Baker as Roma Godolfus
- Sheila Kennelly as Norma Whittaker
- Chard Hayward as Dudley Butterfield
- Gordon McDougall as Les Whittaker
- Joe Hasham as Don Finlayson
- Elisabeth Kirkby as Lucy Sutcliffe
- James Elliott as Alf Sutcliffe
- Rebecca Gilling as Diana Moore
- Jeff Kevin as Arnold Feather
- James Condon as Nicholas Brent
- John Orcsik as Simon Carr
- Harry Lawrence as Horace Deerman
- Patrick Ward as Tony Brent
- Paul Chubb (uncredited) as the delivery man (delivers the sauna to the Whitakers)(uncredited)
- Phil Avalon, Caz Lederman, Tony Fields and Albie Thoms as bikers (uncredited)

== Production and release ==
The film was shot in December 1973 over 11 days in colour on 16mm film and then blown up to 35mm.

The film was released with a star studded red carpet premiere and brass band in Sydney at the Regent Theatre in May 1974 during the school holidays and ran for around 9–10 weeks, becoming a major box office success. It screened in Melbourne during the August school holidays and was still on the drive-in circuit during January 1975. In Brisbane, Channel 0 telecast the stars' arrival live during that night's regular Friday night episode.

A gay kiss between series regular Don Finlayson (played by Joe Hasham) and Simon Carr (played by John Orcsik) was mysteriously cut from the movie after its Sydney season.

== Reception ==
The film was a hit, grossing AU$2,476,471 at the box office. It became the fifth highest grossing movie of the 1970s behind Mad Max and just ahead of Caddie.

Critics were not kind to the film, but even Mike Harris from The Australian had to admit he had never been in a cinema before where every character's first appearance got a roar of approval from the crowd.
