= Bunney Brooke =

Australian actress (1921–2000)

- Brooke in the TV series Round the Twist as Nell Rickards in episode "The Copy", 1989
- Born: Dorothy Jean Cronin; 9 January 1925; Bendigo, Victoria, Australia
- Died: 2 April 2000 (aged 75); Manly, Sydney, Australia
- Other names: Bunnie Bunny Brooke, Bunnie Brooke, Bunnie Brookes, Bunnie, Bunny Brooke
- Occupations: Television actress; movie actress; theatre actress; casting director; director
- Years active: 1946-1998
- Spouse: Leonard Brooks (1946–1950; divorced)
- Partner: Pat McDonald
- Children: 2
- Awards: Number 96: Silver Logie Award, Penguin Award: Rock Pool, ABC

Bunney Brooke (9 January 1925 – 2 April 2000), born Dorothy Jean Cronin, was an Australian actress, creator, producer, director, designer, playwright, and casting agent, best known as one of the early faces of Australian television and had a career that spanned over 50 years.

Brooke'e early life was unsettled and she appeared in court when she was 18, after she was charged under Australian National Security Regulations rationing laws with being in the false possession of a WWII services ration coupon book, she stated that she received it from a military friend, who had finished with the coupons, she had originally lied to police regarding her identity and age.

At 18, Brooke herself also joined the Australian Army, and then like many performers of the era she travelled to London to start her career. Like her future co-star Ron Shand in Number 96, she had worked as a circus clown, in the years post-WWII, she started her professional career in repertory theatre

She became known for her television, movie, theatre acting and comedy roles in Australia including the children's show The Magic Circle Club and her role in the soap opera and movie release version of Number 96 as Flo Patterson in the 1970s (a role for which she won a Silver Logie Award). Although her role in Number 96 made Brooke a household name in Australia, the program didn't export well, and she failed to gain international prominence.

In Brooke's later career, she appeared in another television soap opera, E Street as Vi Patchett and in the children's television series Round the Twist as lighthouse owner Nell Rickards (1989 and 1992).

== Personal life ==
Brooke was born as Dorothy Jean Cronin on 9 January 1925, in Bendigo, Victoria, to Fred Cronin and Nellie Gorman and had an unhappy and unsettled early life being adopted at an early age and being raised by either an aunt and uncle, and also by foster parents.

As a young adult, she saw marriage as a means of escape, marrying Leonard Norman Brooks in 1946. The union produced two children but ended after four years, with Brooke reporting that they were "wrong for marriage".

Brooke switched to the carefree life of a drifter with little money and few possessions. After becoming disillusioned with this existence, Brooke sought conventional employment working at various jobs ranging from a clown, acting teacher, to train conductor.

Subsequent experiences of a broken marriage, two children and struggles with depression, illness and lack of money which gave her the depth for years later to win the Best Actress Logie for a 1974 episode of Number 96 as Flo Patterson, who was jilted at the altar.

In the early 1950s, Brooke managed the Prompt Corner coffee lounge in Melbourne with her girlfriend. At that time, several city coffee lounges implicitly catered specifically to LGBT patrons at a time when few other commercial venues existed for them. Prompt Corner also held poetry readings and, aside from the gay and lesbian patrons, it attracted the theatrical and bohemian crowd.

Brooke landed the front cover of the edition of 28 April 1975 of Brisbane's TV Week magazine, giving an interview of her "battle to the top" explaining being in a better position in life, career success and being a star in the earlier years of Australian TV. In April 1976, Brooke endured a heart seizure which brought her to the "brink of death", collapsing at her Rozelle home with crushing chest pains before spending 10 days in intensive care of Balmain Hospital, Sydney. It was the fourth time in 5 years suffering a similar seizure. In Brooke's case, the seizure was brought on by a busy change in lifestyle over a period of months, causing extreme tension that affected the heart; doctors warned she must never endure such tension again, and she made sure it did not happen again.

In 1976, Brooke moved into a house in the near-city suburb of Balmain, yet one year later rented the house and moved out due to a terror campaign which bizarrely included threats, anonymous letters, visits from police, ambulancemen and an undertaker. Brooke owned two dogs, as did her neighbour, and both received photostat pamphlets about keeping residence dogs under control, which is believed to have been the first indication of the aforementioned events.

Brooke lived with Pat McDonald, who suggested her for the role of Flo Patterson. They shared a small house at the eastern end of Fox Valley Road in Wahroonga in northern Sydney. Although the true nature of their relationship was never originally detailed, many photos of them on holiday in various overseas locations were featured in magazines. Pat McDonald would later die in 1990 of pancreas cancer.

Brooke endured a nervous breakdown in the mid-1990s.

Bunney Brooke (left) with Number 96 co-star Pat McDonald

== Career ==
=== Earlier career (1946–1970s) ===
Brooke started her early career in repertory theatre and later worked as a typist with Melbourne-based television production company Crawford Productions. The association with Crawford awoke Brooke's creative side, and she became interested in scripts, joining an amateur theatrical group. A year later, she travelled to the UK. Within a week of arriving, she secured work in the repertory theatre as well as radio and television shows.

Her first Magic Circle Club guest appearance, as a Southern belle with two suitors, led to a recurring role as Aunty Vale, an enchantress, in the children's television series. She later became a mime artist while in Europe as studied under Marcel Marceau in Paris. In the late-1940s it is believed one year later Brooke returned to Australia and gained her legal name "Bunney Brooke", which later became her much well known name.

Brooke's acting career continued into the 1970s. She was working as director of the Adelaide Theatre Company when she was asked to audition for a role in Number 96. The producers of the show were having trouble filling the role of Flo Patterson, a friend and comic foil of gossip Dorrie Evans (Pat McDonald), and Brooke fit the part. Initially seen as a frequent visitor to the flat of Dorrie and her husband Herb, the writers soon burnt down Flo's off-screen apartment in a neighbouring suburb and moved Flo permanently into Dorrie and Herb's flat, where she became a key character in many of the serial's comedy stories.

Brooke continued with Number 96 until the series ended in 1977, also appearing in the film adaptation in 1974. After this she remained a frequent face on Australian television, with roles in television programs like the soap operas The Young Doctors and The Restless Years in the late 1970s. Brooke was specially written into the Young Doctors episode as a clown, she so impressed Grundy Organization executive Reg Watson with her knowledge of clownsmanship.

Ten years prior, she wrote a play about a clown in a bid to entice the very young into theatrical appreciation. So successful was the play she did another naming her clown Trumbo and had him looking for his red nose. Finding such enthusiastic responses from audiences in small theater venues around Melbourne, Brooke wrote a third clown play. She also played various roles in films, miniseries, and TV movies. She acted in the feature film Dawn!, about Olympic Swimmer Dawn Fraser, playing the role of Fraser's mother.

=== Later career (1980s–1990s) ===
In the early 1980s, Brooke was living in Melbourne and again working for Crawford Productions, this time as a casting agent. She had acting roles in the Crawford shows Skyways and Carson's Law. In the 1980s, she cast a relatively unknown Kylie Minogue in The Henderson Kids. In November 1980, Brooke won the Penguin Award for Best Single Performance by an Actress.

Brooke was known to a new generation of viewers with an ongoing role in the children's series Round the Twist (1989) as Nell Rickards, and, in 1990, played Auntie Violet "Vi" Patchett in the soap opera E Street. When she left that series in 1991, her character was written out by accepting the marriage proposal of old friend Johnny Little, played by former Number 96 actor Johnny Lockwood in a guest role.

She appeared in the second series of Round the Twist (1992) and guest starred in some of the later episodes of A Country Practice. Brooke, alongside previous co-star Joyce Jacobs from A Country Practice, acted in a short called Heaven on the 4th Floor (1998), credited as "Bunny Brooke". Note that is with the letter "e" missing from the first name as sometimes credited in other various previous works. This was her last known acting credit. She was subsequently diagnosed with cancer. She died in 2000.

She had at least 69 known acting credits to her name in theatre work, spanning four decades ranging from 1956 to 1989.

== Death ==
Brooke, a heavy smoker and drinker, died in a Manly, New South Wales, hospital on 2 April 2000, aged 75, after a two-year battle with bowel and liver cancer.

On 20 January 2009, her 1974 Silver Logie Award, presented to Brooke in 1975 by the Hollywood actor John Wayne, was purchased by an anonymous Queensland bidder in a 24-hour auction on eBay for A$2,225.

=== Tributes ===
Director Charlie Little had Brooke reflect on her life to him not long before she died as her illness worsened. Little recalls, she said "I've done all the things I've wanted to do in my life. I've been a very lucky woman". He also said Brooke was "Quite Chaplin-esque".

Fellow Number 96 cast member Elisabeth Kirkby said: "Brooke's performance was mesmerising. There was no dialogue. It was just the expression on her face. It was almost as [if] it was actually happening".

Elaine Lee, another Number 96 cast-member, said Brooke "was about laughter, laughter, laughter. We used to laugh a lot, she was a very funny lady". Mark Mitchell, comedian and fellow Round The Twist star, said it was "impossible not to learn from Bunney. You could turn to her in a moment of exasperation knowing she would impart something very timely, if humbling".

Frankie J. Holden, another Round The Twist star, said Brooke "Could play with the kids, be a serious actress opposite the adults and that night drink the crew under the table".

Joanna Milosz, also known as Joanna Milosz-Piekarska, Brooke's long-time agent, said: "Nearly everyone in the industry of the older generation knew Brooke, worked with Brooke, was taught by Brooke or directed by Brooke" and "she had an incredible impact on the industry".

== Filmography ==
=== Film ===
Film
Year	Film	Role	Type
1979 (released 1981)	Alison's Birthday	Aunt Jennifer Findlay	Feature film
1979	Dawn!	Mum	Feature film
1998	Heaven On The 4th Floor	(as Bunny Brooke)	Film short

=== Television ===
Television
Year	Title	Role	Type
1956	Lilli Palmer Theatre	2nd Woman (as Bunny Brooke)	TV series UK, 1 episode
1961	Long Distance	unknown role	TV movie
1962	The One Day of the Year	(as Bunny Brooke)	TV movie
1962–1963	Consider Your Verdict	(as Bunny Brooke) / Alice Munro	TV series, 2 episodes
1965	The Magic Circle Club	Aunty Vale (as Bunny Brooke)	TV series
1966	Jimmy	Herself	TV series, 1 episode
1971	Matlock Police	Mrs. Andrews	TV series, 1 episode
1971–1973	Homicide	Mum Enright / Mrs. Hovey / Sandra Martin	TV series, 3 episodes
1971–1973	Division 4	Lorna Matthews / Lily Reid / Elsie Hudson / Kate 'Porky' Robinson / Edna Mitchell / Joan Marriott	TV series, 6 episodes
1973	The Gentlemen of Titipu	Voice	TV movie
1974–1977	Number 96	Flo Patterson	TV series, 247 episodes
1975	The 17th Annual TV Week Logie Awards	Herself (Won Award)	TV special
1975	Pot Of Gold	Herself	TV series
1976	The 1976 Annual TV Week Logie Awards	Herself - Audience member with 'Number 96' cast: Jeff Kevin, Chard Hayward, Wendy Blacklock, Mike Dorsey & Frances Hargreaves	TV Special
1976	Number 96: And They Said It Wouldn't Last	Herself with Pat McDonald & Ron Shand	TV special
1977	Number 96: The Final Night	Herself with Pat McDonald & Ron Shand	TV special
1977	Telethon '77	Guest - Herself	TV special
1977–1978	Kirby's Company	Maisie Peters	TV series, 14 episodes
1978	A Good Thing Going	Stella	TV movie
1978	The Young Doctors	Trixie Rogers	TV series, 2 episodes
1978–1981	Tickled Pink	Auntie / Angela (as Bunny Brooke)	ABC TV series, 3 episodes
1979–1982	Cop Shop	Madge Baxter / Hilda Preston / Binnie	TV series, 6 episodes
1979	Skyways	Aunt Shirley	TV series, 1 Episode
1979; 1979	The Mike Walsh Show	Guest - Herself	TV series, 1 episode
1979	The Rock Pool	(as Bunny Brooke)	ABC TV Movie
1979; 1980	The Mike Walsh Show	Guest - Herself	TV series, 1 episode
1979	Ride on Stranger	Grannie Jones	ABC TV miniseries, 1 Episode
1980	Cornflakes For Tea	Mrs. Lewis	TV movie
1980	Dead Man's Float aka 'Smuggler's Cove'	Parish	TV movie
1980	The 22nd Annual TV Week Logie Awards	Herself (Won Award)	TV special
1980	The Mike Walsh Show	Guest - Herself	TV series, 1 episode
1981	The Restless Years	Amy Blake	TV series
1982	Holiday Island	Tillie Taggart (as Bunnie Brooke)	TV series
1983	Carson's Law	Ma Bonner	TV series, 3 episodes
1984	Boy In The Bush	Gran Ellis	ABC TV Mini-Series, 2 episodes
1984	The Mike Walsh Show	Guest - Herself	TV series, 1 episode
1985, 1993	A Country Practice	Nancy Plummer / Mrs. Plummer / Alice McKenna (as Bunny Brooke)	TV series, 4 episodes
1985	Zoo Family	Madam Rosalita	TV series, 1 episode
1987	Camera Script		episode "Second Star On The Right"
1989–1990	E Street	Vi Patchett	TV series, 125 episodes
1989, 1992	Round The Twist	Nell Rickards	ABC TV series, 26 episodes
1992	Round The Twist	Aunt Tuneless	ABC TV series
1993	A Country Practice	Alice McKenna	TV series, 4 episodes
1996	Good Morning Australia	Herself – Guest	TV series, 1 episode
1996	Midday	Herself – Guest	TV series, 1 episode

== Awards ==
Year	Award	Nominated work	Result
1975	Silver Logie Award	Best Australian Actress – Number 96	Won
1980	Logie Award	Best Lead Actress In A Miniseries/Telemovie – The Rock Pool, ABC	Won
1980	Penguin Award	Best Single Performance by an Actress – The Rock Pool, ABC	Won
