= Josephine Knur =

Australian actress

- Born: c.1955 (aged 70-71); Germany
- Occupation: Actress (former)
- Known for: Number 96 (TV series) as Lorelei Wilkinson

Josephine Knur (c. 1955). is a former Australian actress recognised for her eight-month stint as Lorelei Wilkinson in television soap opera Number 96 in 1974 and The Unisexers

== Career ==
Knur was born in Germany in around 1955, and came to Australia with her family age 5, initially worked for Crawford Productions, as a wardrobe mistress while taking extra and acting jobs guesting in series Ryan and Bellbird, and appearing in TV commercials. She then resigned from the wardrobe department to devote her time to pursuing an acting career full-time, starting with training at the Crawford's acting school.

Knur's attractive appearance led to an offer to appear in a decorative, semi-nude role in sex comedy film Alvin Purple, which Knur rejected as it contained no real acting.

During 1974, Knur had guest roles acting in three episodes of police drama Division 4 each time portraying a different character. In mid 1974 Knur joined the cast of soap opera Number 96 as vivacious dumb-blonde waitress Lorelei Wilkinson, and outfitted in costumes to enhance her physical attractiveness. A comedy character, Lorelei tried to increase her vocabulary by learning a word a day from the dictionary, then incorporating the word into her daily conversation. Knur accepted the requirement to appear nude in Number 96, reasoning the role "gives me a chance to act and be seen acting". Knur was probably best known in the series in the "pantyhose strangler" story-arc in which her character was the first victim of the perpetrator and was killed off in November 1974.

Eleven years later, in 1986, the seriesPrisoner featured another character with the name Lorelei Wilkinson, in this instance played by Paula Duncan.

Following Number 96, Knur was cast in a new soap opera The Unisexers created by the Number 96 producers, Cash Harmon Television. The series debuted 7 February 1975 and Knur played regular character Sally Pickles. The Unisexers proved to be a ratings disaster and taken off air after only three weeks and 15 half-hour episodes.

In 1975 it was reported that Knur and another former Number 96 actor, Pamela Garrick, had made plans to leave Sydney together due to the lack of acting offers, and to work in the Philippines. Knur had no further film or television acting credits after The Unisexers.
