= Cash Harmon Television =

Defunct Australian television production company

Cash-Harmon Television
- Type: Private
- Industry: Film and TV production unit
- Predecessor: Variant of NLT Productions
- Founded: 1970
- Defunct: dissolved 1977
- Headquarters: Crows Nest, New South Wales, Australia
- Key people: Nancy Sales Cash; Directors: Brian Phillis, Peter Bernardos; Screenwriters: David Sale; Johnny Whyte; Ken Shadie; Eleanor Witcombe; Lynn Foster
- Products: Film Wake in Fright; Television, Number 96, The Group
- Owner: Don Cash, Bill Harmon

Cash Harmon Television was an Australian television production company based in the Sydney suburb Crows Nest, New South Wales, operating from the early 1970s until 1980. Their most famous product was evening sex and sin television soap opera Number 96 for the 0-10 Network, which ran from 1972 until 1977. The network had requested a local version in the vein of British series Coronation Street.

== Company history ==
=== NLT Productions ===
Cash Harmon Television was created by two former producers of Sydney-based TV and film production company NLT Productions after its dissolution.

NLT had been founded by talent manager Jack Neary (OAM, OBE) (born as John Edwin Neary; born,19 January 1916-6 April 2000) and entertainer Bobby Limb with financial backing by Les Tinker and produced film Wake in Fright

=== Founders: Don Cash and Bill Harmon ===
The company founders were Englishman Don Cash (1910-1973), and American Bill Harmon (born in 1915 Poughkeepsie, New York-died 1981).

Cash began his career producing stage shows and training films for the Royal Air Force during World War II, and producing such films as The Lavender Hill Mob and Pandora and the Flying Dutchman, before emigrating to the United States and taking up citizenship, whilst working for both the National Broadcasting Corporation (NBC() and American Broadcasting Company.

Harmon had worked producing theatre for Broadway and also television in his native US, before coming to Australia in 1961 producing shows for local entertainers including Limb, Barry Crocker, Dave Allen and Don Lane.

Even though both had much experience in the television industry, they had never worked together, Cash and Harmon had been brought to Australia by NLT.

=== Productions ===
The Cash-Harmon company made situation comedy series The Group in 1971 for the Seven Network. Much of it was written by television writer and author turned future Number 96 screenwriter David Sale and featured several actors who would go on to appear in Number 96.

In 1972 Cash Harmon responded to the Ten Network's request by head of drama Ian Holmes for an Australian series equivalent to British soap opera Coronation Street. Enlisting the services of Johnny Whyte who had previously been a screenwriter for that series and David Sale, who created the general outline and the original characters.

Cash-Harmon came up with Number 96. The serial began on-air in March 1972 in an evening timeslot and was an instant hit.

Cash Harmon Television used a regular team of writers on its projects including Whyte, Sale and others such as Ken Shadie, Eleanor Witcombe and Lynn Foster.

Cash became ill in November 1972 and died in January the following year. However the company continued under the same name with his wife Nancy Sales Cash now serving as co-producer.

Cash Harmon created a feature film version of Number 96 in late 1973. With just a single program in production, the company attempted to expand in late 1974 by launching a new daily serial, this time for the Nine Network. The new show, The Unisexers, was created by Number 96 scriptwriter Anne Hall and used several other current Number 96 writers including Johnny Whyte and Derek Strahan.

The early evening timeslot of The Unisexers meant that the writers were restricted in what content they could include, with much of the adult Number 96-style action forbidden. The Unisexers debuted in February 1975 but proved to be a ratings disaster. It was quickly cancelled and was taken off the air after only three weeks and 15 half-hour episodes had been screened.

In 1976, several attempts to spin off new situation comedy series from Number 96 failed; subsequently, with Number 96 cancelled in 1977, Cash Harmon Television was dissolved.

Several former employees later collaborated on Network Ten soap Arcade in 1980. Arcade was a critical and popular failure and abruptly cancelled after 30 episodes, although 50 episodes had been produced.

== Sources ==
- Mercado, A. (2004) Super Aussie Soaps, Pluto Press Australia: Sydney. ISBN 1-86403-191-3.
- Moran, A. (1993) Moran's Guide to Australian TV Series, Allen & Unwin: Sydney. ISBN 0-642-18462-3.
