= Ronne Arnold =

Australian dancer (1938–2020)

- Born: 1938; Philadelphia, Pennsylvania, United States
- Died: 13 February 2020 (aged 81–82); Katoomba, New South Wales, Australia
- Citizenship: Australian
- Education: Philadelphia Dance Academy, University of the Arts
- Occupations: Dancer; choreographer; dance teacher; singer; actor; comedian; company founder/artistic director
- Years active: 1959-2013
- Career
- Dances: Classical dance; modern dance; primitive dance; Hindu dance
- Awards: Lifetime Achievement Award by the Australian Dance Awards
- Honours: Lifetime Achievement Award

Ronne Arnold (1938 – 13 February 2020), also credited as Ronnie Arnold, was an African American performer whose Australian-based career spanned some seven decades and encompassed various genres. He was a dancer, choreographer, tutor, singer and actor and dance company founder.

== Biography ==
Arnold was born in Philadelphia, Pennsylvania in 1938. He was trained in jazz traditions by his family, and his first dance teacher, Nadia Chilkovsky Nahumck, taught him American classical, modern, primitive and Hindu dance styles at the Philadelphia Dance Academy. In 1959, he graduated with a Bachelor of Music majoring in dance from the University of the Arts.

In 1960, Arnold joined the touring cast of West Side Story for Garnet Carroll in Australia, and before he returned to the United States, he was offered a role in the musical The Most Happy Fella, after which he decided to remain in Australia permanently. He became a renowned teacher of jazz and modern dance, and choreographed dance sequences for Sydney's Chequers nightclub, as well performing as the Leading Player in the 1974 Australian production of Pippin and appearing with Carlotta in a production of Cinderella as the evil stepmother at the Sydney Opera House. He was founder and artistic director of the Contemporary Dance Company of Australia from 1967 to 1972, and academic course director at the National Aboriginal and Islander Skills Development Association from 1986 to 2003. After completing a master's degree at the University of Sydney, he began teaching at the Wesley Institute.

In August 2013, Arnold was awarded the lifetime achievement award at the Australian Dance Awards. He also worked as a television actor, appearing in recurring roles on Number 96 and Holiday Island.

== Death ==
Arnold died on 13 February 2020, aged 81 or 82, at Blue Mountains Hospital in Katoomba, New South Wales.

== Filmography ==
Title	Year	Role
The Stranger (TV mini-series)	1965	Dr. Kamutsu
Number 96	1972 (18 episodes)	Chad Farrell
Spyforce (TV series)	1972	Lance-Corporal Wada (credited as Ronnie Arnold)
Cop Shop (TV series)	1978	Arnie (credited as Ronnie Arnold)
Skyways (TV series)	1979	Rick
Kingswood Country (TV series)	1982	John J. Benson
Holiday Island (TV series)	1981-1982 (26 episodes)	Alex Utalo
Special Squad (TV series)	1984	Kwan (credited as Ronnie Arnold)
Body Business (TV movie)	1986	Henry Style
Billy's Holiday	1995	Video Clip Dancer
Cass (TV movie)	1978	Mulafa Choreography
