= The Group (Australian TV series) =

- Genre: Situation comedy
- Written by: David Sale
- Starring: Ken James; Gregory de Polnay; Wendy Hughes; Gregory Ross; Roslyn Wilson; Terry O'Neill; Jenee Welsh
- No. of seasons: 1
- No. of episodes: 14

Production
- Producer: Don Cash - Bill Harmon
- Production company: Cash Harmon

Original release
- Network: Seven Network
- Release: January 1971 – August 1971

The Group is an Australian situation comedy series broadcast by the Seven Network, produced by Cash Harmon Television and written by David Sale. The pilot episode was screened by the network on 25 January as one of four Australian series it was considering commissioning. It then, Bob Ellis wrote, 'invited the vast audience to write in and say which ones they liked.'

== Synopsis ==
The situation involved five young flatmates—three men and two women—living together for financial and pragmatic reasons and regularly attempting to outwit their landlord, Tinto, who was convinced the residents were behaving antisocially and either chasing them for the rent or trying to evict them. Tinto's assumption that his tenants were leading amoral lives prefigured the 1973 British sitcom Man About the House. He is frequently on the phone to his far more liberated mother - seemingly the actual owner of the building - complaining about the group's behaviour.

The regular characters were named on screen with a freeze frame as they made their entrance at the start of each episode. Each credit also featured a brief description of the character, such as 'MARK the medical student', 'JENNIFER the student', 'BOB the accountant', 'JEREMY he's something in television', 'TINTO the landlord'.

The final character was Laura Bent, the dumb brunette, a model unaware of her physical attractiveness. Laura was the key character around which most of the show's situations revolved. Her caption would change every episode and formed the title of the episode, such as "and LAURA this week she's on a diet", "This Week She Wants to Be a Singer", "This Week She Travels", etc.

Ellis described The Group's pilot as featuring 'graceful studio direction, and... a chirpy overall feeling of ensemble vivaciousness'; it was, he said, 'a cheery, friendly, viable show.'

== Cast ==
=== Regular ===
- Ken James as Mark Sebel
- Jennee Welsh as Jennifer
- Gregory Ross as Bob
- Gregory de Polnay as Jeremy
- Terry O'Neill as Tinto
- Roslyn Wilson as Laura Bent

=== Guests ===
- Ben Gabriel as Mr Sebel
- Bettina Welch
- Elisabeth Kirkby
- Lynn Rainbow
- Tom Oliver
- Noeline Brown as Pamela
- Rory O'Donoghue as Rory
- Nick Lathouris as Hilary Underwood
- Janne Coghlan as Welfare Worker
- Tim Eliott as Moustooch

The role of Laura Bent was played by Roslyn Wilson, cast at the last minute when the original actress, Wendy Hughes, was released to take a role in a production of Butterflies are Free. Wilson had not acted professionally, but she had performing experience in amateur theatre and as a singer-guitarist. At the time she auditioned for The Group, she was working as a secretary in an advertising agency and had, producer Don Harmon said at the time, 'the same quality of innocence that Marilyn Monroe used to have.'

== Production personnel ==
The series was produced by Don Cash and Bill Harmon, devised by Anne Hall and most episodes were written by David Sale, who the following year collaborated on the phenomenally successful soap opera Number 96. At least one episode ('This week she has a fellow') was written by Marcus Cooney. Despite its popularity The Group was not renewed beyond its original series of 13 half-hour episodes.

Many of the actors who had featured briefly in The Group, including Bettina Welch, Elisabeth Kirkby and Tom Oliver, would become staples in Number 96 while Ken James starred in its companion show, The Box.

== See also ==
- List of Australian television series
