= Philippa Baker =

Philippa Baker may refer to:

- Philippa Baker (actress) (1932–2026), Australian actress
- Philippa Baker (rower) (born 1963), New Zealand former rower and politician
