= Arcade (TV series) =

Australian television series

- Genre: Soap opera
- Written by: David Sale; Johnny Whyte
- Starring: Lorrae Desmond; Aileen Britton; Syd Heylen; Tracy Mann; Jeremy Kewley; Christine Harris
- Theme music composer: Mike Perjanik
- Opening theme: "(Walking Through An) Arcade" performed by Doug Parkinson
- Country of origin: Australia
- Original language: English
- No. of episodes: 50 (30 aired)

Production
- Producer: Peter Benardos
- Running time: 25 minutes

Original release
- Network: Network Ten
- Release: 20 January – 29 February 1980

Arcade is an Australian television soap opera which aired on Network Ten from 20 January 1980 to 29 February 1980. Following the broadcast of the 76-minute premiere episode, the series then ran five nights a week, Mondays to Fridays, as a 25-minute serial. It was produced solely by Network Ten (as an in-house production) with a start-up budget of almost $1 million. Arcade was set in a fictitious shopping mall in the northern suburbs of Sydney. The show dealt with the lives and loves of the characters who worked at the various stores within the shopping complex. It is regarded as one of the least successful dramas in the history of Australian television.

== Production ==
Arcade, aired as a 76-minute pilot episode that was produced by Bill Harmon and Peter Benardos who had earlier produced the highly successful soap opera Number 96 and also employed Number 96's creator David Sale and its veteran scriptwriter Johnny Whyte as scriptwriters. Like Number 96, there was some room for light comedy as well as drama.

Rupert Murdoch had acquired what was then the 0-10 Network, (the forerunner to Network Ten) in 1979 and had ATV Melbourne change its call sign from 0 to 10 in January 1980 to make the network complete.

So the launch of the pilot (or "movie-length opening episode") of Arcade was therefore seen as the "flagship" program of the brand-new Network Ten. On the night it aired (Sunday 20 January 1980), the 0–10 Network officially became known as Network Ten to reflect ATV-0's transition to ATV-10 – although the Brisbane station continued to broadcast as TVQ-0 until 10 September 1988. On 27 December 1987, Adelaide's SAS-10 gave ADS-7 the affiliation rights of Network Ten, and became known as ADS-10. (Perth's NEW-10 did not go to air until May 1988.)

The plan was to have the show on the air before the ratings season started to build an audience, however the serial quickly proved itself a ratings disaster, which actually caused the shows on rival networks it was programmed against to improve in the ratings. A total of 50 episodes were actually filmed and produced, but the series was cancelled after six weeks, so only 30 episodes ever went to air.

=== Set designs ===
Rupert Murdoch in collaboration with the network spent almost $1 million to pour a new concrete floor in Studio A at the Sydney Channel 10 studios; install a complete new lighting grid and lighting system; new editing software; upgraded control rooms and cameras and, of course, the construction of the massive Arcade set itself.

The shows set was one of the most elaborate and realistic ever built for an Australian Studio at the time

Not long before the show was axed, there was talk the series might be moved to a later time slot allowing it to become a bit "raunchier" (similar to the hit series Number 96) and a large new set had been built featuring a "western-style" saloon bar, so that more of the action could take place in a venue that supplied alcohol.

There were also moves (before the show was axed) to have some of the regular characters "perform" in the bar/nightclub setting, as many of the actors appearing in the show had a background as cabaret artists, singers, comedians and so on, and it was felt that these skills should be utilised and might help save the series. However, the series was cancelled before these plans could be brought to fruition.

The shops featured in the initial episodes were:

- Kitty's Record Bar (a record and tape store)
- Aristocrat (a dry cleaning store)
- FlashBack Leisure Centre (a pinball parlour)
- Toby's (a sit down restaurant)
- Pendleton's Health Studio (a health and workout studio)
- The Bookworm (a book store and news agency)
- Magda's Gifts (a gift shop)
- Surf 'n' Ski (a sports shop specialising in water sports)

In later episodes, a small (illegal) casino was introduced in an apartment above the Arcade - many of the characters lived in apartments above the Arcade - and at the time the series was taken off air, a large new set had been built featuring a nightclub and bar called "The Sawmill".

== Theme music ==
The disco-style, metaphoric theme song "(Walking Through an) Arcade" was composed by New Zealand-born Mike Perjanik and performed by Australian singer Doug Parkinson. The opening title sequence feature aerial shots of a real building and shopping arcade, which was actually the exterior of the Strata Motor Hotel located on Military Road, in Cremorne.

== Cast ==
Lorrae Desmond (later of A Country Practice fame) played Molly Sparks, the exuberant thrice-divorced owner of the Bookworm News Agency, that she ran with her gossipy sister Miriam Buxton (played by Peggy Toppano, the mother of Prisoner star Peta Toppano) Molly's energetic but bumbling son Joey Fellows was played by comic relief Greg Bepper. The prissy Miriam lived with Molly and Joey for a while.

Mike Dorsey from Number 96 was cast in a regular role as Vic Marshall, the owner of the pinball parlour. Vic's paraplegic daughter Tina (who worked in the pinball parlour with her overprotective father) was played by South Australian newcomer Christine Harris, whilst Coral Drouyn went on to become a successful scriptwriter

Other recognisable actors in the cast included another Number 96 veteran, Aileen Britton who played Joyce Blair, the haughty woman who ran the Aristocrat Dry Cleaning store with her comical husband Walter, played by one time vaudeville comedian Syd Heylen. Tracy Mann played Susie Blair, Joyce and Walter's dry and slightly sardonic daughter, who helped out at her folks dry cleaners, after returning home from a religious cult she fled from.

Joy Miller, played Kitty Adams, a former cabaret singer who was the owner of Kitty's Record Bar and Danny Adcock as Duncan Adams, Kitty's estranged husband and former showbiz manager, who are constantly arguing.

Maggie Stuart appeared as grasping vixen Iris Pendleton, (the villain of the piece) who co-owned the Pendletons Health Studio with her nerdy brother-in-law Norman (Garth Meade), whom she is conniving to get rid of, with the aid of the dim-witted gym instructor Len Crosby (Bill Charlton), with whom she became pregnant. Iris had been married to Norman's late brother, Michael.

Coral Drouyn, billed as Coral Kelly, played Consuela McPhee, the newly hired 'full figured' receptionist at the Health Studio, who was despised by the vengeful Iris. Despite this, Consuela and Norman became a mismatched set of friends.

Annie Semler (wife of Oscar-winning cinematographer Dean Semler) got a lot of media attention at the time for playing the outrageous, somewhat provocative but very well-meaning Hungarian gift shop owner Magda Yokochek. Magda was quite the hilarious character, with her continually calling everyone "darling"; her mangling of the English language (she called what she sold "Knicker knockeries") and her interactions with her tax advisor, Mr. Sponge. However, more seriously, Magda was an illegal immigrant who was looking for a wealthy man to marry to secure her residency in Australia.

Lucy Taylor and Raymond Nock as Si Wan and Philip Soo, the mother and son operators of Toby's (the sit-down cafe and restaurant), and Sinan Leong played the spoiled and pampered Mee Ling, Si Wan's daughter, and Philip's sister who balked at working at the family restaurant. In the 'shocking' storyline in the early episodes, Philip, a potential Olympic swimmer, realized he was falling in love with his sister. Fortunately, that attraction fizzled, and Mee Ling was arranged to marry a much older man named Chang Li.

Patrick Ward played conceited – and rather dimwitted – Craig Carmichael, who owned the Surf-n-Ski Sports shop, but spent most of his time trying to get work as a male model. His girlfriend Di Smith, played by former ballerina Olga Tamara, managed the shop on his behalf.

Jeremy Kewley played Robbie Stewart, a mysterious young man who turns out to be the younger brother of surf shop owner Craig Carmichael (whose real name was Stan Stewart, but he had changed it to Craig Carmichael which he thought was a sexier name for a male model). It would be later revealed that Di was the daughter of a wealthy man, and it was she who had gotten Craig his successful modeling jobs. She was tempted to blab this secret when he got quite obnoxious. She would also get mad at him later on when he had an affair with troublemaking Iris.

== Reception ==
Robert Fidgeon of the Herald Sun named Arcade as one of "Australia's All-time Top 50 TV Turkeys". He stated "Lorrae Desmond led a team of troupers through this expensive soap set in a Sydney shopping arcade. Lasted 10 episodes." In 2020, Fidgeon's colleague Fiona Byrne included Arcade in her feature about "long forgotten Australian TV dramas that made viewers switch off." She noted that it "has long been referred to as one of Australian TV's greatest flops." Of its demise, Byrne wrote: "The show was supposed to pull viewers away from its cross channel rivals: The Sullivans on the Nine Network and Willesee at Network Seven. Instead those shows grew their audiences as viewers said 'no thank you' to Ten's awful offering. Thirty episodes aired before the show was replaced by re-runs of M*A*S*H. I think it should be dug out of the archives and given another run just for fun."
