= Jeff Kevin =

Australian retired actor (born 1944)

- Born: 1944 (age 81–82)
- Other names: Jeffrey Kevin
- Occupations: Actor; theatre director; choreographer; writer; drama lecturer
- Years active: 1966-2010, 2021-present
- Known for: Number 96
- Spouse(s): Suzanne Church (actress) (married; 1977)

Jeffrey Kevin (born 1944) is an Australian actor, theatre director, choreographer, writer, and former drama lecturer best known for his role in the television soap opera Number 96, from 1972 to 1977 as Arnold Feather for 338 episodes.

His character was involved in some of the more-remarkable story lines in the program, including his marriage to Patti Olsen and her subsequent death at the hands of the "Pantyhose Strangler". He also fell in love with Robyn Ross, who he did not realise was transgender. That broke new ground for a TV serial, in that Ross was played by cabaret artist Carlotta, who was the first transgender actress to portray a transgender character anywhere in the world.

== Career ==
Jeffrey Kevin was born in 1944 and started his performance career in theatre in the late 1960s and by the early 1970s, started appearing in several television guest appearances, including roles in the Crawford Productions police dramas Homicide and Division 4, and in police dramas The Long Arm and The Link Men.

In 1972, Kevin was cast in the comedic role of 19-year-old, unlucky-in-love Arnold Feather in the soap opera Number 96, although Kevin was 27 at the time. The role was created by series screenwriter Johnny Whyte. Feather continued in the role from mid-1972 until the series ended in August 1977. He also appeared in the series' 1974 spin-off film, Number 96. During 1977, Arnold's character was briefly phased out and replaced by his twin brother, Charles "Chook" Feather, also played by Kevin.

In the late 1970s, he acted in the serial The Sullivans and made an appearance in Skyways. In 1988, he briefly acted in the soap opera Home and Away as Catholic priest Father Rawlings.

In 2003, Kevin became a drama lecturer at Wollongong University he since retired, but as of 2021 and 2025 still works as an actor and director in occasionally local theatre.

== Personal life ==
Kevin married English-born Australian actress and model, Suzanne Church (born (9 October 1951 (age 74)), in August 1977. She had also appeared in Number 96, as Jane Chester.

== Filmography ==
Year	Title	Role	Type
1969	Division 4	Gary Vickers	TV series
1969	Voyage Out	Peter	TV movie
1970	The Link Men	Benito Costello	TV series
1970	The Long Arm	Tony	TV series
1970	Eden House	Bernie	TV movie
1969–71	Homicide	Various roles	TV series
1972–77	Number 96	Arnold Feather / Chook Feather	TV series
1974	Number 96	Arnold Feather	TV movie
	The Sullivans		TV series
1979–81	Skyways	Geoff Goodwin	TV series
1988	Home and Away	Father Rawlings	TV series
1991	The Miraculous Mellops	Mr. O'Neil	TV series
1993	Tonight Live with Steve Vizard	Guest	TV series

== Theatre ==
source: AusStage database

Production	Writer/Company	Year	Shows	Production Status	Type	Reference
Two Programs of Short Plays	Writer-Michael Thomas/ NIDA production company	1966 (September)	1	non-world premiere/Australian English	spoken word/one act	EI = 153773
Point of Departure	Jean Anouilh / NIDA	1967	1	non-world premiere	spoken word//historical	EI
Three Men on a Horse	George Abbott/John Cecil Holm	1967	1	non-world premiere (US English) (Broadway original)	spoken word/comedy farce	
The Winter's Tale	Shakespeare	1967 (July)	1	non-world premiere (British English)	spoken word/romantic/tragi-comedy	3661
The Rise and Fall of Boronia Aveunue	Tony Morphett	1969	1	Australian premiere production	spoken word/Australian National Identity	
Rooted	Alexander Buzo/NIDA production	1969	1	Australian premiere production	spoken word/Australian National Identity	
The Legend of King O'Malley	Michael Boddy	1971	1	non-world premiere/tour production	Musical theatre (Historical/Musical/Musical Biography)	
Edward John Eyre/The Soldier's Tale		1971 featuring New Sydney Woodwind Quintet and Sinfonia of Sydney)	1	World premiere	Operetta/Musical Theatre	EI= 154327
King Edward (note; Kevin serves here as stage director)	William Leonard Marshall	1971	1	Australian premiere production	spoken word /one man show Gordon Chater	248205
Truth	David Young	1971	1	Australian premiere production	spoken word/historical	
Childhead's Doll	Willy Young	1971	1	Australian premiere production	Musical	
Small Craft Warnings	Tennessee Williams/Independent Theatre	1974	1	non-world premiere	spoken word/drama	
Star Turns		1978	1		Musical production	
Bedroom Farce	Alan Ayckbourn	1980	9 shows (tour)	National tour (English Australia)	spoken word	
Same Time, Next Year (play)	Bernard Slade	1986	1	non-world premiere	spoken word	
Trumpets and Raspberries	Dario Fo	1987	1	non-world premiere (original text Italian)	Comedy/Satire	
Juno and the Paycock	Sean O'Casey	1988	1	Professional, (non world premiere) Irish	Comedy/Tragedy	EI 74287
Mother Courage	Bertolt Brecht	1989	1	non-world premiere (German)	Theatre (spoken word)	ET 1829
Hating Alison Ashley (novel)	Richard Tullock	1989	1	non-world premiere	spoken word/Youth theatre	
The Christian Brothers	Ron Blair'	1991	2	non-world premiere	theatre - spoken word	
The Cherry Orchard	Anton Chekhov	1991		spoken word	EI 15845	
The Tragedy of Richard III	Shakespeare	1992	3 shows		Theatre (spoken word)	
Twelfth Night	Shakespeare	1993		Theatre (spoken word (English Australian))	145252	
A Christmas Carol	Charles Dickens	1993	2 shows (return season)		Theatre (spoken word (English Australian)	
The Time is Not Yet Ripe	Louis Esson	1996		non-world premiere	Theatre (spoken word)	
Hamlet	Shakespeare	2002	4 shows		Theatre/drama (spoken. word)	EI 19224
Kangaroo	Adaptation of D. H. Lawrence novel	2003	1	World premiere	Theatre (spoken word)	
The Stranger	Agatha Christie	2021	1	World premiere	theatre (spoken word)	
The Last Resort		2023	1		Theatre (spoken word/Comedy/drama	
The Glass Menagerie	Tennessee Williams	2023	1		Theatre (spokon word)	
Shakespeare R and J	as Director	2025	1	Theatre (spoken word)		
