= Elaine Lee (actress) =

South African-born actress

- Born: Elaine Joyce Knoesen; 23 February 1939; Springs, Transvaal, Province, South Africa
- Died: 17 September 2014 (aged 75); Sydney, New South Wales, Australia
- Occupation: Actress
- Spouse: Garth Meade (1970–1976)

Elaine Joyce Knoesen (23 February 1939 – 17 September 2014) better known professionally as Elaine Lee, was a South African-born actress of radio and theatre and stage. She made her film debut in her native South Africa in 1968, but became best known in Australia for her role of fashion designer Vera Collins Sutton in the 1970s television soap opera Number 96.

== Career ==
Lee was born in 1939 in Springs, Transvaal Province (present-day Gauteng), and grew up on a gold mine until her father, an electrician, died when she was nine. She was brought up by her mother and had a sister Barbara. A former waitress, her acting career began in the 1960s in Johannesburg where she became a stage manager for a theatrical company and acted extensively in the theatre and on radio, starring in productions throughout her native South Africa, as well as Zimbabwe and Zambia.

Lee emigrated to Australia where she became well known Vera Collins in Number 96, starting in 1972. Lee was known as a sex symbol through the role of Vera, a perpetually unlucky-in-love fashionista and clairvoyant. Lee was an original cast member of the series and a key figure in many of the show's major storylines. Vera was raped three times, including by her onscreen husband Harry Collins (Norman Yemm). Lee remained in the role of Vera for four and a half years, finally leaving in mid-1976. She appeared in the 1974 feature film version of Number 96 in which she was raped by a group of bikers in the opening scene. Producer David Sale said that Number 96 was always going to be controversial and shocking, so we thought "start the film version with a rape sequence and get it over with".

A planned comedy spinoff from Number 96, called Fair Game and featuring Lee with Lynette Curran and Abigail, did not eventuate. Its pilot was divided up to create segments of three episodes of Number 96 (Episodes 1079–1081, airing in Sydney, November 1976).

Soon after leaving Number 96 Lee was cast as headmistress Margaret Gibson in Glenview High, which ran between 1977 and 1978. She then appeared in several productions of the Australian Broadcasting Corporation, in TV movies and panel shows, and made guest appearances in drama series such as A Country Practice. She also continued her stage work, including the challenging one-woman show Turn on the Heat, loosely based on the last two hours of Marilyn Monroe's life.

Lee made sporadic appearances in Australian feature films during the 1990s. In 1997, she played a regular role in the critically panned Kingswood Country spin-off situation comedy Bullpitt!, and she had a recurring role in Heartbreak High.

In the 2000s Lee continued to make occasional appearances in Australian films and drama series, and she opened an acting school in Sydney with Judi Farr. In 2001 she appeared in the medical drama All Saints and in 2005 acted in soap opera Home and Away. Lee also presented a commentary on the 2006 DVD release of Number 96

== Personal life ==
Lee married South African-born Australian actor and comedian Garth Meade, with whom she had emigrated to Australia, in 1970. The marriage ended in divorce in 1976. Meade died of cancer in 2002, aged 77. A spiritual woman, Lee took up tarot card reading like her Number 96 character, and had a strong belief in reincarnation and the occult. Lee was a heavy smoker and suffered from related health issues including emphysema and subsequently had to use an oxygen tank. In her later years she fractured her hip, she died, aged 75, on 17 September 2014 in Sydney, Australia.

Elaine Lee at the time of Number 96, was a neighbour of actresses Gwen Plumb and her partner, actress Thelma Scott

== Filmography ==
FILM

| Year | Title | Role | Type |
|---|---|---|---|
| 1968 | Dr. Kalie | Marge | Film debut, South Africa |
| 1969 | Petticoat Safari | | Film, South Africa |
| 1974 | Number 96 | Vera Collins | Feature film |
| 1977 | Gone to Ground | Grace Ferguson | TV film |
| 1979 | Detective Philip Vernay | | Film short |
| 1984 | Super Sleuth | Harriet Barker | TV film |
| 1987 | Olive | Elaine | TV film |
| 1994 | The Sum of Us | Woman on Train | Feature film |
| 1994 | Dallas Doll | Mrs Winthrop | Feature film |
| 2000 | Sunday | Gwen | Film short |
| 2000 | Dogwoman: Dead Dog Walking | Freda Bell | TV film |
| 2005 | BlackJack: In The Money | Astrologer | TV film |
| 2006 | Photograph | Lydia | Film short |

TELEVISION

| Year | Title | Role | Type |
|---|---|---|---|
| 1971 | Diamantendetektiv Dick Donald | Marion Kingsley | TV series, Germany (season 1, episode 7) |
| 1973 | The Evil Touch | Marion Field | TV series (season 1, episode 13) |
| 1972–76 | Number 96 | Vera Collins / Vera Sutton | TV series |
| 1976 | Fair Game | | TV pilot |
| 1976 | Number 96: And They Said It Wouldn't Last | Herself as Presenter / Vera Collins | TV special |
| 1977 | Number 96: The Final Episode | Herself with Number 96 cast | TV special |
| 1977–1978 | Glenview High | Margaret Gibson | TV series (39 episodes) |
| 1978; 1983 | The Mike Walsh Show | Guest – Herself with Joe Martin | TV series, 1 episode |
| 1980 | Spring & Fall | Socialite | TV series, 1 episode |
| 1982; 1993 | A Country Practice | Lillian Saunders; Laurel Davies; April Patterson | TV series (12 episodes) |
| 1982 | MPSIB | Lola Birch | TV series, 1 episode |
| 1983 | Cop Shop | Faith Bloomfield | TV series, 1 episode |
| 1983 | The Mike Walsh Show | Guest – Herself | TV series, 1 episode |
| 1985 | Anzacs | Madame | TV miniseries, 4 episodes |
| 1989 | Rafferty's Rules | Mrs. Prattley | TV series, 1 episode |
| 1992 | The Morning Show | Herself (with Belinda Giblin) | TV series, 1 episode |
| 1992 | The Midday Show | Herself (with Belinda Giblin) | TV series, 1 episode |
| 1993 | Tonight Live with Steve Vizard | Herself | TV series, 1 episode |
| 1996 | Good Morning Australia | Herself & Paul Karo | TV series, 1 episode |
| 1997–98 | Heartbreak High | Maria Costello | TV series (5 episodes) |
| 1997–98 | Bullpitt! | Joan Collins | TV series (26 episodes) |
| 1998 | Burke's Backyard | Herself | TV series, 1 episode |
| 2000 | Bondi Banquet | Drusilla Owens | TV series |
| 2000 | Flipper | | TV series, 1 episode US |
| 2001 | All Saints | Phyllis Martin | TV series (Season 4, episode 11) |
| 2002 | The Best of Aussie Drama | Herself | TV special |
| 2005 | Home and Away | Joy Foxton | TV series (9 episodes) |
| 2006 | Number 96... The Final Years | Herself | DVD/Video |
| 2006 | Ten News | Guest – Herself with Number 96 cast: Sheila Kennelly, Lynn Rainbow, Deborah Gray & Wendy Blacklock | TV series, 1 episode |
| 2006 | Mornings with Kerri-Anne | Guest - Herself with David Sale, Andrew Mercado & Deborah Gray | TV series, 1 episode |
| 2006 | A Current Affair | Herself | TV series, 1 episode |
| 2007 | Where Are They Now? | Herself – Guest with Number 96 cast: Joe Hasham, Chard Hayward, Sheila Kennelly, Chantal Contouri, James Elliott, Elizabeth Kirkby, Jeff Kevin, & Frances Hargreaves | TV series, 1 episode |
| 2010 | The Playlist | Guest – Herself & David Sale (writer) | TV series, 1 episode |
| 2012 | Breakfast | Herself – Guest with Number 96 cast: Martin Harris, Elizabeth Kirkby, Vivienne Garrett, Louise Howitt & David Sale (writer) | TV series, 1 episode |
