= Elisabeth Kirkby =

Australian politician (1921–2026)

The Honourable Elisabeth Kirkby OAM
- Official portrait of Member of Parliament Elisabeth Kirkby

Member of the New South Wales Legislative Council
- In office 27 October 1981 – 25 June 1998
- Succeeded by: Arthur Chesterfield-Evans

Councillor for Temora, New South Wales
- In office 1999–2004

Personal details
- Born: Elisabeth Wilma Burton Kirkby; 26 January 1921 Bolton, Lancashire, England
- Died: 20 April 2026 (aged 105) Morning Bay, New South Wales, Australia
- Citizenship: Australian
- Party: Australian Democrats (1981–1998)
- Other political affiliations: Australian Progressive Alliance (2003–2004)
- Children: 3
- Education: University of Sydney
- Occupation: Politician; actress; radio broadcaster; stage manager; writer; commentator; producer; director
- Known for: Number 96 (TV series as "Lucy Sutcliffe")
- Military career
- Allegiance: United Kingdom
- Branch: Auxiliary Territorial Service
- Rank: Stars in Battledress
- Conflicts: World War II

Elisabeth Wilma Burton Kirkby (26 January 1921 – 20 April 2026) was a British-born Australian politician, actress, radio broadcaster, producer, director and screenwriter, sheep and wheat farmer and theatre founder.

Kirkby entered politics in 1977 serving as state parliamentary leader with the Australian Democrats in the New South Wales Legislative Council from 1981 to 1998, after which she served a shorter tenure with the Australian Progressive Alliance party with a seat on local government, as a councillor for Temora from 1999 and 2004.

Prior to her political career Kirkby worked in the entertainment arts, having started as an assistant stage manager in her native England in 1938 before becoming an actress in theatre, radio, television and film productions. After working for some years in England starting her career, she relocated to British Malaya in 1950 after her husband was offered a medical position there, and noting the lack of theatre, served instead as a radio broadcaster, producer, director and screenwriter. She emigrated to Australia in 1965, where she continued her acting career and became known for her small screen role as Lucy Sutcliffe in the serial Number 96.

== Early life ==
Kirkby was born in Welbeck Road in Bolton, Lancashire, (now part of Greater Manchester) north-west England on 26 January 1921, to James Burton Kirkby and Frances Robinson. Kirkby's family moved to Turton before she was one. She grew up during the dark years of the Great Depression and noted the closure of numerous cotton mills, native to the area during this period. She attended Nottingham Girls High School.

== Entertainment career ==
Having worked as an assistant stage manager, Kirkby started her performance career in the United Kingdom in theatre, joining the Manchester Repertory Theatre in 1939. In 1942 she joined the Liverpool Repertory Theatre, where she worked for a year before joining the Birmingham Repertory Theatre. During the Second World War, she spent three years working for the war effort with the woman's branch of the British Army—the Auxiliary Territorial Service—as an entertainer, writer and producer for Stars in Battledress. Kirkby appeared in telemovies in the UK including Mr. Bolfrey, and the televised play Love from a Stranger which was based on a stage production written by Frank Vosper from a novel by Agatha Christie.

Kirkby relocated to Sydney, Australia in 1965, where she wrote and produced documentaries and educational programs for the Australian Broadcasting Commission (ABC). After her stint at the ABC, she moved to commercial television, appearing in guest starring drama roles. These included Riptide, The Rovers, Crawford Productions' espionage drama Hunter, their police drama Homicide, and in the serial The Group.

Her next role was that of Lucy Sutcliffe in the soap opera Number 96. The character of Lucy was devised by writer David Sale, who had previously cast her in The Group. He based Lucy and her husband Alf Sutcliffe (played by James Elliott) after his own parents from Lancashire, England, even naming the character of Lucy after his mother. "The only difference," said Sale, "was my parents from native England loved Australia, so to make it a little interesting we would have the character of Alf, as the typical whinging Pommy, who was also longing to return to the United Kingdom, despite Lucy's disapproval." Kirkby was an original cast member of Number 96 which premiered March 1972. Unsure of how long the series would last, the producers offered the original cast contracts lasting just six weeks. The show became Australia's 10th highest-rated television program in 1972, was the number 1 highest rating program in 1973 and 1974, and the 6th highest rated program for 1975. The episode in which it was revealed that Lucy's tumour was benign proved to be Number 96's highest-ever rated episode. In late 1973 the show had a feature film spin-off featuring much of the show's current cast, including Kirkby, reprising their television roles. Kirkby provided a commentary for the DVD release of the series alongside co-star Carol Raye and Michael Kirby.

After Number 96 Kirkby went into a theatre run in Melbourne, appearing in The Jockey Club Stakes alongside Robert Coote and Wilfrid Hyde White in late 1975. Kirkby and White had previously met 30 years previously in the entertainment division of the army during World War II. Kirkby subsequently made guest appearances on Australian drama series such as The Outsiders.

== Political career ==
Kirkby entered politics joining the Australian Democrats in 1979. At that time she was residing in Martinsville in the Hunter Valley region of New South Wales, after purchasing a property there on the recommendation of Sheila Kennelly, a friend and longtime resident who had a farm in that area. After relocating there she ran for the local parliament seat for the Hunter Valley, with a publicity campaign using her Number 96 role as the basis, stating there are "96's reasons to vote for Liz". She was not elected, attaining 13% of votes, but was subsequently elected to the New South Wales Legislative Council in 1981, as the party's state leader. Upon retiring in June 1998, she became the longest-serving Australian Democrat member of parliament. She remained in politics at a local government level, serving as a councillor in Temora Shire from 1999 to 2004, with the Democrats spin-off party the Australian Progressive Alliance founded by Meg Lees.

== Personal life and death ==
Kirkby was married to Australian gynaecologist Derek Llewellyn-Jones and had three children, a daughter and two sons, four grandchildren and a great-granddaughter. Her son Tony Llewellyn-Jones is an Australian actor and producer. Debbie Baile, her daughter, became an actress and also appeared in Number 96 in 1975. Baile also acted in The Young Doctors and the film Undercover. Kirkby died on 20 April 2026, at the age of 105.

== Honours ==
In 2006 Kirkby earned an Arts Degree and in 2014 a PhD from the University of Sydney at the age of 93, becoming Australia's oldest university graduate. Her thesis was on unemployment during the Great Depression, and she became an advocate for older people to learn and study. (Note: Although she is the oldest such recipient in Australia, the world record is held by 102 year old German Jewish woman Ingeborg Syllm-Rapoport, who was awarded a doctorate from the University of Hamburg, after originally being denied by the Nazi German Government, some 77 year's earlier.) In 2012 she was awarded the national Medal of the Order of Australia, for "service to the Parliament of New South Wales, to the community of Temora, and to the performing arts".

== Filmography ==
=== Film ===
Year	Title	Role
1946	Mr. Bolfrey (TV movie)	Jean
1947	Love from a Stranger (TV movie)	Mavis Wilson
1974	Number 96 (TV movie)	Lucy Sutcliffe
1976	Number 96 ... And they said it wouldn't last (TV documentary movie)	Herself
1979	Challenging Years (film short)	Jenny Walker

=== Television ===
Year	Title	Role	
1968–1975	Homicide	Mrs. Turnbull / Ruth Mason	TV series
1968	Hunter	Claire Mathison	TV series, 1 episode
1969	Rip Tide	Joyce Todd	TV series, 1 episode
1969	The Rovers	Miss Constable	TV series, 1 episode
1971	The Group		TV series, 1 episode
1972–1975	Number 96	Lucy Sutcliffe	TV series
1976	Number 96: And They Said It Wouldn't Last	Herself	TV special
1977	Number 96: The Final Episode	Herself with Number 96 cast	TV series, 1 episode
1977	The Outsiders	Pat Ryder	ABC TV series, 1 episode
1977	Glenview High	Mrs. Mackay	TV series, 1 episode
1980	Players in the Gallery		TV miniseries
1982	The Mike Walsh Show	Guest - Herself with Terry Norris	TV series, 1 episode
1986	Kids 21st Birthday Channel Ten Telethon	Guest - Herself with Number 96 cast: Johnny Lockwood, Bettina Welch, Pat McDonald, Vicki Raymond, Sheila Kennelly, Wendy Blacklock, Harry Michaels, Chard Hayward, Frances Hargreaves & Abigail taped appearance.	TV special
1996	Where Are They Now?	Guest - Herself with Number 96 actor James Elliott	TV series, 1 episode
2007	Where Are They Now?	Guest - Herself with 'Number 96 cast: Joe Hasham, Chard Hayward, Chantal Contouri, Elaine Lee, Sheila Kennelly, Jeff Kevin, James Elliott & Frances Hargreaves	TV series, 1 episode
2010	Ten News	Guest - Herself	TV series, 1 episode
2012	Breakfast	Herself with Number 96 actors: Elaine Lee, Vivienne Garrett, Martin Harris, Louise Howitt & David Sale (writer)	TV series, 1 episode

== Thesis ==
- Will We Ever Learn From History? The Impact of Economic Orthodoxy on Unemployment during the Great Depression in Australia – doctorate thesis (University of Sydney)

== See also ==
- List of the first women holders of political offices in Oceania

== Notes ==
Party political offices
First parliamentary leader	Leader of the Australian Democrats in New South Wales; 1981–1998	Succeeded by Arthur Chesterfield-Evans
