= Dina Mann =

Australian actress and casting director

- Born: c. 1950 (age 75–76)
- Other name: Diana Mann
- Occupations: Actress, film and television casting director
- Years active: 1970–2014
- Known for: Debbie Chester in Number 96

Dina Mann (born c. 1950), also credited as Diana Mann, is an Australian former actress and later casting director recognised for several television soap opera and film roles from 1970 until 1985, after which she worked as a casting director until 2014. She is probably best known for her role as rebellious 15-year old schoolgirl Debbie Chester in the latter years of TV serial Number 96 in which she featured from 1975 until 1977, in 137 episodes. The character was involved in several controversial storylines including her character being introduced to heroin, and losing her mum in a shark attack.

== Career ==
Mann appeared in numerous character roles starting from the 1970s and specialised in playing characters much younger than herself in adult-themed dramas and comedies. Her roles in Australian television programs, including several appearances in the Crawford Productions police dramas Homicide, Division 4 and Matlock Police, were nearly all teenage characters. Her first television role was in an episode of Delta where she played a 15-year-old who appeared in a semi-nude swimming scene. Mann also played a schoolgirl in the hit sex-comedy feature film Alvin Purple (1973) and was a young female cricketer in its 1974 sequel Alvin Purple Rides Again.

She later played the more permanent role of schoolgirl Debbie Chester in adult soap opera Number 96. She joined the show in late 1975 as part of a new family that was introduced which included Suzanne Church (born United Kingdom, 9 October 1951) as her sister Jane Chester and former radio actress Patti Crocker as her mum Eileen Chester, she continued until its final episode in August 1977. She subsequently played guest roles in prison-based soap opera Prisoner, first appearing as the rebellious Debbie, the daughter of Ken Pearce (Tom Oliver), in 1980 and again in 1981. She reappeared in the series in 1983 playing a different character, and made other guest appearances in Australian television series until the mid-1980s.

Since the mid-1980s she has worked as a casting director on various Australian films and television productions.

== Filmography ==
=== Film ===
Year	Title	Role	Type
1971	Exit	Jessica	Short film
1973	Alvin Purple	Shirley	Feature film
1974	Petersen	Robin	Feature film
1974	Alvin Rides Again	Woman Cricketer	Feature film
1983	A Slice of Life	Barbara	Feature film
1984	Anna	Welfare Officer	TV movie

=== Television ===
Year	Title	Role	Type
1970	Delta	Daphne	TV series, episode: "The Honeymoon Blows"
1973	Ryan	Nikki	TV series, episode: "Tribe"
1971–1974	Homicide	Anne Gardner / Jenny Robinson / Kate Maxwell	TV series, 3 episodes: "Death on the Vine", "The Adventurer", "You've Gotto Do Something"
1972–1974	Division 4	Pup / Nurse / Sally / Bev Compton / Josie / Nancy	TV series, 6 episodes: "Rogues Gallery", "Andrew Shannon", The Oracle", "Traveling Man", "For My Next Trick", "Man of Substance",
1975	Silent Number	Sharon Lane	TV series, episode: "Exposed to Moral Danger"
1973–1975	Matlock Police	Miss Cox / Beris / Shelli	TV series, 3 episodes: "The Recurrence of Randy McBain", "The Germ Bomb", "The Son"
1975–1977	Number 96	Debbie Chester	TV series, 137 episodes
1978	Chopper Squad	Sis	TV series, episode: "Lifeboat"
1979	Skyways	Fiona Woods	TV series, 6 episodes: "Arrivals", "Departures", "Levelling Out", "Overtures", "Knife Edge", "Who Killed Cock Robyn"
1978–1980	Cop Shop	Laurel Drummond / Linda Perry	TV series, 3 episodes
1984	Special Squad	Mandy	TV series, episode: "The Set-Up"
1980; 1984	Prisoner	Debbie Pearce / Samantha Russell	TV series
1984	Infinity Limited	Lucy	TV series
1985	The Flying Doctors	Mrs. Watson	TV series
