= White Man's Legend =

- Written by: Wal Cherry
- Directed by: Geoffrey Nottage
- Starring: Bill Kerr; Deryck Barnes
- Country of origin: Australia
- Original language: English

Production
- Producer: Michael Carson
- Production company: ABC

Original release
- Network: ABC
- Release: 29 July 1984

White Man's Legend is a 1984 Australian television film directed by Geoffrey Nottage and starring Bill Kerr, Patti Crocker and Deryck Barnes. The screenplay concerns an old seaman who buys a boat. It was the first in a collection of six films in the series Sunday Australian Movies and was filmed in the small town of South West Rocks with a budget of $200,000.

== Reception ==
Barbara Hooks of the Age says "Although White Man's Legend won't appeal to all tastes – escapist entertainment it is not – I found it engrossing, mysterious, provocative and elusive. All is not as it seems; indeed, not all is explained. There is much for the viewer to ponder afterwards." In The Sydney Morning Herald Richard Coleman said "The only redeeming features of the first film in the series were the performance of the Aboriginal actor Michael Watson, who spoke his "dunnos" with great authority, and the splendid Wendy Hughes, whose lot it was to the introduce the film and make it sound interesting." John O'Hara writes in Cinema Papers "The film is too slow, its focus on Mac too limited, to allow tragic implications to surface."
