= Lynn Rainbow =

Australian actress

Lynn Rainbow AM
- Born: Lynn Carol Rainbow Reid; 19 September 1942 (age 84); Australia
- Other name: Lynne Rainbow
- Education: Independent Theatre; The University of Paris; Dante Alighieri
- Occupations: Art administrator, philanthropist, former actress, dancer and voice artist
- Years active: As Actress 1960-2002, (briefly 2020-2026, theatre and archival projects, as herself)) Arts administrator 2002-
- Known for: Number 96 (TV series and film version)
- Spouse: Tom Oliver (m.1973-)
- Family: Sir Benjamin Fuller (grandfather); John Fuller (great-grandfather)

Lynn Carol Rainbow-Reid AM (born 19 September 1942) credited also as Lynne Rainbow, is an arts administrator and philanthropist and former actress of stage, radio, television and film, dancer and voice artist and archivist.

== Early life ==
Rainbow was born in Australia to Judge Alfred Ernest Rainbow and his wife.

A fourth generation performer, her great-grandfather was British theatrical tycoon and singer John Fuller, who emigrated to New Zealand and was known as the 'Silver throated tenor of New Zealand'. Her grandfather was also a theatre tycoon, Sir Benjamin Fuller, who established he's own company Fuller's Theatres Circuit, with brother John Fuller Jnr. launching a number of venues across Australasia

Rainbow's mother was a dancer, whose partner was Ron Shand.

Rainbow was educated in Sydney at the Ascham School before studying acting under Dame Doris Fitton at the Independent Theatre school in Sydney. She subsequently attended the Sorbonne in Paris and the Dante Alighieri in Italy, training in physical movement, voice and dance

== Entertainment career ==
Rainbow has worked in the entertainment industry throughout England, the US and her native Australia. Serving as a judge by day, and dancing as Odette/Odile in Swan Lake by night, she has been involved in stage, film, TV and radio for over three decades.

Rainbow began working in theatre with Independent Theatre, before taking television roles from the early 1970s onwards, including guest spots in the Crawford Productions police dramas Homicide, Division 4 and Matlock Police, and in an episode of the situation comedy series The Group. In 1974, she starred as Victoria in a theatre production of Somerset Maugham's Home and Beauty.

She is best known for her role in the TV series Number 96 as original character Sonia Freeman, the chemist, from March 1972. She stayed in the role until 1973, during which time her character was involved in numerous controversial storylines, including Sonia engaging in an apparent incestuous relationship, an inter-racial kiss, with Chad Farrall, (which was apparently the reason why thes series was not able to be sold overseas, primarilty to American) and losing her husband Dr. Gordon Vansard in a car accident (played by Joe James (born Brighton, England , UK; 4 August 1925 - died; Eastern Suburbs (Sydney), New South Wales, Australia; 16 June, 2017) and then suffering a nervous breakdown, before returning exclusively for the film version of the series in a major storyline in which now remarried to a journalist Duncan Hunter whom with his partner flight attendant Diana Moore (played by Rebecca Gilling) are planning to send her mad, to obtain her interitence.

Rainbow reprised the role of Sonia Freeman in the film version of the serial, Number 96, in 1974. In the film, a newly married Sonia returns to Number 96, but again worries she is losing her mind. Rainbow shot all her scenes for the film in a single day, before rushing off to give a theatre performance as Elvira in Blithe Spirit that night.

After Number 96 Rainbow continued to make guest appearances in Australian television drama series, featuring in the miniseries Against the Wind (1978), took a regular role in the soap opera The Young Doctors, guest starred in six episodes of A Country Practice, and appeared in an early episode of Home and Away.

== Personal life and honours ==
Rainbow married British Australia actor Tom Oliver in 1973. They first met on the set of Number 96 (before his long run as Lou Carpenter in Neighbours).

Rainbow was awarded in the Queens Birthday Honours with the Order of Australia (AM) with the citation being for "significant service to the community through support for a range of cultural and charitable organisations, and to the performing arts as an actor".

The Actors' and Entertainers' Benevolent Fund Queensland (of which she is vice-president) honoured Rainbow with the 2024 Alan Edwards Lifetime Achievement Award.

== Filmography (selected) ==
=== Film ===
Year	Title	Role	Type
1974	Number 96	Sonia Hunter	Feature film
1983	Sherlock Holmes and the Sign of Four	Voice	Animated TV movie
1985	Nicholas Nickleby	Voice	Animated TV movie
1993	You and Me and Uncle Bob	Miss Gibbs	TV movie

=== Television ===
Year	Title	Role	Type
1967	Blandings Castle	Aggie	TV series
1967	Room at the Bottom	Wendy	TV series
1968	Misleading Cases	Felicity Haddock	TV series
1969–71	Homicide	Pam Gibson / Anna Leurini / Lucy Le Marc	TV series
1970–72	Division 4	Christine Hassett / Barbie Ryan / Jennie West	TV series
1971	The Group		TV series, 1 episode
1971; 1974	Matlock Police	Jan/Wilma Grimes	TV series
1972–73	Number 96	Sonia Freeman	TV series, 53 episodes
1974	Out of Love		TV series, 1 episode
1976	King's Men		TV series, 1 episode
1978	Against the Wind	Mrs. Louisa Wiltshire	TV miniseries
1978; 1979	Cop Shop	Gloria Matthews / Anne Mitchell	TV series
1980	The Young Doctors	June Holland	TV series
1982; 1984	A Country Practice	Margaret Skilton / Mrs. Quinn / Susan Moore	TV series, 6 episodes
1988	Captain James Cook		TV miniseries, 1 episode
1988–91	Home and Away	Neighbour / Heather Davidson	TV series
2021	Cinematic Revelations	archival documentary as Herself	
2020-2016	Legacy Retrospectives	contributor/subject various documentary's on the history of TV and theatre	

== Radio ==
Years	Company	Works
1960-1970s	ABC Radio National for (ABC National)	Shakespearean plays and classical works for the ABC
1983	Animated feature for Burbank Films	Sherlock Holmes and the Sign of Four Film and radio syndication (as voice artist)
1960-1990	Various	Commercial voice (narrational's and commercial's) voice (as herself)

== Theatre ==
Year	Title	Role	Type
1962	Gods of Red Earth		Independent Theatre, Sydney
1963	The Gallant Tailor		Independent Theatre, Sydney
1967	Little Women	Jo	Jeanetta Cochrane Theatre, London with Bloomsbury Plays Ltd
1969	Eden House		Independent Theatre, Sydney
1970	On Approval	Helen Hayle	St Martins Theatre, Melbourne
1974	Blithe Spirit	Elvira	
1974	Don’t Listen Ladies!		Marian Street Theatre, Sydney
1974	Home and Beauty		Marian Street Theatre, Sydney
1975	How the Other Half Loves		Opera House, Wellington, Auckland, Christchurch with J. C. Williamson & Kerridge Odeon Corporation
1976	Snap!		Independent Theatre, Sydney
1977	The Happy Hunter	Yvonne	Marian Street Theatre, Sydney
1977	Away Match	Lucy Durrant	Marian Street Theatre, Sydney
1980	The Breadwinner	Margery	Marian Street Theatre, Sydney
1987	The Diary of Anne Frank		Phillip Street Theatre, Sydney
1993	Out of Order	Gladys	Comedy Theatre, Melbourne, Regal Theatre, Perth, Her Majesty's Theatre, Adelaide
2024	The Stage on Sunday	Herself	Stables Thearre, Sydney with Seaborn, Broughton & Walford Foundation & Theatre Heritage Australia
