= Patricia Crocker =

Australian actress

Patti Crocker
- Born: Patricia Anne Crocker; 1929; Bankstown, New South Wales
- Died: 15 March 1992 (aged 62–63); Leura, New South Wales
- Occupation: Actress (radio, theatre, television) & author
- Years active: 1940s – 1980s

Patricia Anne Crocker (1929 – 15 March 1992) professionally known as Patti Crocker (no relation to entertainer, Barry Crocker), was an Australian actress associated with the "golden days of radio in Australia", who also appeared in theatre and on television, primarily in soap opera and commercial advertisements. She was the author of a memoir detailing her life and career on both radio and subsequently on television.

== Early life ==
Crocker was born in Bankstown, New South Wales the daughter of Edna May Crocker (née Dingwall 1905 – 18 November 1992) and upholsterer Roy Samuel Crocker (28 February 1906 – 1980). She was educated at Bankstown North Public School and Meriden Church of England Girls Grammar School, Strathfield. At her parents' insistence, she entered the stream for the academically inclined and passed her Leaving Certificate exams in 1948, though without distinction.

Her mother was anxious that she not inherit her own shyness, and accordingly received elocution training from Grace Buist and Harry Thomas and studied piano under Eileen Hanley. She entered, or was entered for, eisteddfods from the age of eight, usually for "humorous recitation", or piano solo, culminating in that of 1941, when she won "Best Entertainer" at an eisteddfod in Sydney against adult performers, and received high praise from the judge.

== Career ==
=== Radio and stage ===
Crocker was a guest on the Youth Show, in 1941, sponsored by Colgate-Palmolive, which first went to air on radio 2GB on 27 July 1940, and became a regular shortly after, with Peggy Hamilton as a comedy duo "Null and Void".

Her first radio acting job was as "Dolly" in the serial Budge (later Budge's Gang) for the Australian Broadcasting Commission's Children's Session from around June 1942, followed by juvenile roles in The Poltergeist and Christa Winsloe's Children in Uniform, which won the Macquarie Award for Catherine Duncan.

She also played stage parts: as "Agnes" in William Saroyan's The Beautiful People at Bryant's Playhouse in 1946 and "Adela", the headstrong youngest daughter in Lorca's The House of Bernarda Alba, at the Metropolitan Theatre in 1951.

Her most enduring role was as "Mandy Gordon", the cheeky youngest daughter of "Dr Neil Gordon" in Gwen Meredith's long running radio serial Blue Hills, on ABC radio. Her part ran from 1949 to 1952, when her character married "Dr Frobisher", played by Max Osbiston, and never reappeared.

In real life she was about to sail with actress Ruth Cracknell to London, but from her return to Australia in 1953 she made frequent guest appearances in a variety of minor roles, and was one of the few (with Queenie Ashton and Osbiston) who played in both the first and last episodes (28 February 1949 and 30 September 1976).

Another radio play of note in which she appeared was White Coolies (1955), by Betty Jeffrey, adapted in 52 episodes by Gwen Friend, sister of artist and notorious hebephile Donald Friend, and starring Ruth Cracknell and June Salter.

=== Television and film production ===
With the advent of television in Australia in the mid-1950s, sponsorship for quality radio drama dried up, and radio stations moved to quiz shows, talkback, and popular music programming. Local TV production at first centred on advertising, of which lucrative market Crocker had her share, but success in drama largely eluded her, perhaps on account of her diminutive 150 cm (4 ft 11 in) stature, until she was cast as "Eileen Chester", a woman with two errant daughters, Debbie and Jane Chester (Dina Mann and Suzanne Church) in serial Number 96. Her character's life ended after being attacked by a shark. Other TV credits included the serials The Outsiders, Luke's Kingdom, Matlock Police, Homicide and Riptide, as well as the TV movie White Man's Legend

In the early 1980s Crocker was involved as a producer on Jess, a movie that was to star (by then expatriate) Australians Diane Cilento and Ed Devereaux. It was to be set in the Depression and drought years of 1930s Australia. Financed by the Film Finance Corporation Australia and with European funding, the movie was never made.

== Family life ==
Crocker married David Davies in 1958 and the couple had a son Michael in 1960. Patricia Davies died in Leura, New South Wales, in 1992.

== Publications ==
- Crocker, Patti (1989). Radio Days. Simon & Schuster. ISBN 0731800982. This important collection of anecdotes makes no claim to being a definitive history of the Australian entertainment industry but provides background on those involved. It throws light on the work of actors such as Peter Finch, Bill Kerr, Michael Pate, Leonard Teale, Rod Taylor, John Meillon, June Salter and Ruth Cracknell, comedians George Wallace, Roy Rene and Jack Davey and variety hosts Bob and Dolly Dyer. The book has a foreword by Queenie Ashton AM with whom Crocker performed on radio serial Blue Hills.

This book has been used as a source for much of this article.
