= Joanna Lockwood =

Australian actress

- Born: Joanna Walker; 4 June 1950 (age 76); Hammersmith, England
- Occupation: Actress
- Years active: 1960-1996
- Known for: Number 96; Cop Shop; Sons and Daughters; E Street
- Spouse(s): Phillip Addison (d.); Terry Walker
- Children: Hayley
- Parent: Johnny Lockwood

Joanna Lockwood is a British Australian actress who has played regular roles in various television series.

== Early life ==
Lockwood was born 'Joanna Walker' on 4 June 1950, in Hammersmith in London. She is the daughter of British-born Australian actor and comedian Johnny Lockwood.

Her first foray into the entertainment industry was in 1960, at the age of 10, appearing opposite her father in a pantomime. They then formed a singing/dancing double act, touring clubs, but her father was concerned about the risks show business posed, and sent her off to business college. She was eventually drawn back however, and formed her own nightclub act, supporting performers such as Harry Secombe and Reg Varney.

== Career ==
Lockwood had roles in Crawford Productions series Homicide, Matlock Police and Division 4. She completed a brief stint in the closing episodes of soap opera Number 96 in 1977 (which had previously starred her father until 1975). She then played the ongoing lead role of police officer's wife and former stripper Valerie Johnson in police drama series Cop Shop, which began on-air in late 1977. She left the show after three-and-a-half years because the commute between Sydney and Melbourne took its toll.

After leaving Cop Shop, Lockwood played Diane Kennedy in the 1988 film To Make a Killing, and had short-term ongoing roles in soap opera Sons and Daughters in the mid-1980s, E Street in 1989, A Country Practice in 1993 and Home and Away in 1996.

== Personal life ==
Lockwood had a daughter Hayley with her first husband Phillip Addison, in Manly, Sydney.

In 2001 she married her second husband, businessman Terry Walker, and moved to the Coffs Harbour region. She is retired from acting and is a grandmother of three.

== Filmography ==
=== Film ===
Year	Title	Role	Type
1988	Vicious (aka To Make a Killing)	Diane Kennedy	Feature film

=== Television ===
Year	Title	Role	Type
1969; 1970	Homicide	Wendy Kaufman / Christine Fisher	TV series, 2 episodes
1972	When We Were Married		TV series
1972	Matlock Police	Susie	TV series, 1 episode
1973	Division 4		TV series, 1 episode
1976	Bellbird		TV series
1977	Number 96	Ros Halliday	TV series, 20 episodes
1977	Number 96: The Final Episode	Ros Halliday/Herself	TV special
1977–81	Cop Shop	Valerie Johnson/Close	TV series, 298 episodes
1978	Chopper Squad	Jan Cummings	TV series, 1 episode
1981	Bellamy	Toni Payne	TV series, episode 26: "Bet Your Life"
1982	Holiday Island		TV series, 1 episode
1982	MPSIB		TV series, 1 episode
1983	Five Mile Creek	Madelaine	TV series, 1 episode
1985; 1990	A Country Practice		TV series, 2 episodes
1985	Sons and Daughters	Jenny Turner	TV series, 35 episodes
1987	Butterfly Island		TV series, 1 episode
1988	Outback Bound	Fiona	TV movie
1988	Rafferty's Rules		TV series, 1 episode
1989	Mission: Impossible	Rita	TV series, 1 episode
1989	The Flying Doctors		TV series, 1 episode
1990	A Country Practice	Sarah	TV series, 1 episode
1992–93	E Street	Sally McKinnon	TV series, 40 episodes
1996	Heartbreak High		TV series
1996	Home and Away	Yvonne	TV series, 1 episode
2007	THS Investigates	Herself - Morgan's Grandmother	TV series US, 1 episode

=== Television (as self) ===
Year	Title	Role	Type
1967	Bassey at Chequers	Guest (with Johnny Lockwood)	TV concert special
1970	In Adelaide Tonight	Guest (with Johnny Lockwood)	TV series
1971	Bandstand	Guest performer (singing "We Can Work It Out")	TV series, 1 episode
1972	In Melbourne Tonight	Herself (with Johnny Lockwood)	TV series
1974–77	You Say the Word	Regular Presenter	TV series
1978	Graham Kennedy's Blankety Blanks	Panelist	TV series, 2 episodes
1980	Celebrity Tattletales	Herself (with Phillip Addison)	TV series, 3 episodes
1981; 1982; 1984	The Mike Walsh Show	Guest	TV series, 4 episodes
1982	The Australian Way: A Salute to Aussie Sex Appeal	Co-host (with Gordon Elliott)	TV special
1985	Daryl Somers' Blankety Blanks	Panelist	TV series, 2 episodes
1986	Hello Australia	Herself	TV pilot
1989	The Bert Newton Show	Guest (with Peter O’Brien)	TV series, 1 episode
1990	In Melbourne Today	Guest	TV series, 1 episode
1990	TV Celebrity Dance Party	Guest performer (singing "Fever")	TV special
1991	In Sydney Today	Guest	TV series, 1 episode
1991	Celebrity Family Feud	Celebrity contestant (with Paula Duncan)	TV series, 1 episode
1993	The Big Breakfast	Guest (with 'E Street' cast: Diane Craig & Andrew Williams)	TV series, 1 episode
1993	Ernie and Denise	Guest	TV series, 1 episode
1994	At Home	Guest	TV series, 1 episode
1994–99	Good Morning Australia	Regular guest	TV series, 16 episodes
1996	This Is Your Life: Paula Duncan	Guest	TV series, 1 episode
1996	Sale of the Century	Celebrity contestant	TV series, 1 episode
1996	40 Years of TV Stars... Then and Now	Herself	TV special
1997	Monday to Friday	Guest	TV series, 1 episode
1997	Where Are They Now?	Guest	TV series, 1 episode
1998	Midday with Kerri-Anne	Guest	TV series, 1 episode
1998	What's Cooking	Guest	TV series, 1 episode
2002	The Best of Aussie Cop Shows	Herself	TV special
2002	New Idea: 100 Fabulous Years	Herself	TV special
2007	Where Are They Now	Guest (with 'Cop Shop' cast: Paula Duncan, John Orcsik, Lynda Stoner, Terence Donovan & Gil Tucker)	TV series, 1 episode

== Theatre ==
Year	Title	Role	Notes
1970	When We Are Married		Phillip Theatre, Sydney
1970	Alice in Wonderland		Phillip Theatre, Sydney
1981	The Shifting Heart	Maria Fowler	Marian Street Theatre, Sydney
1991	Run for Your Wife		Glen Street Theatre, Sydney with Theatre of Comedy
1993	Hot Taps		Riverside Theatres Parramatta with Parramatta Theatre Company
1994	Caravan		Sydney Opera House
