= The Unisexers =

- Title card used in the pilot.
- Genre: Drama; Soap opera
- Country of origin: Australia
- Original language: English
- No. of seasons: 1
- No. of episodes: 15

Production
- Running time: 1 hour pilot, 15 -30 minute episodes
- Production company: Cash Harmon Productions

Original release
- Network: Nine Network
- Release: 9 February – 28 February 1975

The Unisexers is an Australian television soap opera made by the Cash Harmon Television production company, best known for creating the soap opera Number 96. A notable failure, it ran for three weeks on Nine Network in 1975.

== Synopsis ==
The Unisexers focused on a group of young people - both male and female - living together in a commune arrangement in the old house of a retired elderly couple whose children had left home. The youngsters set up a business making denim jeans to be worn by both sexes, hence the title of "Unisexers".

== Cast ==
- Walter Pym as Angus Melody
- Jessica Noad as Dora Melody
- Delore Whiteman as Mrs Tripp
- Tina Bursill as Felicity
- Michele Fawdon as Monica Parry
- Josephine Knur as Sally Pickles
- Tony Sheldon as Benjy Lewis
- Steven Tandy as Julian 'Tinsel' Tinsley
- Patrick Ward as Cornelius 'Corny' Hastings
- John Paramor as Eustace
- Anne Grigg as Deirdre
- Sonia Hoffmann as Brigitte
- Scott Lambert as Brian Parry
- Hugh Logan as Humphrey 'Humph' Brown
- Brian Moll
- Toni Lamond as Mrs Lewis

== Tenure ==
The series, hampered by an early evening time slot, failed to find an audience and was cancelled and removed from the television schedules after three weeks. In total a one-hour premiere pilot episode and fifteen thirty-minute episodes were broadcast.

== Reception ==
At the time of its launch, The Unisexers was not well received by critics. John Pinkney of the Melbourne Age described it as 'one of the three worst programme experiences this kindly, patient critic has undergone... the series seems to have received no more than five minute's rehearsal - and that before the script arrived... the teleplay's youths and matrons appear almost universally incapable of behaving like commonplace people.' Allan Glover, in the Sydney Sunday paper the Sun-Herald said: 'The story line is not strong, the climaxes are weak and the actors for the most part fail to impress.'

The week following the show's cancellation, producer Bill Harmon blamed its demise on the restraints of the 6pm timeslot, which prevented it from referring to issues in a realistic manner. He told the Age 'Green Guide' that 'The kids didn't like it because they thought the show was talking down to them... we couldn't do anything on the drug scene, on unwed mothers, and drunk scenes were definitely out.'

25 years after the show was screened, Robert Fidgeon of the Melbourne Herald Sun called The Unisexers one of 'Australia's All-time Top 50 TV Turkeys', and stated it was a 'Dopey soapie about a commune running a jeans-making business from a rundown house. Tina Bursill, Michele Fawdon, Steven Tandy and Tony Sheldon starred.' Fidgeon noted the show was 'Axed after three weeks.'
