= Johnny Lockwood =

English-Australian actor

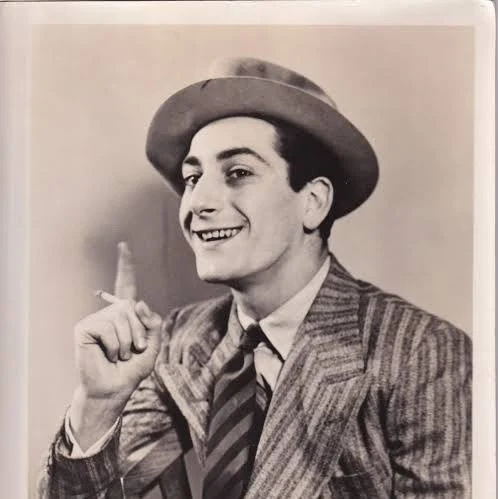
- Lockwood publicity picture
- Born: John Sidney Lockwood; 7 December 1920; West Ham, Essex, England
- Died: 25 April 2013 (aged 92); Coffs Harbour, New South Wales, Australia
- Occupations: Actor; variety entertainer; comedian
- Years active: 1935–2003
- Spouse: Anne Lockwood 1947-1976, remarried 1980- unknown
- Children: Joanna Lockwood

John Sidney Lockwood (7 December 1920 – 25 April 2013) known as Johnny Lockwood, was a British variety entertainer, comedian and actor, who also became notable in Australia after emigrating to that country.

In his native England, he was a variety performer on the West End circuit, primarily as a stand-up-comedian, but also as a singer and dancer. He was invited to serve at a Royal Command Performance in 1949.

== Biography ==
Lockwood was born in West Ham, Essex (now East London) and worked in radio, theatre, television and film. After his huge success in England, he emigrated to Australia, where he became well known for his role in the satirical television comedy The Mavis Bramston Show and the Australian television soap opera Number 96 playing bumbling Hungarian Jewish deli proprietor Aldo Godolfus from 1972 until 1975, a central cast member opposite Philippa Baker who would play his future wife Roma and naive rebellious teenage daughter Rose (played by Vivienne Garrett).

The comedy of much of the duo of "Aldo and Roma" stemmed from both being European immigrants (Aldo from Hungary, And Roma from Russia), who had trouble understanding the local language.

Although Aldo was essentially a comedy character, prior to Number 96, Lockwood had not performed in straight drama and was primarily a stand-up comic.

He had a small role in film Moulin Rouge! and several other features.

=== Early life and military service ===
Lockwood was born as one of four children to William and Annie Lockwood, he had always wanted to perform on stage. His father died when he was 9 in 1929 and his mother died in 1933, hence he was orphaned at age 12, and at 14 applied for a job as a dancer in a touring show.

He continued to develop his talents and by 18 was performing as a variety entertainer after given a contract by impresario Jack Hylton as a comedian. He was a member of the charitable entertainment fraternity, the Grand Order of Water Rats.

His entertainment career was briefly put on hold, as World War II intervened and Lockwood joined the Royal Air Force in 1942 whilst continuing to perform with ENSA,

=== British variety circuit ===
Lockwood was primarily a West End performer, who after being honourably discharged from military service in 1944 after returned to showbusiness, working in variety entertainment, pantomime.

In 1949 he was invited to perform in a Royal Command Performance at the London Coliseum. During the performance he famously tripped and fell, suffering a bloody nose. His quip to the audience was "Well, they told me you wanted blood tonight" which was widely reported by the press.

=== Television and film ===
Lockwood came to Australia originally in 1957 for a ten-week run with the Tivoli Theatre circuit, however he proved so popular with audiences that he has given a 5 year contract and remained in Australia and also appeared in a stage production opposite Bobby Limb. He was then invited back to his native UK to play the role of Fagin in a theatre production of Lionel Bart's Oliver! at the New Theatre, but after which he then returned back to Australia where he settled permanently.

Lockwood spent a year with television series Sunnyside Up, went to the US to perform in Las Vegas, and returned to Australia for a two-year run with classic TV comedy series The Mavis Bramston Show, and then played the lead role in Canterbury Tales.

The role in Number 96 followed in 1972. Lockwood was an original cast member of the series; his character was specifically devised by writer David Sale (who also wrote for Bramston), as bumbling delicatessen proprietor Aldo Godolfus. Aldo was originally conceived as a Greek emigrant, but the character was later changed to a Hungarian Jew to suit the actor's dialect; in the storyarc his character escaped the Hungarian Revolution of 1956, arriving in Australia with his daughter Rose. He wed former restauranteur and later his deli employee Roma Lubinsky (Philippa Baker) and the duo were developed as comedy characters, who became highly recognised figures in the serial. Aldo and Roma were famously and later regretfully killed off in a dramatic revamp of the series – during "the infamous bomb blast storyline" – in September 1975.

During the 1980s and 1990s, Lockwood made guest appearances in Australian drama series and soap operas. In 1985, he appeared in soap opera Neighbours as Daphne Lawrence's grandfather, Harry Henderson. He guest starred in two 1991 episodes of soap opera E Street. During this period he also acted in feature films.

He had a short theatre run in a Queensland production in the early 1980s portraying Tevye in Fiddler on the Roof.

In the early 2000s Lockwood continued to make television and film guest appearances including roles in Moulin Rouge! and miniseries The Potato Factory. He also continued stage work with the Sydney Theatre Company.

== Personal life ==
Anne Lockwood, Johnny Lockwood's wife since 1947, died in Sydney in 1976. After Johnny had gone to bed one evening she died after suffering a heart attack and falling from the balcony of their high-rise apartment at McMahon's Point. Some people speculated that she had committed suicide, something Johnny angrily denied.

Lockwood married again in 1980. His daughter Joanna Lockwood, born in Hammersmith, London, England, is an actress, best known for her long-running role in television serial Cop Shop; she also appeared briefly in Number 96.

Lockwood died on 25 April 2013 at a nursing home in Coffs Harbour, aged 92.

== Filmography ==
=== Film ===
Year	Title	Role	Type
1968	Anything Goes		
1969	The Life and Times of Reverent Shotte		
1972	Duffer	Hippie Guitarist	
1974	Number 96	Aldo Godolfus	
1977	All at Sea	Rev Parslow / George Parsons	TV film
1982	Norman Loves Rose	Sam	Feature film
1984	Stanley (aka Stanley: Every Home Should Have One)	Flasher	Feature film
2001	Moulin Rouge!	Character Rake	Feature film
2003	The Rage in Placid Lake	Barber	Feature film

=== Television ===
Year	Title	Role	Type
	Sunnyside Up		TV series
1967-68	The Mavis Bramston Show	Various characters	TV series
1971	Spyforce	Ruben Nathan	TV series
1972-75	Number 96	Aldo Godolfus	TV series
1973	The Evil Touch		TV series
1975	The Norman Gunston Show	Checkout Chicks	TV series
1978	Tickled Pink	Rabbi	TV special
1981	Bellamy	Len Payne	TV series
1982	Kingswood Country	Tony Bertolucci	TV series
1985-86	Neighbours	Harry Henderson	TV series
1987	A Country Practice	Mickey O'Rourke	TV series
1991	E Street	Johnny Little	TV series, 2 episodes
2000	The Potato Factory	Moses	TV miniseries
2002	Short Cuts	Hippy	TV series
2003	Pizza	Insurance	TV series
