= Carlotta (performer) =

Australian entertainer (born 1943)

Carlotta AM
- Born: 2 September 1943 (age 83); Balmain, New South Wales, Australia
- Other names: Carol Byron, Carole Spencer, Carole Lea
- Occupations: Cabaret performer; television personality; actress; singer; author
- Years active: 1959–present
- Known for: Les Girls (stage revue)
- Television: Number 96; The Naked Bunyip; Beauty and the Beast; Studio 10

Carlotta AM (born 2 September 1943) is the stage name of Carol Byron, also known as Carol Spencer and credited briefly on television as Carole Lea, a transgender Australian cabaret performer and television personality.

Carlotta began her professional career in 1959 as a Brigitte Bardot-like performer, as an original cast member of the long-running Sydney-based male revue Les Girls (pronounced lay-girls) cabaret show, which had an international following, in Sydney's Kings Cross. Carlotta performed spot-numbers as a singer and comedian, and eventually became the show's compere and lead attraction.

Although best known as a cabaret performer, in 1974 Carlotta appeared briefly on the television series Number 96 as Miss Robyn Ross, in a comedic story line that saw her coming out as transgender to the surprise of her boyfriend Arnold (Jeff Kevin). Her appearance on the show marked the first time worldwide that a transgender character was portrayed by a transgender actor.

As a TV presenter, Carlotta was a featured panelist on the talk show Beauty and the Beast, as well as a regular guest on the entertainment program Studio 10.

In 2021, Carlotta announced her retirement from the industry after 62 years. In response, the Sydney Morning Herald cited Carlotta as an Australian legend in the vein of Don Bradman and Cate Blanchett.

== Biography ==
=== Early life and personal life ===
Carlotta was born in Balmain, New South Wales on 2 September 1943, to mother Evelyn Byron, who worked for the Australian Arm of the International Red Cross, and an unknown father.

As a child, she was taught song-and-dance routines by her mother. Neither her mother nor her stepfather approved of her subsequent transgender performing career, and she found solace in a woman she affectionately called "Aunty Hazel". She had sex reassignment surgery in 1971.

In 2024, she lived in Surfers Paradise, Queensland.

== Career ==
=== Les Girls cabaret ===
Carlotta's stage name was sourced from that of Empress Carlota of Mexico. Managed by impresario Lee Gordon, who had organised tours to Australia by Elizabeth Taylor, Frank Sinatra and Judy Garland, she began her career as an original cast member of the long-running stage male revue Les Girls (pronounced lay-girls) cabaret show, which started in 1962 in the purpose-built nightclub building owned by Abe Saffron in the heart of Sydney's Kings Cross. The revue was performed exclusively by males in drag costume, and Carlotta performed spot-numbers as a singer and comedian. She eventually became known as "The Queen of The Cross" as the show's compere and lead attraction, performing also in Leagues clubs while touring with the show.

Carlotta also appeared in the 1970 film The Naked Bunyip.

Les Girls and Carlotta became an attraction for visitors to Sydney. Carlotta departed in 1992. Inspired by the film The Adventures of Priscilla, Queen of the Desert, she mounted a revue, Carlotta & Her Beautiful Boys, planning to tour Australia. This was not a financial success, bankrupting her, after which she mainly appeared as a one-woman performer.

== Television personality ==
Carlotta (credited as "Carolle Lea") appeared in the soap opera Number 96 in 1973 as Robyn Ross, the new girlfriend of Arnold Feather (portrayed by Jeff Kevin). In the story it was soon revealed that Robyn was in fact a transsexual showgirl, a revelation that led to the end of her romance, meaning she left the show. It is the first time anywhere in the world a trans TV character would be played by a trans actress.

From 1997, Carlotta became a regular panellist on the talk show Beauty and the Beast, hosted by Stan Zemanek. Between 2013 and 2018, she made regular appearances as a panel member on morning show Studio 10.

== Biographical telemovie ==
A 90-minute telemovie, Carlotta, was screened in June 2014 with Jessica Marais acting the title role. The film "presents a romanticised perspective that offers only hints of the harsher realities of Byron's complex life."

== Stage shows ==
In 2005, she presented her own half-million-dollar stage production, Carlotta's KingsX, in the Big Top at Luna Park, Sydney, based on her 2003 book I'm Not That Kind of Girl. Produced by Brett Elliott and Richard Bernardo, the 90-minute show consisted of classic storytelling, stand-up comedy, lavish costumes, and "Les Girls" dance performances throughout. She has also toured with her one-woman show Carlotta: Live and Intimate. She toured, performing such songs by Irving Berlin, Rodgers and Hart, Stephen Sondheim and her late friend Peter Allen, performing with a three-piece band headed by Michael Griffiths in 2019.

== Awards and honours ==
Carlotta was awarded the Member of the Order of Australia (AM) on 26 January 2020 for services to the performing arts and the LGBTIQ community. She has also been awarded The Kings Cross Award for services to tourism, the Drag Industry Variety Award, and the Australian Club Entertainment Lifetime Achievement Award. In 2018, a bronze sculpture was dedicated to her in Kings Cross, where she also has a star on the pavement.

== Health ==
In 2018, in an exclusive interview with New Idea, Carlotta stated she was suffering from a urinary tract infection, which subsequently caused bladder cancer, but doctors had discovered it early and were able to successfully surgically remove the tumour.

== Books ==
Carlotta has published two books:

- He Did it her Way: Carlotta, legend of Les Girls (with James Cockington) (1994), Chippendale ISBN 033027483X.
- Carlotta: I'm not that kind of girl (as told to Prue MacSween) (2003), Pan Macmillan: Sydney. ISBN 073291194X.

As of 2013, these biographies and memoirs have been out of print.

Additionally, Carlotta was a featured artist in the 1969 photo book Birds of the Cross.
