= Lynn Foster =

Playwright, radio producer, writer and script editor (1914–1985)

- Born: 1914; Sydney, New South Wales, Australia
- Died: 1985 (aged 71); Mosman, New south Wales, Australia
- Occupations: Playwright; radio producer; radio writer; script editor; television screenwriter
- Years active: 1933-?
- Known for: Big Sister (radio series), Number 96 (TV series)

Lynn Foster (1914–1985) was an Australian playwright, radio producer and writer, a script editor and television screenwriter. She was the first woman in Australia both to direct and write a major national radio show, this being the serial Big Sister.

In 1945, she wrote a play called Lost Generations, to aid in the sale of war bonds, and was given a letter of thanks from Prime Minister Ben Chifley.

== Biography ==
Foster was born in Sydney, Australia, in 1914. She wanted to become a playwright. When she was nineteen Foster won second prize in a competition which led to a job offer with the radio station 2UE in Sydney. Slowly she began to develop through short pieces for their channel until 1936 when she was writing scripts for the Broadcasting Service Association with a team that became known as the Macquarie Players in 1938. Foster preferred to work for herself and wrote for many different patrons. Her career progressed through adapting radio scripts from America until 1942 when she became the director of Big Sister. The show held top ratings of the daytime programs during its five-year run and starred Thelma Scott, and Nigel Lovell. When it finished Foster directed Crossroads of Life.

She added a role for a friend, actor Peter Finch. He used his pay to cover the fare to London where his career bloomed. In 1949 Foster followed him and stayed in London, working in radio and television there for twenty years. She returned to Sydney in 1970 and worked on the television show Number 96.

Grace Gibson from Texas formed Grace Gibson Productions in 1944 and hired Foster to be the company's first director. The following year Foster wrote Lost Generation and went on to become the representative commercial radio writers who were working to be able to transfer to Actors Equity which has developed into the Writers Guild.

She moved to London in 1949.

During her time in the United Kingdom she wrote The Exiles, described as a cycle of four plays and set in Australia between 1873 and the then present day.

Foster died in Mosman, Sydney, in 1985, aged 71.

== Select Credits ==
- When the Wind Blows (1957) - writer
- The Exiles (1959) - writer
- Coronation Street - writer
- Divorce Court (1967–68) - writer
- The Unloved (1969) - producer
- Number 96 - writer, script editor
- Matlock Police - writer, script editor
