= Philippa Baker (actress) =

Australian actress (1932–2026)

- Born: Philippa Hickie; 20 November 1932; Sydney, New South Wales, Australia
- Died: 26 September 2026 (aged 93); Chatswood, New South Wales
- Other name: Edna
- Occupation: Actress
- Years active: 1953–1989
- Known for: Number 96 (TV series and film) as Roma Lubinski Godulfus
- Notable work: Blue Hills (radio serial); The Norman Gunston Show (guest recurring role)

Philippa Baker (née Hickie; 20 November 1932 – 26 September 2026) was an Australian actress of radio, theatre and television.

Baker was one of the earliest performers on Australian radio, alongside stars Queenie Ashton, Ethel Lang, Gwen Plumb and her Number 96 future co-star Thelma Scott.

She was associated with the "Golden Age of Australian Radio" and appeared in Radio drama, including spending five years appearing in the long-running Gwen Meredith radio series Blue Hills playing Scottish nurse Heather. At the time of that series demise;, prior to the British radio series The Archers, Blue Hills was the world's longest-running radio soap, running for some 27 years and was a spin-off to the earlier Meredith radio production The Lawsons. Baker also appeared in a 19-month stint in the radio series Dr. Paul.

She started her career in theatre in 1953, and moved to the new medium of television continuing in the theatre tradition appearing in live televised plays, debuting in A Rose Without a Thorn in 1958, before moving to guest parts in Crawford Productions TV serials.

She is best known for featuring in the soap opera Number 96 in the early 1970s as a comedy duo with Johnny Lockwood as Russian deli worker Roma Lubinski. She later marries his character Aldo, but due to the series' falling ratings, both characters were subsequently killed off in a bomb blast storyline. Baker and Lockwood also featured in the film version in 1974.

Baker played Dame Enid Lyons in the 1988 miniseries True Believers.

After Number 96 she had several small roles in telefilms and miniseries, and even appeared in the popular 1988 Yahoo Serious feature film, Young Einstein, in a cameo as Sigmund Freud's mother. In 1989, after 35 years of performing, Baker retired from acting.

== Early life and education ==
Baker was born as Philippa Hickie in Sydney on 1932, and attended the Independent Theatre, training under Doris Fitton.

== Career ==
=== Radio ===
Baker acted in the long-running radio serial Blue Hills, spending five years playing Scottish nurse Heather from 1953 to 1958.

=== Television and film ===
Baker as Roma Godulfus in TV series Number 96

Baker appeared in television plays by the Australian Broadcasting Corporation from 1958 onwards, and then featured in a few different roles in early Crawford Productions police procedurals Homicide and Division Four.

She however became best known for playing Roma Lubinski in top-rated soap opera Number 96. She joined the series early in the show's run in 1972, becoming a popular comedy double-act with Johnny Lockwood, who played her character's soon-to-be husband Aldo, the deli proprietor. It is revealed in later storylines that Roma is a Jewish woman from Russia, who during the war was held in a concentration camp and fled Europe to settle in Australia, and become a restauranteur, she works in the deli as Aldo assistant before they form a romantic liaison.

Aldo and Roma reprised their roles in the 1974 feature film version of Number 96. They were written out of the serial in late 1974 with all the attached publicity, but returned several weeks later: it was always planned as a temporary absence and the media stories were a publicity stunt.

By August 1975 however, the program's ratings had entered a slump and a drastic revamp of the show was planned. The writers decided to write out several high-profile characters, so in early September 1975 the show's famous bomb blast killed four residents including Roma and Aldo. The couple were extremely popular and there was much campaigning by fans to bring back their favourite characters. In 1976 Baker and co-star Lockwood appeared in a retrospective documentary special, titled ...And They Said It Wouldn't Last, commemorating the 1000th episode of Number 96.

In 1976 Baker joined comedy series The Norman Gunston Show in a recurring sketch The Checkout Chicks, a parody of melodramatic soap operas set in a supermarket. The Checkout Chicks featured other former Number 96 actors Abigail, Vivienne Garrett, Candy Raymond, Judy Lynne and Anne Louise Lambert.

In 1977, she appeared in the guest role of Mrs. Jamieson (Dennis Jamieson's mother) in the soap opera The Young Doctors.

Through the 1980s Baker made various appearances in theatre, television and film. She had small roles in the films Annie's Coming Out (1984) and Young Einstein (1988).

=== Theatre ===
Baker started her early career in theatre at the time she was working as a head librarian when she was offered an arts council tour with the Twelfth Night Theatre , she worked in theatre between 1953 and 1989, including productions of Medea, The Glass Menagerie, The Cherry Orchard, Hedda Gabler and A Streetcar Named Desire

=== Death and personal life ===
Baker died on 26 September 2026, in Chatswood, New South Wales at the age of 93. Her husband Phillip Hickie had predeceased her, she had 2 daughter's Amanda and Caitlin and 2 grandchildren.

== Filmography ==
=== Film ===
Year	Title	Role	
1958	A Rose Without a Thorn	Tiley	TV movie
1962	Funnel Web	Marion Westlake	TV movie
1962	Family Album	Harriet Winter	TV movie
1964	A Sound of Trumpets		TV Movie
1970	"Eden House" (an episode of series Australian Plays)	Helen	TV movie
1974	Number 96	Roma Godolfus	Feature film
1976	Murcheson Creek		TV movie
1977	Say You Want Me		TV movie
1981	A Hard God	Monica	TV movie
1984	Annie's Coming Out (aka A Test of Love)	Sister Waterman	Feature film
1988	Young Einstein	Freud's mother	Feature film

=== Television ===
Year	Title	Role	Type
1963	The Hungry Ones		TV mini-series
1968	Contrabandits	Prudence	TV series
1971	The Godfathers	Molly	TV series
1970–71	Division 4	2 roles: Mrs Couter; Helen McGuire	TV series
1970–72	Homicide	3 roles: Mrs Allen; Mrs Campbell; Mrs Johnson	TV series
1972–75	Number 96	Mrs. Roma Lubinski/Godolfus	TV series
1975	The Norman Gunston Show	Member of "Check-out Chicks" (soap opera parody)	TV series
1976	Number 96 ...And They Said It Wouldn't Last	Herself	TV special celebrating 1000th episode of Number 96
1977	Pig in a Poke		TV miniseries, episode: Christine's Story
1977	The Young Doctors	Mrs. Jamison	TV series, 5 episodes
1981	Australian Theatre Festival	Monica	TV series
1981	The Weekly's War	Mrs. Cruickshank	TV miniseries
1984	Five Mile Creek	Mrs. Curtis	TV series
1988	The Dirtwater Dynasty	Landlady	TV miniseries
1988	True Believers	Dame Enid Lyons	TV miniseries

== Theatre ==
Year	Title	Role	Playwright
1953	Le Bourgeois Gentilhomme		Jean Baptiste Moliere
1954	Cockpit		Bridget Boland
1954	Before the Carnivale		Peter Kenna
1955/1956	Medea		Euripides
1956	The Glass Menagerie		Tennessee Williams
1956	The Beautiful People		William Saroyan
1959	The Slaughter of St. Teresea's Day	Sister Mary Mark	Peter Kenna
1963	The Cherry Orchard		Anton Chekhov
1966	Three Sisters		Anton Chekhov
1976	The Wolf	Countess	Ferenc Molnar
1976	Saturday, Suunday, Monday		Eduardo de Filippo
1977	Wild Oats (play)		John O'Keeffe
1980	The Bread-Winner (play)	Dorothy	William Somerset Maugham
1981	The Shifting Heart	Momma Bianchi	Richard Beynon
1983	Mornings at Seven		Peter Osborn
1983	In Duty Bound		Ron Elisha
1984	A Hard God		Peter Kenna
1986	Hedda Gabler		Henrik Ibsen
1988	A Streetcar Named Desire		Tennessee Williams
1989	A Family Affair (play)		Alexander Ostrovsky
1989	The Barretts of Wimpole Street		Rudolf Besier

== Radio ==
Year	Title	Role	Type
1950s	Blue Hills	Scottish nurse	Radio serial
