= Johnny Whyte =

English screenwriter

- Born: England, United Kingdom
- Died: 1985
- Occupation(s): Screenwriter, executive television producer
- Known for: Coronation Street, The Mavis Bramston Show, Number 96

Johnny Whyte (died 1985) was an English-born television screenwriter, who was considered a specialist in drama, best known for working on soap opera Coronation Street, having immigrated to Australia, he served as a script editor, as well as an executive producer on The Mavis Bramston Show and Australian soap opera Number 96.

== Selected credits ==
- Coronation Street (1961–62)
- The Des O'Connor Show (1963)
- The Dickie Henderson Show (1964) – writer
- A Home of Your Own (1964)
- Number 96 – script editor, writer, executive producer
- The Unisexers (1975) – writer, development
- Arcade (1980) – script editor
- The Mavis Bramston Show - Executive Producer
