= Number 96 (TV series) =

1972 Australian TV series

- Title card from a 1975 episode of Number 96 while airing on TV1
- Genre: Soap opera
- Created by: David Sale
- Written by: David Sale; Johnny Whyte; Lynn Foster; Ken Shadie; Eleanor Witcombe
- Ending theme: "Paper Boy"
- Composer: Steve Gray
- Country of origin: Australia
- Original language: English
- No. of seasons: 6
- No. of episodes: 1,218

Production
- Executive producers: Don Cash & Bill Harmon
- Production locations: Network 0–10 Lane Cove and Woollahra
- Running time: 30 minutes per episode (five nights a week)/2x 1 hour episodes per week
- Production company: Cash Harmon Television

Original release
- Network: The 0–10 Network
- Release: 13 March 1972 – 11 August 1977

Number 96 is an Australian primetime soap opera that aired on 0-10 Network (the forerunner of what is now Network Ten) and was produced by Cash Harmon Television and created by David Sale, who also served as a scriptwriter, primarily alongside Johnny Whyte broadcast from 13 March 1972 to 11 August 1977, originally in the primetime slot of 8:30 pm for 5 x half-hour episodes every weeknight, then later 2 x one hour episodes screened per week.

The series follows the lives of the residents and visitors of a fictional four story inner Sydney block of flats located at 96 Lindsay Street, Paddington (hence the title "96")

Although the series gained a huge following in Australia, because of its risque and controversial content and subject matter for its time, it never attained the worldwide global success or cult following as later show Prisoner that was known as Prisoner: Cell Block H in the UK and USA.

The show was originally broadcast in black and white monochrome until halfway through its run; starting in March 1975, it was seen in colour, after networks in Australia switched over to colour television broadcasting.

== History and background ==
Number 96 was notable for breaking new ground and introducing controversial and taboo subject matter to Australian television, at the time not seen anywhere in the world, including the United Kingdom or United States.

The launch of the series was heavily promoted in media with full-page newspaper advertisements in a daily countdown to the launch lamponing "Tonight, Australian television loses its virginity". A launch party was also held with cast and crew with media personnel in attendance.

The show was produced by Cash Harmon Television and was conceived by David Sale, a British novelist and former EP of The Mavis Bramston Show, who also was a screenwriter on the series. The series was originally commissioned by the then flagging 0-10 network which was in "a make or break situation" to boost ratings that were lagging behind the well-established rivals Nine Network and Seven Network, to make a soap opera with similar elements to the British series Coronation Street, "but a little racier".

The show was a daring last-bid attempt from a network struggling on the verge of bankruptcy, and its immediate success (and advertising revenue) helped the network become more competitive by buying successful new international shows such as The Waltons and M*A*S*H. By 1974, the network was number one in the ratings for the first time in its history.

Number 96 became one of the most popular Australian drama television series of all time, but due to its racy subject matter, it was not picked up by many international markets. It was the first soap opera to screen in prime time five nights a week, and later became the first Australian TV series to inspire a brief US remake.

Number 96 became infamous for its groundbreaking depictions of controversial and taboo subjects of the time, exploring issues such as homosexuality, abortion, rape, interracial romance, drug usage, pregnancy in later life, and transgenderism, but also included an array of comedy characters with their own catchphrases, in a nod to vaudeville.

The highest rated episode was the one in which it was revealed that Lucy Sutcliffe's (portrayed by Elisabeth Kirkby) lump in her breast was benign.

== Multicultural milestones ==
=== British cast and characters ===
Number 96 was based during an era of mass immigration to Australia, primarily from the UK and Europe, and as befitting its inner-city location, presented a much more multicultural view of suburbia.

Popular British-born actors included future Neighbours star Tom Oliver as Jack Sellers and original cast member and the series' sex symbol Abigail as Bev Houghton.

One of the most popular original characters was played by English comedy performer Johnny Lockwood, who played bumbling Hungarian Jewish deli owner Aldo Godulfus. Lockwood was most known as a variety entertainer, and although Aldo was conceived as a comedy character, it was Lockwood's first major dramatic role in a soap opera.

British actors portraying British characters included originals Elisabeth Kirkby and James Elliot, who played Lucy and Alf Sutcliffe, who hailed from Lancashire. Series writer David Sale stated he based the characters on his own parents from England, and even named Lucy after his own mum, but whereas his own parents had emigrated to Australia and loved the country, he depicted Alf as the archetypal whinging pom who longed to go back to his native England.

Actor Joe James was another English-born actor who joined as Dr. Gordon Vansard, who worked at the chemist with his sister, later revealed to be his wife Sonia (played by Lynn Rainbow

Carol Raye played Don Finlayson's aunt, Amanda von Papenburg, who was a British Baroness who resided in Germany and arrived to visit Don on several occasions.

In later years and having previously played Les Whittaker, Scottish-born Gordon McDougall returned to the series playing the role of Les's Scottish aristocrat brother, Lord Andrew McCraddenow. Les's wife was played by English-born Sheila Kennelly, however, she played the barmaid Norma as an Australian, evidenced by her famous "G'day Ducky" catchphrase.

=== European and other cast ===
Fashion designer Vera Collins hailed from South Africa; coincidentally enough, her portrayer, Elaine Lee, was also born in South Africa.

Bettina Welch was born in New Zealand and Arinanthe Galani was also born in New Zealand of Greek descent, but played fiery Italian Maria Panucci. Her Italian nephew who worked in the deli was portrayed by Harry Michaels, also of Greek Descent.

Australian actress Philippa Baker played Russian-born deli assistant Roma Lubinski, who was soon to be Aldo's wife.

Shorter-term characters included German-born Josephine Knur as waitress Lorelei Wilkinson and Karen Petersen as Italian jewel thief Christine Vettare.

African American characters included dancer Ronne Arnold as Chad Farrell and comedienne Chelsea Brown as Hope Jackson,.

Aboriginal hairdresser Rhonda Jackson was played by Justine Saunders, and there was an Indian medic, Dr. Bannerjee.

== LGBTQ milestones and TV world firsts ==
Number 96 was the first television program anywhere in the world to feature a full diverse range of LGBTQ characters as regulars, and show a same-sex kiss between two men. Many historians and scholars are unaware of this, because the show's controversial content meant it was unable to be screened outside of Australia.

There had been LGBTQ characters in other TV programs before but these were primarily one-off guest characters or fleeting mentions. Often, these characters would be portrayed as being weak and effeminate, and be victims or criminals

Actor Joe Hasham appeared for the entire duration of the series as lawyer Don Finlayson. Hence, Number 96 was the first series to depict a gay character in a regular role and the first to be portrayed as a sympathetic character and in a positive light. Hasham's Finlayson gained a cult following and been acknowledged as doing much for gay-lib. Don was depicted as being dependable, sincere and kind, yet he was not effeminate and came across as straight acting, though he had no hang-ups about being gay. Don would have several gay relationships in the series (and a few one-night stands) and never had relationships with women.

Don's first lover in early episodes was bisexual photographer Bruce Taylor (portrayed by Paul Weingott). Taylor was TV's first bisexual character, whilst with Don he would have an affair with ruthless businesswoman Maggie Cameron. After Bruce fled, Don formed a more long-term and enduring relationship with hilariously camp bisexual chef Dudley "Dud" Butterfield. Don and Dudley remained living together for two years and only separated when Dudley decided to become a ladies man, in sequences made primarily for comedic effect.

In the early episodes, Don and Bruce were not allowed any physical contact with each other, as directed by a nervous network. As the years rolled on, Don and Dudley were allowed to occasionally touch other, and seen getting into bed with each other.

Towards the end of the series, Don passionately kissed his partner Rob (portrayed by John McTernan), making it the first male gay kiss on a TV drama anywhere in the world. Just before the series ended, Don was seen in bed with Joshua (portrayed by Shane Porteous). Both were naked and Don was smoking a cigarette, clearly after sex.

According to the publication The Great Clowns of American Television, comedian Ernie Kovacs was the first person to portray a gay character Percy Dovetonsils in his self-titled The Ernie Kovacs Show, although the term was not officially established at that time. The first regular gay character in the US occurred several months after Number 96 in 1972. Actor Vincent Schiavelli played Peter Panama in sitcom The Corner Bar, but he was short-lived; however, unlike Number 96′s Joe Hasham, his portrayal did not prove popular with viewers and he only appeared for the first season, with then-president of the New York-based Gay Activists Alliance calling it "the worst stereotype of a gay person I've ever seen".

Number 96 would also feature numerous firsts, however usually featuring shorter term cast in varying story-arcs, for example notable theatre star Toni Lamond, played Karen Winters, who was TV's first ever lesbian character. She was shown fondling and kissing the virginal Bev (played by series regular Abigail) whilst she was sleeping under the effect of sleeping pills. Karen was later revealed to be a devil worshipper who wanted to sacrifice Bev to the devil during a Black Mass, a story-arc that was heavily censored.

A second lesbian character, Marie Crowther (played by Hazel Phillips), left the series after ogling Vera Collins in the shower and being told her affections would not be returned.

The series also featured TV's first ever transgender character, and remarkably she was played by a transgender actress, cabaret performer Carlotta. Robyn Ross was romanced by Arnold Feather (Jeff Kevin), a comic character whose early romances always ended in disaster. Although the relationship did not last, she was never dehumanised or poked fun at.

== Broadcasting and production ==
Bill Harmon and Don Cash had previously worked in New York at NBC, and became a partnership after arriving in Australia and producing adventure series The Rovers and a couple of unsuccessful films.

Production of Number 96 started in October 1971. It was produced and recorded on videotape in monochrome for the first three years, and switched to colour production in late 1974. Many of the early black-and-white episodes no longer exist.

Producer Don Cash used one of the world's first computers to figure out how the series could construct such a large output.

The premise, original story outlines, and original characters were devised by series creator David Sale, who had also written for the TV comedy satire series The Mavis Bramston Show. Sale also wrote the scripts for the first episodes of Number 96 and continued as a script writer and storyliner for much of the show's run.

A building at 83 Moncur Street, Woollahra, was used for exterior establishing shots of the block of flats. The majority of the recording was done on sets at the studios of Channel Ten based then in North Ryde, Sydney.

Directors included Peter Benardos and Brian Phillis. Regular writers included David Sale, Johnny Whyte, who was the series' final script editor, Susan Swinford, Dick Barry, Michael Laurence and Lynn Foster.

Early black-and-white episode featuring semiregular Thelma Scott as Claire Houghton and her on-screen daughter Bev Houghton, played by Abigail

Number 96 became infamous for its groundbreaking adult storylines and nudity, its comedy characters, and controversial storylines including teenage drug addiction and a black mass conducted by devil-worshippers. Whodunits included a panty snatcher (dubbed the Knicker Snipper), the Pantyhose Strangler, the Hooded Rapist, and a bomb that exploded killing off four characters.

A story where Rose Godolfus (Vivienne Garrett) took marijuana was the first time the Australian Broadcasting Control Board exercised the 101 censorship code, insisting that Rose must be shown to suffer from its effects. However, a few years later, at the request of NSW Police, a heroin drug storyline was explored with 15-year-old schoolgirl Debbie Chester (Dina Mann). She was seen being taught how to inject heroin with a needle, in a storyline designed to warn parents how easy it was.

The first shock moment in the show's premiere involved heavily pregnant Helen Eastwood (Briony Behets) and her husband Mark (Martin Harris). He tried to seduce her by putting his hand up her dress, and when she refused, he began to look elsewhere. Helen returned home to discover Mark in their bed with Rose Godolfus Vivienne Garrett. She was seen topless, the first actress in Australia to do such a nude scene. However, after the episode screened in Sydney, the Broadcasting Control Board ordered both of these moments to be heavily censored and this cut version is all that remains today.

Over the next few weeks, Rose was gang-raped by bikies, Vera was raped by her husband Harry Collins, Bev was assaulted for not sleeping with a suitor, and Gordon Vansard (Joe James) was revealed to have been a doctor struck off the books for doing illegal abortions.

An interracial kiss between character Chad Farrell, played by Ronne Arnold, and Sonia (Lynn Rainbow), was said to have made the show unable to be sold to the U.S. International networks could cut out the nudity, but the interracial romances and homosexual themes were too frequent to be censored.

A later interracial romance saw Indigenous actress Justine Saunders playing hairdresser Rhonda Jackson. She had an affair with Dudley (Chard Hayward) but was secretly in love with Arnold (Jeff Kevin) and the actress became the first Aboriginal woman to appear on the cover of TV Week while publicising this role.

The final year of Number 96 featured the reintroduction of sexual situations with more nudity, and increasingly violent situations. Carol Raye, who played Amanda and stayed on behind the scenes to do casting, left the show and creator David Sale also quit in its final months.

Don and Dudley had split; Don's new boyfriend was schizophrenic Rob Forsyth (John McTernan) and then corrupt cult leader Joshua (Shane Porteous). The show's final months saw Dudley being graphically machine-gunned to death in the Wine Bar (now a disco called Duddles), and a neo-Nazi bikie gang ran amok in a violent storyline that upset some real-life bikers.

As ratings fell, the boldest move in the show's final months was showing full frontal nudity with the arrival of Miss Hemingway, a delusional psychiatric patient who didn't like wearing clothes. The move, however, attracted just three complaints, despite being screened on free to air TV at 8:30 pm.

Other bedroom farce sequences featured male and female nudity. A scene where Jane Chester becomes a prostitute and is asked to whip her male client, new Number 96 resident Toby Buxton (Malcolm Thompson), featured a brief glimpse of his full frontal male nudity.

Another world first in its dying months was the first use of a four letter word in a TV drama, when Grant Chandler asked if anyone found the word "shit" offensive.

These changes were made to combat falling viewing figures, but it didn't work and in April 1977 the series was cancelled due to declining ratings. Pat McDonald, Ron Shand and Joe Hasham were the only original cast members to remain to the final episode.

Left to right: Bunney Brooke, Dina Mann, Sheila Kennelly, Frances Hargreaves, and Pat McDonald, who was immensely popular as malapropping gossip Dorrie Evans.

== Cast ==
=== Main / regular ===
| Actor | Character | Year(s) | Episodes |
|---|---|---|---|
| Pat McDonald | Dorrie Evans | 1972-1977 | 1–1218 |
| Ron Shand | Herb Evans | 1072-1977 | 1-1218 |
| Joe Hasham | Don Finlayson | 1972-1977 | 1–1218 |
| Elaine Lee | Vera Collins; later Sutton | 1972-1976 | 1–1082 |
| Elisabeth Kirkby | Lucy Sutcliffe | 1972-1975 | 1–886 |
| James Elliott | Alf Sutcliffe | 1972-1975 | 1–886 |
| Johnny Lockwood | Aldo Godolfus | 1972-75 | 1–839 |
| Vivienne Garrett | Rose Godolfus Myers | 1972, 75 | 1–146, 841–845 |
| Abigail | Bev Houghton (Abigail also played Eve) | 1972–73 | 1–319 |
| Victoria Raymond | Bev Houghton (Abigail also played Eve) | 1973 | 320–445 |
| Robyn Gurney | Janie Somers | 1972 | 1–141 |
| Briony Behets | Helen Eastwood | 1972 | 1-55 |
| Martin Harris | Mark Eastwood | 1972 | 1-55 |
| Paul Weingott | Bruce Taylor | 1972-74 | 1-25, 418–453 |
| Bettina Welch | Maggie Cameron | 1972-76 | 7–956 |
| Norman Yemm | Harry Collins | 1972-74 | 9-39, 288–453 |
| Lynn Rainbow | Sonia Freeman | 1972-73 | 12-260 |
| Joe James | Dr. Gordon Vansard | 1972 | 14-201 |
| Mike Ferguson | Gary Whittaker | 1972-77 | 20-534, 842–1122 |
| Philippa Baker | Roma Lubinski Godolfus | 1972-75 | 30-839 |
| Thelma Scott | Mrs. Claire Houghton | 1972-77 | 35–1185 |
| Tom Oliver | Jack Sellars | 1972-75 | 49-845 |
| Gordon McDougall | Les Whittaker | 1972-75 | 74-839 |
| Gordon McDougall | Andrew Whittaker, the Lord McCraddenow | 1976-77 | 1070-1123 |
| Sheila Kennelly | Norma Whittaker | 1972-77 | 74–1216 |
| Susannah Piggott | Georgina Carter | 1972 | 87–156 |
| Jeff Kevin | Arnold Feather | 1972–77 | 98–1218 |
| Jeff Kevin | Charles "Chook" Feather | 1976–77 | 938–1167 |
| Bunney Brooke | Florence "Flo" Patterson | 1972-77 | 152–1218 |
| Candy Raymond | Jill Sheridan | 1973 | 274–418 |
| Carmen Duncan | Helen Sheridan Sellars | 1973 | 274–406 |
| Jill Forster | Helen Sheridan Sellars | 1973–74 | 410–590 |
| Carol Raye | Baroness Amanda von Pappenburg | 1973–75 | 385–694 |
| Carol Raye | Claudine | 1974 | 619, 624 |
| Chard Hayward | Dudley Butterfield | 1973-77 | 401–1182 |
| Mike Dorsey | Councillor Reginald P. "Daddy" McDonald | 1974-77 | 447–1218 |
| Wendy Blacklock | Edith (Edie) "Mummy" MacDonald | 1974-77 | 447–1218 |
| Frances Hargreaves | Marilyn MacDonald | 1974-77 | 447–1218 |
| Pamela Garrick | Patti Olsen Feather | 1974, 76 | 481–669, 1014 |
| Jan Adele | Trixie O'Toole | 1974-76 | 527–1098 |
| Josephine Knur | Lorelei Wilkinson | 1974 | 557–649 |
| Peter Adams | Andy Marshall | 1974-75 | 591–753 |
| Chantal Contouri | Tracey Wilson | 1974-75 | 632–680 |
| Peter Flett | Michael Bartlett | 1974–75 | 641–693 |
| Paula Duncan | Carol Finlayson | 1974-75 | 656–760 |
| Scott Lambert | Miles Cooper | 1975 | 753–839 |
| Margaret Laurence | Liz Chalmers Feather | 1975-76 | 781–921 |
| Vince Martin | David Palmer | 1975 | 800–904 |
| Pamela Gibbons | Grace "Prim" Primrose | 1975-76 | 800–917 |
| Kit Taylor | Warwick Thompson | 1975-76 | 808–993 |
| Anya Saleky | Jaja Gibson | 1975-76 | 830–1029 |
| Mary Ann Severne | Laura Trent Whittaker | 1974-77 | 867–1122 |
| Dina Mann | Debbie Chester | 1975-77 | 869–1216 |
| Patti Crocker | Eileen Chester | 1975-76 | 871–957 |
| Suzanne Church | Jane Chester | 1975-77 | 881–1216 |
| Roger Ward | Frank "Weppo" Smith | 1975-76 | 883–1039 |
| Curt Jansen | Herbert "Junior" Winthrop | 1976 | 912–1018 |
| Peter Whitford | Guy Sutton | 1976 | 919–993 |
| Harry Michaels | Giovanni Lenzi | 1976-77 | 931–1218 |
| Joseph Furst | Carlo Lenzi | 1976 | 934–1029 |
| Lynne Murphy | Faye Chandler | 1976-77 | 990–1195 |
| Michael Howard | Grant Chandler | 1976-77 | 999–1213 |
| Stephen McDonald | Lee Chandler | 1976-77 | 999–1216 |
| Arianthe Galani | Maria Panucci | 1976-77 | 1083–1210 |
| John McTernan | Rob Forsyth | 1977 | 1101–1161 |
| Les Foxcroft | Sir William Mainwaring | 1976-77 | 1008–1130 |
| Dave Allenby | Dr. Harold Wilkinson | 1977 | 1131–1204 |
| Nat Nixon | Opal Wilkinson | 1977 | 1137–1218 |
| Deborah Gray | Miss Hemingway | 1977 | 1148–1200 |

=== Other ===
Numerous stars wanted to appear in roles, even horse racing trainer Gai Waterhouse, who unsuccessfully auditioned after completing a drama course in England. Also suggested was a young Bryan Brown (although having been in England, he had acquired a British accent, and was considered unsuitable by producer Bill Harmon, even though he hailed from Parramatta).

=== Visit by nobility ===
The Duke and Duchess of Bedford visited the set and appeared in a cameo in the series, in a storyline in which they come to visit Baroness Amanda Ashton / von Pappenburg (played by Carol Raye).

== Series background ==
Early cast member Bettina Welch as Maggie Cameron

The series became famous for every episode ending in a cliffhanger and it was the first to do a summer cliffhanger, where the cliffhangers would be ramped up with every character in peril over the six-week break the show took for the summer hiatus. In 1972, it was the car crash of Gordon (Joe James) and in 1973, Bev (Victoria Raymond) was shot. In 1974, Patti (Pamela Garrick) was the shock second victim of the Pantyhose Strangler, but in 1975, instead of a death, it was the mysterious resurrection of Jaja (Anya Saleky) who was thought to be dead. For its last summer cliffhanger, a drunk Herb (Ron Shand) was seen leaving Sydney on a train with a mystery blonde out to rob him.

During 1974, the series shifted its emphasis from sexual situations and drama to focus more on comedy. After the introduction of colour TV in 1975, ratings went into decline as its audience began switching over to bigger budget American shows (that year the show was only the third highest-rated show of the year, behind The Six Million Dollar Man and repeats of Bewitched). A bold new storyline was devised to revitalise the series and in an unprecedented move, 40 complete scripts were discarded and rewritten. The Number 96 set was sealed off to non-essential personnel with a new storyline involving a mysterious figure planting bombs, with several false alarms. The dramatic storyline was intended to draw back viewers and to provide a mechanism to quickly write out several existing characters in a bid to freshen up the cast of characters and revamp the storylines. On the episode aired Friday 5 September 1975, a planted bomb exploded in the delicatessen, destroying it and the adjacent wine bar, which was crowded with customers. The sequence was filmed on a Saturday because the studio was empty, and real gelignite was used, resulting in the studio doors being blown off their hinges.

The makers of the show made a bold move, killing off several long-running cast favourites, which were revealed on the front page of newspapers on Monday 8 September 1975. They included Les (Gordon McDougall), Aldo and Roma Godolfus (Johnny Lockwood and Philippa Baker), and then revealing scheming Maggie Cameron (Bettina Welch) as the bomber and sending her off to prison. Maggie wanted to scare residents into moving so she could sell the building. Despite massive publicity, the bomb-blast storyline resulted in only a temporary boost to the program's ratings, but it did provide material for future storylines, particularly with the trial of Maggie Cameron.

Gordon McDougall as Les Whittaker

In October, Lucy and Alf Sutcliffe (played by original cast members Elisabeth Kirkby and James Elliott) were also written out of the series. New younger characters were added to the show, most of whom didn't last out the series. Two that did were teenage sisters Debbie and Jane Chester (Dina Mann and Suzanne Church). They became orphans when their parents were killed by a shark, in an obvious nod to the film Jaws. Other enduring characters among the high cast turnover of the later period were new blonde sex symbol Jaja Gibson (Anya Saleky), and Giovanni Lenzi (Harry Michaels), an exuberant Italian who worked in the deli.

1976 saw another whodunnit storyline with the Hooded Rapist, and there was now an increase in location shooting, including Moncur Street, Woollahra (outside the building used in the credits), local parks, Chinatown, and Luna Park.

=== Series format ===
The first episode began with an exterior shot of the building with moving vans being unloaded while Herb and Dorrie are heard having an argument. Each subsequent episode began with an exterior shot of the building while audio from the previous episode's final scene could be heard. The shot would zoom in on the apartment in which that scene occurred, or remain unchanged, as the show's title was displayed. The vision would then switch to the scene in question as a recap of the previous episode's cliffhanger.

The series was broadcast as five half-hour episodes each week for its first four years. From the beginning of 1976 episodes were broadcast as two one-hour episodes each week in most areas. However, from an internal perspective episodes continued to be written and compiled in half-hour instalments.

=== Film adaptation ===
Number 96 was adapted into a feature film in 1974 and titled Number 96. The feature film opened with Vera being gang-raped by bikies just before the opening titles. When asked why he chose to start the movie like this, (David Sale) quipped "I wanted people to know they were in the right cinema."

One of the film's major drawcards was being a full-colour production, unlike the series which was still broadcasting in monochrome. It had the same creative team and mostly the same cast as the series. Although it received mostly negative reviews, audiences lined up George Street to gain a seat on opening day. It earned nearly A$2.8 million on a A$100,000 budget, and was the most profitable Australian movie ever made at that time. It became the 5th highest grossing Australian movie of the 1970s. Film critics, unfamiliar with the TV series, were amazed that each character received a round of applause from the audience when they made their first appearance.

=== Final night ===
The final episode ended with a reunion curtain call of popular cast members past and present. A week after the airing of the final episode in Sydney, a televised public auction of props and costumes from the series was held in the grounds of Channel Ten.

== Cultural impact and reception ==
Number 96 was rated number 9 in the 2005 television special 50 Years 50 Shows, which counted down Australia's greatest television programs.

McKenzie Wark wrote in Celebrities, Culture and Cyberspace (published by Pluto Press, 1999): "Once, when I was a kid, I was walking down a suburban street at night, when I noticed a rhythmic flickering of light from inside the houses. Though screened from view by the drawn curtains, the lights from a row of separate houses were all pulsing in time, and then I heard the music and I knew everyone was watching the same show ... Number 96."

John Singleton wrote: "When Shakespeare was writing his plays, people queued up for Shakespeare. Today, they're queuing up for Number 96, so in my opinion Number 96 is today's Shakespeare."

Phillip Adams, from newspaper The Age, wrote: "I believe that television serials provide a surrogate sense of community and that many viewers are more involved in Number 96 than they are in their own community."

The series was featured in cinema documentary Not Quite Hollywood (2008). Interviewees included Number 96 actors Rebecca Gilling, Wendy Hughes, Lynette Curran, Briony Behets, Candy Raymond, Roger Ward, and Norman Yemm, and an associate producer of Number 96 and The Unisexers, David Hannay.

=== Cult status ===
Number 96 was the first Australian soap opera/serial to gain a significant cult following, prior to the network's internationally successful series Prisoner. It led to huge merchandise such as tie-in novels and magazines, singles and LP records from cast members, a disco soundtrack album, a Family Circle cookbook with an iron-on T-shirt transfer, the 1974 feature film Number 96, and a 1980 American remake.

When the series started. its cast was one of the largest ever assembled for a local production. When it ended after 1218 episodes, it was the longest-running soap opera produced in Australia, having surpassed the ABC series Bellbird. Number 96 was surpassed by The Young Doctors in 1982.

At the series' height, The New York Times stated it was the highest-rated program of its kind in the world.

When the stars travelled from Sydney to Melbourne via train overnight to attend the Logie Awards ceremony, they were mobbed at country stations along the way during wild whistle stops. The crowds waiting in Melbourne was bigger than those that met The Beatles during their only Australian tour in 1964.

Whilst the program was extremely popular in Australia, its risqué subject matter and storylines meant it sold into very few overseas markets. The show was written up in Time magazine, but it could never have screened in the United States, because of its nudity, homosexuality, and interracial romances.

It included veteran actors from Australia, mainly from the early days of radio and stage. As theatre had been their preferred form of entertainment, many stars, such as Wendy Blacklock, were reluctant to go into a TV serial, but once she got there, she remained until the final episode.

The series, although originally based on elements of Coronation Street, which screened twice a week, was later likened more to US serial Peyton Place, which at its peak had three half-hour episodes a week. Neither show could match the Australian show's prestigious output of five half-hour episodes a week, and screening all year except for a six-week break over summer.

=== Controversies ===
The show attracted many complaints. The Australian Broadcasting Control Board repeatedly sanctioned the network. To keep the series on air, each episode was previewed to ensure it complied with control board guidelines. Sometimes, offending scenes were cut from the episode after its Sydney airing and were not seen when episode screened elsewhere. Consequently, the first episodes feature cuts and screen blackouts. Paperwork about the offensive material, which includes most of the Black Mass, survives with the National Film and Sound Archive, but the actual reel of footage has never been found. Eventually, due to the show's popularity, the control board relaxed its restrictions and stopped previewing episodes. By the time the show was winding up in 1977, nobody seemed to be checking its output, which was far racier than anything that had been dared in its early years when it was under constant surveillance.

In Daily argued "In later years, the stories and characters apparently became broader and less grounded, going for gags and shock factor rather than verisimilitude, with too many plots inspired by old Hollywood movies and a desire to be “back door pilots” for a spin-off series, rather than something true and relevant."

=== Awards ===
In addition to the four Logies won by cast member Pat McDonald during her run with the show, Number 96 won both the "Raw Prawn" award in 1976 for Worst Drama, and "Best Drama" Logies in 1974, 1975, and 1976. Actor Bunney Brooke won the "Best Actress" Logie Award for her work as Flo in 1975.

The series cast became stars in Australia and had their own Number 96 passenger train, specially designed for cast and crew travel, which for the show's first few years they would take the train from Sydney to Melbourne for the annual TV Week Logie Awards in a silver multicarriaged train with the commissioner's carriage hooked up at the rear for VIPs. This train was specially organised by publicity director Tom Greer. The 16-hour overnight journey left from the centre of Sydney at 4:30 pm with a farewell party, complete with red carpet and jazz band in attendance; it featured whistle stops at country sidings and saw thousands of people turn out to see their favourite stars, before it arrived at Spencer Street station. These whistle stops were all beamed back by television stations and went live to air. The rail service of the time was keen to promote its overnight tourism packages, and for the journey, the train was christened as the Spirit of 96.

A humorous story, as told by Greer, was the engagement of a piano player (the outrageous John McDonald) to entertain the cast on the train on the way to Melbourne. John could only play upright pianos. The railways rang and said they could not get the upright around the passageway corners of the train so it would be impossible to get it on board. Greer demanded it be put on the train somehow even if it meant dismantling the piano and putting it back together – "key by key". In desperation, engineers arrived and took off the side of the carriage, loaded the piano on with a forklift, before replacing the carriage wall. The train used green steam locomotive number 3801, which frequently operated the Spirit of Progress train service between Sydney and Melbourne.

=== Merchandise ===
Eight paperback novelisations (1972–74) were sold under the Arkon imprint by Angus & Robertson. Some of these were credited to "Marina Campbell", a pseudonym of Anne Harrax. An original novel, 96 (Cover title: Number 96), was published by Stag in 1976.

In 1975, the Number 96 Cookbook was released in Australia by publisher Pacific Magazines (Family Circle)]; it featured photographs and recipes from eight members of the cast.

The series celebrated 1,000 episodes in 1976 with a compilation special, Number 96: And They Said It Wouldn't Last, which reviewed the show's most famous story lines and recounted the exploits of its departed main characters. And They Said It Wouldn't Last was repeated at the start of 1977 with a new ending presented by Dina Mann. It is featured on the first DVD release, along with a new documentary that covered the show's final 200 episodes.

=== International screenings ===
Cast members were amazed to learn the show briefly screened overseas. Cast member Bettina Welch reported seeing it dubbed in Italy, but this was never confirmed. Despite a short late-night run in Toronto, Canada, on edgy network Citytv, the content was too explicit for any US and UK television network. An attempt to sell the show at Cannes TV Festival in 1975 by using a topless model backfired when British newspaper Daily Mirror reported it got "a swift 'No Entry' sign" from their broadcasters the BBC and ATV."

Mike Dorsey and Wendy Blacklock as Reg and Edie McDonald (Mummy and daddy)

=== American version ===
In 1980, a short-lived US remake of the same name on NBC retained the comedy, but toned down the sexual elements of the series. The series was launched over three consecutive nights, from 10 to 12 December. US television and TV Guide promotions for the series used advertising hyperbole, suggesting that the series had been "banned in Australia". The nudity and racy content of the original series were not present in the remake; it probably would not have been allowed in the US due to censorship standards there, so the US version only hinted at the sexual content that had been on display in the original. The US version of Number 96 was quickly cancelled due to low ratings. The US show was finally aired in parts of Australia in 1986.

== Episodes ==
| Season | Episodes | Originally released | |
| Season | Episodes | First released | Last released |
|---|---|---|---|
| 1972 | 1–201 | 13 March 1972 | 15 December 1972 |
| 1973 | 202–445 | 8 January 1973 | 14 December 1973 |
| 1974 | 446–669 | 28 January 1974 | 15 December 1974 |
| Film | | 5 May 1974 | |
| 1975 | 670–910 | 13 January 1975 | 12 December 1975 |
| 1976 | 911–1098 | 19 January 1976 | 7 December 1976 |
| 1977 | 1099–1218 | 18 January 1977 | 11 August 1977 |

== Availability ==
From 4 February 1980, TEN-10 in Sydney commenced repeating the series at midnight Mondays through Thursdays, starting from episode 585, the first episode fully produced in colour. In 1994, Network Ten repeated the 1976 special And They Said It Wouldn't Last with a new introduction by Abigail.

In November 1996, Network Ten screened a re-run of Number 96: The Movie.

Though the complete run of colour episodes (585–1218) survive, the National Film and Sound Archive retains only 19 of the first 584 black-and-white episodes. The rest were lost when the show switched to colour, with the master tapes wiped by the network for re-use, or made into a "foyer display". The first three weeks (episodes 1–15), episodes 31–35 and two episodes from the 1974 black and white series (episodes 450 and 534) survive. With the exception of episodes 11, 12, 14, 15 and 534, all available black-and-white episodes have been released on DVD, along with Number 96: The Movie and the 1974 and 1975 episodes 649–712, 832–847. As of March 2022, 96 of 1218 episodes have been released in some form, with 560 episodes presumed lost.

== DVD Collections ==
Number 96: The Collectors Edition was released in a 2-disc set on Region 4 on DVD by Umbrella Entertainment. The 2-disc includes the full 1974 feature film version.

Umbrella subsequently released three volumes of episodes across 4 discs each. Number 96: The Movie was also included the compilation Ozploitation: Volume 4 with five other Australian exploitation films.

| Release | No. of episodes | Region 4 (Australia) | Includes |
|---|---|---|---|
| Number 96: Collectors Edition | | 10 July 2006 | Number 96: The Movie (1974); Audio commentary presented by TV critic Andrew Mercado, with series creator David Sale and cast member Elaine Lee who played Vera Collins; Original draft screenplay (DVD-ROM); And They Said It Wouldn't Last, a 1976 documentary special celebrating the show's 1000th episode, with an introduction by Abigail from 1994; The Final Years, a 2006 documentary covering the last 218 episodes, with interviews with Elaine Lee (Vera), Sheila Kennelly (Norma Whittaker) and Wendy Blacklock (Edie McDonald), David Sale and Andrew Mercado; Archive footage of the cast's Spirit of 96 train journey from Sydney to Melbourne to attended the 1975 Logies. |
| Number 96: The Pantyhose Strangler | 32 | 30 August 2008 | Episodes 649–680 (which originally broadcast from 8 November 1974 to 27 January 1975); Audio commentary presented by TV critic Andrew Mercado with Chantal Contouri who played Tracy Wilson AKA the Infamous Pantyhose Strangler; Archive footage of the announcement of the 2006 DVD release aired on Network Ten Ten News; stills gallery |
| Number 96: Aftermath of Murder | 32 | 13 March 2010 | Episodes 681–712 (which originally broadcast from 28 January 1974 to 12 March 1975); Audio commentary by Andrew Mercado with Elisabeth Kirkby who played Lucy Sutcliffe and Carol Raye who played Baroness Amanda von Pappenburg; The Australian Way: A Salute to Aussie Sex Appeal, a 1982 television special hosted by Good Morning Australia's host Gordon Elliott and actress Joanna Lockwood in a clip segment that features Abigail as a special guest.; 1976 "Adults Only" television promo for documentary And They Said It Wouldn't Last; Archival Christmas from cast messages from 1975; Archive footage of the announcement of the 2008 DVD release aired on Network Ten News, includes reunion between Chantal Contouri and Pamela Garrick (Patti Feather Olsen) |
| Number 96: The Beginning and the Bomb | 32 | 13 March 2012 | Episodes 1–10, 13, 31, 33–35 (which originally broadcast between 13 March 1974 to 27 April 1972); Episode 450 (Feb 1, 1974); Episodes 832–847 (27 August to 16 September 1975); Audio interviews by author and TV historian Nigel Giles with James Elliott (Alf Sutcliffe) and director Peter Benardos; Audio commentary by The Honourable Michael Kirby and Andrew Mercado; 2009 interview by Andrew Mercado with Elaine Lee (Vera) and David Sale; 2009 interview by journalist Angela Bishop with Elisabeth Kirkby who played Lucy Sutcliffe; Downloadable PDFs of original press clippings and advertisements |

== Streaming media ==
Number 96 to be broadcast on streaming media, recognising its place in the history of Australian television.

On 22 April 2025, it was announced that the series will be broadcast on Umbrella Entertainment's ad-supported streaming platform Brollie. All 35 surviving black and white episodes were available from 16 May 2025, with a special bridging episode explaining the major storylines to bring viewers up to date with the second half of the show, with five colour episodes to be dropped each Friday night from 30 May.

Monday March 2, 2026 sees the return of the Number 96 TV series to Australian TV screens through Aussie Classics channel 414 on Binge and Foxtel. Series continues weekdays 2pm and weeknights replayed from 10pm.

== Streaming online ==
| Collection | Episodes | Year |
|---|---|---|
| Number 96 Season 1972 (The Black and white Episodes) | Trailer; plus Episode 1–15, Episode 31 - Episode 35 | 1972 |
| Number 96 Bridgeing Episode | 50-minute special episode keeping fans up to date with events occurring from Episode 35 to Episode 585 (these original master tapes were wiped by the network, with these episodes no longer surviving) | Hosted by Andrew Mercado (recorded 2025) |
| Number 96: Collection 2 (1974) | Episodes 585 - Episode 669 | 1974 |
| Number 96: Collection 3 (1975) | Episodes 670- | 1975 |

== See also ==
- List of Australian television series
- The Box
- Chances (TV series)
