= David Sale =

Australian screenwriter (born 1932)

- Born: Ernest Swindells; 1932 (age 93–94); Manchester, England, United Kingdom
- Occupations: Novelist; screenwriter; producer; playwright; director; actor; journalist
- Notable work: The Mavis Bramston Show, Number 96

David Sale (born 1932) is an English-born author, television screenwriter, playwright, producer, director, actor and journalist. He emigrated to Australia age 18, in 1950, and has contributed to many TV drama series, and provided special material for Australian entertainers.

== Biography ==
=== Early life ===
Sale was born as Ernest Swindells in Manchester, England in 1932 to an aircraft factory worker and his wife Lucy, (he even named the popular Number 96 character of Lucy Sutcliffe, played by Elisabeth Kirkby, after his mother) he grew up in Manchester during the years of World War II, before taking to professional writing under the pseudonym of David Sale.

=== Author ===
Sale travelled to England to release his first two novels Come to Mother in 1971 and The Love Bite in 1972, released by W.H. Allen, they were released in London in hardback, with both being brought to Hollywood, the first of which was made into a television film called Live Again, Die Again

=== Screenwriting ===
Sale was the Executive Producer of the satirical weekly series The Mavis Bramston Show, that was conceived by star Carol Raye, before being asked by the production team Cash Harmon Television to work on the TV soap opera Number 96 which he created, wrote and served as the primary script editor. Both programs where amongst the most famous highly and highly influential programs in the history of Australian television. Sale also wrote the short-lived tV series The Group

=== Publications 1980, 1990s and 2000s ===
Television interrupted this flow of books, but in the 1990s Sale resumed his career as an author with Twisted Echoes (1993) (Hodder Headline); Scorpion's Kiss (1995) (Pan Macmillan) and Hidden Agenda (1996) (Pan Macmillan). A later book is the memoir "Number 96, Mavis Bramston and Me" (Vivid Publishing)) plus an audio version read by the author (Bolinda audio).

=== Theatre ===
He later tackled musical theatre for the first time with his co-written (book and lyrics) version of Sumner Locke Elliott's novel Careful, He Might Hear You.

== Books ==
- Come to Mother (1971) (W. H. Allen Ltd) (ISBN 0-491-00317-X)
- The Love Bite (1972) (W. H. Allen)
- Chiller (1983, "based on The Love Bite") (Sphere) (ISBN 0-7221-7625-2)
- Antidote (1991) (Bantam) (ISBN 1-86359-027-7)
- Twisted Echoes (1993) (Hodder Headline) (ISBN 0-74724083-3)
- Scorpion's Kiss (1995) (Pan Macmillan) (ISBN 0-33027497-X)
- Hidden Agenda (1996) (Pan Macmillan) (ISBN 0-33035737-9)
- Number 96, Mavis Bramston and me (2013) (Vivid Publishing) (ISBN 9781922204080) David Sale
