= List of Australian films of 1970 =

== 1970 ==
Title	Director	Cast	Genre	Notes
Adam's Woman	Philip Leacock	Beau Bridges, Jane Merrow, John Mills, James Booth, Andrew Keir, Tracy Reed, Peter Collingwood, Harold Hopkins, James Booth, Clarissa Kaye, Peter O'Shaughnessy, Katy Wild, Helen Morse	Drama Feature film	IMDb
Beyond Reason	Giorgio Mangiamele	George Dixon, Maggie Copeland, Ray Fellows, Louise Hall, Ollie Vens-Kevics	Action/ Drama/ Thriller	IMDb
Boobs a Lot	Aggy Read		Short / Comedy	IMDb
Color Me Dead	Eddie Davis	Tom Tryon, Carolyn Jones, Rick Jason, Penny Sugg, Sandy Harbutt, Suzy Kendall	Mystery / Thriller Feature film	
Dead Easy				IMDb
Harry Hooton	Arthur Cantrill, Corinne Cantrill		feature film	
Jack and Jill: A Postscript	Phillip Adams, Brian Robinson	Anthony Ward, Judy Leech, Stanley Randall, Jean Higgs, Gerry Humphries	Drama Feature film	
The Journey				IMDb
Little Jungle Boy	Mende Brown	Rahman Rahmann, Mike Dorsey, Michael Pate, Willie Fennell, Noel Ferrier, Niki Huen	Family Feature film	
The Naked Bunyip	John B. Murray	Graeme Blundell, Barry Humphries, Jacki Weaver, Ray Taylor, Barry Jones, Gordon Rumph, Harry M. Miller, Carlotta, Russell Morris, Mark Muggeridge	Comedy Documentary Feature film	IMDb
Ned Kelly	Tony Richardson	Mick Jagger, Mark McManus, Clarissa Kaye, Allen Bickford, Geoff Gilmour, Ken Shorter, Frank Thring, John Dease, Diane Craig, Serge Lazareff, Peter Sumner, Bruce Barry	Drama Feature film	
Nothing Like Experience				IMDb
Old Man and Dog				IMDb
Part One: 806				IMDb
Part Two: The Beginning				IMDb
The Phallic Forest				IMDb
The Set	Frank Brittain	Rod Mullinar, Sean McEuan, Hazel Phillips, Julie Rodgers, Brenda Senders, Roger Ward, Dennis Doonan, Elsa Jacoby	Drama Feature film	IMDb
Squeeze a Flower	Marc Daniels	Walter Chiari, Jack Albertson, Dave Allen, Rowena Wallace, Kirrily Nolan	Comedy Feature film	IMDb
Strange Holiday	Mende Brown	Jaeme Hamilton, Carmen Duncan, Mark Healey, Nigel Lovell, Ben Gabriel, Mark Lee, Van Alexander	Family Feature film	
That Lady from Peking	Eddie Davis	Carl Betz, Nancy Kwan, Bobby Rydell, Sid Melton, Don Reid, Owen Weingott, Sandy Gore	Drama Feature film	aka That Woman From Peking
Three to Go	Brian Hannant; Peter Weir; Oliver Howes	Judy: Judy Morris, Serge Lazareff, Gary Day, Mary Ann Severne; Michael: Matthew Burton, Peter Colville, Betty Lucas, Grahame Bond; Toula: Andrew Pappas, Joe Hasham, John Stanton, Erica Crowne	Drama feature film	IMDb, Segment Michael was AFI winner for Best Film

== See also ==
- 1970 in Australia
