= Two Years' Vacation =

1888 novel by Jules Verne

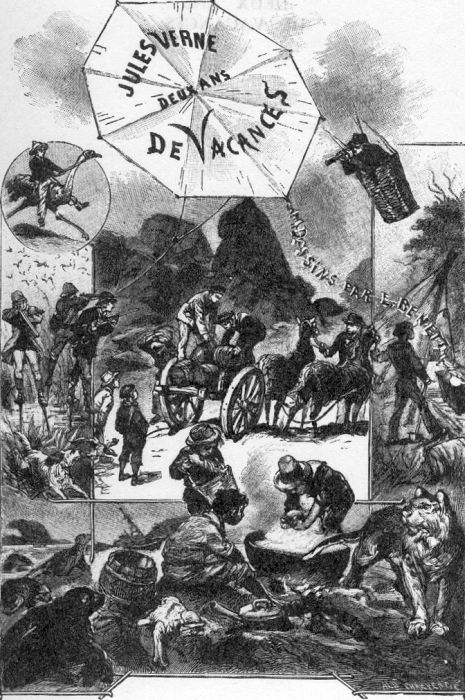
- Author: Jules Verne
- Original title: Deux ans de vacances
- Illustrator: Léon Benett
- Language: French
- Series: The Extraordinary Voyages #32
- Genre: Adventure novel
- Publisher: Pierre-Jules Hetzel
- Publication date: 1888
- Publication place: France
- English publication date: 1889
- Media type: Print (Hardback)
- Preceded by: The Flight to France
- Followed by: Family Without a Name

Two Years' Vacation (French: Deux ans de vacances) is an adventure novel by Jules Verne, published in 1888. The story tells of the fortunes of a group of schoolboys stranded on a deserted island in the South Pacific, and of their struggles to overcome adversity. In his preface to the book, Verne explains that his goals were to create a Robinson Crusoe-like environment for children, and to show the world what the intelligence and bravery of a child were capable of when put to the test.

== Plot summary ==
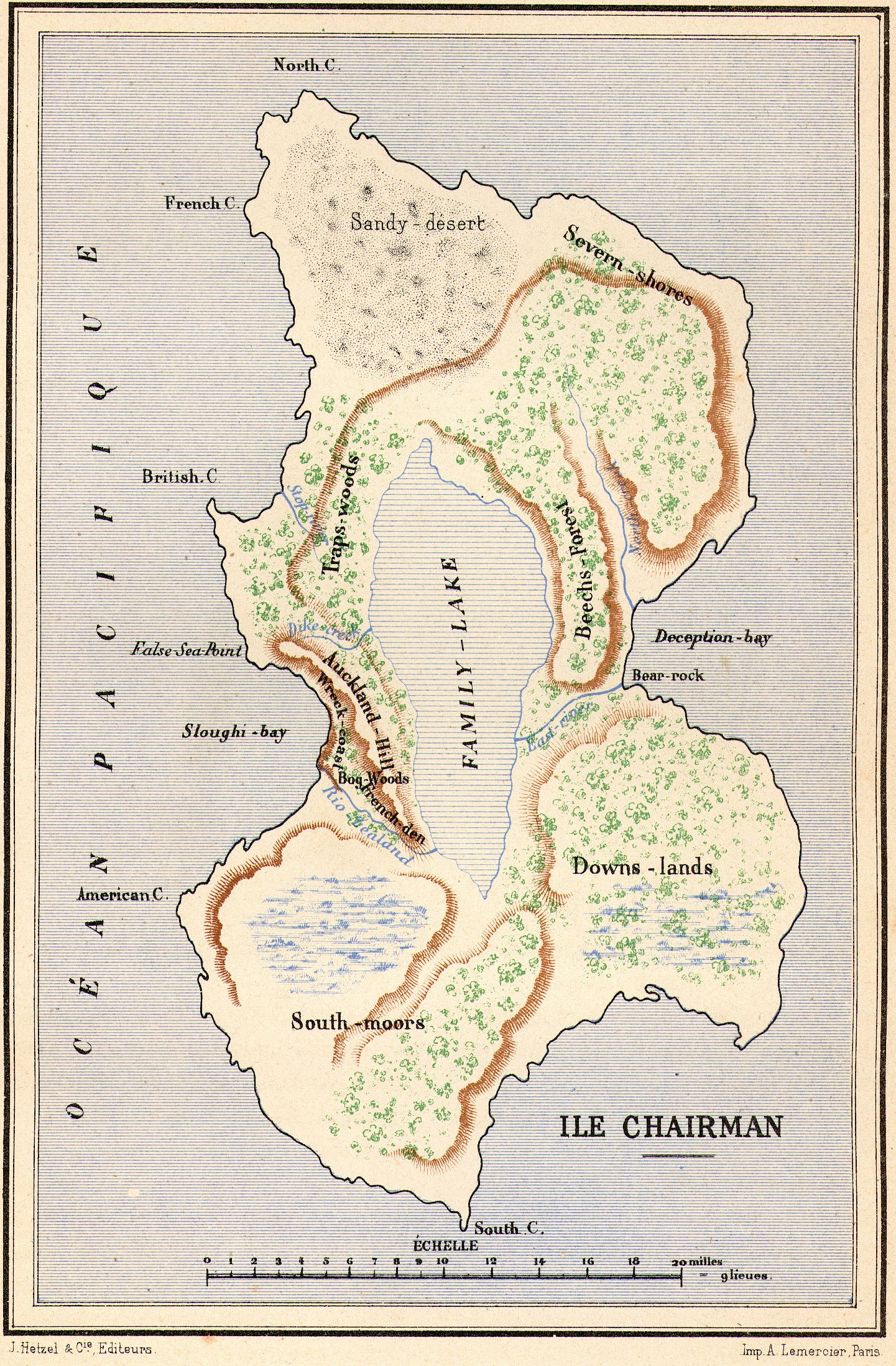
Map of "Chairman Island"

The story opens in March 1860 with a group of schoolboys aged between eight and fourteen on board a 100-ton schooner called the Sleuth moored at Auckland, New Zealand, and preparing to set off on a six-week vacation. With the exception of the oldest boy Gordon, an American, and Briant and Jack, two French brothers, all the boys are British.

While the schooner's crew are ashore, the moorings are cast-off under unknown circumstances and the ship drifts to sea, where it is caught by a storm. Twenty-two days later, the boys find themselves cast upon the shore of an uncharted island, which they name "Chairman Island". They go on many adventures and even catch wild animals while trying to survive. They remain there for the next two years until a passing ship sinks in the close vicinity of the island. The ship had been taken over by mutineers, intent on trafficking slaves. With the aid of two of the surviving members of the original crew, the boys are able to defeat the mutineers and make their escape from the island, which they find out is close to the Chilean coast (Hanover Island, located at 50°56’ S, 74°47’ W).

== Publication ==
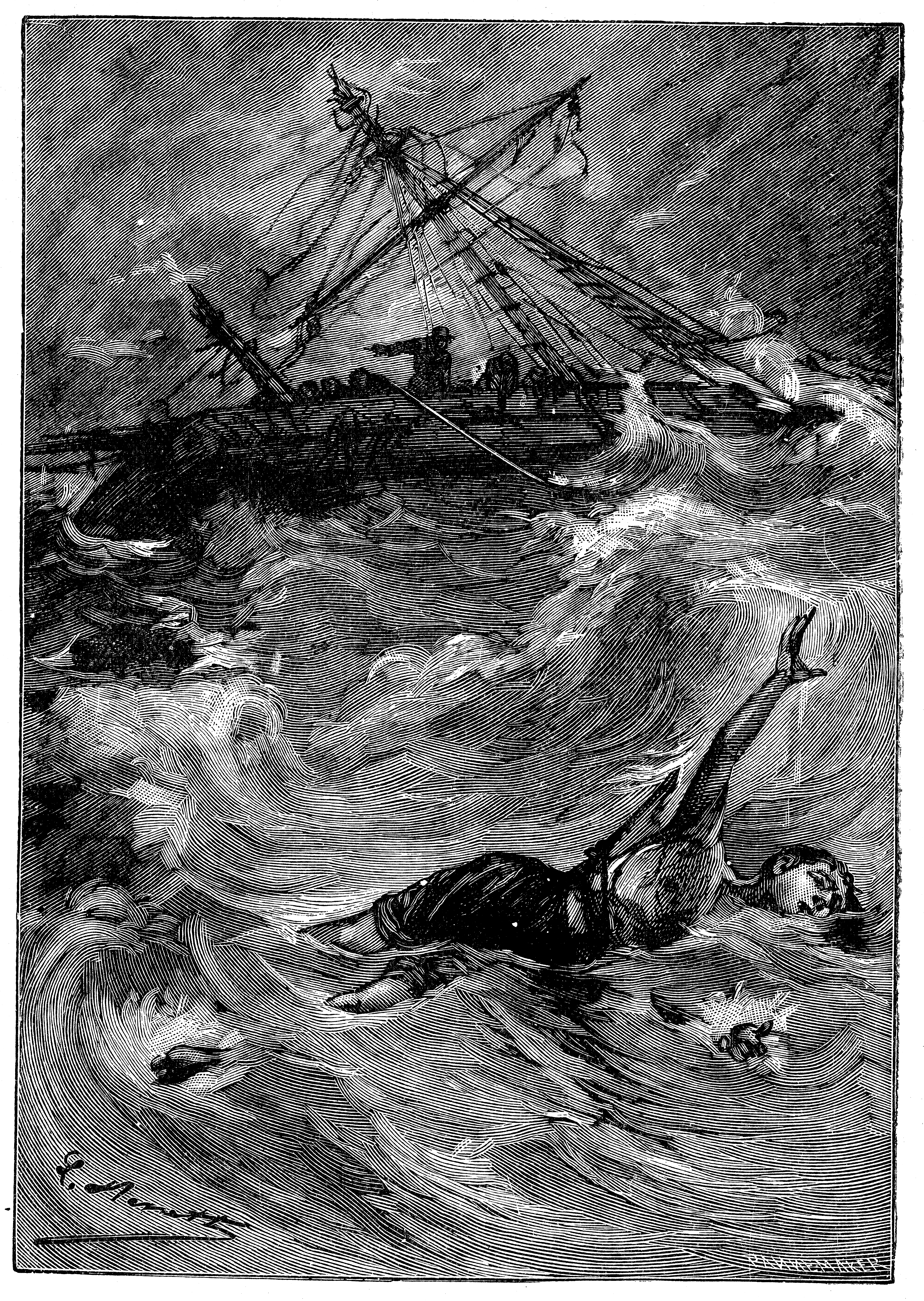
The whirlpool seized him

As with most of Verne's works, it was serialized (in twenty-four parts between January and December 1888) in the "Extraordinary Journeys" section of the French Magasin d’Éducation et de Récréation by the Parisian publisher Hetzel. It was also published in book form in two volumes in June and early November of that year. An illustrated double volume with a color map and a preface by Verne was released in late November.

=== Translations and adaptations ===
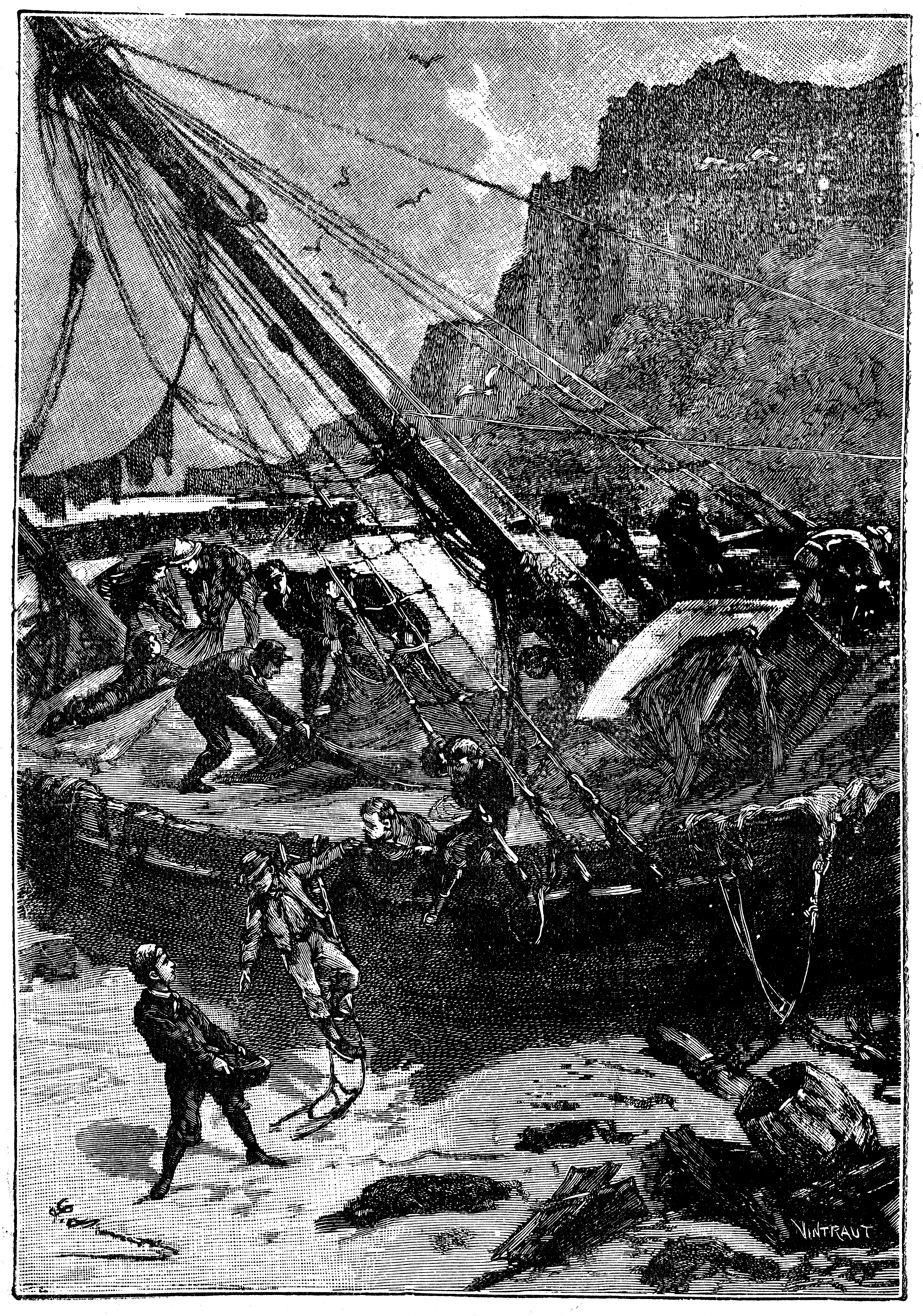
The elder boys began their search (1888)

- An English translation of the book was serialized in 36 installments in the Boy's Own Paper between 1888 and 1889.
- In 1889 a two-volume English-language book titled A Two Year's Vacation was published by Munro in the United States. Later the same year, a single-volume abridged edition in the United Kingdom was released by Sampson Low under the title of Adrift in the Pacific.
- In 1890, from February 22 through March 14, the Boston Daily Globe newspaper serialized Adrift in the Pacific; the Strange Adventures of a Schoolboy Crew.
- In 1896, Morita Shiken translated it to the Japanese language as Jugo shonen (十五少年: it means 15 boys) from the English text.
- In 1962 Emilio Gómez Muriel directed a Spanish-Mexican film Dos años de vacaciones, featuring Pablito Calvo in the main role.
- In 1964 Turkish filmmaker Yilmaz Atadeniz adapted this as a film titled Iki Sene Mektep Tatili.
- In 1965 the I. O. Evans version of the Sampson Low translation was published in England (ARCO) and the U.S. (Associated Publishers) in two volumes: Adrift in the Pacific and Second Year Ashore.
- In 1967 a new modified and abridged translation by Olga Marx with illustrations by Victor Ambrus titled A Long Vacation was published by Oxford University Press in the United Kingdom and Holt, Rinehart & Winston in the United States.
- In 1967 Czech filmmaker Karel Zeman made a live-action/animated film adaptation under the title Ukradená vzducholod ("The Stolen Airship", released worldwide as Two Years' Vacation), loosely based on Jules Verne's novels Two Years' Vacation and The Mysterious Island.
- In 1969 an Australian film produced, directed and written by Mende Brown entitled Strange Holiday credited Jules Verne for the story.
- The 1974 four-part T.V. series Deux ans de vacances was produced in a cooperation of French, Belgian, Swiss, West-German and Romanian television.
- In 1982 a Japanese studio Toei Animation made an anime movie adaptation under the title of Adrift in the Pacific (Japanese: 十五少年漂流記).
- In 1984, The novel was adapted as a Polish comic book titled Dwa lata wakacji (Two Years' Vacation).
- In 1987 a made-for-TV animation was produced by the Japanese studio Nippon Animation under the title of The Story of Fifteen Boys (Japanese: 十五少年漂流記).
- In 2001 the book was redistributed by CLE International to help learners be immersed in French
- The book became the story for different anime series like Kyōryū Bōkenki Jura Tripper, Infinite Ryvius, Mujin Wakusei Survive and Astra Lost in Space. The novel served as the initial inspiration for the Japanese anime series Mobile Suit Gundam in 1979; later in 1983, it would serve again as inspiration for Sunrise's anime series Round Vernian Vifam, as well.

== See also ==
- Lord of the Flies – a novel which echoes the struggles for survival and dominance amongst young boys who are stranded on an island
