= Strange Holiday =

Strange Holiday may refer to:

- Strange Holiday (1945 film), an American film directed by Arch Oboler
- Strange Holiday (1970 film), a 1970 Australian telemovie
