= Tony Alvarez (actor) =

- Born: Tony Alvarez; 19 December 1956; Velez-Malaga, Spain
- Died: 21 July 1997 (aged 40); Sydney, New South Wales, Australia
- Occupations: actor, singer

Tony Alvarez (19 December 1956 – 21 July 1997) was a Spanish Australian actor and singer. Born in Velez-Malaga, he was best known for his television roles in Australia and the US.

== Television in Australia ==
He is probably best remembered for his ongoing role as Dr Tony Garcia in the long running Australian soap opera The Young Doctors. He appeared in the role from 1977 until 1979. His character was a love interest of characters Lisa Brooks (Paula Duncan) and Tania Livingston (Judy McBurney).

== UK stage and music ==
After leaving The Young Doctors Alvarez starred on the stage in Evita and toured the UK with Ronnie Corbett in Cabaret. Alvarez was also a singer, and in the early 1980s he released a cover of Talking in My Sleep.

He had a brief guest role in television serial Prisoner in 1983 playing a man, also named Tony, revealed to be a vicious rapist. He followed this with a six-month stint as a fiery Spanish servant in drama series Carson's Law in 1984.

== US television roles ==
After Carson's Law, Alvarez worked in the US on the series General Hospital and The Bold and the Beautiful.

During Alvarez' career, he worked alongside Antonio Banderas and subsequently discovered they were born in the same town.

== Death ==
Alvarez was diagnosed with an AIDS related cancer and died in Sydney at age 40 not far from the Mitchell Street studios where he first shot to fame in The Young Doctors.
