= Dommett =

Dommett is a surname. Notable people with the surname include:

- Joel Dommett (born 1985), British comedian, television presenter and actor
- John Dommett (1946–2004), Australian actor, writer and director
- Leonard Dommett (1928–2006), Australian violinist, conductor and teacher
- Roy Dommett (1933–2015) British aerospace engineer
