= Jane Fennell =

Australian television presenter

Jane Fennell is a former Australian TV presenter, most notably on the children's television program Mr. Squiggle and Friends. She is the daughter of actor Willie Fennell and grew up in Sydney, Australia.

She initially worked on Mr. Squiggle as a production assistant and was host "Miss Jane" from 1975 to 1986. A car accident left her with serious facial injuries that ended her on-screen career. During her recovery she became close to John Ewart, a long time friend of her father whom she had known since she was 15. They became engaged in 1992 but postponed the wedding following the death of her father. They married on 8 March 1994 in a bedside ceremony, as Ewart lay dying from throat cancer. He died nine hours after the wedding.
