= Lead Me Astray =

- Theatrical film poster
- Directed by: Tom Danger
- Written by: Tom Danger
- Produced by: Tom Danger
- Starring: Jace Pickard; Alannah Robertson; Tim Page
- Cinematography: Tom Danger
- Edited by: Tom Danger
- Music by: Michael Vollebergh
- Production company: Bendy Spoon Productions
- Release date: 24 October 2015
- Running time: 90 minutes
- Country: Australia
- Language: English

Lead Me Astray is a 2015 Australian crime thriller film written and directed by Tom Danger and starring Jace Pickard, Alannah Robertson & Tim Page. This was filmed in Gosford, New South Wales.

== Plot synopsis ==
A young student has a violent past he must confront when that very evil past puts his romantic interest in danger.

== Cast ==
- Jace Pickard as Alexis Willard
  - Addi Craig as Young Alexis
- Alannah Robertson as Lacey Sinclair
- Tim Page as Dr. Gene Seward
- Logan Webster as Alpha
- Paige Hepher as Skull
- Kyren Bateman as Zombie
- Dave Morgan as Barnyard
- Tom Danger as X
- Adib Attie as Y
- Alex Fechine as Z
