= The Cousin from Fiji =

Book by Norman Lindsay

- 1946 edition
- Author: Norman Lindsay
- Language: English
- Genre: Fiction
- Publisher: Angus and Robertson, Sydney
- Publication date: 1945
- Publication place: Australia
- Media type: Print
- Pages: 261 pp
- Preceded by: Age of Consent
- Followed by: Halfway to Anywhere

The Cousin from Fiji (1945) is a novel by Australian writer and artist Norman Lindsay.

== Story outline ==
In the 1890s, 18-year-old Ella Belairs returns home to Ballarat, and her relatives the Domkins, after spending her childhood in Fiji.

== Critical reception ==
The reviewer in The Argus found merit but also some shortcomings: "Each character is a visual image, plus an abstraction. They live in a void; you can't guess where they came from, how they got that way. Those still physically attractive are physical attraction and nothing else. All the others are symbolic grotesques. There isn't, of course, a single adult in the book. In literature, as in drawing, Mr Lindsay's art - beauties, wowsers, pirates, foul fiends, terrifying seniors - is a picture of the reveries of adolescence still in revolt against the taboos of the Victorian age."

In The Sydney Morning Herald, the reviewer found a lot to like about the book: "It is certain that Norman Lindsay will be accused of caricature but he merely exercises the artist's right to select and stress what he needs. This is a quality of imagination. Always the fundamental truth is in his characters, and always he looks at them with a sardonic eye. The underlying note of seriousness and wisdom is likely to be missed by careless readers, because the general tone is buoyant and optimistic and because the novel leaves us with the impression that the world is a pretty good place in which to live."

== 1972 Television adaptation ==
The Cousin from Fiji
- Based on: The Cousin from Fiji by Norman Lindsay
- Written by: Barbara Vernon
- Directed by: Alan Burke
- Country of origin: Australia
- Original language: English
- No. of episodes: 3

Production
- Running time: 60 mins
- Production company: ABC

Original release
- Network: ABC
- Release: September 1972

The novel was adapted for television in 1972. The television mini-series, of three parts, was directed by Alan Burke, from a script by Barbara Vernon, and featured Ruth Cracknell, Penne Hackforth-Jones, Judy McBurney and Patrick Ward. The mini-series was broadcast on the Australian Broadcasting Corporation in September 1972.

It was part of the Norman Lindsay Festival where TV movies adapted from Lindsay works were screened over nine weeks. The first three weeks were devoted to The Cousin from Fiji.

=== Cast ===
- Ruth Cracknell
- Penne Hackforth-Jones
- Judy McBurney as Ella
- Patrick Ward as Gilbert Bunthorp
- Diana Davidson
- Neva Carr Glynn
- Zoe Lake
- Judy McBurney as Ella
- Kevin Wilson as Darky Tryell
- Ric Hutton as Hillary Shadlett

=== Production ===
Burke said the adaptation was "a delight It is funny, sad. marvellously evocative, full of romance and action."

The executive producer was Alan Burke who said:

In 20 years of television I can't think of anything I've enjoyed more... We have followed the novels fairly closely, particularly the illustrations. We have also had a tremendous amount of help and cooperation from both Norman's widow Rose, and his daughter Jane Glad. Jane, who sat alongside him while he was writing The Cousin From Fiji, made available to us a lot of unpublished drawings which we have used as backgrounds to the titles. And the books we have adapted are great fun novels, full of joy, optimism, and hurray. Norman Lindsay had this marvellous capacity to fill his books with beaut, funny characters, real people. There was a tremendous amount of excitement in making the series. .. We had tremendous help all along the way. A tennis firm gave us some old photographs so we could have racquets specially made up. The PMG lent us bicycles for the bike race in the third episode of The Cousin From Fiji. And for a scene in the main street of; Ballarat in 1892_^an entire street in Balmain was closed off from traffic for the day, even buses diverted, so we could film... Adapting the novels has been a happy, exciting experience. And I think Norman himself would be delighted if he were here."

== See also ==
- 1945 in Australian literature
