= On the Run (1982 film) =

- Directed by: Mende Brown
- Written by: Michael Fisher
- Produced by: Mende Brown
- Starring: Rod Taylor; Paul Winfield; Beau Cox; Ray Meagher
- Cinematography: Paul Onorato
- Edited by: Richard Hindley
- Music by: Laurie Lewis
- Release date: August 22, 1982
- Country: Australia
- Language: English

On the Run is a 1982 Australian thriller film.

== Cast ==
- Rod Taylor as Mr Payatta
- Paul Winfield as Harry
- Beau Cox
- Ray Meagher as Joe Thompson
- Danny Adcock as Jingles
- Alastair Duncan as Mr Jabert

== Plot ==
A small boy (Beau Cox) is orphaned and sent to live with his uncle (Rod Taylor), who is a hitman. When the boy witnesses his uncle kill some people, his uncle orders that his assistant (Paul Winfield) help shoot the boy; the assistant refuses and takes off with the boy.

== Production ==
The movie marked the first time Rod Taylor had played an Australian character in an Australian film.

== Release ==
The film was not released theatrically, although it did have one theatrical screening in Bondi NSW, a condition of the movie's financing via tax concession.

== Reception ==
The Birmingham News's movie critic Kenneth Shorey panned the film. He wrote "Shot on scenic locations in Australia, On the Run is a long, rambling movie in which Paul Winfield talks to himself almost the entire time. His companion is a French boy, Beau Cox, who doesn't speak English and consequently has very little to do but look at Winfield quizzically." Variety states "B-movie fans will eventually catch up with the simple pleasures of this well made but minor opus after its unheralded current theatrical release."
