= Chris King (actor) =

Australian actor and entertainer (born 1956)

- Born: Christopher Roger King; 2 June 1956 (age 70); Hobart, Tasmania
- Occupations: Television actor, entertainer, talent manager

Christopher Roger King (born 2 June 1956) is an Australian actor, entertainer and talent school director.

King became best known for his six-year stint in Channel Nine's long-running soap opera The Young Doctors between 1976 and 1982, as hospital orderly later nurse as Dennis Jamison

He ran his own talent school with his first wife Susie, whilst raising his 7 children. Natalie Imbruglia is one of his former pupils.

He continued to have guest roles in shows such as A County Practice, Home andAway, Murder Call, All Saints etc

He also was arts and crafts director, supporting many ventures on the Central Coast including the local theatre, Laycock Street Theatre. Although having slowed down after a major stroke, Chris continues to defy all odds, and is still found treading the boards in local theatre productions. He is also a director of the Mingarra Club on the Central Coast.

== Filmography ==
Title	Year	Role
Number 96 (TV series)	1974	Wesley Walton
Lindsay's Boy (TV film)	1974	
Ben Hall (TV miniseries)	1975	Warrigal Walsh
Polly me Love (TV movie)	1975	
The Young Doctors (TV series)	1976-1982 1086 episodes	Dennis Jamison
Rafferty's Rules (TV series)	1989	Milkman
A Country Practice (TV series)	1989	Les Dunn
Home and Away (TV series)	1989	Plumber
Big Sky (TV series) (TV series)
, Water Rats	1999	Marty "Rabbit" Downes
Murder Call (TV series)	1998-2000	3 roles
All Saints (TV series)	1998-2000	2 roles
Much ado about Nothing (TV series)	2002	Guy
White Collar Blue (TV series)	2003	Frazer's Accomplice
