= Phoenix Five =

- Genre: Science fiction
- Created by: John Warwick
- Directed by: David Cahill
- Starring: Mike Dorsey
- Country of origin: Australia
- No. of seasons: 1
- No. of episodes: 26

Production
- Producers: Peter Summerton; John Walters
- Running time: 30 minutes

Original release
- Network: ABC
- Release: 10 January – 3 July 1970

Phoenix Five is an Australian science fiction television series which first screened on the ABC in 1970. It was later also screened on the Seven Network. It was part of a trilogy and followed on from the six part serial The Interpretaris in 1966 and seven part serial Vega 4 in 1968. However, it had 26 standalone episodes produced to make it viable as a syndicated series. Each of the series had different crews and casts but took place in the same future and used the same space organisation and miniatures, much as Star Trek did in the '80s and '90s, thus making it the first TV sci-fi franchise.

== Plot ==
The series was set in the year 2500 AD and followed the adventures of the crew of the galactic patrol ship Phoenix Five, "the most sophisticated craft in the Earth Space Control Fleet." This handpicked team consisted of Captain Roke, a typical heroic Kirk-style commander with a solution to every problem; Ensign Adam Hargraves, his stalwart young second-in-command always ready to shoot first and skip the questions; compassionate young navigator Cadet Tina Kulbrick; and their clunky, glass-domed Computeroid robot Karl. Together they patrolled the outer galaxies defending the innocent and warding off the repeated plots and attacks of the evil balding, blue-skinned humanoid Zodian of Zebula 9 and the eccentric pointy-eared renegade scientist Platonus.

Zodian originally appeared in Vega 4, and he and his head-shaped twin computers Alpha and Zeta were in the first 13 episodes of Phoenix Five, then were replaced by Platonus and his Cockney-accented computer Tommy for the latter half. This was due to a production break caused by the untimely death of producer Peter Summerton. He was replaced by John Walters.

== Production ==
Phoenix Five was produced in 1969 in Sydney by Artransa Park Television in association with the Australian Broadcasting Commission and Amalgamated Television Services. The series premiered on ABC television on Friday 24 April 1970 at 5:40pm with other states following in May 1970. It was also sold internationally and screened in the UK and other overseas markets in the 1970 & 1980s. It was repeated on the ABC in 1975 with the advent of Colour TV and last screened on ATN 7 and regional stations including WIN 4 Wollongong in the early 80's. All episodes exist complete in The National Sound and Film Archive but there has been no commercial release of the series, although odd eps of Interpretaris and Vega 4 and a dozen or so off air recordings of Phoenix Five have circulated among TV collectors since the 90's and found their way to YouTube at various times.

The series has often been belittled as a "Star Trek with gumtrees" but the original Interpretaris was made before Star Trek screened in Australia and it resembles more the children's TV space adventure series of the Fifties and Sixties like Rocky Jones, Space Ranger and Fireball XL5, which had been screened a number of times on Australian television. It has also been criticized for its low budget, but it more expensive than most Australian dramas of this period because it was made on film and in colour. Australia, at this time, did not have the numerous movie and TV special effects technicians who worked on US and UK productions - and the FX supervisor Peter Hicks really had to start from scratch. Indeed, costumes for the series were very expensive, ranging from floor-length robes for Zodian, pink tights for the 'microbe' girl (played by Arna-Maria Winchester) from the Planet Leonicus (from episode 3- To end is to begin), gold lame suits for the Phoenix Five crew and an aluminium suit for Karl the robot, with a perspex head covering fibreglass bulbs. Hicks said, of creating the 'Galaxy Garden' aboard the Phoenix Five: "I got ordinary commercial plastic plants and butchered them to make them look strange. In one sequence I made a gun to fire corrosive liquid onto the plants to make them shrivel up."

== Cast ==
- Mike Dorsey – Captain Roke
- Patsy Trench – Cadet Tina Kulbrick
- Damien Parker – Ensign Adam Hargraves
- Stuart Leslie – Karl the Computeroid
- Peter Collingwood – Earth Space Controller
- Redmond Phillips – Zodian
- Owen Weingott – Platonus
- Tommy Dysart
- Noeline Brown
