= Tim Page (actor) =

Australian actor, scriptwriter and singer

- Born: Tim Page; 1947 (age 78–79); New Zealand
- Occupations: Actor; scriptwriter; singer; narrator
- Years active: early 1970s
- Known for: The Young Doctors TV series

Tim Page (born 1947), is a New Zealand born Australian actor, scriptwriter and singer.

After emigrating from his birth country New Zealand in 1973 he was cast as Henrik Eggerman in Stephen Sondheim's A Little Night Music but he later became best known for playing Dr. Graham Steele in the Australian television series The Young Doctors throughout its entire run from 1976 to 1982. By the time of the final episode his character had risen from lowly intern to hospital superintendent.

In addition to acting, he has also worked as a script writer on episodes of The Restless Years and Neighbours.

== Stage and musical performances ==
Page's cabaret show based on songs associated from Shakespeare Out Damned Spot! has been successfully toured throughout Australia.

He played Baron Tusenbach in Chekhov's Three Sisters for the QTC and has continued his association with Sondheim musicals having played Pirelli in Sweeney Todd for the MTC, Zangara in Assassins and Narrator/Mysterious Man in Into The Woods. Most recently he played Andre in The Phantom of the Opera, Warbucks in Annie and Scrooge in A Christmas Carol.

In the late 1980s he appeared in a number of musicals in London's West End. He was in the original cast of Andrew Lloyd Webber's Aspects of Love at the Prince of Wales Theatre in 1989–90. He was also in Buddy - the Buddy Holly Story at the Victoria Palace Theatre in 1991. He recorded with the BBC Radio Orchestra and had seasons at the Bristol Old Vic Theatre Company and at the Wolsey Theatre, Ipswich. in 2014, he appeared in the musical Annie.

In the 1990s he appeared in My Fair Lady with Anthony Warlow, Ken Hill's Phantom of the Opera, Chess, Assassins

== Television and film ==
Page has appeared in the TV series Water Rats and All Saints. His films include Passion, Lilian's Story (with Ruth Cracknell), The Everlasting Secret Family, The Road From Coorain, The Wreck of the Stinson and plays Dr Gene Seward in the 2015 film Lead Me Astray.

== Other roles ==
Page has played Bialystock in The Producers, Georges in La Cage Aux Folles and the Bishop of Basingstoke in Jekyll and Hyde which toured Korea and Taiwan. GMS cast him as John Utterson in their 2012 production of Jekyll and Hyde. He won a Best Actor Star Award for his portrayal of Danforth in The Crucible.

== Singing, writing and directing ==
Page has sung with opera companies on both sides of the Tasman and for the London Savoyards. Most recently he has appeared in Aida and The Girl of the Golden West for Opera Queensland. In 2013 he was asked by the Central Coast Conservatorium to direct the opera Help! Help! The Globolinks! by Gian Carlo Menotti and also to begin a Triple Threat Music Theatre Course. He is partnered in these endeavours by Allan Royal.

In 2014 Page wrote a new English translation of Mozart's "The Magic Flute" to go with Central Coast Opera's production which he also directed. In 2016 he again directed and wrote a new English performing version of Bizet's "Carmen" which was a popular hit for Central Coast Opera. In 2018 he was cast as Benoit and Alcindoro in the same company's "La Boheme" and also sang the role of Spoletta for Central Coast Lyric Opera's production of "Tosca". In 2021 he is producing a moved concert version of "La Traviata" in support of the Crestani Scholarships, a charity working for better outcomes for cancer patients. His most recent musical theatre roles have been Mayor Shinn in "The Music Man", Dr Dillamond in "Wicked" and Les Kendall in "Strictly Ballroom" all produced by GMS.
