= The Young Doctors =

Australian medical soap opera television series (1976–1983)

- Genre: Soap opera
- Created by: Alan Coleman
- Developed by: Reg Watson
- Written by: Alan Coleman; Reg Watson; Betty Quin; Ian Coughlan; Ian Bradley; Patrea Smallacombe; Tom MacLennen; Michael Laurence; Brenda Little; Tony Morphett; Peter Connah; Cheryl McLennand; Ron McLean; Julian Halls; Richard Lane; Jeff Ashby; Rick Maier; John Misto; Cheridith Mok; Roger Hudson; Ben Mitchell; Helen Carmichael; John Paramor; Sue Smith; Sue Masters; David Phillips; Craig Wilkins; Brian Faull; Margaret Hilton-Blundell
- Directed by: Alan Coleman; Reg Watson; Ian Coughlan; Max Varnel; David C. Wilson; Brian Faull; Peita Letchford; Kendal Flanagan; Chris Adshead; Mike Murphy; Chris Connelly; Michael Pattinson; Phillip Bowman; Rusty Buckley; Denny Lawrence; Wayne Cameron
- Starring: (see detailed cast and character list below)
- Theme music composer: Alan Olivan / Brian King
- Opening theme: The Young Doctors, performed by The Executives
- Ending theme: The Young Doctors, performed by The Executives
- Composer: Olivan/King
- Country of origin: Australia
- Original language: English
- No. of seasons: 6
- No. of episodes: 1,397 (60 minute pilot episode and 1,396 30-minute episodes)

Production
- Executive producer: Reg Watson
- Producers: Alan Coleman; Sue Masters
- Production locations: The Film Centre, North Sydney
- Running time: 25 minutes
- Production company: Reg Grundy Organisation

Original release
- Network: Nine Network
- Release: 8 November 1976 – 30 March 1983

Related
- Starting Out

The Young Doctors is an Australian early-evening soap opera originally broadcast on the Nine Network and produced by the Reg Grundy Organisation, it aired from Monday 8 November 1976 until Wednesday 30 March 1983. The series is primarily set in the fictional Albert Memorial Hospital, as well as the restaurant/nightclub Bunny's Place, and is fundamentally concerned with the romances and relations between younger members of the hospital staff, rather than typical medical issues and procedures.

The program was shown and exported internationally including throughout North America and Canada and Europe including the United Kingdom, the Netherlands, France and Spain.

== Series history ==
=== Early years ===
The series broadcast by the Nine Network produced by the Grundy Organisation was created and devised by Alan Coleman with Reg Watson serving as Executive Producer.

Watson had been the Producer of the British TV soap opera Crossroads from 1964 to 1973 and moved back to Australia to help set up a new drama department within the Reg Grundy Organisation, which at the time, was better known for its game and quiz shows. With Coleman producing, as well as Watson's experience of making fast-turnaround, five-days a week serial drama, The Young Doctors became the third soap opera produced by the Reg Grundy Organisation following the Seven Network's serials Class of 74 / 75, and Until Tomorrow, which screened briefly in 1975.

The Young Doctors began in November 1976, a week earlier than another new soap opera on Network Nine, The Sullivans, which was produced by Crawford Productions. The Nine Network made it clear only one of the series would be commissioned beyond the initial 13-week production run (approximately 65 episodes).

The Sullivans, which had a three times greater budget, after the trial period emerged as the critical success, so The Young Doctors was cancelled.

Fans however lobbied the Nine Network, who then reversed their decision and by popular demand The Young Doctors continued in its daily 6.00 pm slot and had a successful run of six and a half years, making it one of Australia's longest running and popular serials of the time.

=== Later years ===
The Young Doctors long-serving cast members began to leave, so during the final season in 1982–83, many new characters were added in an attempt to modernise and refresh the long-running serial.

Producer and co-creator Alan Coleman also left in early 1982, and was replaced by Sue Masters twelve months before the series finished production in late November 1982. Masters went on to produce Grundy's replacement medical soap, Starting Out, for Nine, and then Grundy's stablemate, Prisoner, from 1983.

Several cast members after the series ended production went on to have leading roles in internationally successful cult series Prisoner including Judy McBurney, Genevieve Lemon, Babs McMillan, Tottie Goldsmith and Peter Bensley.

The loss of several popular cast members had contributed to a sharp decline in ratings, and as a consequence of this, the series was cancelled in late 1982. The advent of one-day cricket had led to the Nine Network moving the show around the schedules, particularly in Sydney where it was first moved to 5pm weekdays and, after its cancellation was announced, broadcasts were reduced to a weekly hour-long episode late on Saturday afternoons from November 1982.

When the series ended after 1397 episodes, it held the then record of Australia's longest-running commercial television drama serial. This was later surpassed by A Country Practice and then Neighbours,

The Young Doctors final episode aired on 30 March 1983 at 18:00 in Melbourne and on 15 October 1983 at 17:30 in Sydney.

== Stories and settings ==
=== Albert Memorial Hospital ===
Despite the hospital setting, medical procedures rarely featured in storylines, with the majority of the stories and plots focusing more on the personal lives, romances and dramas of the staff. All scenes were played out in the various sets forming the Albert Memorial Hospital. A memorial plaque situated on the wall of the studio set of the hospital's exterior stated the hospital opened in 1889 and it is also established early in the series that the fictional Albert Memorial is located in a Sydney district, with Sydney generically referred to as 'the City'.

A "real life" Albert Memorial Hospital, commonly referred to as the A. M. Hospital was located in Wollongong, and commenced operation in 1864, however closed when the Wollongong Hospital opened in 1907.

The most regularly seen set was the large hospital's entrance lobby containing a reception desk, refreshments kiosk, a lift and stairs to the upper floors, and swinging double-doors that led into the casualty department. Various wards, offices, theatres and small medicine labs all saw an equal amount of romantic and dramatic action over the years. Alan Coleman revealed on a DVD release of the series that the various 'flats' used as sets were simply re-dressed with different hospital equipment and furniture giving the Albert Memorial a sense of monotony often associated with clinical, hospital environments.

Later in The Young Doctors run, location shooting became more frequent and viewers saw more of the hospital's exterior and grounds. Scenes filmed outside the hospital now showed modern, 1960s era buildings, presumably extensions to the original Victorian hospital. Exterior shots were filmed at the real life Royal North Shore Hospital and the former Greenwich Hospital, Sydney, New South Wales, which was used for later exterior shots. There was also a Chapel located in the hospital grounds which was filmed on a few occasions, most notably when Julie Holland was shot at the altar on her Wedding day to Dr Russell Edwards. With location shooting so rare, a trip to Melbourne for a travelogue-style Wedding and tour of the city was an extravagant way to celebrate Liz Kennedy's marriage to Dr John Forrest in 1981.

=== Bunny's Place ===
There was also a local bar Bunny's Place which was another venue for the staff to mingle. The bar was originally owned by, and named after, Bunny Howard, played by comedian, Ugly Dave Gray, who was killed off in an early episode. Bunny's Place was said to be situated on the opposite side of the busy main road to the hospital. After Bunny died, Edna Curtis (Vivienne Benson-Young) ran the bar for a while, until Annemarie Austin (Judi Connelli) took over a year later. Dr Mike Newman (Peter Bensley) later took over the ownership of Bunny's. Although the bar's exterior was never shown on-screen, its interior regularly featured in many episodes for the duration of the 6 1/2-year series, appearing in both the first and final episodes.

== Cast and characters ==
=== Early characters ===
The Young Doctors had a relatively high turnover of young cast playing the doctors and nurses who featured alongside a more stable roster of longer-running elder cast members. The serial also featured many well-known Australian actors appearing in their earliest roles.

=== Cultural impact ===
Although The Young Doctors was obviously low-budget and the limitations of the fast-turnaround production schedule sometimes crept into the programme, it was immensely popular during the late 1970s in Australia. One highlight episode of this period was the Wedding Day of Tania (Judy McBurney) to Tony Garcia (Tony Alvarez) in March 1978. The producers splashed out on an OB unit, and a rare church wedding took place with the wedding photos gracing all of the week's TV magazine covers. In a 2006 interview, Judy McBurney, who played Tania, commented; "I thought Young Doctors was a beautiful show. I felt it was innocent, sweet, and a good show...and I think that's why people remember it".

One of the programmes most popular doctors was Ben Fielding, played by Eric Oldfield. He was also Male Model of the Year in 1977 and became the second man to appear naked in a centre spread for Cleo magazine whilst appearing in the show. The actor fondly recalls the photo shoot on a reunion documentary available on both the Umbrella and ViaVision DVD releases, where he describes the pictures as "taboo" because "it wasn't acceptable back then for men to be taking all their clothes off". Oldfield also commented that the pictures have since garnered a popular cult following amongst gay men.

Another notable actor, Russell Crowe, appeared in his first acting role in The Young Doctors. In an episode originally aired in 1977, appropriately, he played a young boy called Russell.

During the 1970s, a number of actors appearing in the show also had singing careers, preempting a similar fad for "singing soap stars" a decade later with another Grundy soap opera, Neighbours. Early episodes featured singers including Jewel Blanch, Mark Hembrow, Bartholomew John, Mark Holden and Judi Connelli. Possibly due to the fast production schedule, and filming six months in advance of transmission dates, contemporary cultural references are rare in The Young Doctors, however, in a very early 1977 episode, Sister Gibbs briskly remarks; "...casualty is busier than an ABBA concert today". The reference to ABBA is likely due to the fact that their 1977 film, Abba: The Movie, was at the same time being produced by Reg Grundy Productions.

Also extremely popular in the United Kingdom, the success of The Young Doctors here is notable because it didn't air in Britain contemporaneously with Australian broadcasts. Most ITV regions did not start showing it until after it had ended in Australia in March 1983. It therefore looked somewhat dated compared with more recent Australian serials that were airing at the same time (namely, Sons and Daughters), nevertheless, it became so popular, a fan club was formed, which was active for several years well into the 1990s.

=== Awards (Note: The Young Doctors has the distinction, rare among popular series, to have no award wins from any major media institutions, despite high ratings, magazine and media covers, and VHS and DVD campaigns. However, it received numerous nominations as a series, as well as nominations for its stars.) ===
Organisation	Category	Year	Results
Australian Film and Television Awards	Best Drama Award	1978	Nominated
Australian Film and Television Awards	Best Actor in a TV Series	1978	Nominated Tim Page for portrayal of Dr. Graham Steele
Australian Film and Television Awards	Best Actress in a TV series	1978	Nominated Joanne Samuel for portrayal of Jill Gordon
Sammy Awards	Gold Sammy	1978	Nominated Cornelia Frances for portrayal of Sister/Matron Grace Scott
Sammy Awards	Gold Sammy	1978	Nominated Delvene Delaney for portrayal of Jo Jo Adams
Australian Film and Television Awards	Best Drama	1979	Nominated
Australian Film and Television Awards	Best Actor in a TV Series	1979	Nominated Peter Lochran for portrayal of Dr. Peter Holland
Sammy Awards	Golden Sammy	1979	Nominated Diana McLean
Sammy Awards	Golden Sammy	1979	Nominated Peter Lochran
Sammy Awards	Golden Sammy	1979	Nominated Joanne Samuel
Australian Film and TV Awards	Best Drama Series	1980	Nominated

Cornelia Frances on the DVD release audio commentary for episode 325 titled, Classic Cliffhangers, that she lost out on the Logie Award for Best Actress for two consecutive years to Lorraine Bayly, who played Grace Sullivan in The Sullivans, which also beat The Young Doctors as Best Drama in 1978, 1979 and 1980.

=== Regular cast informations ===
There was consistently a core cast of 16 regular characters in The Young Doctors, with all cast members contracted to appear in three out of a block of five episodes each week. Sometimes, a regular character would not be seen on-screen for several weeks and there is an obvious rotation of recurring characters whom came and went as script requirements permitted. More often than not, a departing regular character would simply disappear from the screen, but their presence in the serial would be maintained by regular scripted references to the character being elsewhere in the hospital, or, as Cornelia Frances described it, "stuck in a cupboard for weeks", but, always off screen.

== Cast ==
=== Doctors ===
Actor	Doctor	Duration
Tim Page	Dr. Graham Steele	1976–1983 (original cast)
Alfred Sandor	Dr. Raymond Shaw	1976–1983 (original cast)
Michael Beecher	Dr. Brian Denham	1976–1983 (original cast)
John Dommett	Dr. Jim Howard	1976–1979 (original cast)
Mark Holden	Dr. Greg Mason	1976–1977, 1981 (original cast)
John Walton	Dr. Craig Rothwell	1976–1977 (original cast)
Peta Toppano	Dr. Gail Henderson	1976–1978 (original cast)
Robert Coleby	Dr. Paul Barratt	1977
Judy Lynne	Dr. Susan Richards	1977–1980
Barry Creyton	Dr. John Somerville	1977
Brian Moll	Dr. Vincent Snape	1977–1979
Tony Alvarez	Dr. Tony Garcia	1977–1979
Bartholomew John	Dr. Chris Piper	1977–1979
Paul Mason	Dr. Mike Neilson	1977
Andrew Sharp	Dr. Andrew Baxter	1977–1978
Veronica Lang	Dr. Lesley Collins	1978
Gordon McDougall	Dr. Crewe	1978–1979
Tim Elliot	Professor William Hume	1978
Kevin Wilson	Dr. David Meredith	1978
Eric Oldfield	Dr. Ben Fielding	1978–1982
Peter Lochran	Dr. Peter Holland	1978–1982
Chris Orchard	Dr. Rod Langley	1978–1980
Rebecca Gilling	Dr. Liz Kennedy	1979–1981
Alan Dale	Dr. John Forrest	1979–1983
Serge Lazareff	Dr. Ian Parrish	1979
Peter Bensley	Dr. Mike Newman	1979–1983
Eileen Colocott	Dr. Marion Stoddard	1979
Mike Dorsey	Dr. Clifford Langley	1979
John Hamblin	Dr. Dan Wheatley	1979, 1981
Peter Cousens	Dr. Russell Edwards	1980–1981
Joy Chambers	Dr. Robyn Porter	1980–1981
Carole Skinner	Dr. Judith Anne Napier (aka Dr. Hall)	1980–1981
Vince Martin	Dr. Richard Quinlan	1981–1982
Raina McKeon	Dr. Martha Ahmed	1981–1982
Adrian Van Den Bok	Dr. Nick Barratt	1982–1983
Michael Gow	Dr. Lance Wilkinson	1982
Nick Holland	Dr. Matt Burke	1982
Graham Harvey	Dr. David Henderson	1982–1983
John O’Brien	Dr. Ian Mitchell	1982–1983
Sally Tayler	Dr Vicki Daniels	1982–1983
Carole Skinner	Dr Judith Ann Napier	1980

=== Sisters ===
Actor	Sister	Duration
Cornelia Frances	Sister/Matron Grace Scott	1976–1979 (original cast)
Susanne Stuart	Sister Suzanne Gibbs	1976 (extra) 1977–1983 (regular)
Jeanie Drynan	Sister Margaret Evans	1977
Judy McBurney	Sister/Nurse Tania Livingstone	1977–1983
Anne Lucas	Sister Eve Turner	1977–1980
Sheila D'Union	Spinal Unit Sister	1977
Diana McLean	Sister Vivienne Jeffries	1978–1982
Babs McMillan	Sister Erin Cosgrove	1982–1983
Helen Scott (as Helen Hough)	Sister Norma Campbell	1981
Doug McGrath	Matron Duncan Love	1981

=== Nurses ===
Actor	Nurse	Duration
Delvene Delaney	Jo Jo Adams	1976–1977 (original cast)
Margaret Nelson	Julie Warner	1976–1977 (original cast)
Joanne Samuel	Jill Gordon	1976–1979 (original cast)
Kathryn Dagher	Kelly Jones	1977
Gregory Apps	Martin Price	1977, 1978–1979
Paula Duncan	Lisa Brooks	1977–1978
Louise Howitt	Deborah Kendall	1977
Ros Wood	Kate Rhodes	1977–1982
Lynda Stoner	Kim Barrington	1977–1979
Lisa Aldenhoven	Julie Holland	1978–1981
Rosie Bailey	Virginia Mason	1978–1981
Debbie Baile	Vicki Rayner	1978–1979
Robyn Gibbes	Angela Parry	1978
Kim Krejus	Sally Brown	1978
Carla Hoogeveen	Jeanette Palmer	1978
Karen Pini	Sherry Andrews	1979–1982
Margaret Laurence	Yvonne Davies	1979
Julie Wilson	Jodie Carter	1980–1981
Jackie Woodburne	Maggie Gordon	1981–1982
Christine Harris	Dolly Davis	1982–1983
Julie Nihill	Linda Wilson	1982–1983
Susan Stenmark	Genevieve Ridgeway	1982–1983
Joanne Olsen	Jo Bourke	1982-83
Juli Field	Emmy King	1982
Genevieve Lemon	Zelda Baker	1983
Julianne White	Diana Trent	1983

=== Hospital staff ===
Actor	Role	Duration
Gwen Plumb	Ada Simmonds	1976–1983 (Original cast)
Lyn James	Helen Gordon	1976–1983 (original cast)
Chris King	Orderly Dennis Jamison	1976–1982 (original cast)
Kim Wran	Caroline Fielding	1977, 1978–1982
Robert Leys	Mark Holland	1978–1980
Harold Hopkins	Orderly Terry Cooper	1978
Kent Strickland	Orderly Damian Swift	1979
Robert Korosy	Flint Stone	1982–1983
Lois Ramsey	Winnie Parsons	1981
Tottie Goldsmith	Toni Sheffield	1982–1983
Stephen McDonald	Orderly Tim Jones	1982–1983

=== Recurring and guest cast ===
Actor	Character	Duration
Joanna Moore-Smith	Laura Denham	1976–1977 (original cast) 1979–1980 (recurring)
Ugly Dave Gray	Bunny Howard	1976 (original cast, to episode 43)
Vivienne Benson-Young	Edna Curtis	1976–1977 (original cast)
Ric Herbert	Roger Gordon	1976–1978 (recurring)
Iain Finlay	Frank Curtis	1976 (guest)
Greg Kelly	Toby Denham	1976–1977 (recurring)
Jewel Blanch	Abbie Singleton	1976 (guest)
Virginia Rudeno	Maurren Howard	1976–1977 (recurring)
Gerry Sont	Ric Martin	1978 (guest)
Carol Raye	Rosalie Parker	1976–1977 (recurring)
Willie Fennell	Arthur Simmonds	1977–1978 (recurring)
Shirley Cameron	Dot Warner	1977 (guest)
Russell Crowe	Russell	1977 (special guest)
Abigail	Hilary Templeton	1977, 1978 (recurring)
Noel Trevarthen	Phillip Winter	1977 (guest)
Mark Hembrow	Georgie Saint	1977, 1978, 1979 (recurring)
Mark Hashfield	Milt Baxter	1977 (guest)
James Condon	Sir Thomas Kendall	1977 (guest)
June Salter	Mrs. Nielsen	1977 (guest)
Anne Semler	Irene Hardy	1977 (guest)
Julieanne Newbould	Glenda Stacy	1977 (guest)
John Jarratt	Ben Stone	1977 (guest)
Judi Connelli	Annemarie Austin	1977–1978 (recurring)
Anna Hruby	Sandy Pearce	1977–1978 (recurring)
Moya O'Sullivan	Rene Brooks	1977 (guest)
Peter Adams	Clarrie Baker	1977 (guest)
Bronwen Samuel	Vicky Clayton	1977 (guest)
Tina Grenville	Cora Clayton	1977 (guest)
Karen Petersen	Erika Hoffman	1978–1980 (recurring)
Enid Lorimer	Amelia Frost	1978 (guest)
Harriet Littlesmith	Roxanne Moore	1978 (guest)
Hilda Scurr	Moira Callagan	1978
Brian Harrison	Edward Gordon	1978–1979
Elizabeth Kemp	Deirdre Snape	1979 (guest)
Vincent Ball	Kevin McCallister	1979
Simon Burke	David McCallister	1979
Wallas Eaton	Roland Perry	1979–1980 (recurring)
Penne Hackforth-Jones	Lois Morton	1979
June Collis	Mrs. Newman	1979, 1981 (recurring)
Joe Hasham	Ken Hansen	1979 (guest)
Kit Taylor	Steven Newman	1979, 1981–1982 (recurring)
Carmen Duncan	Sylvia Marcus	1979
Betty Lucas	Sophie Bertram	1979 (guest)
Bill Kerr	Douglas Kennedy	1980
Ros Wood	Rachel Thorpe	1980 (guest)
Jessica Noad	Hazel Kennedy	1980 (guest)
Diane Craig	Diane Brooke	1980–1981 (recurring)
Ron Shand	Arthur Shepherd	1981 (guest)
Benita Collings	Pippa Blake	1982
Mary Ward	Mrs. Wilson	1982
Frank Lloyd	Ted Wilcox	1993 (guest)
Caz Lederman	Beverley Adler	1978 (guest)
Tony Ward	Stuart Gordon	1978 (guest)
Adela St.Clair	Barmaid	1978 (guest)
Andrew James	Tim Clark	1979 (guest)
Nicholas Frazer	Larry Everett	1979 (guest)
Helen Benbow	Kiosk Attendant	1979 (guest)
Gordon Charles	Dr Palmer	1979 (guest)
Mark Spain	Tony Brown	1979 (guest)
Gai Waterhouse	Natalie French	1978 (guest)
George Leppard	Bank Teller	1979 (guest)
John Warnock	Robin Chester	1979 (guest)
Frances Hargreaves	Emma Dixon	1979
Mary Ward	Mrs Wilson	1982
Candy Raymond	Margot Cunningham	1979 (guest)

== International broadcasts ==
The relatively long-running serial also achieved modest international cult success, particularly in the United Kingdom, where it was broadcast on the ITV network. It also aired in New Zealand, France and Spain.

=== United Kingdom ===
In the United Kingdom, the programme was acquired by 13 of the 14 weekday members of the ITV Network, Scottish Television never purchased the series. Most of the ITV regions screened The Young Doctors at their own regional pace, starting in January 1982.

- Central Television pioneered the programme in a Tuesday and Thursday 12:30 slot from Tuesday 19 January 1982, but during the year, moved to Monday and Tuesdays at 15:45, sharing the slot with the then seasonal Scottish soap opera, Take the High Road, which had started in 1980. In January 1983, episodes increased to daily at 15:30 until Sons and Daughters began in February. These two serials then shared this timeslot for well over four years, with The Young Doctors always airing on Mondays and Tuesdays. This continued until September 1987 when a revamp of ITV's daytime schedule saw Central return the programme to 12:00 noon, and then 12:35, thus allowing both The Young Doctors and Sons and Daughters to increase to four or five episodes a week in their revised respective slots. Following the end of Sons and Daughters in December 1988, The Young Doctors returned to 15:30 during Christmas week, and usually aired Tuesday to Friday until Families began in April 1990, which took the Monday and Tuesday 15:30 slot. The Young Doctors was finally moved to 14:50-15:20, Monday to Thursday later in 1990, and finished on Tuesday 18 August 1992, the first ITV region to complete all of the series.
- HTV started the series on Tuesday 4 January 1983 and continued regularly twice weekly. Initially broadcast Mondays and Fridays at 17:15-17:45, it was soon moved to 15:30-16:00 on Mondays and Tuesdays and finished on 18 April 1994.
- Granada Television and Border Television both broadcast daily episodes five days a week from September 1983. From January 1984, this was reduced to three weekly episodes, Wednesday to Friday where it remained until the Wednesday episode was dropped in October 1989. During the month of August on some years Granada and Border would pause the series for the summer month. Both regions overtook Central for several years, however, they ultimately finished the series after Central on April 2, 1993 at 15:20.
- Anglia Television started on 3 September 1984, going out Mondays and Tuesdays at 15:30 until 17 April 1990; then changed to Wednesdays and Thursdays from 25 April 1990. It was then moved to Thursdays and Fridays from Friday 6 July 1990 and an additional Wednesday episode returns in January 1991. Then Mondays to Fridays from January 1992 and finally, Thursdays and Fridays at 13:55 until Friday 2 June 1995.
- Thames Television and LWT started screening the series initially at 17:15 on Thursdays and Fridays from 23 June 1983 until 1 September 1984, before switching the series to 15:30 slot, to allow Blockbusters the slot. From this point onwards, only Thames broadcast the series. When Carlton Television took over in January 1993, the series was dropped for six months to allow backlog of Blockbusters episodes to be aired, The Young Doctors returned daily on 7 June 1993 concluding the programme as an 80-minute special from 13:55 on Friday 30 December 1994.
- Grampian Television started on Monday 14 November 1983, increased to four episodes per week by 1991, and finished on Friday 30 September 1994.
- TVS started on Monday 9 April 1984 broadcasting Mondays and Tuesdays 15:30; In May switched; Mondays to Wednesdays 17:15 for summer 1984; then Thursdays and Fridays 15:30 from early September 1984; then Mondays to Wednesdays from January 1985 until Wednesday 2 September 1987; then Wednesdays and Thursdays at 12:00 noon; then Mondays, Wednesdays and Fridays used from 4 January 1988 15.30; then Tuesdays, Wednesdays and Thursdays from 25 April 1990. TVS lost their franchise at the end of 1992 but their successor, Meridian continued to show the series (more information on the timeslot required) and completed the run on 8 July 1993.
- Tyne Tees Television began the series on Monday 1 October 1984 and aired Mondays and Tuesdays 15:30 until 17 April 1990. It was then moved to Tuesdays and Wednesdays at 14:00 from 25 April 1990. From Thursday 3 January 1991 moves to 15:20 Thursdays and Fridays. A Wednesday episode was added from 23 January 1991, and then from January 1992, it is broadcast Mondays to Fridays at 15:20. From Monday 4 January 1993, Tyne Tees and Yorkshire screened the programme daily at 15:20. From January 1994 until the end in December of that year, this changed to Monday – Thursday at 14.50.
- TSW started the series on 1 April 1985, Monday and Fridays at 17:15 until 8 July, when it was moved to 15.30 slot. On 17 October 1988, the series moves to 12:30 on Mondays and Wednesdays but due to TSW choosing to screen the daily afternoon repeat of Home and Away at 15:25 this resulted in the series becoming weekly during 1989/1990 at 13:30. By 1992 the pace was increased substantially to five days a week at 14:45. Westcountry Television took over in 1993, and continued twice a week until early 1994 when it was increased to three times a week until 20 December 1995 when episode 1101 was broadcast. The series was not completed.
- Channel Television followed the same pattern at TSW until December 1985, then for technical reasons switched to showing the same episodes as TVS from January 1986, meaning a chunk of approximately 175 episodes were not shown in the Channel Islands.
- Years after most of the other regions Yorkshire Television started the series in June 1988, going out five times a week at 12:30, reducing to three times a week from January 1989. In September 1989, the series moved to 15:25 daily with the Wednesday episode dropped from October. In April 1990, the series output is further reduced to two episodes a week on Thursdays and Fridays before the resumption of the Wednesday episode in early 1991. During 1992, the series fluctuates between three, four and five episodes a week ending the year on episode 764. In January 1993, they had to skip 215 episodes to enable them to catch up to Tyne Tees, as from January 1993, both regions screened exactly the same material. It aired daily at 15:20, until January 1994 when the Friday episode was dropped until the series ended on Thursday 15 December 1994.
- UTV commenced the series in 1984, with a very slow broadcasting rate. They showed 26 episodes in 1984 (reaching episode 24) but the show then disappeared from the schedules in Northern Ireland until 1 August 1988, when the series was transmitted again from the very first episode. UTV had reached episode 75 by the end of 1988 but the pace was slowed down considerably and the series was dropped in 1994 with episode 360 being the last episode shown.
- The Young Doctors was also aired on Sky Channel. On Monday 6 February 1989, the first episode was broadcast 17:00–17:30. From 6 July 1989, it was moved to 15.15–15.45 (to make way for Sky Star Search which took the 17:00–18:00 slot). 256 episodes were broadcast in these slots. In February 1990, now called Sky One, the channel dropped another Australian soap, The Sullivans, from their mid-morning schedule, so from 5 February 1990, The Young Doctors rewound back to the first episode (due to almost catching up with some ITV regions, and having overtaken Yorkshire Television and Ulster Television), and it was aired now 10:30-11:00. Sky One eventually cancelled The Young Doctors just over two years later, at episode 589, which aired on Friday 29 May 1992.

ITV region in start date order	Air dates of significant episodes													
ITV region in start date order	ep 40 Grace at the altar	ep 227 Graham and Eve marry	ep 256 1977 cliffhanger	ep 281 Tony and Tania marry	ep 327 Arrival of Jeffries	ep 469 1978 cliffhanger	ep 474 Raymond and Erica marry	ep 529 aftermath of Barrington shooting	episode 679 Liz and Ben wedding aftermath	ep 717 Dennis and Caroline marry	ep 872 Julie is shot at her wedding	episode 1000	ep 1019 John and Liz marry	ep 1077 1981 cliffhanger
Central Television	Tue 15/06/82 12:30	Tue 05/06/84 15:30	Tue 18/09/84 15:30	Mon 17/12/84 15:30	Mon 24/06/85 15:30	Mon 15/12/86 15:30	Tue 30/12/86 15:45	Tue 28/07/87 15:30	Fri 05/08/88 12:35	Wed 12/10/88 12:35	Thu 08/06/89 15:30	Tue 19/12/89 15:30	Fri 26/01/90 15:30	
HTV (Wales & West)	Mon 01/08/83 17:15				Mon 16/12/85 15:30	Mon 15/06/87 15:30	Tue 30/06/87 15:30	Mon 18/01/88 15:30	Mon 07/08/89 15:30	Tue 19/12/89 15:30				
Thames Television	Thu 17/11/83 17:15	Mon 04/11/85 15:30	Tue 18/02/86 15:30	Mon 09/06/86 15:30	Tue 18/11/86 15:30	Mon 09/05/88 15:30	Tue 24/05/88 15:30	Mon 12/12/88 15:30	Tue 02/08/90 15:25	Thu 01/11/90 15:25	Wed 27/11/91 15:25		Fri 17/07/92 15:20	
Granada Television	Tue 01/11/83 15:30	Thu 13/12/84 15:30	Wed 06/03/85 15:30	Fri 03/05/85 15:30	Fri 23/08/85 15:30	Fri 12/09/86 15:30	Thu 25/09/86 15:30	Wed 11/02/87 15:30	Fri 29/01/88 15:30	Thu 28/04/88 15:30	Thu 27/04/89 15:30	Thu 26/04/90 15:30	Fri 06/07/90 15:25	Thu 24/01/91 15:25
Border Television	Tue 01/11/83 15:30	Thu 13/12/84 15:30	Wed 06/03/85 15:30	Fri 03/05/85 15:30	Fri 23/08/85 15:30	Fri 12/09/86 15:30	Thu 25/09/86 15:30	Wed 11/02/87 15:30	Fri 29/01/88 15:30	Thu 28/04/88 15:30	Thu 27/04/89 15:30	Thu 26/04/90 15:30	Fri 06/07/90 15:25	Thu 24/01/91 15:25
Grampian Television	Wed 01/02/84 15:30							Mon 30/01/89 15:30					Thu 12/11/92 15:20	
Ulster Television (UTV)	Wed 09/11/88 15:30				Mon 21/02/94 14:50	Not screened	Not screened	Not screened	Not screened	Not screened	Not screened	Not screened	Not screened	Not screened
Television South (TVS)	Wed 01/08/84 15:30	Wed 08/01/86 15:30	Tue 11/03/86 15:30	Tue 20/05/86 15:30					Mon 06/03/89 15:30	Fri 09/06/89 15:30			Thu 12/09/91 13:50	
Anglia Television	Tue 05/02/85 15:30	Tue 20/01/87 15:30	Mon 18/05/87 15:30	Mon 17/08/87 15:30	Mon 08/02/88 15:30	Mon 31/07/89 15:30	Tue 15/08/89 15:30	Mon 12/03/90 15:30	Wed 15/05/91 15:25	Fri 09/08/91 15:25	Thu 11/06/92 15:25	Thu 14/01/93 15:20	Wed 10/02/93 15:20	Wed 12/05/93 15:20
Tyne Tees Television	Tue 05/03/85 15:30	Mon 23/02/87 15:30	Tue 23/06/87 15:30	Tue 22/09/87 15:30	Mon 14/03/88 15:30	Tue 05/09/89 15:30	Mon 25/09/89 15:30	Tue 17/04/90 15:30	Thu 25/07/91 15:25	Thu 07/11/91 15:25	Mon 20/07/92 15:20	Tue 02/02/93 15:20	Mon 01/03/93 15:20	Tue 01/06/93 15:20
Television South West (TSW)	Fri 08/11/85 15:25	Mon 05/10/87 15:30	Fri 29/01/88 15:30	Fri 29/04/88 15:30	Mon 17/10/88 12:30	Mon 04/12/89 13:30	Mon 22/01/90 13:30	Mon 08/04/91 14:50	Wed 08/07/92 14:45				Thu 01/06/95 14:25	
Channel Television	Fri 08/11/85 15:25	Wed 08/01/86 15:30	Tue 11/03/86 15:30	Tue 20/05/86 15:30					Mon 06/03/89 15:30	Fri 09/06/89 15:30			Thu 12/09/91 13:50	
Yorkshire Television (YTV)	Tue 02/08/88 12:30	Mon 07/08/89 12:30	Mon 02/10/89 15:30	Fri 10/11/89 15:30	Mon 05/02/90 15:30	Wed 20/03/91 15:25	Wed 03/04/91 15:25	Wed 14/07/91 15:25	Tue 16/06/92 15:25	Thu 10/09/92 15:25	Not screened	Tue 02/02/93 15:20	Mon 01/03/93 15:20	Tue 01/06/93 15:20

- The longest amount of time that passed for an episode to be first shown and its last showing was the first half hour of the pilot. It was first screened by Central on Tuesday 19 January 1982 at 12.30 and eventually aired on YTV nearly six and a half years later on Monday 6 June 1988 at 12.30.

ITV Region in start date order	End of Year Episode Numbers										
ITV Region in start date order	1982	1983	1984	1985	1986	1987	1988	1989	1990	1991	1992
Central Television	89	187	282	377	474	572	772	1004	1132	??	1396
HTV West & Wales	Not yet purchased	125	235	330	4??	524	621	717	??	940	1170
Thames Television	Not yet purchased	50	1??	2??	3??	435	532	628	7??	884 screened on Mon 06/01/92	1103
Granada Television	Not yet purchased	77	228	375	512	667	822	967	1069	1207	1357
Border Television	Not yet purchased	77	228	375	512	667	822	967	1069	1207	1357
Grampian Television	Not yet purchased	27	134	228	??	??	521	617	???	??	1034
Ulster Television	Not yet purchased	Not yet purchased	24	Off air	Off air	Off air	75	161			
Television South (TVS)	Not yet purchased		??	224	369	??	652	790	921	1058	1271
Anglia Television	Not yet purchased	Not yet purchased	30			316	413	509			
Tyne Tees Television	Not yet purchased	Not yet purchased	22	117	2??	307	403	499		736	979
Television South West (TSW)	Not yet purchased	Not yet purchased	Not yet purchased	53	150	??	347	471	516	560	793
Channel Television	Not yet purchased	Not yet purchased	Not yet purchased	53	369		652	790	921	1058	1271
Yorkshire Television (YTV)	Not yet purchased	Not yet purchased	Not yet purchased	Not yet purchased	Not yet purchased	Not yet purchased	136	307	4??	579	764
Scottish Television (STV)	Never shown	Never shown	Never shown	Never shown	Never shown	Never shown	Never shown	Never shown	Never shown	Never shown	Never shown

- During 1986, regions intending to screen episodes on 19 March (announcement of engagement of Sarah Ferguson and Prince Andrew) and 2 April (terrorist airline bomb) at 15.30 (TVS, Channel, Border and Granada) had last minute changes to their schedule meaning that the episode intended for these dates were in fact screened on the next usual day instead.

ITV Region in start date order	End of Year Episode Numbers		
ITV Region in start date order	1993	1994	1995
Central Television	Completed	Completed	Completed
HTV West & Wales	1338	1396	Completed
Carlton Television formerly Thames	1233	1396	Completed
Granada Television	1396	Completed	Completed
Border Television	1396	Completed	Completed
Grampian Television	1204 on 9/12 possibly another 6 more on 14/12, 15/12, 16/12 21/12, 22/12 and 23/12	1396	Completed
Ulster Television	292	360	Incomplete
Meridian Broadcasting formerly TVS	1396	Completed	Completed
Anglia Television	1???	1354	1396
Tyne Tees Television	1???	1396	Completed
Westcountry Television formerly TSW	???	980 on 20/12/94	Incomplete on 1101
Channel Television	1396	Completed	Completed but skipped a chunk
Yorkshire Television (YTV)	1???	1396	Completed but skipped a major chunk
Scottish Television (STV)	Never shown	Never shown	Never shown

=== New Zealand ===
In New Zealand, The Young Doctors was aired on TV2. On Monday 22 February 1982, the first episode was broadcast at 5.30pm. From 19 July 1982, it was moved to the 6pm slot. To make way for Sons and Daughters, the series was moved from 6pm to a 'double episode' format at 6.30pm on a Tuesday and Wednesday evening from 11 February 1986. It reverted to half hour, weekday episodes in the 5.15pm slot from 4 August until 12 December 1986, and then to double episodes in the 5.05-5.55pm slot from 15 December 1986 until 6 February 1987. From 9 February 1987, the series was moved to TV One and reverted to half hour episodes at 5.15pm. The final episode was broadcast on Wednesday 27 May 1987.

== Remake ==
In November 2007, the Nine Network announced plans to remake the series in conjunction with FremantleMedia. Originally, it was set to be broadcast in 2008 but due to script delays, the premiere date had been pushed back to 2009. The remake was set to be named Young Doctors (minus "The"). However, at the end of 2008, the Nine Network officially passed on the idea. The network decided against the remake, instead, confirming a second series of the popular Australian drama Underbelly. FremantleMedia is currently searching for another television station to contract the programme.

== Home media ==
Selected episodes of the serial were released on DVD in October 2006, under the title of The Best Romances. A second set of selected episodes, under the title of Classic Cliffhangers, was released in February 2008. In 1994, prior to the DVDs, a VHS was edited in the UK by "NTV entertainment" collecting episodes A, B (pilots) & 1.

On 16 June 2021, ViaVision Entertainment released the first 250 episodes of the series in a 35 disc set which consisted of all episodes screened in 1976 and 1977.

Title	Format	Ep #	Discs/Tapes	Region 4 (Australia)	Special features	Distributors
The Young Doctors	VHS	3	1	1994	None	
The Young Doctors: 30th Anniversary	DVD	12	2	6 November 2006	Reunion Audio Commentary Stills Gallery Umbrella Trailers	Umbrella Entertainment
The Young Doctors: Classic Cliffhangers	DVD	12	2	2 February 2008	Audio Commentary Umbrella Trailers	Umbrella Entertainment
The Young Doctors Collection 1	DVD	1-250	35	16 June 2021	Reunion; Ada's cookbook	ViaVision Entertainment
