= Babs McMillan =

Australian actress

- Born: Australia
- Occupations: Actress; director; playwright; teacher
- Years active: 1970-present

Babs McMillan is an Australian stage, film, television actress and director, playwright and teacher, based in Melbourne She is best known for her roles in two popular television series during the 1980s.

== Career ==
McMillan played the acerbic Sister Erin Cosgrove during the final year of television series The Young Doctors and dimwitted country bumpkin Cass Parker in Prisoner. In the late 1990s, she appeared in the Australian espionage drama Secrets.

McMillan has appeared in the movies Oscar and Lucinda (1997), Babe: Pig in the City (1998), My Brilliant Career (1979) and Hating Alison Ashley (2005).

On stage McMillan has acted extensively with the Melbourne Theatre Company. Apart from acting, McMillan has helped many students as Director of Drama at the National Theatre Drama School in Melbourne. Was resident director for the "BUDDY – The Buddy Holly story" 1991–1992.

In May 2024, McMillian appeared in Rootless Cosmopolitan.

== Filmography ==
=== Film ===
Year	Title	Role	Notes
1979	My Brilliant Career	Miss Benson	
1982	A Shifting Dreaming	Annie Lock	Television film documentary
1991	Deadly	Coroner	
1997	Oscar and Lucinda	Mrs. Judd	
1998	Babe: Pig in the City	Matriarch	
2005	Hating Alison Ashley	Mrs. Orlando	
2009	Chocolate Fetish	Prue Kaiser	Short film
2013	Cliffy	Merle	Television film
2024	The Honeysuckle Sisters	Coach	Film

=== Television ===
Year	Title	Role	Notes
1974	Silent Number	The Prostitute	Episode: "Something from the Past"
1975	The Dick Emery Show		Episode: "Episode #14.10"
1977	Doctor on the Go	Nerida	Episode: "Sunday Bleeping Sunday"
1979	Skyways	Moira Trimmer	Episode: "Chalk and Cheese"
1981	Prisoner	Miss Vaughan	Season 3 (guest, 1 episode)
1983–84	Prisoner	Cass Parker	Season 5–6 (main, 60 episodes)
1983	The Young Doctors	Erin Cosgrove	8 episodes
1984	Special Squad		Episode: "Return of the Cat"
1989	Rafferty's Rules	Nurse McTaggart	Episode: "The Plague"
1993	Secrets	Virginia Drury	13 episodes
1995	Good Morning Australia	Guest – Herself	TV series, 1 episode
2002	Short Cuts	Miri Lieberman	Episode: "As a Row of Tents"
2002	Legacy of the Silver Shadow	Nursing Home Manager	Episode: "Tomorrow the World"
2009	City Homicide	Fran Benson	Episode: "The Forgotten"
2023	Celebrity House Cleaner	Sheila	2 episodes
2023	Talking Prisoner	Herself	Podcast (episode 58, 13 September 2023)
