= Peter Lochran =

Australian actor

- Born: 14 September 1955 (age 71); Queensland, Australia
- Notable work: Peter Holland in The Young Doctors

Comedy career
- Medium: Television actor

Peter Lochran (born 14 September 1955 in Queensland, Australia) is an actor, who remains best known for his role as Dr. Peter Holland in the television soap opera The Young Doctors. Prior to acting he was a radio station panel operator at 3AW in Melbourne, Australia.

After appearing in The Young Doctors from 1978 to 1982 he moved to the United States where he continued his soap career with roles in Another World and Capitol.
