= Secrets (Australian TV series) =

Australian television series

Secrets is an Australian television series which screened in 1993 on the ABC. The thirteen part series was centred around "FIRM", a small, secret, government agency dealing with national security in a world where the old lines defining enemies and allies are now blurred. The perils of international organised crime and terrorist group activity have raised the stakes higher than ever before.

Secrets was created by Jay Cook and Peter Gawler, produced by Jill Robb. It was written by Tony Morphett, Graeme Koetsveld, Deborah Cox, Everett De Roche, Tony Kavanagh, Glenda Hambly, John Cundill and Jay Cook. It was directed by Mark Callan, Steve Jodrell, Gary Conway and Kendal Flanagan.

== Cast ==
- Frank Whitten as Tom Jacobs
- Babs McMillan as Virginia Drury
- Tony Poli as Ed Casser
- Michael Fry as David Skelton
- Rachel Griffiths as Sarah Foster
- Marshall Napier as Gary O'Leary
- Helen Buday
- Nadine Garner

== See also ==
- List of Australian television series
