= Alan Coleman =

- Born: Alan James Coleman; 28 December 1936; Castle Bromwich, Birmingham, England
- Died: 10 December 2013 (aged 76); Central Coast, New South Wales, Australia
- Occupations: Television producer; writer; director; actor
- Years active: Early 1960s-2009
- Employer(s): Associated Television (in the United Kingdom), Reg Grundy Organisation
- Known for: Crossroads; Neighbours; The Young Doctors; Shortland Street
- Spouse: Barbara Coleman
- Children: 3

Alan James Coleman (28 December 1936 – 10 December 2013) was an England-born Australian television series producer, screenwriter, director and former actor, active in his native United Kingdom as well as in Australia and New Zealand.

== Biography ==
Coleman was born in Birmingham, West Midlands, England, he worked at Associated Television, in the United Kingdom where he served as the head of children's programming, before becoming the first director of the British drama series Crossroads, after which he emigrated to Australia in 1974, where he worked on numerous soap operas including medical drama The Young Doctors which he also created, as well as Prisoner (known also internationally as Prisoner: Cell Block H) and Neighbours, he also worked in New Zealand on drama Shortland Street.

In 1997, he directed several episodes of the British soap opera, Family Affairs as a part of a working holiday in the UK. At one point, he also temporarily parted company with the Reg Grundy Organisation production stable to establish his own company, which provided television coverage of major sporting events. Before going behind the camera, he originally worked as an actor and is on record as saying that "you cannot be a good director unless you have acted yourself".

Coleman's autobiography, One Door Shuts, was self-published through Trafford Publishing in 2009.

== Personal life ==
Coleman was married to Barbara (deceased). He had three children; Nick, Chris (deceased) and Jacqui.

Coleman died on 10 December 2013 on the Central Coast in New South Wales. His agent, Darren Gray, stated "Alan was a very special man. He launched so many careers both in front of and behind the camera, was behind so many hit shows and gave pleasure through his work to audiences around the world. He pioneered the art form viewers refer to as the soap opera but to him the shows were always five nights a week, fast turn-around drama serials."

== Honour ==
In 2008, Coleman was presented with the inaugural "Lifetime Achievement Award" for his outstanding contribution to the 'soap opera' industry at The Soap Shows- Aussie Soap Awards.
