= Frances Hargreaves =

Australian actress (1954–2017)

- Hargreaves in 1975, aged 19 as Marilyn McDonald in TV series Number 96
- Born: 6 January 1955; South Africa
- Died: 3 March 2017 (aged 62); Sydney, Australia
- Occupation: Actress
- Known for: The Young Doctors, Number 96 as Marilyn McDonald

Frances Hargreaves (6 January 1955 – 3 March 2017) was a South African-born British Australian actress, after working as a theatre actress in England, she became famous in Australia the mid-1970s through her role of Marilyn McDonald, the adopted daughter of Reg and Edie (Mummy andD addy) in the television soap opera Number 96, and appearing in smaller roles in the international hit television series The Young Doctors as Emma Dixon and in E Street

== Early life ==
Hargreaves was born in South Africa, of British descent and she had studied in London,

== Career ==
Hargreaves began her acting career in theatre in the UK. After marrying Australian actor and singer David Gilchrist, they settled in Australia in 1973. Their daughter Amelia was born in 1989.

In January 1974, Hargreaves scored the role in Number 96 as rebellious teenager Marilyn McDonald after the original actress who was cast in the role Judy McBurney had to withdraw after only six episodes due to peritonitis,. Hargreaves had to re-shoot all of McBurney's scenes. Marilyn was the adopted daughter of Edie and Reg (Mike Dorsey and Wendy Blacklock), whom she always called "Mummy and Daddy" and was primarily a comedy character, but her most dramatic storyline was when she discovered the identity of the infamous Number 96 pantyhose strangler. Hargreaves left the series in June 1975 when she fell pregnant.

During a subsequent visit to her native South Africa with newborn son Samuel David, she acted in theatre productions of The Sound of Music, Stop the World I Want to Get Off and Cinderella.

She subsequently returned to Australia and resumed her role in Number 96 from April 1977 until its demise later that year.

She later appeared in The Young Doctors as Emma Dixon in 1979 and Who Killed Baby Azaria? (1984) and the serial E Street

In 2007 Hargreaves appeared in the retrospective program Where Are They Now? with fellow Number 96 cast members for a reunion special.

== Death ==
Frances Hargreaves died in Sydney, New South Wales on 3 March 2017, aged 62, after a long unspecified illness.

== Filmography ==
=== Film ===
Year	Title	Role	Type
1984	Who Killed Baby Azaria?		Documentary film

=== Television ===
Year	Title	Role	Type
1975	Behind the Legend	Lucy	(TV series)
1975–75 1977	Number 96	Marilyn McDonald Bordello	TV series
1979	The Young Doctors	Emma Dixon	TV series
1982	Metal Mickey	Phyllis	
1991	E Street	Heather Spencer	TV series
2007	Where Are They Now?	Herself (with cast of Number 96)	TV series

== Theatre ==
Year	Title	Role	Location / Venue
1975	The Sound of Music		
1975	Stop the World I Want to Get Off		
1977	The Gold Rush; Or the Corruption of Dickie	Araballa	The Speakeasy, Sydney with J.K. James Productions
1986	Cinderella	Cinderella	Glen Street Theatre, Sydney
