= Willie Fennell =

Australian actor

Willie Fennell OAM
- Born: William John Fennell; 20 January 1920; Bondi, New South Wales, Australia
- Died: 9 September 1992 (aged 72); Sydney, Australia
- Other name: "Phooey" Fennell
- Occupations: Actor; comedian; producer; scriptwriter; soldier

William John Fennell (20 January 1920 – 9 September 1992) was an Australian radio, television (serials and mini-series), stage and film actor, comedian, producer, radio scriptwriter and writer who appeared in many Australian television series in a lengthy career spanning over 50 years, recognised by his slightly nasal, raspy voice, moustache and pork pie hat. As a comedian, his style was stated as a sad humour worth more than a belly-laugh and said to be contrasted with the blue comedy of contemporary performer Roy Rene.

He is probably best known for his recurring role in TV series The Young Doctors as Arthur Simmonds and Sons and Daughters as Spider Webb.

== Biography ==
=== Early life ===
Fennell was born to William Hugh Fennell, a vocational trainer, and his wife Alma Doris (née Tie). Prior to his performance career he found employment as a travelling salesman, he pursued interests in scriptwriting, tap dancing, radio entertaining and comedy theatre, before World War II beckoned, he served with Citizen Military Forces and then the Australian Imperial Force. After being promoted to sergeant he was discharged, on 28 April 1944, taking a position with the Department of Civil Aviation Civil Aviation Force. He started appearing in theatre roles from 1947.

== Writing career/stage and radio ==
He became interested in scriptwriting and wrote a radio program based on the comic strip characters Blondie and Dagwood. As character Phooey Fennell, a BBC race caller he started appearing on radio programs and scripted and starred in the popular radio series Life With Dexter during the 1950s and 1960s, which ran for more than 500 episodes and was also sold to New Zealand and South Africa radio, and also wrote a series of books collecting the scripts of the radio show including Life with Dexter, Dexter Loses His Head, Dexter Sings, More Life with Dexter, My Third Life with Dexter, The Desert Island Wreckers, Dexter's Court, Dexter's Fit, Dexter Gets the Point, Car-razy Life with Dexter, Dexter and Ashleigh Muddle On and Dexter Detects. Fennell also wrote a book of poetry and humorous sketches entitled Mad Stuff.

== Television, stage and film ==
Fennell became a notable character actor, when television was introduced to Australia, whilst appearing in numerous stage productions, most notably Alan Seymour's The One Day of the Year.

Film roles included Cathy's Child, Hoodwink and the mini-series A Fortunate Life. On television, he was well known for roles in the 1970s and 1980s, including Jeremiah Quizzel in The Lost Islands, Arthur Simmonds on a recurring basis in The Young Doctors from 1976 to 1978, and Sons and Daughters as Spider Webb in the mid-1980s. He regularly appeared in A Country Practice in various roles, most especially as Skeeter Martin. He appeared in G.P., Chopper Squad, The Flying Doctors and Mother and Son.

Fennell was awarded the Medal of the Order of Australia (OAM) in 1991 for "service to the entertainment industry".

Actor Geoffrey Rush praised Fennell as an early influence.

== Personal life ==
On 30 November 1946 Fennell married Joy Therese Hawkins, divorcing her in 1975. He was the father of Susan Fennell and Jane Fennell, best known as "Miss Jane" on the Australian children's television show Mr. Squiggle.

== Filmography ==
=== Film ===
Year	Title	Role	Type
1969	Little Jungle Boy	Dr. Barney O' Hara	TV movie
1973	...And Millions Die!	Sid Broomberg	TV movie
1976	Caddie	Doctor 2	Feature film
1976	Do I Have to Kill My Child?	Rob	TV movie
1979	Cathy's Child	The Australian Counsel	Feature film
1980	The Earthling	R. C.	Feature film
1980	Maybe This Time	Mr. Todd	Feature film
1981	Hoodwink	Bank Manager	Feature film
1982	Deadline	Old Alf	TV movie
1982	Ginger Meggs	Walter Fotheringay	Feature film
1983	Pretty Petrol	Everett Quince	TV movie
1984	Stanley (aka Stanley: Every Home Should Have One)	Herb the Fisherman	Feature film
1987	The Place at the Coast	Fred Ryan	Feature film
1990	More Winners: Mr Edmund	Mr. Lindstead	TV movie
1992	Greenkeeping	Old Player	Feature film
1993	Reckless Kelly	Mr. Arnold	Feature film
1993	Shotgun Wedding		Feature film

=== Television ===
Year	Title	Role	Type
1966	Australian Playhouse	Rosa's father	TV series
1966-67	Nice 'n Juicy	Jack Hamlin	TV series
1967	Contrabandits	Don	TV series
1968	Homicide	2 roles	TV series
1969	News Revue	Various characters	TV series
1969	Riptide	3 roles	TV series
1969	The Rovers	Albert Pringle	TV series
1968-69	Skippy the Bush Kangaroo	3 roles	TV series
1970	Barrier Reef	Pilgrim	TV series
1972	Division 4	Henry Roberts	TV series
1972	Boney	Needle Kent	TV series
1972	Behind the Legend	Jim	TV series
1973	Spyforce	Brigenden-Smith	TV series
1974	The Evil Touch	Doc	TV series
1974	Mac and Merle	Basil Mc Inerney	TV series
1974	The Love Affair	Reg Bates	TV series
1975	The Seven Ages of Man	Terence Swanson	TV series
1975	Ben Hall	Piper	TV miniseries
1975	The Company Men		TV miniseries
1976	Luke's Kingdom	Shepherd	TV series, 13 episodes
1976	The Emigrants	Harry	TV miniseries
1976	The Lost Islands	Jeremiah Quizzel	TV series
1977	The Outsiders	Bob Ryder	TV series
1977-78	Kirby's Company	Santa	TV series
1978	Case for the Defence	Grandpa Harris	TV series
1978	Chopper Squad	Rodney Coombes	TV series
1978	Glenview High		TV series, episode: "The Siren"
1979	One Day Miller		TV series
1979	Skyways	Jack Harris	TV series
1977-79	The Young Doctors	Arthur Simmonds	TV series
1980	Spring and Fall	Bob	TV series
1980	Young Ramsay	Ed Carroll	TV series
1983	Cop Shop		TV series
1984	Special Squad	Sol Greenberg	TV series
1984	Carson's Law	Neville Childe	TV series
1986	A Fortunate Life	Old Man	TV miniseries
1985-86	Sons and Daughters	Arthur 'Spider' Webb	TV series
1988	Rafferty's Rules	Jim Stevens	TV series
1986-99	The Flying Doctors	2 roles	TV series
1990	Elly & Jools	Cec	TV miniseries
1982-90	A Country Practice		TV series
1991	The River Kings	Praying Jack	TV miniseries
1991	E Street	Noah	TV series
1992	Mother and Son	Pet shop Owner	TV series
1992	G.P.	Re Kirby	TV series
