= The Affairs of Peter Salem =

American radio detective drama series (1949–1953)

The Affairs of Peter Salem is an American radio detective drama that was broadcast on Mutual from April 25, 1949, or May 7, 1949, until April 18, 1953.

== Format ==
Peter Salem came from a small town but lived in the East 80s in New York City. Some neighbors considered him disreputable, possibly because of the strange clients who came looking for his help. He was a "suave and sophisticated private detective". With his sidekick, Marty, Salem avoided violence by using reasoning "to trip up sophisticated lawbreakers from the city."

The show's producer, Himan Brown described Salem as "a rather portly, affable bachelor for whom the comforts of life are first thoughts", particularly enjoying good food and relaxing in his easy chair. His clients provided enough funding for him to enjoy his gourmet tastes. Salem had "a violent dislike for strenuous exercising" and described himself as fat.

Santos Ortega portrayed Salem, and Jack Grimes played Marty. Other actors heard on the show included Ann Shepherd, Everett Sloane, and Luis Van Rooten.

== Production ==
In addition to Brown as the producer, Mende Brown was the director, and Louis Vittes was the writer. The Affairs of Peter Salem was initially broadcast on Monday evenings. On April 30, 1950, it was moved to Sunday evenings as part of a block of adventure and mystery programs on Mutual.

== Critical response ==
A review in the trade publication Variety noted "the slick performance of Santos Ortega". The supporting cast was described as "capable", and the reviewer added, "Script and direction were also okay."
