= Patrea Smallacombe =

Australian writer

- Born: 13 October 1958 (age 67); Adelaide, Australia
- Occupation: Soap opera writer
- Family: Betty Quin (aunt)

Patrea Smallacombe (born 13 October 1958, Adelaide, Australia) is an Australian writer and series script editor who contributed to numerous soap operas in 1986 and 1987 in her native Australia including The Young Doctors, Prisoner, Neighbours and A Country Practice before moving to the United Kingdom in 1987.

In the United Kingdom, she has written for many British television shows including Emmerdale, EastEnders, River City, Brookside, Family Affairs, The Bill, Casualty and also two separate stints penning scripts for the ITV1 soap opera, Coronation Street.

In 1989, she was the script editor for Yorkshire Television's viewer controlled soap opera, Hollywood Sports.

As of 2012, Smallacombe had joined the scriptwriting team of Hollyoaks.
