= Betty Quin =

Australian screenwriter

- Born: C. 1922/1923
- Died: 28 August 1993 (aged 70)
- Occupations: Playwright; scriptwriter; series script editor; actor; director; theatre operator
- Family: Patrea Smallacombe (niece)

Betty Quin (c. 1922/1923 - 28 August 1993) was an Australian playwright, script writer and series script editor who contributed to numerous soap operas in her native Australia (e.g. The Young Doctors, Sons and Daughters, A Country Practice, Prisoner and Neighbours).

From 1970 to 1977 she ran the Q Theatre Company, an amateur theatre company she co-founded with her husband, Don Quin, in Adelaide. Many of her 22 plays and other Australian works were performed by the company. Robert Stigwood purchased the film rights to her 1970 play, Dinkum Bambino, which had been favourably reviewed by The Advertiser's theatre critic, Mary Armitage.

She was the aunt of Patrea Smallacombe, the Australian-born script writer for Coronation Street and EastEnders.

Betty Quin died on 28 August 1993 at the age of 70.

== Works ==
=== Plays ===
- The Swallow Flies South, 1961
- A Relative Affair, 1962
- The Travelling Kind, 1962
- A Question of Time, 1963
- For Arts Sake, 1964
- The Listeners, 1967
- The Gentle Jigsaw, 1968
- Cry For The Moon, 1970
- Dinkum Bambino, 1970
- The Constant Gardener, c.1970
- Up the Track, 1973
- The Golden Years, 1977

=== Books ===
- Quin, Betty (1991), Prisoner Cell Block-H: a dangerous affair, Thames Mandarin, ISBN 978-0-7493-0930-5
