= Wendy Blacklock =

Australian actress (born 1932)

Wendy Blacklock AM
- Born: 20 January 1932 (age 94); Sydney, New South Wales, Australia
- Education: Conservartorium of Sydney, Rathbone Academy of Dramatic Art
- Occupations: Actress; comedienne; producer; writer; singer; dancer; choreographer; theatre entrepreneur
- Years active: 1947-2014
- Known for: Number 96 as Edith "Edie" McDonald; Founding the theatrical firm "Performing Lines" for the Australian Elizabethan Theatre Trust; Actress and producer with J. C. Williamson

Wendy Blacklock (born 20 January 1932)) is an Australian-born retired theatre actress and theatrical entrepreneur, radio and television actress, comedienne, producer, writer, singer, dancer and choreographer.

Blacklock has appeared in numerous performance roles, both in Australia and the United Kingdom alongside contemporaries such as Jill Perryman and has been referred to as "The Grand Dame of the Stage".

She remains best known, however, to local small screen audiences for her role as ditzy Edith "Edie" MacDonald, otherwise known as Mother or Mummy in the 1970s TV series Number 96 (TV series) alongside Mike Dorsey as her husband Reg and Frances Hargreaves as her adoptive daughter Marilyn.

The performing arts company PAC Australia named an award category The Wendy Blacklock Industry Legend Award, to honour Blacklock's legacy and contribution to the Australian entertainment industry.

== Biography ==
Blacklock was born on 20 January 1932 in Sydney, New South Wales to David Blacklock, manager of sports company Slazenger and Lillian Ava Miller, however, some early theatre records when working with the Newcastle-upon-Tyne repertory theatre company and travel records indicate a birth year of 1929 or 1930.

After finishing school she decided to become an actress and attended drama school, where she was education at The Conservatoriom of Sydney and The Rathbone Academy of Performing Arts.

Blacklock joined the Independent Theatre in 1947 and like most performers of the era travelled to England to start her career in theatre in the early 1950s, nothing that theatre in Australia was literally non-existent at that time and everything was primarily a copy of London West End and Broadway.

She performed in Newcastle-upon-Tyne in Repertory Theatre, and The Piar, before returning to Australia in the early 1960s as th beginning of the new-wave of theatre was in full string, and spent her formative years with J. C. Williamson alongside contemporary's, adding many local stories where becoming prominent wit such emerging playwrights as Thomas Keneally and David Williamson

She also started to take small screens roles in the latter 50s, and working on screen until the late 1970s, she remained active in stage roles and theatre producing her preferred genre for seven decades until the mid-2010s.

She founded the theatre company production firm Performing Lines for the Australian Elizabethan Theatre Trust and was instrumental in establishing Aboriginal Australian theatre internationally

However she became famous for her comic role in the TV soap opera Number 96 as Edith "Edie" McDonald.

Blacklock has two daughters Nicole and Lisa and at least two grandchildren.

Blacklock is a noted comedienne, she also toured England and worked in TV, appearing with luminaries such as Benny Hill and Bernard Bresslaw and also opposite Prunella Scales

== Television ==
Blacklock, always s preferred theatre and although was initially reluctant to go into a TV series, became famous for her role in the 1970s television soap opera Number 96 of comedy character dizzy Edith "Edie" MacDonald, at the time the series was the highest rated drama locally, and she joined the series in January 1974, alongside Mike Dorsey as her regimented husband Reg McDonald, who referred to her character as "Mother" and her adopted wayward teenage daughter Marilyn, played by Frances Hargreaves, who in turn referred to her as "Mummy" :

Edie, was a typical ditzy suburban 1970s housewife who hailed from Blacktown and had a fondness for gin, daytime soap operas and analgesics, the character became such popular and enduring comedy elements, there had been plans for a spin-off series in late 1976 based on the character's "Edie and Reg" called "Mummy and Me", the series was however not picked up by a Network, and she and Dorsey remained in Number 96, until it finished in August 1977, and she indeed spoke the final dialogue in the final episode.

Although the characters of Reg and Edie where enormously popular, much to the disappointment of fans, they never appeared in the feature film version

Umbrella Entertainment, released several DVDs of the series, showcasing several of the more iconic storyarc's, in which Blacklock, alongside creator and screenwriter David Sale and co-stars Sheila Kennelly and Elaine Lee recorded a commentary.

== Theatre career ==
Blacklock's acting career began on the stage and from 1947 and she is an inductee into the live performance Hall of Fame, she spent two years in England acting in repertory theatre, before returning to Australia where she had had a solid career in the theatre which have included stage tours both locally and in New Zealand; she was also a regular cast member of the satirical revues staged at Sydney's Phillip Street Theatre in the 1960s.

She has featured in numerous productions by such playwrights as David Williamson and Dorothy Hewett

Prior to the role in Number 96 she had played in theatrical productions of Don's Party and Who's Afraid of Virginia Woolf?, and when Spike Milligan toured Australia she appeared opposite him in a special televised production and took the title role in Pardon Miss Westcott since the late 1970s, post-Number 96 her career has been exclusively related to theatre, including a tour of stage version of British TV series George and Mildred, she has performed as an actress and theatre company entrepreneur until retiring in 2011!.

Blacklock, is also a theatrical entrepreneur who founded the "Australian Content Department" in 1982 association the renowned Australian Elizabethan Theatre Trust, and subsequently in 1990 the company Performing Lines an arts producer and presenter company, with the aim of coaching and showcasing new productions and training artists for stage. Her small theatre museum includes images of the alumni of the theatre world including Barry Humphries, Jill Perryman, Graham Kennedy, Gordon Chater and her Number 96 co-star Carol Raye

=== Theatre Productions by Performing Lines ===
- The Cake Man by Robert J. Merritt - tour of Colorado, United States
- The Theft of Sita
- The Seven Stages of Grieving by Wesley Enoch and Deborah Mailman
- Shadows and Objects, for Meditation
- Wolf Lullaby by Hilary Bell
- Same Same But Different
- Chooked Dancers in Wrong Skin

== Other TV roles ==
Although a staple of theatre, she appeared in numerous TV roles, including guest parts in police procedural series Homicide and Boney and had been a presenter on children's show Play School and had a role on Skippy the Bush Kangaroo, and during 1977 occasionally featured as a panellist on the game show Blankety Blanks

== Filmography ==
Year	title	Role	
1957	Pantomime Quiz	Guest (as herself)	
1959	Pardon Miss Westcott (TV movie)	Elizabeth Westcott	
1959	Pardon Miss Westcott (soundtrack)	Performer "Send for Me"; I'm on My Way,/br >HowCould i See; You Walked By	
1965	TV Spells Magic	Herself - Guest with Max Meldrum, Ron Shand, Queenie Ashton, Evie Hayes, David Copping, Kevin Miles, Gwen Plumb, Chips Rafferty, Ruth Cracknell & Keith Petersen	TV special
1967	Australian Playhouse	unknown	
1968	Play School	Herself as Presenter	
1970	Skippy the Bush Kangaroo	Hattie McDougall	
1970	Homicide	Ann "Aunty" Turner	
1971	The Comedy Game	Herself	
1972	Carry on Spike in Australia	Herself (TV special)	
1972	Boney	Janet Asworth	
1974	Me and Merle	Guest	
1974–1977	Number 96	Edie "Mummy", "Mother" McDonald 227 episodes	
1976	The 1976 Annual TV Week Logie Awards	Herself - Audience member with 'Number 96' cast: Mike Dorsey, Chard Hayward, Jeff Kevin, Bunney Brooke & Frances Hargreaves	TV Special
1976	The Celebrity Game	Herself	
1977	Blankety Blanks	Panellist	
1977; 1978	The Mike Walsh Show	Guest - Herself with Mike Dorsey	TV series, 1 episode
1977	Number 96: The Final Night	Herself with cast	TV series, 1 episode
1978; 1979	The Mike Walsh Show	Guest - Herself	TV series, 1 episode
1978	The Peter Couchman Show	Guest - Herself	TV series, 1 episode
1979; 1980	The Mike Walsh Show	Guest - Herself	TV series, 1 episode
1980	The Mike Walsh Show	Guest - Herself with Dave Allenby	TV series, 1 episode
2006	Number 96...The Final Years DVD "96 special" (Number 96 DVD release)	commentary	

== Theatre roles ==
Blacklock, a theatre entrepreneur, appeared in stage productions from 1954 to 2014. Source = AusStage For further information: see Wendy Blacklock Theatre

Production	Playwright
Dear Charles	Alan Melville
Two to One	
Around the Loop	
The Happiest Days of Your Life	John Dighton
Cinderella	
Phillip Street Revue
Mistress Money	
The Playboy of the Western World	John Millington Synge
The Rage	
Who's Afraid of Virginia Woolf?	Edward Albee
Revue at the Loo	
Spring and Port Wine	Bill Naughton
Gone Potty	
The Prince and the Firebird	
The Hostage	
Dick Whittington	
An Awful Rose	
Don's Party	David Williamson
Bon-Bons and Roses for Dolly	
Habeas Corpus	Alan Bennett
Incompletions	
George and Mildred	
Blood of the Lamb	
Corporal Mime Theatre Workshops	
Face Value	David Hwang
Bingo UNIT	

== Recognition, honours and awards ==
In 1992, Blacklock became a Member of the Order of Australia for her Service to the Arts.

The Wendy Blacklock Industry Legend Award was created and named in her honour in 2022 by PAC Australia.

=== Helpmann Awards ===
The Helpmann Awards is an awards show, celebrating live entertainment and performing arts in Australia, presented by industry group Live Performance Australia (LPA) since 2001. In 2003, Blacklock received the JC Williamson Award, the LPA's highest honour, for her life's work in live performance.

Year	Nominee / work	Award	Result
2003	Herself	JC Williamson Award	awarded
