= Judy McBurney =

Australian actress

- Born: Judith McBurney; 19 May 1948; Sydney, New South Wales, Australia
- Died: 1 December 2018 (aged 70); Sydney, New South Wales, Australia
- Occupations: Actress; model
- Years active: 1968–2002
- Known for: The Young Doctors as Tania Livingstone; Prisoner as Sandra "Pixie" Mason

Judith McBurney (19 May 1948 – 1 December 2018) was an Australian actress and model. She is best known for serial The Young Doctors in 1,300 episodes as Tania Livingstone and also appeared in cult series Prisoner as Sandra" Pixie" Mason in 96 episodes.

== Early career ==
Before acting, McBurney started a successful career as a model employed by June Dally-Watkins. One of her first acting roles was in late 1969, in a supporting role in Peter Weir's short movie Michael, one of three short movies released under the title Three to Go. It followed by small parts in ABC TV-plays and guest roles in other TV series. Her first leading role was in 1972 as Ella Belairs in ABC's adaption of The Cousin from Fiji, based on a novel by Norman Lindsay. Another early and memorable role was as Aldith in Seven Little Australians.

== Television soap operas ==
In late 1973, McBurney was cast in the role of key new character Marilyn McDonald in Number 96 but before any of her scenes had gone to air and with about 30 scenes in the can she had to withdraw from the role due to illness. This left her replacement, Frances Hargreaves, to reshoot all of McBurney's scenes.

McBurney then went into the ongoing role of plain-Jane secretary Jane Fowler in The Box in late 1975, and later played the brief role of Jodi in Number 96. Subsequently, she became immensely popular playing the part of nurse Tania Livingston in The Young Doctors. She played the role from 1977 until the series ended in 1982. She followed this with another popular character, that of breezy romantic Sandra "Pixie" Mason in Prisoner for 96 episodes. She played Pixie on a recurring basis from 1983 to 1985. In later years she appeared in a few episodes of Always Greener.

McBurney was also famous for her voice-over work and also starring in commercials, in particular a very cheeky, controversial ad from the 1980s for Palmolive Gold, in which she features in a bed with actor Peter Mochrie. McBurney leaves a cake of soap under his pillow, which led to the famous jingle and saying "Don't wait to be told".

== Personal life and death ==
McBurney retired from acting in 2002 to become an educated healer. She also went on to teach modelling and acting for young people. McBurney died of cancer on 1 December 2018.

== Filmography ==
=== Film ===
Title	Year	Role	Type
Three to Go	1971	Judy (segment "Michael")	Feature film
Scobie Malone (aka Murder at the Opera House)	1975	Girl at Pedestrian Crossing	Feature film

=== Television ===
Year	Title	Role	Type
1970	Eden House	Role unknown	ABC Teleplay
1970	Chimes at Midnight	Role unknown	ABC Teleplay
1970	Barrier Reef	Guest role: Annette Conway	TV series, 1 episode
1971	What For Marianne?	Role unknown	TV movie
1972	Catwalk	Guest role: Marit Schemmler	TV series, 1 episode
1972	The Cousin From Fiji	Recurring role: Ella	TV series
1973	Seven Little Australians	Recurring role: Aldith	ABC TV series, 3 episodes
1975	Behind The Legend	Guest role: Waitress	ABC TV series, 1 episode
1975; 1975	Ben Hall	Guest role: Alison Buchanan	ABC TV series, 1 episode
1975–1976	Bellbird	Recurring role	ABC TV series, 152 episodes
1975	Ben Hall	Guest role: Rebecca	ABC TV series, 1 episode
1976	The Box	Guest role: Jane Fowler	TV series, 1 episode
1976; 1976	Homicide	Guest role: Yvette	TV series, 1 episode
1976	Homicide	Guest role: Joan Thompson	TV series, 1 episode
1976	Bluey	Janey	TV Pilot, episode 1: "The First Bloody Day"
1977	Bluey	Recurring Guest role: Sandra Gibson	TV sereies, 2 episodes
1977	Number 96	Guest role: Jodi	TV series, 2 episodes
1977–1983	The Young Doctors	Regular role: Tania Livingston/Nurse Tania Livingston/Sister Tania Livingston	TV series, 1329 episodes
1983–1985	Prisoner	Regular role: Sandra 'Pixie' Mason	TV series, 96 episodes
1984	A Country Practice	Guest role: Samantha Harrison	TV series, 2 episodes
1993	Home and Away	Guest role: Audrey Orchard	TV series, 1 episode
2002	Always Greener	Guest role: Yvonne Greenhill	TV series, 2 episodes
