= Little Jungle Boy =

- Written by: Mende Brown
- Directed by: Mende Brown
- Starring: Rahman Rahmin
- Music by: Laurie Lewis
- Country of origin: Australia
- Original language: English

Production
- Producer: Mende Brown
- Cinematography: Brendan Brown
- Editor: Jackie Poynter
- Running time: 90 minutes
- Production companies: Mass-Brown Pictures; Artransa Park Films

Original release
- Network: Seven Network
- Release: 28 August 1970

Little Jungle Boy is a 1970 Australian television film.

== Plot ==
Doctors at a research centre in South East Asia discover a boy who appears to have grown up wild in the jungle. The boy faces hostility from people who want to kidnap him and a treacherous witchdoctor. Eventually the boy returns to the jungle.

== Cast ==
- Rahman Rahmin as Momman
- Mike Dorsey as Doctor Mike Martin
- Niki Huen as Doctor Niki Sung
- Michael Pate as the Sultan
- Noel Ferrier as Father John
- Willie Fennell as Dr Barney O'Hara
- Les Berryman

== Production ==
The film was financed by an American company seeking product for the US TV market and Artransa Film Studios. Shooting took place short after their first Australian film. Strange Holiday (1970), partly on location in Singapore and Malaysia, as well as Artransa Studios in Sydney.

== Reception ==
The movie returned a comfortable profit to its investors.
