= Mr. Squiggle =

1959–1999 Australian TV children's TV series

- Also known as: Mr. Squiggle and Friends
- Genre: Children's television
- Created by: Norman Hetherington
- Presented by: Gina Curtis; Patricia Lovell; Jane Fennell; Roxanne Kimmorley; Rebecca Hetherington
- Voices of: Norman Hetherington
- Country of origin: Australia
- Original language: English
- No. of seasons: 41
- No. of episodes: 2,788

Production
- Running time: Varied between 5-100 minutes

Original release
- Network: ABC
- Release: 1 July 1959 – 9 July 1999

Mr. Squiggle (originally also known as Mr. Squiggle and Friends) is an Australian children's television series, and the name of the title character from that ABC show. The show was presented on television in many formats, between its inception on 1 July 1959 and 1999, from five-minute slots to a one-and-a-half-hour variety show featuring other performers, and has had several name changes, originally airing as Mr. Squiggle and Friends. At its height, the program was one of the most popular children's programs in Australia and toured theatre and conventions, entertaining several generations who grew with the program. It became one of the longest-running children's programs on Australian television, despite originally having only been asked to fill a six week gap on the ABC's schedule.

== History ==
Mr. Squiggle, the central character was created by cartoonist and puppeteer Norman Hetherington OAM, and the character first appeared on the Children's TV Club on ABC TV, but was spun off into his own programme which first aired on 1 July 1959. Hetherington voiced and operated all of the show's puppets, while his wife Margaret wrote the scripts.

The basic premise of the show remained the same: children wrote in with their "squiggles" and Mr. Squiggle would turn them into recognisable drawings by connecting lines with his pencil nose. More often than not, the picture would be drawn upside down (Hetherington manipulated the puppet from above by viewing the drawing upside down), and then Mr. Squiggle would gleefully declare, "Upside down! Upside down!"—asking his assistant to turn the picture the right way up and reveal the completed drawing. Every child whose "squiggle" was used on the show was sent a letter from Mr Squiggle himself. According to one interview, one little girl even sent Hetherington three handkerchiefs for Christmas.

External images
- Photograph of Norman Hetherington's original "Mr. SQUIGGLE" model. Source: National Archives of Australia
- Photograph of Norman Hetherington's original "Mr. SQUIGGLE" model, from the front, waving. Source: National Archives of Australia
- Photograph of Norman Hetherington's original "Mr. SQUIGGLE" model, from the side, waving. Source: National Archives of Australia
- Norman Hetherington's 1962 application to register the Copyright for the "Mr. SQUIGGLE" puppet. Source: National Archives of Australia
- Mr SQUIGGLE Costume, used at the "Journey of a Nation" Centenary of Federation parade, Sydney, Australia, 2000. Source: Powerhouse Museum

The last episode went to air just over 40 years after the first, on 9 July 1999. The last episode was produced in 1997; however, it was not until 2001 that the contract with the ABC concluded. After the show ceased production, the entire cast of puppets from Mister Squiggle and Friends were owned by the show's creator, Norman Hetherington. They have been loaned for display at exhibitions, such as at the National Film and Sound Archive and as part of the "50 Years of TV" exhibition at the Australian Centre for the Moving Image in 2007. Hetherington and his puppets appeared on the ABC TV series Collectors in 2010. In 2005 the Mosman Art Gallery hosted a major exhibition on the art and life of Norman Hetherington called "Mr Squiggle, Who’s Pulling the Strings". It included an envelope that a child had addressed to "Mr Squiggle, The Moon", which was delivered to the show.

== Characters ==
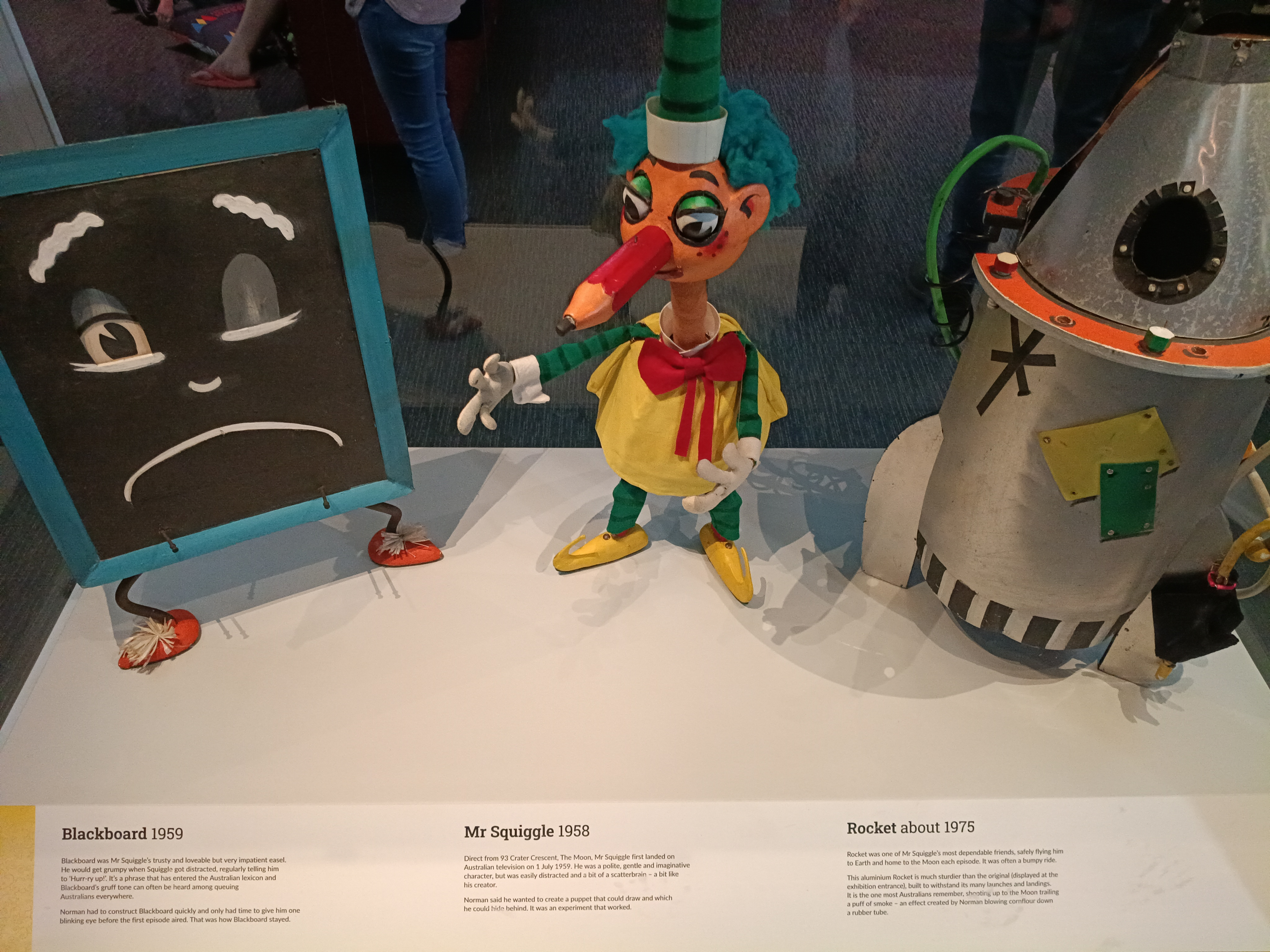
Mr Blackboard (1959), Mr Squiggle (1958) and Rocket (c. 1975), displayed at Newcastle Museum in 2026.

- Mr. Squiggle - Mr. Squiggle, the central character is a marionette with a pencil for a nose, who visits his friends from his home at 93 Crater Crescent on the Moon, flying to Earth in his pet rocket (named Rocket). In every episode he would create several pictures from "squiggles" sent in by children from around the country. Mr. Squiggle is a cheery, gentle and good-natured yet scatter-brained character who is often distracted and occasionally goes for "space-walks", leading his assistant to calm him down and get him to focus on the task of drawing.

=== Other characters ===
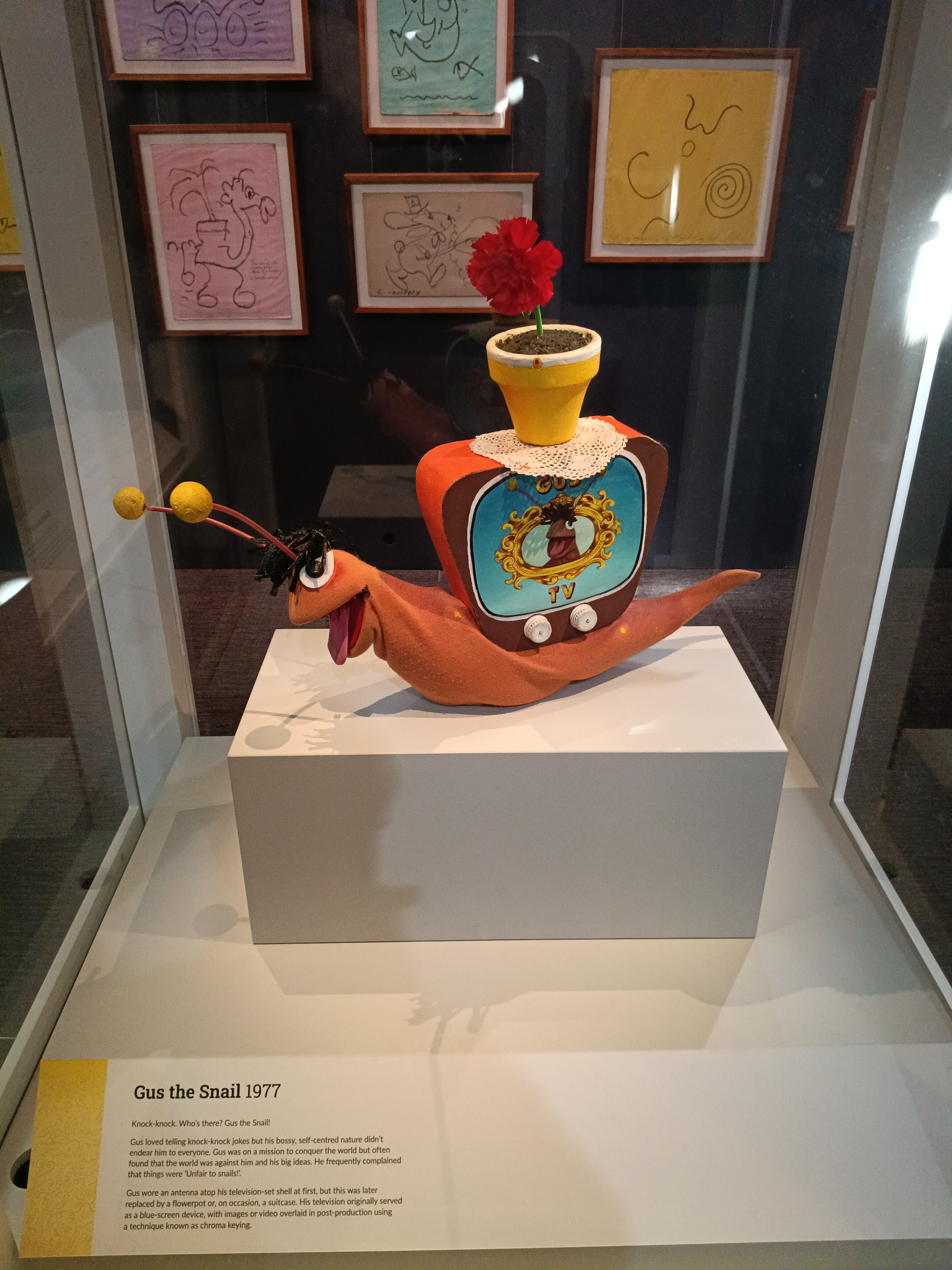
Gus the Snail puppet (1977).

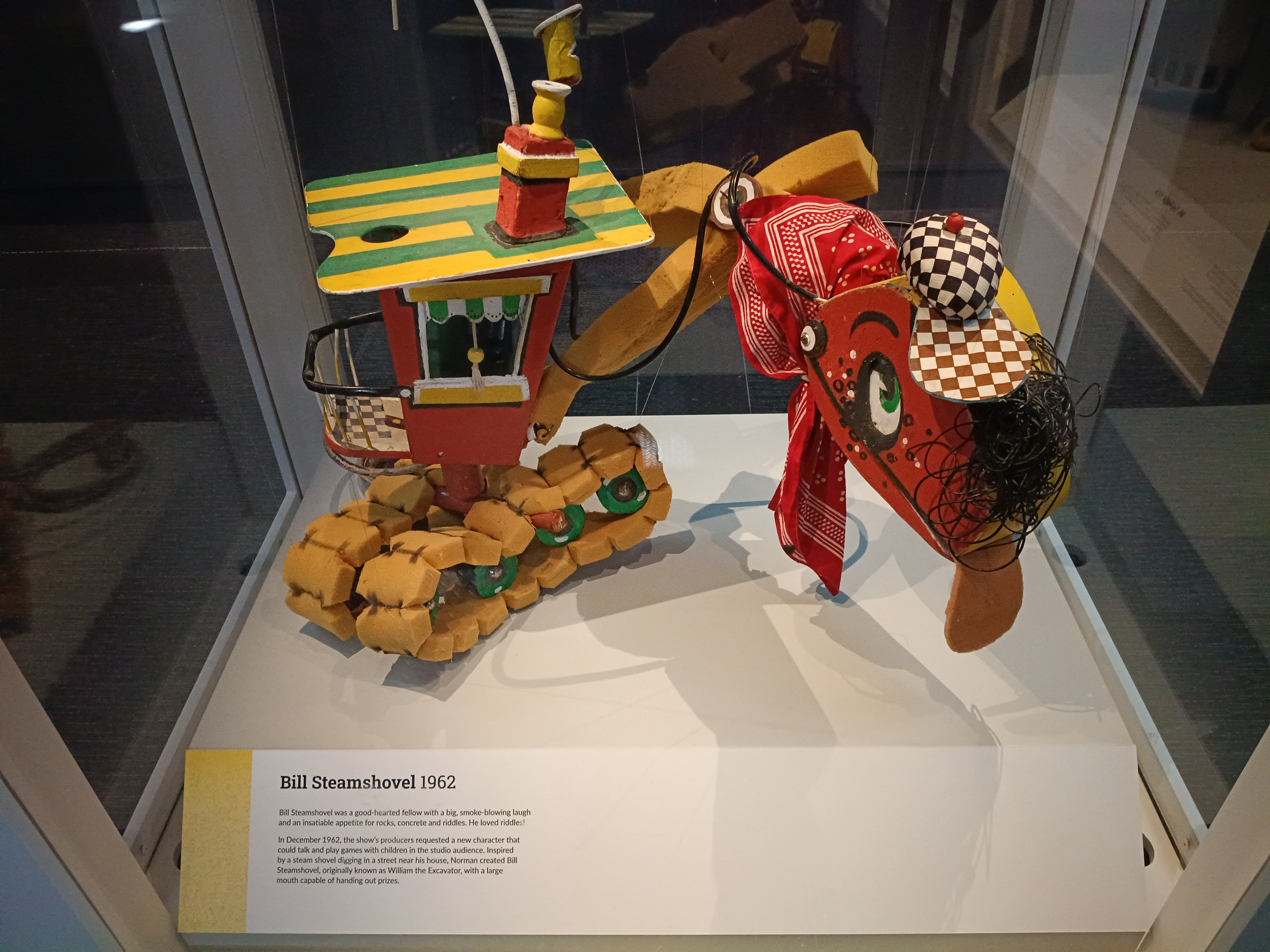
Bill Steamshovel puppet (1962).

Other puppet characters that appeared in the show included:

- Blackboard, the grumpy blackboard that Mr. Squiggle uses for an easel, whose catchphrases are "Hurry up", "Hmmph", "Double hmmph" and “Boringgg"
- Gus the Snail, who had a TV for a shell and later, a flower pot, often tells knock-knock jokes.
- Bill the Steam Shovel, who likes to tell corny jokes (often in the form of riddles) and belch steam (talcum powder) out of his "nose" when he laughs.

=== Assistants ===
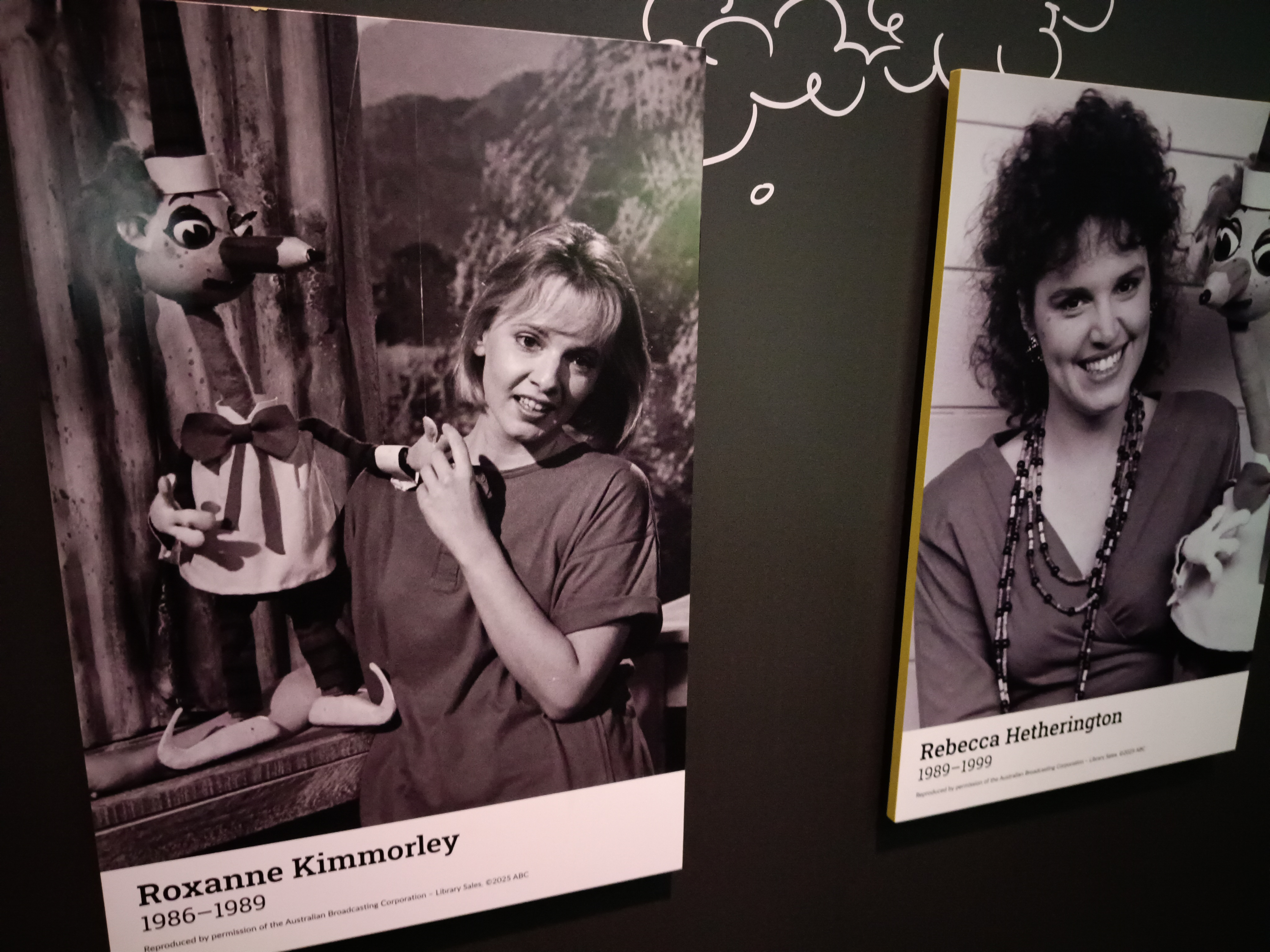
Photographs of assistants Roxanne Kimmorley and Rebecca Hetherington, exhibited at Newcastle Museum in 2026.

Mr. Squiggle was helped by a human assistant in all of the show's incarnations; they included Miss Gina (Gina Curtis), Miss Pat (Pat Lovell), Miss Jane (Jane Fennell), and later series featured Roxanne (Roxanne Kimmorley) and Rebecca (Rebecca Hetherington, Hetherington's daughter). In his first incarnation as Mr. Jolly Squiggle on the Children's TV Club his assistant was Miss Faith (Faith Linton).

=== Guest cast ===
Comedian Mikey Robins played one of the show's characters, Reg Linchpin, for a year from 1989 to 1990. Other notable guest performers on the show included actor Paul Chubb and magician Timothy Hyde.

== Commemorated ==
In February 2019 the Royal Australian Mint released a series of two dollar coins to mark the 60th anniversary of the first broadcast of the programme. The coins feature images of Squiggle himself, Gus the Snail, Bill the Steam Shovel, and Blackboard.

== Historical collection ==
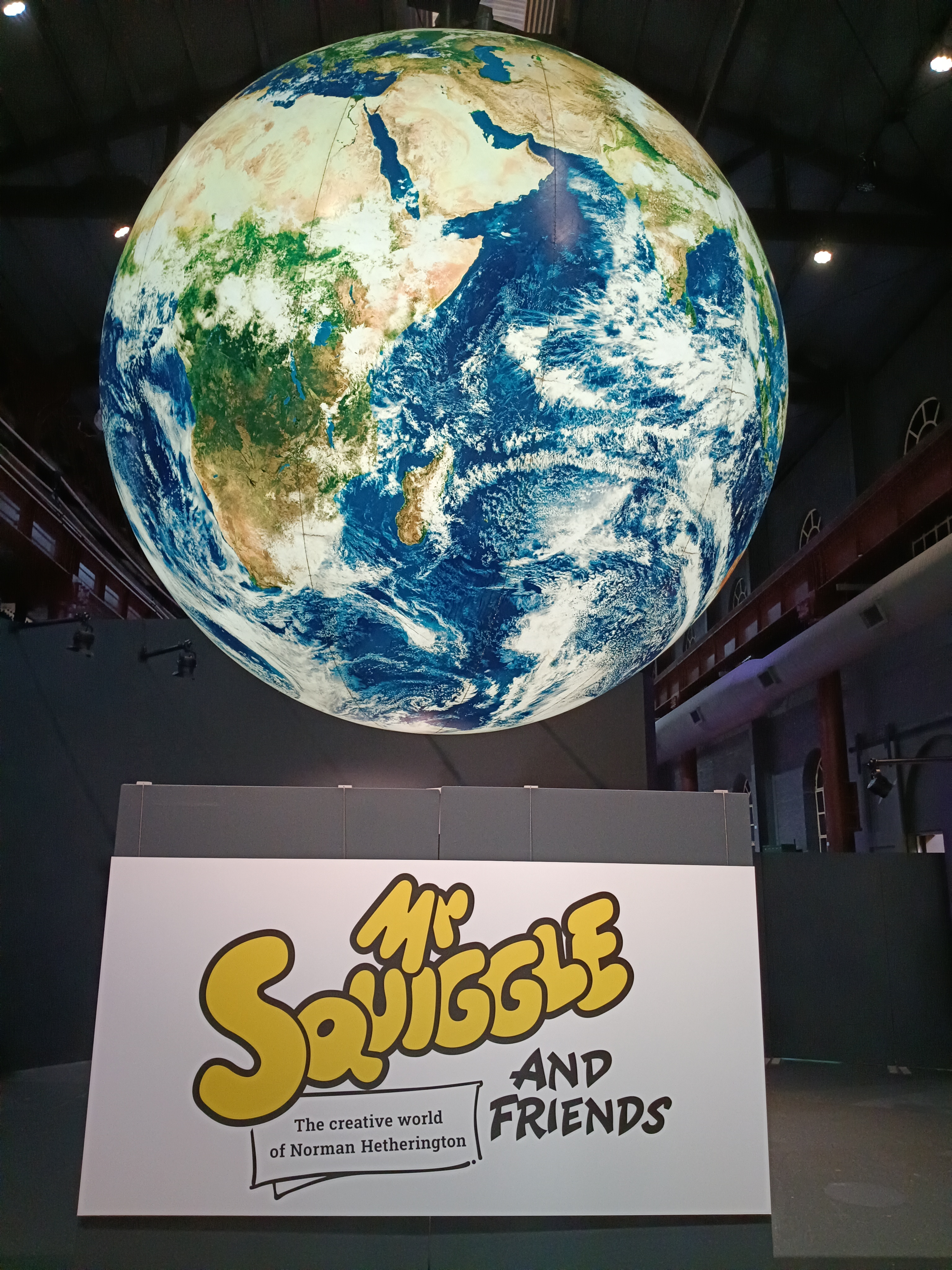
Entrance to the Mr Squiggle and Friends exhibition at Newcastle Museum in 2026.

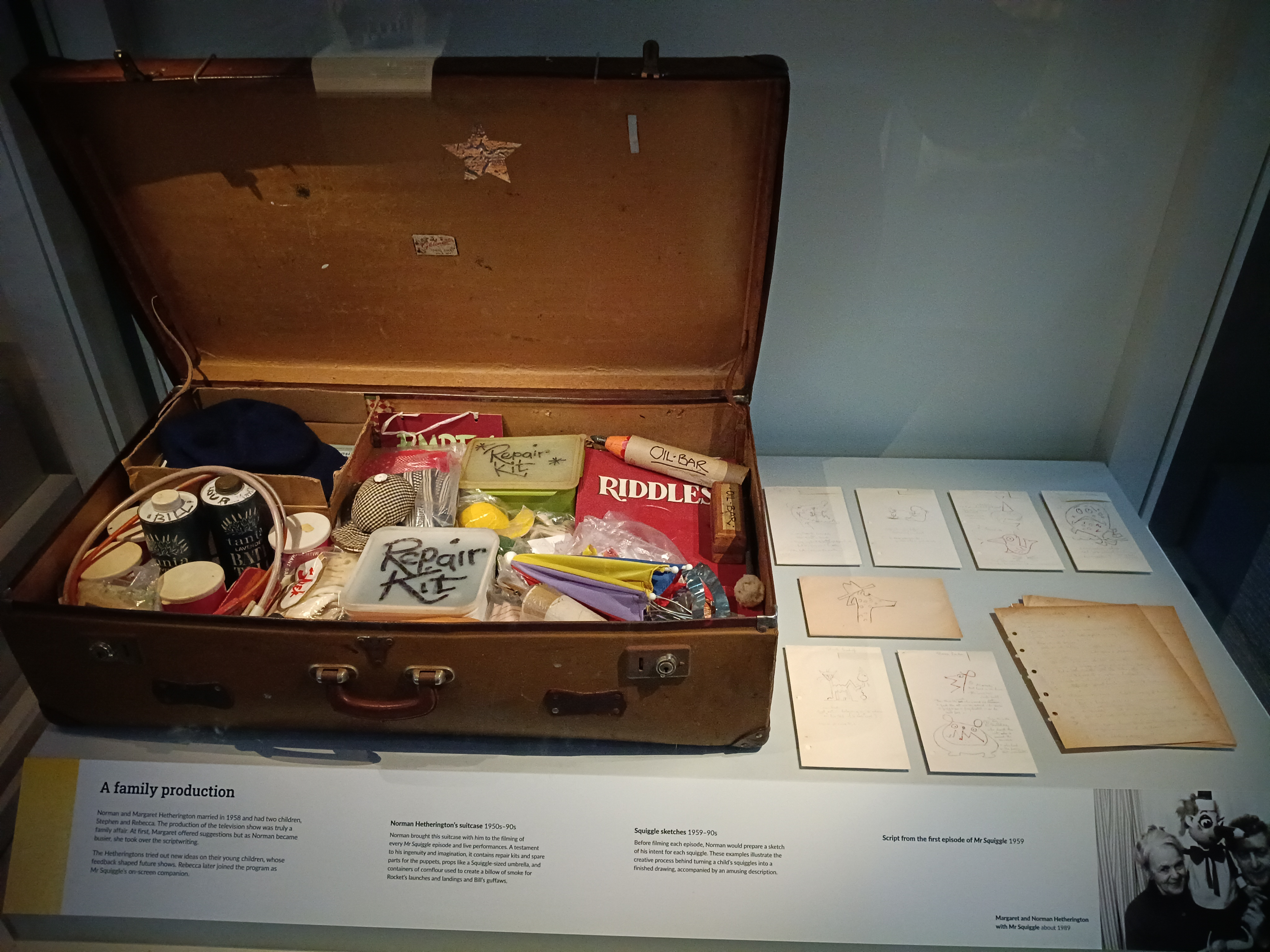
Original items from Norman Hetherington's collection, including his puppet repair briefcase, sketches and the script for the first episode of Mr Squiggle.

In April 2024, the National Museum of Australia announced that it had acquired a collection of Norman Hetherington's puppets, scripts, artworks, props, graphics, merchandise, and fans' "squiggles", with the intention of eventually putting them on display.

The National Museum of Australia put these items on display from July to October 2025.

In 2026, a selection from the collection formed the travelling exhibition Mr Squiggle and Friends: The Creative World of Norman Hetherington, which was displayed at Newcastle Museum from July to November 2026.

== See also ==
- Norman Hetherington – Australian cartoonist (1921–2010)
- List of longest-running Australian television series
