= Mike Dorsey =

Australian actor

- Mike Dorsey as Reg MacDonald in Number 96.
- Born: Michael James Dorsey; 4 January 1930; Yorkshire, England
- Died: October 24, 2014 (aged 84); Rockingham, Western Australia, Australia
- Occupations: Actor; publicity officer; tour manager; Australian army personnel
- Years active: late 1940s-1990, 2007
- Notable work: Number 96 - The Young Doctors - Lockie Leonard

Michael James Dorsey (4 January 1930 – 24 October 2014) was an English-born Australian theatre and television actor, publicity officer, and tour manager.

Dorsey appeared in the TV series The Unloved, but was best known for his television soap opera roles in Number 96 as Reginald "Daddy" McDonald, and The Young Doctors, as Sir Clifford Langley. He also played Pop in the series Lockie Leonard.

== Early life and career ==
Dorsey was born in Yorkshire, England in January 1930. His acting career began in the late 1940s when he started acting in small parts with the Gate Theatre, Dublin. After three years in the army, Dorsey returned to acting in the early 1950s, with several minor stage roles on the UK provincial theatre circuit.

== Publicity officer ==
The scarcity of acting work led to a career change in the publicity business, and Dorsey subsequently did the publicity in London for such performers as Kenny Ball, Acker Bilk, and The Yardbirds. He later did two tours with The Rolling Stones, one of which brought him to Australia where he decided to settle in 1965.

== Acting career ==
Dorsey's career as an actor and performer quickly took off after emigrating to Australia, beginning in the mid-1960s, he had several guest-starring roles in Australian TV series including Riptide, Skippy the Bush Kangaroo, and many appearance's in the various Crawford Productions police drama series. During this period, he also played the ongoing role of Captain Roke in the Australian Broadcasting Corporation-Artransa Film science fiction children's series Phoenix Five (1970). He was the straight man on Joe Martin's show Tonight on Channel Ten.

He had a brief role as a police detective in series Number 96 in 1972, but in January 1974, he gained the regular role in the serial of the comedy character Reginald P. MacDonald, often referred to by his wife and daughter as "Daddy". An officious bureaucrat with the local council, buttoned-down Reg lived a regimented life and liked to speak in acronyms as a sort of verbal shorthand. He would frequently register his indignation with signature phrase "Great Scott!". Along with wife Edie – otherwise known as "Mother" or "Mummy" – (Wendy Blacklock) and there adopted daughter Marilyn (Frances Hargreaves), the character became a hit with viewers, however unlike other regular members of the cast, they didn't feature in the Number 96 feature film version. In late 1976, there were plans to spin off the characters known as Mummy and Daddy into a new situation comedy series titled Mummy and Me,, However, the proposed series was not picked up by the network and the characters remained in Number 96. Dorsey and Blacklock played in Number 96 continuously until it ended in August 1977, surviving several drastic cast purges during the show's closing months.

After the series ended, Dorsey, like many of his former Number 96 co-stars, had a guest starring role in school-based drama Glenview High (1977). In the late 1970s, Dorsey and his main Number 96 co-star Wendy Blacklock created a stage show based on their Number 96 characters which toured clubs in New South Wales over a period of nearly two years.

In 1978–1979, Dorsey played an ongoing role on the hospital-based soap opera The Young Doctors. He then took the regular role of Vic Marshall in Network Ten's daily soap opera Arcade (1980), a notorious critical and popular failure cancelled after being on air only six weeks. Dorsey subsequently ran a theatrical group.

After having not appeared in roles since 1990, Dorsey was cast in 2007 in the role of 'Pop' in the children's television series 'Lockie Leonard', filmed in Western Australia, in which he played the role of Lockie's grandfather. He portrayed the role in the first and second series as a recurring character, but not actively as a main role.

== Personal life ==
Dorsey married his lifelong partner, Pamela Borain, on 18 April 2010, at their property in Baldivis, Western Australia, where they lived. He died peacefully aged 84, at Rockingham General Hospital on Friday 24 October 2014.

== Filmography ==
=== Film ===
Title	Year	Role	Type
1969	Little Jungle Boy	Doctor Mike Martin	TV film
1973	Night of Fear	The Lover	Feature film

=== Television ===
Title	Year	Role	Type
1966	Contrabandits	George Bishop	TV series
1967	Hunter	Mike Edwards	TV series
1968	Skippy the Bush Kangaroo	Alan Condon	TV series
1968	The Unloved		TV series, 210 episodes
1969	Riptide	Professor Bruce Crane / Toby Dale	TV series
1970	The Rovers	Brian McCall	TV series, 1 episode
1970	The Link Men	Jack Westam	TV series
1970	Phoenix Five	Captain Mike Roke	TV series, 26 episodes
1971	Spyforce	American Officer	TV series
1971	The Comedy Game	Reporter	TV series
1972	Catwalk	Don Jennings	TV series
1967-73	Homicide	3 roles	TV series
1973	Boney	Robert Downes	TV series
1973	Matlock Police	Alec Gibson	TV series
1973-74	The Evil Touch	Wallace	TV series
1974	Silent Number	Catholic Policeman	TV series
1969-74	Division 4	3 roles	TV series
1972-77	Number 96	Detective Superintendent Carroll / Reginald “Daddy” McDonald	TV series, 220 episodes
1977	Glenview High	Doyle	TV series
1979	The Young Doctors	Sir Clifford Langley	TV series
1979	Doctor Down Under	Mr. Soames	TV series
1980	Arcade	Vic Marshall	TV series, 35 episodes
1990	Jackaroo	Swanson	TV miniseries
2007	Lockie Leonard	Pop	TV series
