= John Dommett =

Australian actor

- Born: 1946; Brisbane, Queensland, Australia
- Died: 8 January 2004 (aged 57–58); Brisbane, Queensland, Australia
- Occupations: Actor; writer; director

John Dommett (1946 – 8 January 2004) was an Australian actor, writer and director in regular demand on stage and television.

== Biography ==
Dommett is probably best known to international audiences for his portrayal, between 1976 and 1979, of Dr. Jim Howard, one of the original characters in Channel Nine's long-running soap opera The Young Doctors.

John Dommett died in Brisbane of a heart attack at the age of 57. The Performing Arts Conservatory in Brisbane awards a yearly medal in John's honour for outstanding industry achievement to a graduate working in the professional industry for either theatre, television or film achievement. John was to come on staff as a teacher at the Conservatory in 2003 when his health precluded his continuing work there. He is remembered every May at the Conservatory's graduation when the medal is awarded. John was himself a recipient of a Queensland Matilda Award for best actor when he won for his performance in 'Kiss of the Spider Woman' produced in Brisbane at the Powerhouse Theatre which was directed by a Performing Arts Conservatory Graduate Andre Seager. John studied at the Royal Academy of Dramatic Art in London.

He ran a theatrical agency and drama school in Brisbane during the 1990s.
