= Strange Holiday (1970 film) =

- Based on: Two Years' Vacation by Jules Verne
- Written by: Mende Brown
- Directed by: Mende Brown
- Starring: Jaeme Hamilton
- Music by: Tommy Tycho
- Country of origin: Australia
- Original language: English

Production
- Producer: Mende Brown
- Cinematography: Brendan Brown
- Editor: G. Turney-Smith
- Running time: 90 minutes (includes overnight Seven News Updates/long ad breaks)
- Production companies: Mass-Brown Pictures; Artransa Park Films

Original release
- Network: Seven Network
- Release: 28 August 1970

Strange Holiday is a 1970 Australian television film directed by Mende Brown and starring Jaeme Hamilton.

== Plot ==
Ten boys and a dog are shipwrecked on an island in the Pacific. After a storm they discover another boat has been shipwrecked on the island. They make friends with two of the survivors, a nurse and ship's carpenter, but discover there are three other survivors who are ruthless mutineers. The children manage to outwit the mutineers, the carpenter builds them a boat and they sail home.

== Cast ==
- Jaeme Hamilton as Briant
- Mark Healey as Doniphan
- Jaime Massang as Mocco
- Van Alexander as Gordon
- Ross Williams as Jacob
- Simon Asprey as Iverson
- Peter Alexander as Garnett
- Michael Berry as Service
- Mark Lee as Costar
- Larry Crane as Wilcox
- Carmen Duncan as nurse
- Garry Pankhurst
- Ben Gabriel
- Mark Hertson
- Goff Vockler
- Tony Allan
- Don McNiven
- Nigel Lovell

== Production ==
The film was financed by an American company seeking product for the US TV market and Artransa Film Studios. Shooting began in April 1969 in the Artransa Studios at Sydney and up the coast nearby. Production soon followed on another feature Little Jungle Boy (1970).

== Reception ==
The movie returned a comfortable profit to its investors.
