= Mende Brown =

American film director

Mende Brown (September 7, 1920 – February 2, 2002) was an American writer, producer and director of radio, films and TV who lived and worked in Australia from 1970 to 1991.

His directing on radio included The Affairs of Peter Salem.

== Family ==
Mende Brown was the brother of radio producer Himan Brown.

== Select Credits ==
- Strange Holiday (1970)
- Little Jungle Boy (1970)
- And Millions Will Die (1973)
- Evil Touch (1973) (TV series)
- On the Run (1982)
