= Suspect (The General Motors Hour) =

- The General Motors Hour episode
- Episode no.: Season 3 Episode 1
- Directed by: Ian Jones
- Teleplay by: Peter Cotes
- Based on: Suspect by: Edward Percy; Reginald Denham
- Original air date: 3 June 1962
- Running time: 90 mins

Guest appearance
- Joan Miller

Episode chronology
| ← Previous "The Mystery of a Hansom Cab" | Next → "The One Day of the Year" |

"Suspect" is a 1961 Australian television play. It was originally made for HSV-7 then presented as part of The General Motors Hour It was produced by Peter Cotes, who had made Long Distance. "Suspect" aired on 3 June 1962 in Sydney and Melbourne, and on 7 October 1962 in Brisbane and Adelaide.

Cotes adapted the play Suspect by Edward Percy and Reginald Denham which was based on the Sandyford murder case.

== Plot ==
The son of Mrs Smith (née Maggie Wishart) is about to marry a doctor's daughter. A press baron, Sir Hugo, arrives who thirty years ago covered a trial where Maggie cut up her mother and father with an axe. Maggie claims she's innocent... but is she telling the truth?

== Cast ==
- Joan Miller as Mrs Smith
- Kenneth Burgess as Rev. Alfred Combermere
- Moira Carleton as Goodie McIntire
- Michael Duffield as Dr. Rendle
- Patsy King as Janet
- Clement McCallin as Sir Hugo
- Fred Parslow as Robert
- Bettina Welchas Lady Const

== Production ==
The play had been adapted for US TV in 1948 and 1952 and for British TV in 1939, 1946 and 1958.

The show starred Cotes' wife, Joan Miller, who had performed in the play on British TV for the BBC in 1958.

It was one of four productions Cotes made in Australia, the others being Long Distance, Candida, and Shadow of the Vine. He said he would have made more but for the credit freeze, which was blamed for a failure to find sponsors. While Long Distance was shown while Cotes was in Australia, they other three were not broadcast until months later.

== Reception ==
The Bulletin called it "lunacy... most of the cast borrowed their dramatics from a time when over acting for the silents set the universal style... a fusty, trivial play. Condemnation must extend to those who accepted it as suitable for television billed it as a thriller, designed a set that dominated most of the action, and made this worse by camera work that frequently gave the setting nine-tenths of the picture.".

The Age said it "commanded attention."
