= The Mystery of a Hansom Cab (The General Motors Hour) =

- The General Motors Hour episode
- Episode no.: Season 2 Episode 2
- Directed by: Rod Kinnear
- Teleplay by: Barry Pree
- Original air date: 6 August 1961
- Running time: 90 mins

Episode chronology
← Previous "The Concert"	Next → "Suspect"

"The Mystery of a Hansom Cab" is a 1961 Australian television drama play based on Barry Pree's 1961 play adaptation of the novel by Fergus Hume. It appeared as an episode of the anthology series The General Motors Hour. It aired on 6 August 1961 in Sydney and on 19 August 1961 in Melbourne.

The play had just completed a 12-week run in Melbourne.

== Premise ==
In 1890s Melbourne, a young man murders a blackmailer in a hansom cab. The murdered kills three more people then romances an heiress.

== Cast ==
- Barry Pree as the innocent man wrongly accused of the crime
- Fred Parslow as the villain
- Leon Lissek
- Elaine Cusik
- Joan Harris
- Mary Hardy as Salvation Army Girl
- Robert Hornery as her boyfriend
- Patsy King
- Bryan Edward
- Marion Edward
- Ron Finney
- Graeme Hughes
- Malcolm Phillips
- Dennis Miller as Colton

== 1961 play version ==
Actor-writer Barry Pree, then 22 years of age, had adapted the novel into a stage play. It was the first commissioned play for the Union Theatre Repertory Company, later the Melbourne Theatre Company by its first writer in residence. (He did this on the basis of his play A Fox in the Night written when he was 19.)

John Sumner had suggested Pree adapt the novel, which had been hugely popular in its day but had not been revived for a number of years.

Pree took a farcical approach to the material, turning it into a spoof of old time melodramas. The original directors were John Sumner and George Ogilvie. It debuted at the Union Theatre in Parkville on 9 January 1961 and ran until 4 February. The cast were headed by Lewis Fiander (hero), Frederick Parslow (Villain) and Patsy King. The Age called it a triumph for all concerned... rollicking good fun and entertainment." Another review in the same paper called it "unqualifiedly good entertainment." The Bulletin said "most audiences will enjoy Pree's joke."

The play then had a run at Russell Street Theatre from March until May. The stage play was very popular with audiences. The cast included Fred Parslow, Joan Harris and Mary Hardy, who had been in many Melbourne musicals, including Free as Air, Salad Days and Auntie Mamie.

== TV version ==
The TV adaptation was basically a filmed version of the stage performance. It was filmed at the Russell St Theatre Melbourne and included the reactions of the audience applauding the hero and booing and throwing peanuts at the villain, with occasional cutaways to a pianist playing "mood music". Two songs of the era, "Daisy" and "Lily of the Laguna" were played. It took 24 hours to move the recording equipment from the studio to the theatre.

The Sydney Morning Herald said Barry Pree played "a personably virtuous hero with a variable Irish accent, cheerfully mixed top-hatted histrionics with music-hall singing and dancing, a barrow-load of deliberate anachronisms, and some mockery of modern Melbourne in the style of intimate revue."

=== Songs ===
- "Come to the Garden Maud"
- "Daisy"
- "Lily of the Laguna"

== Reception ==
The TV critic for the Sydney Morning Herald called it "an interesting experiment... only partially successful in terms of the special techniques of television. There were too many long-distance shots, of doll-like .figures on stage; not enough of the searching intimacy of expression on which television thrives."

The Australian Woman's Weekly said "As is fashionable with such melodramas nowadays, the audience was invited to throw peanuts at the villain. It could have done without the topicality and the peanuts. The audience, carried away, apparently, by being on TV, showered the cast indiscriminately with peanuts to the point of being irritating."

The novel was adapted for Australian radio later in 1961.
