= Manhaul =

- The General Motors Hour episode
- Episode no.: Season 3 Episode 4
- Directed by: Rod Kinnear; John Sumner
- Teleplay by: Osmar White
- Original air date: 8 September 1962
- Running time: 60 mins 75 mins (Melbourne)

Episode chronology
← Previous "Candida"	Next → "Shadow of the Vine"

"Manhaul" is a 1962 Australian television film. It aired 8 September 1962 as part of The General Motors Hour, an occasional series which presented various one-off productions. It aired on 8 September 1962 on ATN-7 in Sydney, on 8 September 1962 on GTV-9 in Melbourne, and on 15 September 1962 on QTQ-9 in Brisbane, despite the two stations having severed their relationship with the formation of the Nine Network.

Filmink magazine later wrote "Tell us this doesn’t sound like it would be awesome?... Australia's own version of The Thing ... Well, with no creature but still ... a murder mystery at a base in Antarctica ... How cool is that?"

== Plot ==
At an Australian outpost in Douglas Bay in the Australian Antarctic Territory, there are seven men, who have served there for 12 months. They are meant to be relieved but then their departure is delayed.

Frieberg is a Jewish man which a power over Norwegian, Sven Nordstrom, which results in Nordstrom doing Frieberg's work. Other men include the Australian Dinny, the camp doctor Dr. Lewis Hilton, a meteorologist called Sietel and the expedition leader, Charles Forrester.

Frieberg is found dead in the snow with a bullet in his back The expedition cannot be relieved for another six months. Forrester took the only rifle and seal gun, locked himself in a separate hut, and let everyone think he did it. The expedition members decide to manhaul over the ice rather than stay in cap, but Forrester stopped that by driving the only tractor into the bay.

Eventually Sven reveals Frieberg's power over him became about because Sven's father commanded a concentration camp, leading to blackmail and murder.

== Cast ==
- Wynn Roberts as Charles Forrester
- Fred Parslow as Dr Lewis
- George Fairfax as Sietel
- Gordon Glenwright as an Australian, Dinny McQuade
- Kurt Ludescher as Sven Nordstrom.
- Dennis Miller as Hilton
- Bruce Barry as Frieberg

== Production ==
The play was written by former Australian war correspondent Osmar White, who had accompanied the 1955-58 expedition to the South Pole.

The cast was all-male and consisted of six Melbourne actors and one Sydney actor (Gordon Glenwright). Most of the play takes place in three snow huts built in the Melbourne studio from the authentic patterns of those constructed in the Antarctic.

It included footage shot in the Antarctic.

It was produced and directed jointly by the team of Rod Kinnear and John Sumner who had previously collaborated on the adaptation of The One Day of the Year.

It was shot at GTV-9 studios in Melbourne. Shooting took two Saturdays.

== Running time ==
There is conflicting information on the running time. The Age listed it as airing in a 75-minute time-slot, while the Sydney Morning Herald listed it airing in a 60-minute time-slot. The running time excluding commercials is not known (for example, hour-long Homicide episodes from the mid-1960s often run 45–47 minutes, while Bandstand episodes could run as long as 51 minutes. 1960 television film Reflections in Dark Glasses, which aired in a one-hour time-slot runs 48 minutes).

== Reception ==
The TV critic for the Sydney Morning Herald said "a well-built set and two or three good performances... did much to enliven" the production and that it was "a good idea" but "unfortunately, Mr White seems to have been in some doubt whether to make his play a simple whodunit or a study of the kind of men who for reasons not purely scientific, might seek refuge from life in a world of isolation. The compromise required in attempting both was damaging to the play... If local TV drama is to be taken seriously, it will need better productions than this one... and better plays" "

The play was criticised by the Anglican church for the language used by the characters.

The Bulletin called it "impossible.... though well produced, mounted and photographed on tape, the whole affair was preposterous and only productions which set out to be just that, to provoke laughter, can stay the viewers' itchy tuning finger when unlikely things begin to happen on the screen. Perhaps the oddest aspect of all was the credit given to the Commonwealth Antarctic Division for its co-operation, exact nature unstated, in the production. "Manhaul" was neatly calculated to give us the impression that some part of our taxes are used to maintain groups of men in bickering idleness down in the Antarctic. The characters in view were nearly all "here for the money" but did nothing visible to earn it, seemed willing to talk forever about their personal problems but almost never about their official business below 40 decrees S., and maintained occasional outside contact with a Morse outfit."

== See also ==
- Shell Presents
