= Candida (The General Motors Hour) =

- The General Motors Hour episode
- Episode no.: Season 3 Episode 3
- Directed by: Peter Cotes
- Based on: Candida by George Bernard Shaw
- Original air date: 5 August 1962
- Running time: 90 mins

Episode chronology
← Previous "The One Day of the Year"	Next → "Manhaul"

"Candida" is an episode of the Australian television series The General Motors Hour, that aired on 5 August 1962.

It was an adaptation of the play Candida by George Bernard Shaw and was directed by visiting producer Peter Cotes. It was one of several productions Cotes did in Australia. It was originally made for HSV-7 then presented as part of The General Motors Hour. Australian TV drama was relatively rare at the time.

== Plot ==
Candida is married to Rev James Morrell.

== Cast ==
- Joan Miller as Candida
- Lewis Flander as Marchbanks
- William Hodge as Burgess
- Jeffrey Hodgson as Rev Alexander Mill
- Madeline Howell as Proserpine Garnett
- Geoffrey King as Morell

== Production ==
Joan Miller had performed the title role on the West End in 1953. The production was shot in Melbourne.

It was one of four productions Cotes made in Australia, the others being Long Distance, Suspect, and Shadow of the Vine. He said he would have made more but for the credit freeze. Cotes made it a year before it aired.

== Reception ==
The TV critic for The Sydney Morning Herald said the production "had all the virtues of brilliant casting and all the vices of poor technique... [it] appeared simply as a televised stage production, without any special reference to the distinctive vocabulary of TV, production itself. In addition, camera work, sound and sets were well below par for the course; camera angles were monotonous and too inclusive_, sound poor, and sets fussily elaborate and consequently distracting. Few will cavil at the quality of the acting, however."

The Bulletin also gave it a poor review saying it "had a fine period setting, Miss Joan Miller in the title role, and dialogue to match the furnishings."

The Age called it "another example of a brilliant professional at work" although felt Miller "did not however have the impact of her earlier roles."
