= Long Distance (The General Motors Hour) =

- The General Motors Hour episode
- Directed by: Peter Cotes
- Teleplay by: Peter Cotes
- Based on: 1948 American radio play
- Original air date: 8 June 1961
- Running time: 30 mins

Guest appearance
- Joan Miller

"Long Distance" is a 1961 Australian television film. It was based on a 1948 American radio play, and retained the U.S. setting. It was among the first local drama productions by station HSV-7, and aired in a 30-minute time-slot. It was telecast on 8 June. An excerpt from it appeared in a 2006 documentary called Studio One, suggesting Long Distance still exists despite the wiping of the era. The film was produced by British producer Peter Cotes and starred his wife, Joan Miller. It was recorded in March 1961 but its air date was pushed back to 8 June 1961, due to a talk by the Prime Minister. It was the only one of Cotes' Australian productions to air while he was in Australia; the others were not screened until the following year.

== Premise ==
A woman's husband is to be executed. After finding proof that he is innocent, his wife tries to contact the judge, but only has 30 minutes to do so.

== Cast ==
- Joan Miller as Anne Jacks
- Mary Disney as chief telephone operator
- Letty Craydon as Mrs Maclean
- Kenneth Goodlet as Warden
- Pat Hackett as first operator
- Olive Jan as second operator
- Bunney Brooke as Golden Gate operator
- Ken Warne as room clerk
- Elizabeth Goodman as San Francisco operator
- Margaret Browne as Chicago operator
- Diana Bell as information operator
- Peter Aanensen as barman
- Don Crosby as Mr Anderson
- Kendrick Hudson as Judge Maclean
- Ron Shand as porter

== Production ==
Cotes arrived in Australia in March 1961. It was the first of four productions he made in Australia, the others being Suspect, Candide and Shadow of the Vine. He said he would have made more but for the credit freeze.

Overseas versions of Long Distance had previously been seen on Australian TV. Cotes said his main reason for making Long Distance was to introduce Miller, his Canadian-born wife, to Australian audiences. Miller had previously appeared in a production of the play for British TV. Cotes was in Australia until September 1961 to set up the HSV Drama Department.

There was a cast of fifteen. Rehearsals started 8 May 1961 and it was taped on 18 May 1961. It was filmed in two of HSV-7's studios in Dorcas Street, connected by a central control room. It ran for 30 minutes. The next shows made, Shadow of the Vine and Candida ran for 90 minutes.

== Reception ==
The Age newspaper, in the section Teletopics, said that "Joan Miller gave a most moving portrayal" and that the show "lived up to expectation".

== See also ==
- Shell Presents
- The General Motors Hour
