= Dennis Miller (Australian actor) =

Australian actor

- Born: 1937; Hobart, Tasmania, Australia
- Died: 2 October 2022 (aged 84–85)
- Occupation: Actor
- Years active: 1958–2000
- Known for: Bellbird as Constable Des Davies; Blue Heelers as Sgt. Pat Doyle
- Spouse: Elspeth Ballantyne (m. 1968; div. 1977)
- Children: 2

Dennis Miller (1937 – 2 October 2022) was an Australian stage, television and film actor, best known for his roles in TV movies and series.

== Early life ==
Miller was born in Hobart, Tasmania in 1937. His family had no background in show business and had a church background on both sides. His great-grandfather built the first church in Bordertown, South Australia in the 1800s. As a youth, he played football for the Hobart Rules club Clarence.

Miller was initially studying for a degree in agricultural science at Hobart University, when he developed an interest in acting. He joined the university's Old Nick Company and later, the Hobart Repertory Company.

== Career ==
Miller relocated from Hobart to Melbourne, where he spent time playing a wide variety of roles in local theatre, predominantly for the Union Theatre Repertory Company (the formative Melbourne Theatre Company). One of these was the Alan Hopgood play And the Big Men Fly (1963), a football comedy in which he starred as Achilles Jones, alongside his future wife, Elspeth Ballantyne. After the production proved popular, it was filmed for television and was broadcast on 5 October 1963, the night of the VFL Grand Final. He later appeared in a 1974 miniseries adaptation of the play, this time playing the role of Moola Barnes.

Another early role was as Hughie in the televised play The One Day of the Year (1962). He was best known however, for the ABC rural soap opera Bellbird as Constable Des Davies and later, his recurring role on long-running police drama series Blue Heelers as ex-sergeant Pat Doyle, from 1994 to 2000.

Miller also had notable roles in serials such as The Flying Doctors, Stingers and A Country Practice. In 1990, he had a starring role in children's series Elly & Jools as Fergus Finian 'Feral' O'Farrell. Additionally, he appeared in several miniseries including Scales of Justice (1983) with Bill Hunter, The Cowra Breakout (1984), Colour in the Creek (1985), The Dirtwater Dynasty (1988), and Kangaroo Palace (1997).

Miller appeared in numerous films, both theatrically-released and made-for-TV, including The Last of the Knucklemen (1979) alongside Steve Bisley and Michael Caton and The Everlasting Secret Family (1988) with Mark Lee. Other film credits included Stir (1980) opposite Bryan Brown, Hoodwink (1981) with Judy Davis and Geoffrey Rush, Starstruck (1982), Heatwave (1982), Buddies (1983) with Colin Friels, and Emerald City (1988) opposite Nicole Kidman in an early role.

He also had a role in 1988 biopic A Cry in the Dark (aka Evil Angels), opposite Meryl Streep and Sam Neill, which depicted the real life story of the disappearance of Azaria Chamberlain and the legal trial that followed.

== Personal life and death ==
Miller was married to actress Elspeth Ballantyne from 1968 to 1977. Both had leading roles in the long-running series Bellbird. They have two sons together – Matthew and Tobias.

Miller retired from the industry in 2000. He died from undisclosed causes on 2 October 2022.

== Filmography ==
=== Film ===
| Year | Title | Role | Type |
|---|---|---|---|
| 1969 | It Takes All Kinds | Uncredited | Feature film |
| 1971 | Stork | University Lecturer | Feature film |
| 1971 | The Hot Centre of the World | | Short film |
| 1973 | Alvin Purple | Mr. Horwood | Feature film |
| 1975 | The Great Macarthy | MacGuinness | Feature film |
| 1976 | Mad Dog Morgan | Prison Boat Guard | Feature film |
| 1976 | Eliza Fraser | Frans Cook | Feature film |
| 1979 | The Last of the Knucklemen | Horse | Feature film |
| 1979 | The Journalist | Junior Interviewer | Feature film |
| 1980 | Stir | Redford | Feature film |
| 1981 | Hoodwink | Ralph | Feature film |
| 1982 | Heatwave | Mick Davies | Feature film |
| 1982 | Starstruck | Lou | Feature film |
| 1982 | A Most Attractive Man | Mick | Feature film |
| 1983 | Buddies | Andy | Feature film |
| 1984 | My First Wife | Public Bar Patron (uncredited) | Feature film |
| 1984 | Silver City | Max | Feature film |
| 1986 | Frog Dreaming (aka The Quest) | Mr. Cannon | Feature film |
| 1988 | The Everlasting Secret Family | Eric the Chauffeur | Feature film |
| 1988 | A Cry in the Dark (aka Evil Angels) | Sturgess | Feature film |
| 1988 | Emerald City | Malcolm Bennett | Feature film |
| 1990 | Plead Guilty, Get a Bond | | Short film |
| 1993 | Broken Highway | Max O'Donnell | Feature film |
| 1993 | This Won't Hurt a Bit | Riley | Feature film |

=== Television ===
| Year | Title | Role | Type |
|---|---|---|---|
| 1959 | Ned Kelly | | TV play |
| 1959 | Outpost | Corporal Mitch Mitchell | TV play |
| 1959 | Treason | Orderly | TV play |
| 1960 | Uncle Martino | Michel | TV play |
| 1960 | Eye of the Night | Ian Arnott | TV play |
| 1961 | Mystery of a Hansom Cab | Colton | TV play, episode of The General Motors Hour |
| 1962 | The One Day of the Year | Hughie | TV play, episode of The General Motors Hour |
| 1962 | Manhaul | Hilton | TV play, episode of The General Motors Hour |
| 1963 | A Piece of Ribbon | | TV play |
| 1963 | And the Big Men Fly | Achilles Jones | TV play |
| 1965 | Romanoff and Juliet | Soldier | TV play |
| 1965 | Otherwise Engaged | Tom | TV play |
| 1966 | Australian Playhouse | The Boundary Driver / Fred Taylor | 2 episodes |
| 1967 | Adventures of the Seaspray | Fred | 1 episode |
| 1967 | Love and War | Lieutenant | Miniseries, episode: "Man of Destiny" |
| 1968 | Contrabandits | Steve Chambers | 1 episode |
| 1968 | Cobwebs in Concrete | Scott Harland | TV play |
| 1968–1974 | Bellbird | Constable Des Davies | 991 episodes |
| 1969 | Good Morning, Mr. Doubleday | Ex-boyfriend | 1 episode |
| 1969 | Riptide | Jeff Challis | 1 episode |
| 1970; 1973 | Homicide | Gary Simms / Ronald Parker | 2 episodes |
| 1971 | Division 4 | Constable Shaw | 1 episode |
| 1972–1976 | Matlock Police | Norm Moore / Ted Sanders / Bernie Clay | 3 episodes |
| 1973 | President Wilson in Paris | Colonel House | TV play |
| 1973 | Brumby Innes | Brumby Innes | TV play |
| 1974 | The End Product | Craven | TV play |
| 1974 | And the Big Men Fly | Moola Barnes | Miniseries, 6 episodes |
| 1974 | Rush | Brady | 1 episode |
| 1974 | Number 96 | Peter Wilson | 8 episodes |
| 1975 | Silent Number | Byron | 1 episode |
| 1975 | Scattergood: Friend of All | | 1 episode |
| 1976 | Murcheson Creek | | TV film |
| 1981 | I Can Jump Puddles | Gunner | Miniseries, 2 episodes |
| 1982 | Spring and Fall | Phil | 1 episode |
| 1982 | MPSIB | Barney Blake | 1 episode |
| 1982–1984 | A Country Practice | Merve Winters / Ben Prescott / Ron Barnes | 18 episodes |
| 1983 | The Dismissal | Gordon Scholes / The Second Speaker | Miniseries, 2 episodes |
| 1983 | Scales of Justice | Detective Sgt. Ken Draffin | Miniseries, 2 episodes |
| 1983 | Platypus Cove | Sergeant Don Bailey | TV film |
| 1984 | Singles | Rob | 1 episode |
| 1984 | The Cowra Breakout | Mick Murphy | Miniseries, 5 episodes |
| 1984 | Special Squad | Finch | 1 episode |
| 1984 | Carson's Law | Frank Stirling | 1 episode |
| 1985 | Winners | Ron Guthrie | 1 episode |
| 1985 | Colour in the Creek | John Fletcher | Miniseries, 10 episodes |
| 1985 | I Live with Me Dad | Joe Kazzirak | TV film |
| 1986 | The Great Bookie Robbery | Edwards | Miniseries, 3 episodes |
| 1986 | Shark's Paradise | Inspector Rossiter | TV film |
| 1987 | The Petrov Affair | Eddie War | Miniseries, 2 episodes |
| 1988 | Touch the Sun: Peter and Pompey | Maxie Barbuto | TV film |
| 1988 | Barracuda (aka The Rocks) | Detective Snr. Constable Abbottson | TV film |
| 1988 | The Dirtwater Dynasty | Hasky Tarbox | Miniseries, 5 episodes |
| 1988 | All the Way | Ray Scott | Miniseries, 3 episodes |
| 1988 | Rafferty's Rules | Ronald Harvey | 1 episode |
| 1988 | The Riddle of the Stinson | Flight Captain Rex Boyden | TV film |
| 1988 | The Magistrate | Roger Davies | Miniseries, 6 episodes |
| 1990 | The Paper Man | George Slater | Miniseries, 4 episodes |
| 1990 | Elly & Jools | Fergus Finian 'Feral' O'Farrell | Miniseries, 12 episodes |
| 1991 | The Flying Doctors | Greg Carpenter | 1 episode |
| 1991 | Boys from the Bush | Gabby | 1 episode |
| 1991 | Col’n Carpenter | | 1 episode |
| 1991 | Chances | Eddie Reynolds | 27 episodes |
| 1994–2000 | Blue Heelers | Detective Pat Doyle | 14 episodes |
| 1995 | Blue Murder | Detective Inspector Bruce Kerrison | Miniseries, 1 episode |
| 1995; 1996 | G.P. | Arthur Hardigan / Snr Sgt Tony Atford | 2 episodes |
| 1997 | Good Guys Bad Guys | Rufus King | 1 episode |
| 1997 | The Last of the Ryans | Harold | TV film |
| 1997 | Kangaroo Palace | Mr. Turner | Miniseries, 2 episodes |
| 1997 | One Way Ticket | Alf | TV film |
| 1999 | Stingers | Detective Inspector Malcolm Harris | 2 episodes |

== Theatre ==
| Year | Title | Role | Type | Ref. |
|---|---|---|---|---|
| 1958 | Cupid Rampant | | National Theatre, Launceston with Old Nick Company | |
| 1958 | Tartuffe | | Playhouse, Hobart with Hobart Repertory Theatre Society | |
| 1958 | The Caine Mutiny Court-Martial | | Playhouse, Hobart with Hobart Repertory Theatre Society | |
| 1959 | Ring Round the Moon | | Playhouse, Hobart with Hobart Repertory Theatre Society | |
| 1960 | She Stoops to Conquer | Young Marlow | University of Melbourne with Union Theatre Rep Co | |
| 1960 | Visit to a Small Planet | Conrad Mayberry | University of Melbourne with Union Theatre Rep Co | |
| 1960 | A Taste of Honey | Assistant Stage Manager | University of Melbourne with Union Theatre Rep Co | |
| 1960 | See How They Run | Assistant Stage Manager | University of Melbourne with Union Theatre Rep Co | |
| 1960 | Man and Superman | Hector Malone / Assistant Stage Manager | University of Melbourne with Union Theatre Rep Co | |
| 1961 | The Mystery of a Hansom Cab | Calton / Assistant Stage Manager | University of Melbourne, Russell St Theatre, Melbourne with Union Theatre Rep Co | |
| 1961 | The Lady's Not for Burning | | Russell St Theatre, Melbourne with Union Theatre Rep Co | |
| 1961–1962 | The One Day of the Year | Hughie | VIC & TAS tour with Union Theatre Rep Co | |
| 1962 | The Shifting Heart | | Russell St Theatre, Melbourne with Union Theatre Rep Co | |
| 1962 | Summer of the Seventeenth Doll | Johnnie | Russell St Theatre, Melbourne with Union Theatre Rep Co | |
| 1962 | The Ballad of Angel's Alley | | Russell St Theatre, Melbourne with Union Theatre Rep Co | |
| 1962 | Macbeth | Ross | University of Melbourne with Union Theatre Rep Co | |
| 1962 | The Season at Sarsaparilla | Ron Suddards | University of Melbourne with Union Theatre Rep Co | |
| 1962 | Ross | Turkish Sergeant / Grp-Capt Woods | University of Melbourne with Union Theatre Rep Co | |
| 1963 | Richard II | | University of Melbourne with Union Theatre Rep Co | |
| 1963 | Arms and the Man | | VIC country tour with Union Theatre Rep Co | |
| 1963 | The No Hopers | | VIC & QLD country tour with Union Theatre Rep Co | |
| 1963 | The End of the Beginning / Hello Out There! / The Black Horse / The Man in the Bowler Hat | | Russell St Theatre, Melbourne with Union Theatre Rep Co | |
| 1963 | The Devil's Disciple | Christy Dudgeon | University of Melbourne with Union Theatre Rep Co | |
| 1963–1964 | And the Big Men Fly | Achilles Jones | Russell St Theatre, Melbourne, Arts Theatre, Adelaide, VIC country tour with Union Theatre Rep Co | |
| 1964 | Critic's Choice | Dion Kapakos | University of Melbourne with Union Theatre Rep Co | |
| 1964 | Hamlet | Fransisco, Player, Fortinbras | University of Melbourne with Union Theatre Rep Co | |
| 1964 | Love Rides the Rails or Will the Mail Train Run Tonight? | | Russell St Theatre, Melbourne with Union Theatre Rep Co | |
| 1964 | All in Good Time | | St Martins Theatre, Melbourne | |
| 1964 | Angels in Love or The Perils of Purity | | St Martins Theatre, Melbourne | |
| 1964 | Alice in Wonderland | | Tivoli Theatre, Melbourne | |
| 1965 | Entertaining Mr Sloane | | Russell St Theatre, Melbourne with Union Theatre Rep Co | |
| 1965 | An Enemy of the People | | Russell St Theatre, Melbourne with Union Theatre Rep Co | |
| 1965 | Crime Passionnel | Bodyguard | St Martins Theatre, Melbourne | |
| 1966 | The Representative | | Russell St Theatre, Melbourne with Union Theatre Rep Co | |
| 1966 | War and Peace | | Russell St Theatre, Melbourne with Union Theatre Rep Co | |
| 1966 | The Royal Hunt of the Sun | | Russell St Theatre, Melbourne with Union Theatre Rep Co | |
| 1966 | The Young Wife | | Russell St Theatre, Melbourne with Union Theatre Rep Co & J. C. Williamson's | |
| 1966 | Private Yuk Objects | | Russell St Theatre, Melbourne, Phillip Theatre, Sydney | |
| 1967 | Luv | | St Martins Theatre, Melbourne | |
| 1967 | Where's Daddy? | Razz | St Martins Theatre, Melbourne | |
| 1968 | The Fire on the Snow | Evans | UNSW Old Tote Theatre, Sydney | |
| 1968 | Childermas | Knightly Gentleman | Her Majesty's Theatre, Brisbane with Old Tote Theatre Company | |
| 1968 | King Lear | Duke of Albany | Her Majesty's Theatre, Brisbane with Old Tote Theatre Company | |
| 1968 | Wait Until Dark | Mike | St Martins Theatre, Melbourne | |
| 1969 | This Story of Yours | Johnson | St Martins Theatre, Melbourne | |
| 1970 | Only an Orphan Girl or A Soul Redeemed | | St Martins Theatre, Melbourne | |
| 1972 | A Midsummer Night's Dream | | Scotch College, Adelaide with South Australian Theatre Company | |
| 1972 | Brumby Innes | Brumby Innes | Pram Factory, Melbourne with APG | |
| 1974 | Annie Storey | | St Martins Theatre, Melbourne with MTC | |
| 1976 | A Man for All Seasons | | Playhouse Perth with National Theatre | |
| 1976 | A Handful of Friends | Mark | Playhouse Perth with National Theatre | |
| 1976 | The Last of the Knucklemen | Horse | Playhouse Perth with National Theatre | |
| 1976 | Habeas Corpus | Mr Shanks | Playhouse Perth with National Theatre | |
| 1976 | Arsenic and Old Lace | Mortimer Brewster | Playhouse Perth with National Theatre | |
| 1976–1977 | Ashes | Colin Harding | Greenroom Theatre, Perth with National Theatre | |
| 1977 | The Miser | Master Jacques | Playhouse Perth with National Theatre | |
| 1977 | The Department | Hans | Playhouse Perth with National Theatre | |
| 1977 | Otherwise Engaged | Simon Hench | Playhouse Perth with National Theatre | |
| 1977 | Treats | Dave | Playhouse Perth with National Theatre | |
| 1977 | Yesterday's News | Terry | Greenroom Theatre, Perth | |
| 1983 | Gossip from the Forest | Marshall Foch | Sydney Opera House with STC | |
