= Tudawali =

- Written by: Alan Seymour; David Rapsey
- Directed by: Steve Jodrell
- Starring: Ernie Dingo; Peter Fisher; Frank Wilson; Charles Tingwell; Suzanne Peveril; Bill McCluskey; Michelle Torres
- Country of origin: Australia
- Original language: English

Production
- Producers: Paul Barron; Julia Overton
- Cinematography: Michael Edols
- Production company: SBS-Barron Films
- Budget: $750,000.

Original release
- Release: 28 January 1988

Tudawali is a 1988 made for television biographical film about Aboriginal Australian actor Robert Tudawali. The screenplay was by Alan Seymour. It was directed by Steve Jodrell, and stars Ernie Dingo in the title role.

Tudawali was released on DVD by Umbrella Entertainment in July 2010. The DVD is compatible with all region codes and includes special features such as a stills gallery, press clippings, a featurette entitled Walkabout and Oondamooroo: Profile of Ernie Dingo.

== Cast ==
- Ernie Dingo as Robert Tudawali
- Jedda Cole as Peggy Wilson
- Peter Fisher as Harry Wilkins
- Frank Wilson as Charles Chauvel
- Charles Tingwell as Doctor Rayment
- Michael Carman as Conroy
- Suzanne Peveril as Elsa Chauvel
- Bill McCluskey as Jack Everett
- Michelle Torres as Kate Wilson
