= Terry Dear =

Alexander George "Terry" Dear (4 October 1913 – 17 June 1995) was an Australian radio personality in the "Golden years of Australian AM radio", remembered as the last compere of Australia's Amateur Hour. Known for his affable personality, he made a moderately successful transition to television.

== History ==
Dear was born in Fitzroy North, Victoria, a son of James Kidd Dear (died 1952) and Annie Dear, née Bryan. He was educated to Intermediate level.

He set out as an Engineering student, but was more interested in a career in singing, taking lessons from Amelia Banks.

He began his radio career with Melbourne's 3KZ, as compere of a five-hour Saturday night program of dance music, though also claimed by 3AW.

During WWII he served in Lae, New Guinea, as announcer and OC with the rank of lieutenant in the Army radio station. In 1946, following his discharge, he was appointed production manager at 3AW.

He was introduced to the Amateur Hour audience by Harry Dearth on 24 August 1950, and took over as producer and compere when 2GB took over as host broadcaster from 2UW, the following week. Dear rated Angelina Arena as the show's most important "discovery", but other contestants include opera stars Donald Smith and Colin Grant, and performers Rolf Harris, Frank Ifield and Marie Tysoe.

He has been named as one of the 'Five D's of Australian Radio' with Jack Davey, Bob Dyer, John Dease and Harry Dearth. Unlike Davey and Dearth, Dear survived the transition to television. Dear was a well-known figure on Victorian television from its inception in 1957, as compere of the short-lived Amateur Hour and Leave It to the Girls. He had a daytime quiz program Concentration from 1960.

He left television, and in later life was a business executive with a large Sydney company.

== Personal ==
Dear married Phyllis Mary Farnan on 23 September 1940; their family included Alan (25 December 1941–4 March 1996), Tim (30 November 1944–4 March 2020), Ian (born 1949), Anne (born 1953). In 1940 they lived at 15 Chasleton Ave. Toorak, Victoria; in 1962 they had a home in Pymble, New South Wales.
