= Australia's Amateur Hour =

- Genre: Talent contest, variety entertainment
- Presented by: Harry Dearth; Dick Fair; Terry Dear; (Dear hosted both the radio and television version)
- Country of origin: Australia
- Original language: English

Production
- Production locations: Homebush West, Sydney

Original release
- Network: AWA (radio version); Seven Network and Nine Network (television version)
- Release: Radio: 1940 - 1958; Television: August 1957 - 1958

Australia's Amateur Hour is a talent quest, broadcast on Australian AM radio from 1940 to 1958, and a television spinoff, which ran for less than a year, 1957–1958.

The radio program began on Sydney's 2UW, compered by Harry Dearth, followed by Dick Fair, who developed it into Australia's most popular Sunday program, each week selecting ten contestants from around 100 hopefuls. From 24 August 1950 the show was broadcast on 2GB, produced and compered by Terry Dear. It was a popular, long-running, program on which many performers appeared.

The television version was also compered by Terry Dear, running from August 1957 to February 1958 on Sydney's TCN-9 and Melbourne's HSV-7. The success of the radio version didn't translate to its television cousin, which closed after only seven months, the radio version following shortly after.

== Episode status ==
Some episodes of the radio version are held by the National Film & Sound Archive. Although the television version was kinescoped so it could be shown in both Sydney and Melbourne, no copies are known to exist.

== See also ==
- List of Australian music television shows
