= Wind from the Icy Country =

- Based on: play by Robert Amos
- Directed by: Patrick Barton
- Country of origin: Australia
- Original language: English

Production
- Running time: 65 mins
- Production company: ABC

Original release
- Release: 19 August 1964 (Melbourne)
- Release: 30 September 1964
- Release: 16 September 1964 (Brisbane)

Wind from the Icy Country is a 1964 Australian television play directed by Patrick Barton and starring Norman Kaye.

== Premise ==
A German engineer, Ehrbar, who worked in China during the war encounters a Jewish doctor in an isolated Chinese mountain village in Paoshan, in the northwest. Ehrbar breaks down in a car with his companion, Ella, who is fleeing an unhappy marriage.

== Cast ==
- Brian James as Rachmann
- Norman Kaye as Ehrbar
- Patsy King as Ella
- Kurt Ludescher as Captain Kang
- Neil Curnow as lt Mah
- Dawn Klingberg
- Roly Barlee
- Ray Angel
- Joseph Szabo
- Douglas Kelly
- Clen Farmer
- Blaise Anthony

== Production ==
Robert Amos adapted his radio play. Amos described the story as a drama on conscience in the style of Kafka.

== Reception ==
The TV critic for The Sydney Morning Herald thought that it proved that "when a play is completely focused on the working out of intense human conflicts at close range, television proves to be an excellent medium... Brian James made the doctor into a tragic and moving figure consumed by the torture of past experience."
