= Shadow of the Vine =

- The General Motors Hour episode
- Episode no.: Season 3 Episode 5
- Directed by: Peter Cotes
- Teleplay by: Beverley Nichols
- Original air date: 7 October 1962
- Running time: 90 mins

Episode chronology
← Previous "Manhaul"	Next → "The Shifting Heart"

"Shadow of the Vine" is a 1962 Australian television play adapted from a 1949 play by Beverley Nichols. It aired on 7 October 1962 in Sydney and Melbourne, and on 3 June 1962 in Brisbane and Adelaide.

It was originally made for HSV-7 then presented as part of the General Motors Hour It was produced by Peter Cotes, who made four TV productions in Melbourne. Shadow of the Vine was the second one he made and the last one that aired. Cotes made it a year before it aired.

== Plot ==
Mark Heath is a once brilliant lawyer who has become an alcoholic, affecting his two sons, Julian and Arthur. Only his wife Lilian remains loyal.

== Cast ==
- W Edward Hodge as Mark Heath
- Sophie Stewart as Lilian Heath
- Mark Kelly as Arthur Heath
- Edward Brayshaw as Julian Heath
- Bettina Welch as Janet, Arthur's fiancee
- Ellis Irving as Dr James Ritchie
- Lorna Forbes
- Carole Potter

== Production ==
The original play by Beverley Nichols was based on Nichols' personal struggles in coming to terms with his father's alcoholism. The play had been performed on Australian stages and adapted for Australian radio.

It was one of four productions Cotes made in Australia in 1961 for HSV-7, the others being Long Distance, Suspect, and Candida. The first production shot was Long Distance which was filmed on 18 May 1961. Shadow of the Vine was the second play produced by Cotes. It ran for 90 minutes. The show was recorded live on 8 June 1961. Cotes made Candida then announced that his production operation was being wound up due to the credit freeze. He made one more production, Suspect, before leaving Australia. Cotes said he read 100 plays by Australian writers and considered making 2, both by Alan Seymour, but neither was made. Long Distance had been screened while Cotes was in Australia but the other three were not shown until 1962, by which time he had left the country.

== Reception ==
The Age TV reviewer praised "a sensitive performance by Sophie Stewart" and Hodge's "well-directed portrayal as a drink addicted father... Once again the Peter Cotes touch came through for me. Interesting it was to see how the inside of the house sets helped rather than hindered to put across the realism of the story. Contrast this use of space to the intimate sets usually preferred by some ABC producers... Pity the drama lesson by Peter Cotes, now ended, is in danger of being forgotten. There is no idea of a continuity in drama by HSV-7 in sight, I believe."
