= Peter Fisher (actor) =

Australian film and television actor

- Born: Katoomba, New South Wales, Australia
- Education: Sydney University (1974)
- Occupations: Actor, corporate trainer
- Years active: Acting (1972–2010); Corporate training (1994–present)
- Website: www.peterf.com.au

Peter Fisher is an Australian film and television actor who was most active in the period from the mid-1970s to the late-1990s.

== Early life ==
Born in Katoomba, New South Wales, Fisher studied architecture at Sydney University, graduating in 1974, but quickly segued into acting.

== Career ==
Fisher was most active as an actor from the mid-1970s to the late 1990s. His acting career began at Sydney's Nimrod Theatre Company alongside John Bell and Richard Wherrett.

Fisher is known for his ongoing role as Craig Bullpitt, the son of Ted Bullpitt (Ross Higgins) in Logie Award-winning Australian sitcom Kingswood Country from 1980 to 1984. It was a spin-off from a segment on the sketch show The Naked Vicar Show. In 1986 he played Bill Scott in outback drama miniseries Alice to Nowhere, alongside John Waters and Ruth Cracknell. The following year, he took on the role of Harry Wilkins in docudrama TV movie Tudawali, about the life of Indigenous actor, Robert Tudawali, with Ernie Dingo and Charles ‘Bud’ Tingwell.

Fisher then had a main role as David Trevaller in 1990 children's miniseries Elly & Jools, starring opposite Rebecca Smart and Clayton Williamson. He then appeared with Marcus Graham in 1991 miniseries Ratbag Hero, based on the book A Riverman's Story by Mik Kelsall.

From 1992 to 1993, Fisher played the leading role of solicitor Geoff Kennedy in comedy series My Two Wives, the story of a man who moves into an apartment with his new wife and her daughter, only to find his ex-wife and children are living in the apartment below. He also appeared with Peter Phelps in 1997 crime drama TV movie Reprisal, playing the role of Chandler. He later had a role in 2003 comedy film Danny Deckchair, opposite Rhys Ifans, playing Fire Captain Robbo.

Fisher appeared in guest roles on numerous series including Chopper Squad, The Flying Doctors, Rafferty's Rules, More Winners, A Country Practice, Boys from the Bush, Big Sky, Murder Call and Water Rats.

Fisher also appeared in various Australian TV commercials throughout the 1980s and 1990s, including the "A Whole New Kind of Softness" television campaign for Sorbent in 1988.

In the early 1990s, Fisher started to move into the area of corporate communications. In 1995, he created "Act One!" (Act One Theatre based Learning Pty Ltd), a Sydney company that specialises in corporate training and development. In the early 2000s, he became involved with the Australian Graduate School of Management, at University of New South Wales. particularly the Middle Manager Program. In 2011, he won the Australian School of Business Award for outstanding adjunct faculty program delivery.

== Personal life ==
Fisher lives in the coastal Sydney suburb of Tamarama, with his partner, son and daughter.

== Filmography ==
| Year | Title | Role | Notes | Ref. |
|---|---|---|---|---|
| 1979 | Chopper Squad | Jack | 1 episode | |
| 1980–1984 | Kingswood Country | Craig Bulpitt | 89 episodes | |
| 1983 | The Weekly's War | Davo | Miniseries | |
| 1984 | Five Mile Creek | Slim | 1 episode | |
| 1984 | Special Squad | French | 1 episode | |
| 1985 | Robbery | Williams | TV movie | |
| 1986 | Alice to Nowhere | Bill Scott | Miniseries, 2 episodes | |
| 1986 | The Flying Doctors | Johnnie | Episode: "Return of the Hero" | |
| 1987 | Richmond Hill | Ron Stacey | 4 episodes | |
| 1987 | Tudawali | Harry Wilkins | TV movie | |
| 1987 | Rafferty's Rules | Robbo | Episode: "Reason to Believe" | |
| 1988 | Rafferty's Rules | Ritchie McMahon | Episode: "Quantity of Mercy" | |
| 1988 | The Dirtwater Dynasty | Nevertire Lands Officer | Miniseries, 1 episode | |
| 1988 | Australians | Private Grimshaw | Anthology series, episode 2: "Private John Simpson" | |
| 1990 | More Winners | Bob | Episode: Second Childhood | |
| 1990 | Elly & Jools | David Trevaller | Miniseries, 12 episodes | |
| 1990 | The Flying Doctors | Phil Guthrie | Episode: "The Ties That Bind" | |
| 1991 | Ratbag Hero | Frank Kelso (Pop) | TV movie | |
| 1991–1993 | A Country Practice | Vince Bryant / Sean Thomas / Bluey McKay | 6 episodes | |
| 1992 | Boys from the Bush | Greg | 1 episode | |
| 1992–1993 | My Two Wives | Geoffrey Kennedy | 26 episodes | |
| 1997 | Big Sky | Detective Darren Taylor | 1 episode | |
| 1997 | Reprisal | Chandler | TV movie | |
| 1998 | Murder Call | Leonard Hertzberg | 1 episode | |
| 1998 | Water Rats | Bruce Johnson | 1 episode | |
| 2003 | Danny Deckchair | Fire Captain Robbo | Feature film | |
| 2010 | I, Spry | ASIS Officer | TV movie | |

== Theatre ==
| Year | Title | Role(s) | Theatre Co. | Ref. |
|---|---|---|---|---|
| 1973 | The Old Familiar Juice | | Playhouse, Perth with National Theatre | |
| 1973 | The House of Blue Leaves | | Playhouse, Perth with National Theatre | |
| 1973 | Jugglers Three | Dennis | Playhouse, Perth with National Theatre | |
| 1974 | Antony and Cleopatra | Varrius / Pacorus / Eros / Gallus | New Fortune Theatre, Perth with National Theatre | |
| 1974 | Magnificence | | Greenroom Theatre, Perth with National Theatre | |
| 1974 | Home | | Greenroom Theatre, Perth with National Theatre | |
| 1974 | The Servant of Two Masters | | Playhouse, Perth with National Theatre | |
| 1975 | Equus | Alan Strang | Playhouse, Perth with National Theatre | |
| 1975 | Crimes of Passion | | The Hole in the Wall Theatre | |
| 1975 | A Hard God | | Hole in the Wall Theatre with National Theatre | |
| 1975 | What If You Died Tomorrow? | | Playhouse with National Theatre | |
| 1975–1976 | Mates | | Nimrod, Sydney, Playhouse, Adelaide | |
| 1976 | Doctor Faustus | | St George's Cathedral, Perth with National Theatre | |
| 1977 | A Tentshow Pagliacci | | Nimrod, Sydney | |
| 1977 | Count Dracula | Renfield | Theatre Royal, Hobart with Tasmanian Theatre Co | |
| 1977 | Southern Ape | David | Greenroom Theatre, Perth with National Theatre | |
| 1978 | The RSL Show | | Whitehorse Pub Theatre, Sydney | |
| 1978 | The Mighty 1978 RSL Talent Quest | | Whitehorse Pub Theatre, Sydney | |
| 1978 | The Edna Lint Story | | Whitehorse Pub Theatre, Sydney | |
| 1978 | Done to Death | | Whitehorse Pub Theatre, Sydney | |
| 1978 | The Night of the Iguana | Hank | Sydney Opera House with Old Tote Theatre Co | |
| 1978 | The Lady from Maxim's | Lt Chamerot | Sydney Opera House with Old Tote Theatre Co | |
| 1979 | Under Milk Wood | | Civic Playhouse, Newcastle with Hunter Valley Theatre Co | |
| 1979 | The Miracle Worker | Captain Keller | Civic Playhouse, Newcastle with Hunter Valley Theatre Co | |
| 1980 | Pirates at the Barn | Sailor | Clark Island, Sydney with Nimrod | |
| 1980 | Danton's Death | Robespierre | Stables Theatre, Sydney with King O'Malley Theatre Co & Griffin Theatre Co | |
| 1982 | Little Red Riding Hood | | Her Majesty's Theatre, Sydney | |
| 1986 | Room to Move | | Stables Theatre, Sydney with Griffin Theatre Co | |
| 1988–1989 | Don’s Party | | Sydney Opera House, Melbourne Athenaeum | |
| 1991 | Gungies | | Performance Space, Sydney | |
| 1991 | South American Barbecue | | Belvoir, Sydney | |
| 1992 | The Deal | | Ensemble Theatre, Sydney | |
| 1993 | An Evening with Merv Hughes | | His Majesty's Theatre, Perth | |
| 1998 | Reverse, Pike / Lend Me a Tenor | Stage Manager | Kel Watson Theatre, Melbourne | |
