= The Trial and Torture of Sir John Rampayne =

- Wednesday Play episode
- Directed by: Peter Deguid
- Written by: Alan Seymour
- Original air date: November 10, 1965
- Running time: 75 mins

The Trial and Torture of Sir John Rampayne is a 1965 British television play by Alan Seymour. It starred Jack Hawkins who later wrote "For me, this was a personal trial and torture, for it was then I realised I had more than a sore throat; I had cancer."

== Premise ==
An elderly right-wing politician is kidnapped by a pop singer called Wolf, seemingly as part of a student prank. But his captors have a more alarming agenda.

== Cast ==
- Jack Hawkins as Sir John Rampayne
- Ian McKellen as Wolf
- Faith Brook as Eleanor Brinson
- Mary Hinton as Lady Rampayne
- Meredith Edwards as Roland Sloane
- Robert James as Denzil Trafford
- Morris Perry as Chief Superintendent James
- Sheila Ballantine as Dr. Scott-Studley

== Production ==
It was a rare television appearance for Jack Hawkins. Hawkins had suffered serious throat trouble since making League of Gentlemen and discovered he had throat cancer. It was treated and Hawkins resumed his career. Then he started losing his voice again while making The Guns at Batasi and the conditioned worsened. Rehearsing the TV play, Hawkins wrote "was a fearful trial and torture for me. Every rehearsal at the dreary drill hall in Wandsworth which we had hired became an act of endurance."

Two days before the show was to air Hawkins coughed up blood. He saw a doctor who thought it was a burst blood vessel. His doctors advised him to not speak at all but Hawkins insisted on completing the play.

"Someone stood in for me at the dress rehearsal of the TV play, but I was able to go through with the actual public performance, with the aid of pain-killing injections given to me by my throat specialist," wrote Hawkins.

Hawkins then filmed some episodes of Dr Kildare in Hollywood. His voice disintegrated further and he visited a throat specialist who diagnosed cancer. He would never speak again on screen using his own voice.

== Reception ==
Western Daily Press said Hawkins "did the best he could with a script which I trust he could follow better than I did."

The Daily Telegraph said "when it came to the crunch... we got a rewarding 30 minutes or so and admirable performances."

Hawkins' wife later wrote "it was a strange story and I rather hated it."

== Notes ==
- Hawkins, Jack (1973). Anything for a quiet life; the autobiography of Jack Hawkins.
