= A Break in the Music =

1966 play by Alan Seymour

- Original language: English
- Written by: Alan Seymour

Premiere
- Date: February 14, 1966
- Place: Playhouse Theatre, Perth
- Directed by: George Ogilvie

A Break in the Music is a 1966 Australian play by Alan Seymour. It was his first produced play following The One Day of the Year.

The play made its world premiere at the 1966 Perth Festival. Director George Ogilvie discussed the play with Seymour in London then went to Perth to direct it.

== Reception ==
The Bulletin called it "basically a good play, attractively fashioned in an untidy way. " The Sydney Morning Herald said "it seems more fitted for the TV than the stage."

The play was later given a season at Sydney's Independent Theatre in 1971. According to Leslie Rees, critics of the play had many of the same comments:

Lack of basic dramatic tension, reluctance of the scenes to hang together, an irritating self-consciousness of tone. At the same time they praised the author’s undoubted mastery of very natural and humorous dialogue, and some of the more earthy characterization. But the apparent purposelessness of existence, the loneliness of human beings, the mediocrity of life in general seemed to corrode the author’s spirit, without inspiring him to an adequate construction for the theatre.

Another academic, Alrene Sykes said the play "is in part so very good, and in part so bad, that one can only hope Alan Seymour will one day get round to rewriting it."

== Premise ==
A journalist returns to his hometown to write a novel and remembers the past.
