= Donny Johnson (play) =

1961 play by Alan Seymour

- Written by: Alan Seymour
- Original language: English

Donny Johnson is a 1961 Australian play by Alan Seymour. It was one of four plays to win a prize in the 1960 General Motors Holden playwriting competition.

== Background ==
It has been called, "a macabre version of the Don Juan story, the hero, pop singer Donny Johnson, ruthlessly exploiting his glamour and sexuality till he is brought to an appalling measure of justice."

Leslie Rees called it:

"a satire on the hysteria of teen-age fans when confronted by a magnetic pop singer and the resulting megalomania of the benighted hero himself—observe the resemblance in his name to Don Giovanni! The play won a prize in a competition, but failed to find production, possibly because of over frank statements but more likely because it was inadequately worked out."

The play was adapted for radio in Finland.
