= Stockbrokers Are Smashing: But Bankers Are Better =

- Blackmail episode
- Episode no.: Season 1 Episode 14
- Directed by: Joan Kemp-Welch
- Written by: Alan Seymour
- Original air date: December 10, 1965 (intended)
- Running time: 60 mins

Stockbrokers Are Smashing: But Bankers Are Better is a 1965 British television play by Alan Seymour. It was meant to be the final play in the Blackmail series.

== Banning ==
The play was scheduled for broadcast but pulled from transmission at twelve hours' notice due to concerns over its sexual content and was placed with a show about Marilyn Monroe. The script had been approved but the production was held back by Cyril Bennett, Director of Programmes for Rediffusion.

Seymour later said the play was banned because the executive objected to the opening sado-masochistic scene: "I have never seen it as I'd left the country before it went into rehearsal. God knows what the director did with the scene which (I thought we'd adequately discussed tone and treatment) was meant to be a gentle parody of heavy-breathing pornography with a sweet, confused middle-aged man as victim to the later purely mental sadism of a sexy young girl."

== Premise ==
Dorice blackmails Charles Watson along with her boyfriend.

== Cast ==
- Derek Francis as Charles Watson
- Annette Robertson as Dorice
- Ronald Lacey as 'Beat'
- Tenniel Evans as The Professor
- Angela Bame as Mrs. Goldoni
- Stella Bonheur as Mrs. Watson
- Ray Marioni as The head waiter
- Michael Shannon as Waiter
