= Snake Gully with Dad and Dave =

Television series

- Genre: comedy
- Written by: Ralph Peterson
- Directed by: Hugh Taylor
- Starring: Gordon Chater; Garry McDonald; Marion Edward; Noel Ferrier; Diane Craig
- Country of origin: Australia
- Original language: English

Original release
- Network: ATN-7
- Release: 25 February – 12 December 1972

Snake Gully with Dad 'N' Dave is a Seven Network 1972 television series, comprising 13 episodes based on characters created by Steele Rudd.

It was adapted from the radio series Dad and Dave from Snake Gully rather than Rudd's stories. The original title "Dad 'N' Dave" could not be used due to copyright. 'Snake Gully' referred to the (fictional) location of the Rudds' farm.

The series featured an instrumental version of "The Road to Gundagai" as its theme. A vocal version of the song had been the theme of the radio series which preceded it.

The network constructed eight in-house sets; exterior scenes were filmed in and around Riverstone and Windsor, New South Wales.

The series was created and produced by Ralph Peterson, who also wrote some of the scripts with Ken Shadie. Peterson had conceived and written the sitcom My Name's McGooley, What's Yours? and cast Gordon Chater in the role of Dan Rudd - 'Dad'. His son Dave was played by Garry McDonald, in his first ongoing television role. The pilot's cast also included Marion Edward as Sarah Rudd ('Mum'), Robert McDarra as neighbour Bill Smith and his daughter Mabel played by Michelle Fawdon. Supporting players included John Armstrong as Uncle Clarence and Buster Fiddess as Ted Hamilton.

A regular series was commissioned following the pilot episode but cast changes were necessary. Fiddess had died in January 1972; he was replaced by Noel Ferrier, Armstrong by Harry Lawrence and, as Fawdon had been cast in a production of Jesus Christ Superstar, Mabel was played by actress Diane Craig - who, coincidentally, was Garry McDonald's wife. Another actor featuring in the series was Redmond Phillips as the Mayor.

The series was filmed in colour. Chater later wrote 'We were working on E-Cam - a new colour-television process of filming simultaneously on three cameras, which gave the final edited product more of a movie look.

At the time Snake Gully premiered in August 1972, Chater, Edwards and McDonald were appearing in a revue, The Mavis McMahon Show at the Macleay Theatre.

The series was cancelled after one season; Peterson won an AWGIE award for one episode. Chater was of the opinion that the series' failure was due to Channel 7 programmers moving its time slot three times in its first three weeks. 'So that was the end of Dad and Dave.' he wrote. 'It must still be in the Channel 7 archives and might be a pleasant surprise if someone looked at it today.'

== Cast ==
- Garry McDonald as Dave
- Gordon Chater as Dan Rudd (Dad)
- Marion Edward as Sarah Rudd (Mum)
- Robert McDarra as Bill Smith
- Michele Fawdon / Diane Craig as Mabel Smith
- John Armstrong / Harry Lawrence as Uncle Clarence
- Buster Fiddess / Noel Ferrier as Ted Hamilton
- Les Foxcroft as Father Colquhoun
- Maggie Kirkpatrick
