= The Grey Nurse Said Nothing (The General Motors Hour) =

- The General Motors Hour episode
- Episode no.: Season 1 Episode 1
- Directed by: David Cahill
- Teleplay by: Sumner Locke Elliott
- Cinematography by: M. J. Cleary; Doug Hampson; K. Burton
- Original air date: 28 May 1960
- Running time: 90 mins

Episode chronology
← Previous —	Next → "This is Television"

"The Grey Nurse Said Nothing" is a television play episode from the Australian television series The General Motors Hour. It was produced and directed by David Cahill, and is based on the real life murder of Jim Smith, the so-called Shark Arm case. It was made by Channel Seven who later called "the most ambitious dramatic production ever attempted in Australia... [written by] one of the world's foremost authors of television plays and the cast is Ihe largest ever assembled for an Australian television dramatic production.... the greatest care has been taken to achieve the maximum possible standard in the production of the play which covered a total period of approximately eight weeks." The episode aired on 28 May 1960 in Sydney and Melbourne, and on 11 June 1960 in Brisbane.

== Plot ==
The play opens at a coroner's inquest into the death of a woman witness in a murder trial. While preparing to give evidence, a witness recalls the trial of a man twelve years earlier in Cairns, Queensland.

The man is Herbert Wills who was accused of the murder of boatman Patrick Ahearn, whose arm was found in a shark. Further evidence given by other witnesses recalls other incidents in the trial.

Wills was charged with murder after a local fisherman captured a shark and sold it to an aquarium; ten days later the shark disgorged an arm which was idenitified via a tattoo mark as that of Patrick Ahearn. The rest of the body was never found.

Wills has a wife, Laura, and sister Hazel. Laura has come from England to live in Queensland and is lonely. She becomes an alcoholic and would get drinks off Ahearn. Hazel is a middle aged school mistress, the daughter of "Ma" Willis who runs an illegal betting business behind the cafe she owns.

== Cast ==
- Frank Waters as Herbert Mason Wills
- Lyndall Barbour as the Hazel Wills
- Guy Doleman as Patrick Ahearn
- Pamela Page as Laura Wills
- Nigel Lovell as narrator, Reverend Light
- Nancye Stewart as Ma Wills
- Lou Vernon as Cobber McGill
- Jacqueline Kott as Mavis Greenop
- Ric Hutton as Michael Scott-Finley
- Moray Powell as Mr Crane
- Kenneth Goodlet as Mr Croaker
- Gordon Glenwright as Dr Lloyd Angell
- Sandra Harris as Peggy Parsons
- Ron Shand as George Clamsby
- Reg Lye a Snowy Bingham
- Malcolm Billings as Bluey Davis (man)
- Harald Scruby as Bluey Davis (boy)
- Charles Tasman as Judge
- Ken Fraser as coroner
- John Barnard as clerk
- John Fegan as Tiger Bendroit
- Ossie Wenban as Waiter
- Vaughan Tracey as Jury Foreman
- Jack Ford as policeman
- Stephen Orszaczky as child
- Brett Hart as child

== Production ==
In February 1960, ATN 7 announced they were making a new show, General Motors Hour, sponsored by General Motors, in conjunction with GTV 9, Melbourne, QTQ9 Brisbane, and NWS 9 Adelaide, starting in May. It was to be presented by Harry Dearth and consist of two drama specials and one documentary. Their first production was to be a production of The Grey Nurse Said Nothing. ATN purchased the rights to the play in February 1960 - they had the right to broadcast it for 60 days from the premiere. It was the first time a script from Playhouse 90 had been adapted for Australian television and involved the largest cast ever assembled for an ATN 7 teledrama, with 20 speaking parts and 40 extras.

Director David Cahill and set designer Geoff Wedlock flew to Cairns to take photographs and sketches of the courthouse where the trial took place in the story. The courthouse was reproduced at ATN 7's studios in Epping. The scenes outside the courtroom were filmed before small mobile sets such as a barroom, a bedroom, a schoolroom and a beach picnic. The lighting in the courtroom was dimmed when these scenes were reached in the play and the small sets were spotlighted. The cast had a month of rehearsals, including three weeks of "dry runs" in a city rehearsal studio, before it was finally recorded on videotape on 23 April 1960.

The four leads were cast by March.

The dress rehearsal was played back to the cast and crew to give them a chance to correct any possible mistakes.

The cost of the play was over £4,000, £3,500 of which was provided by the advertiser. The cost of buying the rights to screen a film at this time was estimated at £500.

Future writer Ken Shadie did audio.

Scenes of its production were seen in the documentary This Is Television.

== Legal action ==
Patrick Brady, who was tried and acquitted in the actual Shark Arm case, sought an injunction restraining ATN Channel 7 from televising a court scene from the play. The scene had been shown in advertisements, in which a witness being examined by a barrister was describing how a shark that had been caught and placed in an aquarium had disgorged a human arm. Mr Brady argued that the scene was not a fair and accurate and recent report of his trial. He also argued that the fact the accused in the play was found not guilty by the jury would further defame him.

ATN 7 Sydney argued that it would cost them £403 if the telecast did not take place and would lose £3,500 if the play was not telecast on any of the other stations upon which it was proposed to be telecast on 28 May 1960, including stations in Brisbane, Melbourne, Adelaide and Perth.

== Release ==
The show aired on ATN at 9 pm on Saturday night.

The critic for the Sydney Morning Herald thought "the conventional materials of courtroom melodrama are worked over neatly, but without special distinction in talk or characterisation" in the play which featured "a cast that was not only huge in numbers but rich in talent." He added that director Cahills' "management of these big numbers, and the inventiveness by which he managed 'flashbacks' from courtroom to various Queensland scenes within a single studio, were an exciting break through the usual space and time limitations confining any live television play. The play itself... was generally very secure, though lacking the final polish needed to minimise the superficiality of much of it."

The Age said "an exciting story was told and viewers were intrigued by it all."

Filmink called it "a first-rate piece of melodrama, with an excellent script from Elliott...David Cahill and his crew do an excellent job of realising the writer’s vision: the multiple cameras move around with skill and speed, close ups are judiciously used, the lighting is excellent, the scene changes quick. The production values are tremendous, and most of the cast are outstanding... it’s a splendid piece of television, bold, entertaining, and interesting to watch, and all associated with it had every right to be proud. "

== See also ==
- List of television plays broadcast on ATN-7
