= The Concert (The General Motors Hour) =

- The General Motors Hour episode
- Episode no.: Season 2 Episode 1
- Directed by: Rod Kinnear
- Teleplay by: George F. Kerr
- Based on: Play by Joseph Schull
- Original air date: 3 June 1961
- Running time: 60 mins

Episode chronology
| ← Previous "Shadow of a Pale Horse" | Next → "The Mystery of a Hansom Cab" |

"The Concert" is a 1961 episode of The General Motors Hour television series, directed by Rod Kinnear at GTV-9s Melbourne studios. Australian TV drama was relatively rare at the time. The episode aired on 3 June 1961 in Melbourne, and on 10 June 1961 in Brisbane.

== Plot ==
Anne is a nurse who is blinded in an air raid during World War Two. Her aim is to move back to France to the village where she was blinded and help blind people. Determined to be independent, she originally lives with her sister Jenny then moves in to her own apartment. While Jenny is away for two weeks, Anne falls for one of her upstairs neighbours, a writer called Jennings, not knowing he is black. Jennings decides not to tell Anne he is black and moves away. He tells his friend Standish about the affair.

== Cast ==
- Ruth Gower as Anne Rivers
- Chester Harriott as Richard Jennings
- Yvonne Heaslip as Jenny Rivers
- Barbara Brandon as mother
- Cyril Gardner as father
- Moira Carleton as Matron
- Arthur Duncan as Steve
- Donna Duncan as Ella
- George Fairfax as Standish
- Lewis Taggart as landlord

== Production ==
The play had originally been written as a radio play. The play had been filmed several times in England, including once with Moira Lister in 1954 and once with Diane Cilento.

The stars of the play were an English actor, Ruth Gower, and three black American actors, Chester Harriott, Arthur Duncan and his wife Donna. Ruth Gower had come to Australia in 1960 to appear on stage opposite Basil Rathbone in Merry Go Round. It was filmed in Melbourne in October 1960, while Gower was acting at the Princess Theatre in the play. Chester Harriott was then touring Melbourne doing a song-and-piano act with Vic Evans.

== Reception ==
The TV reviewer for The Sydney Morning Herald said that "a number of sets and some individuality in acting could not altogether bind this drama together as firmly as one would wish." Although the script had "its moments of pathos" and "some powerful (if repetitive) things to say about black-white relationships", Ruth Gower "hardly varied her two expressions — of hesitant humour and of proud stubbornness — and she was not able to show fully the qualities the Negro writer finds so compelling" and "the feeling of precise locality varied from scene to scene" and "one missed an abundance of fine, full close-ups—something that cannot be compensated for by any number of sets."

== See also ==
- List of television plays broadcast on ATN-7
