= Ratbag Hero =

- Written by: Sonia Borg
- Directed by: Oscar Whitbread; Geoffrey Pollock
- Starring: Cameron Nugent; Elaine Smith; Peter Fisher; Marcus Graham
- Country of origin: Australia
- Original language: English
- No. of episodes: 2 x 2 hours

Production
- Producer: Oscar Whitbread

Original release
- Network: Seven Network
- Release: 10 March 1991 – 1991

Ratbag Hero is a 1991 Australian mini series based on the book A Riverman's Story by Mik Kelsall. It stars Cameron Nugent as Mick Kelsall, along with Elaine Smith, Peter Fisher and Marcus Graham. Also appearing were Marion Edward and a then 7 year old Matthew Ketteringham. The series was nominated for the 1991 AFI Award for Best Miniseries or Telefeature (or Short Run Series)

== Cast ==
- Cameron Nugent as Mick
- Elaine Smith as Mum
- Peter Fisher as Pop
- Marcus Graham as Unc
- Marion Edward as Gran
- Matthew Ketteringham as Frizzy
- Simon Chilvers as Baldy
- Tony Briggs as Jimmy
- Reg Evans as Cocky Brown
- Terry Gill as Skipper
- Gus Mercurio as Referee
