= Marion Edward =

Australian actress

- Occupation: Actress
- Years active: 1957–1994
- Known for: Roadgames (1981); The Wild Duck (1984); Snake Gully with Dad and Dave (1972)

Marion Edward is an Australian actress of theatre, television and film.

== Early life ==
Edward started in amateur theatre at the age of 14, which she continued while undertaking a career in kindergarten teaching and nursing. She made the leap to professional theatre, when she began performing in productions with the Union Theatre Repertory Company in Melbourne (the precursor to Melbourne Theatre Company).

== Career ==
Edward appeared on stage in numerous plays including The Ballad of Angel's Alley (1962) with Union Theatre Repertory Company, The Golden Oldies (1977) with Hoopla Theatre Foundation and The Newspaper of Claremont Street (1991–1992) with Playbox Theatre Company. She had lead roles in Blithe Spirit, The Importance of Being Earnest (1961), The Man Who Came to Dinner (1963), Come Back, Little Sheba (1970) and The Man from Mukinupin (1981).

Her singing abilities saw her perform in stage musicals including Hello, Dolly! (1965), Oliver! (1966) Razza-Ma-Tazz (1968), playing the lead role in the latter. Her performance in a Melbourne Theatre Company production of The Effect of Gamma Rays on Man-in-the-Moon Marigolds won her a 1970 Erik Award for Best Actress.

Edward worked regularly in television, on shows including Cop Shop, Bellbird and A Taste for Blue Ribbons. In 1967, she acted in new ABC children’s series Adventure Island. in two guest roles. She played eight different one-off characters in Homicide between 1964 and 1975. She had a significant role in 1972 series Snake Gully with Dad and Dave. She played the manipulative Mount Eliza journalist Madeleine Finlay in The Box. She played the recurring guest roles of Mrs Reid and Betty Beeton in Prisoner. She made numerous comedy appearances on The Paul Hogan Show.

Edward also appeared in film, including 1981 Ozplotation thriller Roadgames, which saw her nominated for an AFI Award for Best Actress in a Supporting Role. Her other film credits include Blue Fire Lady (1977), Strikebound (1984) and The Wild Duck (1984).

== Awards ==
| Year | Work | Award | Category | Result | Ref. |
|---|---|---|---|---|---|
| 1970 | The Effect of Gamma Rays on Man-in-the-Moon Marigolds | Erik Awards | Best Actress | Won | |
| 1981 | Roadgames | Australian Film Institute Awards | AFI Award for Best Actress in a Supporting Role | Nominated | |

== Filmography ==
=== Film ===
| Title | Year | Role | Type | Ref. |
|---|---|---|---|---|
| 1977 | Blue Fire Lady | Mrs. Gianini | Feature film | |
| 1979 | Evictions | Neighbour | Short film | |
| 1981 | Roadgames | Frita | Feature film | |
| 1984 | The Wild Duck | Mrs. Summers | Feature film | |
| 1984 | Strikebound | Meg | Feature film | |

=== Television ===
| Title | Year | Role | Type | Ref. |
|---|---|---|---|---|
| 1963 | Consider Your Verdict | Myra Fuller | 1 episode | |
| 1964 | Corruption in the Palace of Justice | | TV film | |
| 1964–1975 | Homicide | Rose Harris / Pearl Brewer / Millie Norton / Frau Gauchart / The Landlady / Lenice Charlwood / Mrs. Harris / Henrietta Cummings | 8 episodes | |
| 1965 | Romanoff and Juliet | Evdokia | TV play | |
| 1966 | Plain Jane | | TV play | |
| 1967 | Adventure Island | Dodo Panda / Matilda Mouse | 2 episodes | |
| 1967 | Hey You! | Miss Spain | 2 episodes | |
| 1969 | Good Morning, Mr. Doubleday | | 1 episode | |
| 1969 | Joan and Leslie | | 1 episode | |
| 1969–1973 | Division 4 | Elsie / Joyce Thompson / Jenny Smith / Betty / Alice Marsh / Elizabeth Cooper / Merle Stacey | 7 episodes | |
| 1970 | The Long Arm | Mollie Marker / Mrs. Fleming | 2 episodes | |
| 1971; 1972 | Matlock Police | Joy Miller / Elsie Burke | 2 episodes | |
| 1972 | Dust or Polish? | Mrs. Dibble | TV film | |
| 1972 | Matlock Police | Dulcie Stevens | 1 episode | |
| 1972 | Snake Gully with Dad and Dave | Sarah Rudd (Mum) | 8 episodes | |
| 1973 | Chaser | | TV pilot | |
| 1974 | Ryan | Alice Davis | 1 episode | |
| 1974 | The End Product | Miss Lardo | TV play | |
| 1976 | Bellbird | Harriet Downs | 3 episodes | |
| 1977 | Bluey | Matron | 1 episode | |
| 1978 | Against the Wind | Matron Purdy | Miniseries, 1 episode | |
| 1978–1981 | Cop Shop | Mrs. Tait / Mrs. McGurk / Mrs. Margot Thomas | 3 episodes | |
| 1979–1984 | The Paul Hogan Show | Various characters | | |
| 1981 | I Can Jump Puddles | Mrs. Bronson | Miniseries, 1 episode | |
| 1981; 1983 | Prisoner | Mrs. Reid / Betty Beeton | 2 episodes / 7 episodes | |
| 1983–1991 | A Country Practice | Di Fenwick / Sylvia Noland / Desdemona Deagher | 5 episodes | |
| 1984 | Carson's Law | Una Miller | 1 episode | |
| 1985 | Zoo Family | Mona Vale | 1 episode | |
| 1987 | The Petrov Affair | Mrs. Munro | Miniseries, 2 episodes | |
| 1988 | Raw Silk | Judge 1 | TV movie | |
| 1988 | Spit MacPhee | Sister Campbell | TV movie | |
| 1991 | Ratbag Hero | Gran | Miniseries, 2 episodes | |
| 1994 | Halfway Across the Galaxy and Turn Left | Miss Brewster | 6 episodes | |

== Theatre ==
| Title | Year | Role | Notes | Ref. |
|---|---|---|---|---|
| 1957 | A Sleep of Prisoners | Stage Manager | University of Melbourne with Union Theatre Repertory Company | |
| 1958 | The Crucible | | Melbourne Little Theatre | |
| 1959 | Orpheus Descending | Beulah Binnings | University of Melbourne with Union Theatre Repertory Company | |
| 1959 | Moby Dick—Rehearsed | Lady of the Company / Assistant Stage Manager | Elizabethan Theatre, Sydney, University of Melbourne with Union Theatre Repertory Company | |
| 1959 | The Waltz of the Toreadors | Eugenie / Assistant Stage Manager | University of Melbourne with Union Theatre Repertory Company | |
| 1959 | Arms and the Man | Assistant Stage Manager | University of Melbourne with Union Theatre Repertory Company | |
| 1959 | The Party | Assistant Stage Manager | University of Melbourne with Union Theatre Repertory Company | |
| 1959 | Venus Observed | Assistant Stage Manager | University of Melbourne with Union Theatre Repertory Company | |
| 1959 | The Rape of the Belt | Assistant Stage Manager | University of Melbourne with Union Theatre Repertory Company | |
| 1959 | The Ghost Train | Miss Bourne / Assistant Stage Manager | University of Melbourne with Union Theatre Repertory Company | |
| 1959–1960 | Sweeney Todd | Cloe / Assistant Stage Manager | University of Melbourne with Union Theatre Repertory Company | |
| 1960 | Prisoners' Country | Aboriginal Woman / Assistant Stage Manager | University of Melbourne with Union Theatre Repertory Company | |
| 1960 | The Entertainer | Assistant Stage Manager | University of Melbourne with Union Theatre Repertory Company | |
| 1960 | Look Who's Here! | Assistant Stage Manager | Russell St Theatre, Melbourne, with Union Theatre Repertory Company | |
| 1960 | Roots | Jenny Beales / Assistant Stage Manager | University of Melbourne with Union Theatre Repertory Company | |
| 1960 | She Stoops to Conquer | Assistant Stage Manager | University of Melbourne with Union Theatre Repertory Company | |
| 1960 | Visit to a Small Planet | Assistant Stage Manager | University of Melbourne with Union Theatre Repertory Company | |
| 1960 | A Taste of Honey | Stage Manager | University of Melbourne with Union Theatre Repertory Company | |
| 1960 | Man and Superman | Miss Ramsden / Stage Manager | University of Melbourne with Union Theatre Repertory Company | |
| 1960 | See How They Run | Sgt Towers / Stage Manager | University of Melbourne with Union Theatre Repertory Company | |
| 1961 | The Mystery of a Hansom Cab | Rosanna Moore / Stage Manager | University of Melbourne, Russell St Theatre, Melbourne, with Union Theatre Repertory Company | |
| 1961 | The Importance of Being Earnest | Stage Manager | University of Melbourne with Union Theatre Repertory Company | |
| 1961 | Five Finger Exercise | Stage Manager | Russell St Theatre, Melbourne, with Union Theatre Repertory Company | |
| 1961 | The Lady's Not for Burning | Actor / Stage Manager | Russell St Theatre, Melbourne, with Union Theatre Repertory Company | |
| 1961 | The One Day of the Year | Stage Manager | Russell St Theatre, Melbourne, with Union Theatre Repertory Company | |
| 1961–1962 | Oliver! | Widow Corney | Her Majesty's Theatre, Melbourne, Theatre Royal Sydney with J. C. Williamson's | |
| 1962 | The Ballad of Angel's Alley | | Russell St Theatre, Melbourne, with Union Theatre Repertory Company | |
| 1962 | The Aspern Papers | Assunta | University of Melbourne with Union Theatre Repertory Company | |
| 1962 | The Fantasticks | Crew | University of Melbourne with Union Theatre Repertory Company | |
| 1962 | The Season at Sarsaparilla | Mavis Knott | Union Theatre, Melbourne | |
| 1963 | The Man Who Came to Dinner | | Russell St Theatre, Melbourne, with Union Theatre Repertory Company | |
| 1963 | End of the Beginning / Hello Out There! / The Black Horse / The Man in the Bowler Hat | | Russell St Theatre, Melbourne, with Union Theatre Repertory Company | |
| 1963 | Goodnight Mrs Puffin | Annie | Comedy Theatre, Melbourne with J. C. Williamson's | |
| 1964 | The New Moon | Clotilde Lombaste | Palais Theatre, Melbourne, with Australian National Theatre | |
| 1964 | The Golden Legion of Cleaning Women | | Russell St Theatre, Melbourne, with Union Theatre Repertory Company | |
| 1965 | Hello, Dolly! | Ernestina / Ermengarde | Her Majesty's Theatre, Sydney, Her Majesty's Theatre, Melbourne & NZ tour with J. C. Williamson's | |
| 1966 | Oliver! | Mrs Corney, the Matron | Her Majesty's Theatre, Melbourne, Her Majesty's Theatre, Adelaide, His Majesty's Theatre, Perth, Canberra Theatre with J. C. Williamson's | |
| 1968 | Oh, What a Lovely War! | The Pierrots | St Martins Theatre, Melbourne | |
| 1968 | Razza-Ma-Tazz (and All That Jazz) | Madame Zinia | Southland Auditorium, Melbourne with Circle Productions / Godfrey Productions | |
| 1969 | Have You Any Dirty Washing Mother Dear? | | St Martins Theatre, Melbourne | |
| 1969 | The Rope Dancers | Mrs Farrow | St Martins Theatre, Melbourne | |
| 1970 | The Effect of Gamma Rays on Man-in-the-Moon Marigolds | | Russell St Theatre, Melbourne, with MTC | |
| 1970 | Come Back, Little Sheba | Lola | St Martin's Theatre, Melbourne | |
| 1970–1971 | All's Well That Ends Well | Widow of Florence | Princess Theatre, Melbourne, Canberra Theatre, Octagon Theatre, Perth with MTC | |
| 1971 | The Contractor | | Russell St Theatre, Melbourne, Canberra Theatre with MTC | |
| 1971 | The Inspector General | Cameo roles | Russell St Theatre, Melbourne with MTC | |
| 1971 | King Lear | | Russell St Theatre, Melbourne with MTC | |
| 1971 | The Recruiting Officer | | Russell St Theatre, Melbourne with MTC | |
| 1971 | Three Months Gone | | Russell St Theatre, Melbourne with MTC | |
| 1972 | The Mavis McMahon Show; or, Not on the Box | | Macleay Theatre, Sydney | |
| 1973 | Cowardy Custard | | St Martins Theatre, Melbourne | |
| 1973 | Come Blow Your Horn | Mrs Baker | St Martins Theatre, Melbourne | |
| 1974 | Guys and Dolls | Big Jule | Total Theatre, Melbourne | |
| 1976 | Queen Elizabeth Mark I | Good Queen Beth | Dirty Dick's Theatre Restaurant, Melbourne | |
| 1977 | Golden Oldies | Robbie / Morah | VCA Grant Street Theatre, Melbourne with Hoopla Theatre Foundation | |
| 1978–1979 | Once a Catholic | Mother Basil | Russell St Theatre, Melbourne, with MTC | |
| 1979–1980 | In Duty Bound | | Melbourne Athenaeum, Russell St Theatre, Melbourne, with MTC | |
| 1980 | Hobson's Choice | Mrs Hepworth | Melbourne Athenaeum with MTC | |
| 1980 | The Man Who Came to Dinner | Miss Preen | Melbourne Athenaeum with MTC | |
| 1981 | The Good Person of Setzuan | God | Melbourne Athenaeum with MTC | |
| 1981 | The Man from Mukinupin | | Russell St Theatre, Melbourne, with MTC | |
| 1982 | The Floating World | Irene Harding | Russell St Theatre, Melbourne, with MTC | |
| 1983 | 84 Charing Cross Road | | Russell St Theatre, Melbourne, with MTC | |
| 1983 | Morning’s at Seven | | Marian St Theatre, Sydney | |
| 1983 | In Duty Bound | | Marian St Theatre, Sydney | |
| 1984 | Medea | | Playhouse, Melbourne with MTC | |
| 1991–1992 | The Newspaper of Claremont Street | Nastasya | Victorian tour with Playbox Theatre Company | |
