= Good Morning Mr Doubleday =

- Starring: Gerry Gallagher; Katy Wild; Kay Eklund
- Country of origin: Australia
- No. of episodes: 26

Production
- Producer: Ron Way
- Production company: Fremantle International

Original release
- Release: 1969 – 1969

Good Morning Mr Doubleday is a black and white 1969 Australian TV sitcom set in a high school, which ran for 26 episodes.

== Synopsis ==
The series, based on US sitcom Mister Peepers, centres around science teacher Robinson Doubleday (Gerry Gallagher), his students and fellow teachers at Kannabri High School, in country Victoria.

== Cast ==
=== Main ===
- Gerry Gallagher as Robinson Doubleday (science teacher)
- Katy Wild as Jenny Hamilton (home economics teacher)
- Kay Eklund as Beryl Garney (English teacher)
- William Hodge as Principal Bates
- Allan Lander as Wes 'Tobe' Tobin (history teacher)
- Robert Brockman as Walter Murdock (student)
- Naomi Swart as Madeline Donetti (student)
- Mary Hardy as Phyllis McTaggart

=== Guests ===
- Barbara Brandon as Mrs Hamilton (1 episode)
- Barry Creyton as Clarence (1 episode)
- Carl Bleazby (2 episodes)
- David Atkins as Percival Allnutt (1 episode)
- Dennis Miller as Charlie Wilson (1 episode)
- Diana McLean as Debbie (1 episode)
- James Smillie (1 episode)
- Joy Mitchell as Sandra Hunter (4 episodes)
- Marion Edward (1 episode)
- Moira Carleton as Mrs Doubleday (1 episode)
- Owen Weingott (1 episode)
- Patsy King as Bridget O'Connor (1 episode)
- Tom Oliver (1 episode)
- Tony Bazell as Mr Hamilton (2 episodes)
- Ralph Baker as 'Deadly Earnest' (1 episode)

== Episodes ==
No. overall	No. in season	Title	Directed by	Written by	Original release date
1	1	"Back to School"	Unknown	Unknown	February 8, 1969
Doubleday is so immersed in his work he doesn't seem to notice Jenny, the pretty young home science teacher.
2	2	"Poor Butterfly"	Ron Way	Unknown	April 27, 1969
Doubleday catches a rare butterfly while out in nature. A famous collector offers him a large sum of money to mount it.
3	3	"The Roneo Machine is Mightier than the Sword"	Ron Way	Unknown	February 16, 1969
The principal discovers an article in the school newspaper criticising the administration. Doubleday, who believes in freedom of the press, refuses to remove the article, butting heads with his department.
4	4	"All You Need is an Honest Face"	Ron Way	TBA	TBA
Jenny goes on a date with her former boyfriend, Charlie, in a fancy sports car. Looking to impress her, Doubleday buys a big car from the local car dealer.
5	5	"Debbie's Party"	Ron Way	Unknown	March 30, 1969
Jenny feels threatened by the arrival of Mrs. Garney's niece Debbie, as she has much in common with Doubleday. Tobe and Doubleday and their partners are invited to a party for Debbie.
6	6	"Bronze Bird"	Ron Way	Unknown	March 2, 1969
Doubleday heads to Melbourne when he is honoured with the 'Bronze Bird' award for his research into the life of the sparrow.
7	7	"Queen to Mate"	Ron Way	Unknown	April 5, 1969
Doubleday and Tobe are representing Kannabri High in the annual chess tournament. The school has had a winning streak for 20 years, however, bad timing strikes as Tobe falls ill.
8	8	"Coup de Presse"	Ron Way	Unknown	July 8, 1969
Doubleday's engagement to Jenny is accidentally announced in by Buzz, the writer for the school newspaper.
9	9	"A Friend in Need"	Ron Way	Unknown	April 20, 1969
When an old army friend comes to town, Doubleday finds his relationship with Jenny in jeopardy.
10	10	"A Picture is Worth a Thousand Words"	Ron Way	Unknown	March 23, 1969
Doubleday hires 'Clarence of Hollywood' to take a portrait of Jenny as a surprise. Meanwhile Jenny is visited by an ex, who has a surprise of his own for her.
11	11	"Call of the Wild"	Ron Way	Unknown	March 16, 1969
Jenny's parents invite Doubleday and Tobe to stay at their country home for a weekend of duck hunting.
12	12	"A Side Car Named Desire"	Ron Way	Unknown	May 25, 1969
When Doubleday buys a motorbike and sidecar, he invites Tobe and new teacher Phylis for a trip to the country. After the bike ends up in a creek, they spend the night in a haunted house.
13	13	"High Pressure"	Ron Way	Unknown	May 4, 1969
When Doubleday and Tobe undertake another job selling books door to door, they discover Principal Bates is one of the residents.
14	14	"Never Say Goodbye"	Ron Way	Unknown	June 15, 1969
Due to a miscommunication, Miss McTaggart resigns, and chaos ensues when the students go on strike.
15	15	"Once in a Lifetime"	Ron Way	Unknown	April 26, 1969
When Tobe second guesses proposing to Sandra, Doubleday convinces him to actually pop the question.
16	16	"Tobes' Apartment"	Ron Way	Unknown	May 18, 1969
Tobe rents an apartment without viewing it first, and Doubleday has to turn a nightmare into a dream.
17	17	"It Fits Where it Touches"	Ron Way	Unknown	June 1, 1969
When the area superintendent makes his first trip to the school, Doubleday tries to persuade him that the school requires a new building.
18	18	"Party Piece"	Ron Way	Unknown	May 24, 1969
Doubleday and Tobe are set to perform a minstrel act at the Annual Teachers Dinner. When the wrong costumes arrive, Phylis comes to the rescue with a family heirloom.
19	19	"Peek-a-Boo"	Ron Way	Unknown	June 24, 1969
An argument threatens to derail Tobe and Sandra's wedding. Doubleday and Mr. Hamilton agree to babysit for Miss McTaggart's nephew.
20	20	"Espanoza's Never Wrong"	Ron Way	Unknown	June 14, 1969
Astrology predict a bad day for Doubleday. When a TV producer visits the school with the possibility of filming a documentary, things go awry.
21	21	"It's an Ill Wind"	Ron Way	Unknown	July 22, 1969
A blizzard suddenly hits Kannabri. Miss McTaggart and Tobe make a surprise debut on TV.
22	22	"Vive La Discipline"	Ron Way	Unknown	July 15, 1969
Bates assigns Doubleday to welcome the new French teacher, who attracts the attention of all the male staff. Unimpressed, Jenny and Miss McTaggart take matters into their own hands.
23	23	"Quick, Quick, Slow"	Unknown	Unknown	July 29, 1969
Doubleday and Tobe try to teach Miss McTaggart to dance when they attend the school dance.
24	24	"The Best Laid Plans"	Robert Weekes	Unknown	August 12, 1969
Tobe designs a home as a surprise for his fiancé. Doubleday and Miss McTaggart come to the rescue when he forgets to include any windows or doors.
25	25	"Who'll Pay the Piper"	Robert Weekes	Unknown	August 26, 1969
A week before his wedding, Tobe receives a car repair bill, which may have to see him forfeit his honeymoon.
26	26	"Something Old Something New"	Robert Weekes	Unknown	August 2, 1969
Doubleday discovers getting married it's very complicated, when he is best man at Toby's wedding. After the wedding, Doubleday proposes to Jenny.

== Production ==
The series was shot entirely on video, using the newly-developed ‘Back-Pack’ portable camera.

Exterior shots were filmed on location in the town of Kyneton in Victoria, while interior scenes were shot at the ATV-0 (later, Network 10) studios in Melbourne. Scenes from episode 12 were filmed at Hanging Rock.

== Release ==
The series began airing during primetime weekend slots, but due to low ratings, it was eventually moved to weeknights after 9pm.

== Reception ==
Ron McLean, who wrote several scripts, called the series "appalling."
