= Double Yolk =

- Written by: Hugh Williams; Margaret Williams
- Directed by: Patrick Barton
- Country of origin: Australia
- Original language: English

Production
- Running time: 60 mins
- Production company: ABC

Original release
- Release: 15 May 1963 (Melbourne)
- Release: 26 June 1963 (Sydney)

Double Yolk is a 1963 Australian television play. It adapts two short plays, "By Accident" and "With Intent". Both were by Hugh and Margaret Williams, who had written The Grass is Greener.

== By Accident ==
"By Accident" is set in Northampton. It is about an air force pilot Bill about to be promoted to squadron leader whose wife Jane worries he will be killed in action, as her father was.

=== Cast ===
- Elspeth Ballantyne as Jane
- Fred Parslow as Bill
- Dorothy Bradley as Ann Brylerly
- Leslie Wright as Jim Bailey

== With Intent ==
"With Intent" is set in a house between Liverpool and Southport. It is about an invalid woman, Helen, who has a nurse, Miss Bennett (Joan Letch). The woman receives a letter from her husband Colin which was intended for another woman.

=== Cast ===
- Keith Eden as Colin
- Betty Berrell as Helen
- Joan Letch as Miss Bennett
- Edward Howell as doctor
