= The One Day of the Year =

1958 play by Alan Seymour

- Original language: English
- Written by: Alan Seymour

Premiere
- Date: 20 July 1960
- Place: Adelaide

The One Day of the Year is a 1958 Australian play by Alan Seymour about contested attitudes to Anzac Day.

== Origins ==
The play was inspired by an article in the University of Sydney newspaper Honi Soit criticising Anzac Day and Seymour's own observations of how ex-servicemen behaved on that day. The character of Alf was based on Seymour's brother in law.

== Plot ==
Alf’s son Hughie and his girlfriend Jan plan to document Anzac Day for the university newspaper, focusing on the drinking on Anzac Day. For the first time in his life Hughie refuses to attend the dawn service with Alf. When he watches the march on television at home with his mother and Wacka, he is torn between outrage at the display and love for his father.

== Characters ==
Alf Cook, Dot Cook, Hughie Cook, Wacka Dawson and Jan Castle.

== Productions ==
The play was rejected by the Adelaide Festival of Arts Board of Governors in 1960, but made its debut on 20 July 1960 as an amateur production by the Adelaide Theatre Group. Jean Marshall, the Director, and those involved in the Adelaide production received death threats. The first professional season was in April 1961 at the Palace Theatre in Sydney. It proved controversial and Seymour also received death threats however it was popular and there have been productions ever since. In 1961 Seymour travelled to London where the play was directed by Raymond Menmuir at the Theatre Royal Stratford East.

The play was published by Theatregoer magazine at a time when publishing Australian plays was rare.

=== Television productions ===
There were two productions of The One Day of the Year filmed for television in 1962; an Australian and a British production.

== 1962 Australian television version ==
The play was adapted for Australian TV in 1962 by John Sumner.

=== Cast ===
- Syd Conabere as Alf Cook
- Stewart Weller as Wacka
- Bunney Brooke as Dot Cook
- Dennis Miller as Hughie Cook
- Elaine Cusick as Jan Castle

== 1962 British television version ==
The play was adapted for British TV in 1962 and produced by James Ormerod.

=== Cast ===
- Kenneth Warren as Alf Cook
- Reg Lye as Wacka
- Madge Ryan as Dot Cook
- George Roubicek as Hughie Cook
- Georgina Ward as Jan Castle

== Film adaptation ==
Film rights were bought by Lou Edelmen Productions in 1970 but no film resulted.
