= Patsy King =

Australian actress (1930–2026)

- Born: Patricia Janet King; 16 September 1930; Melbourne, Victoria, Australia
- Died: 19 January 2026 (aged 95); Melbourne, Victoria, Australia
- Occupations: Actress (stage, radio, television, film); television presenter; director; commercial voiceover
- Years active: Theatre: 1951-1990; TV and film, voiceover: 1961-1990.
- Known for: Prisoner
- Notable work: Homicide; Bellbird; Play School; The Magic Circle Club; Adventure Island
- Spouse: John Sumner (m. 1959; div. 1967)

Patricia Janet King (16 September 1930 – 19 January 2026) was an Australian actress and children's television presenter recognised for her contributions to theatre, radio and television. Internationally, she was best known for portraying the original governor, Erica Davidson, in the cult television series Prisoner (known as Prisoner: Cell Block H in the UK and US and Caged Women in Canada).

King worked in children's programs Play School, and The Magic Circle Club, Adventure Island and was instrumental in establishing a theatre for children and as a writer and director with the Melbourne Writers Guild.

She worked in radio appearing in productions including Blue Hills and Dr. Paul.

King had also worked as a theatre director, playwright, and commercial voiceover artist. She began her career as a classical stage actress, performing in a range of roles including Shakespeare and Peter Pan. King's career spanned from 1951 to 1995, with a brief return to the stage in 2009. Her television career included roles in the series Homicide and Bellbird where she played Kate Andrews.

== Early life ==
King was born in Melbourne, Victoria, on 16 September 1930, to Bill and Lillian Billy King and attended Camberwell Girls Grammar School. Initially aspiring to become a dress designer, she embarked on an acting career at a time when theatre and radio offered a variety of roles, but television was yet to begin transmission in Australia. She trained as a classical stage actress with the National Theatre in Melbourne, specialising in straight drama and Shakespeare and made her professional stage debut in 1951. In 1953 she travelled with two friends to the United Kingdom in time for the coronation of Queen Elizabeth II, before returning to Australia the following year.

== Career ==
=== Theatre ===
King began her career as a stage actress in the early 1950s and later became a playwright and director. She performed in a variety of roles, including productions of Victoria Regina, The Miser, Summer of the Seventeenth Doll, Richard II, Blithe Spirit, Absurd Person Singular, Half a Sixpence, A Lovely Sunday for Creve Coeur, Love for Love and Love Letters. Her performances earned her several awards, including the Erik Award and the Melbourne Critics Award for her role in The Fourposter.

=== Television ===
In the early 1960s, King began her television career with teleplays on the ABC, followed by a variety of serials and guest roles in several Crawford Productions series, including Hunter, The Sullivans and The Box. She also appeared in police procedural dramas such as Matlock Police, Division 4, Bluey, Cop Shop and Homicide. Her other television credits include Power Without Glory, Chopper Squad, Out of Love and Good Morning Mr Doubleday.

King became a regular cast member on the series Bellbird as Kate Andrews and as Governor Erica Davidson in Prisoner (also known as Prisoner: Cell Block H outside of Australia). In Prisoner she portrayed the first on-screen governor of the fictional Wentworth Detention Centre, appearing in 351 episodes. Following the conclusion of the series, King toured the United Kingdom in a stage play based on the program.

King was also a notable children's television presenter, being an early host of Play School on the ABC. She additionally appeared in The Magic Circle Club and Adventure Island.

== Personal life and death ==
In 1959, King married the English-born Australian theatre impresario John Sumner, the founder and artistic director of the Melbourne Theatre Company. They divorced in 1967. King died in Melbourne on 19 January 2026 at the age of 95.

== Filmography ==
=== Film ===
Year	Title	Role	Type
1972	The Journey		Film short

=== Television ===
Year	Title	Role	Type
1961	The Rivals	Lydia	Teleplay
1962	Suspect (episode of The General Motors Hour)	Janet	Teleplay
1964	Wind from the Icy Country	Ella	Teleplay
1965–1975	Homicide	Sarah Adams / Helen Taylor / Trin Turner / Shirley Wallace / Kay Loder / Policewoman Burke / Janet Smith / Pat Palmer / Sybil Cochrane / Mary Hamilton / Joan Preston / Carol Long / Betty Nyberg / Joy	TV series, 14 episodes
1965	A Time to Speak (episode of Wednesday Theatre)	Annie	Teleplay
1965	Photo Finish (episode of Wednesday Theatre)		Teleplay
1966	The Decision (episode of Australian Playhouse)	Sally Peters	TV series
1966	Play School	Presenter	TV series, 10 episodes
1967	Bellbird	Kate Andrews	TV series, recurring role
1967	Adventure Island	Miss Behaviour	TV series, regular role
1968	Hunter	Jean Gallagher	TV series, 1 episode
1969	Good Morning, Mr. Doubleday	Bridget O'Connor	TV series, 1 episode
1969	Dynasty	Kathy Mason	TV series, 1 episode
1970–1975	Division 4	Mrs. Carr / Susan Hill / Carol Foster / Marion Dalton / Valerie Fisher	TV series, 5 episodes
1970	The Long Arm	Naomi	TV series, 1 episode
1971–1974	Matlock Police	Lily / Joan / Jan Ross	TV series, 3 episodes
1974	Marion	Mrs. Finnegan	TV miniseries, 3 episodes
1974	This Love Affair		TV series, episode 2: "Tilting at Windmills"
1974	The Box	Gloria	TV series, 2 episodes
1974	Out of Love		TV series, episode 2: "It Will Never Work"
1976	Power Without Glory	Vera Maguire	TV miniseries, 4 episodes
1977	Bluey	Tina Golding	TV series, episode 33: "Final Devotion"
1977	Hotel Story		TV series, 1 episode
1977	The Sullivans	Beryl Fletcher	TV series, 4 episodes
1978	Cop Shop	Sara Fitzsimmons / Julie Gibbons	TV series, 2 episodes
1978	Chopper Squad	Iris Deacon	TV series, episode 5: "8:52 A.M."
1979	The Franky Doyle Story	Erica Davidson	TV film
1981	Prisoner in Concert	Erica Davidson	TV special
1979–1984	Prisoner	Regular role: Governor Erica Davidson / Erica	TV series, 353 episodes

== Theatre ==
=== As actor ===
Year	Title	Role	Venue / Co.
1951	Victoria Regina		National Theatre, Melbourne
1952	National Theatre Festival of the Arts 1952: Season Six		Princess Theatre, Melbourne
1955	The Lady from the Sea		National Theatre, Melbourne
1956	Summer and Smoke	Nellie Ewell	Union Theatre Repertory Company
1956	The Miser		National Theatre, Melbourne
1957	The Wind of Heaven		Union Theatre Repertory Company
1957	Our Town	Rebecca Webb	Union Theatre Repertory Company
1957	The Queen and the Rebels	Peasant	Union Theatre Repertory Company
1957	The Matchmaker	Ermengarde	Union Theatre Repertory Company
1957	Tonight in Samarkand		Union Theatre Repertory Company
1957	Ring Round the Moon	Diana Messerschmann	Union Theatre Repertory Company
1957	Cat on a Hot Tin Roof	Margaret Wolfie Dixie	Union Theatre Repertory Company
1957	A View from the Bridge	Neighbour	Union Theatre Repertory Company
1957	Peter Pan (pantomime)		Princess Theatre, Melbourne
1957–60	Summer of the Seventeenth Doll	Bubba Ryan	Darwin Town Hall, Australian regional tour, His Majesty's Theatre, Auckland, Opera House, Wellington, Theatre Royal, Adelaide
1960	See How They Run	Penelope Toop	Union Theatre Repertory Company
1961	The Mystery of a Hansom Cab	Madge Frettleby	Russell Street Theatre, Union Theatre Repertory Company
1961	The Importance of Being Ernest	Cecily Cardew	Union Theatre Repertory Company
1961	Romanoff and Juliet	Juliet Moulsworth	Union Theatre Repertory Company
1962	Dracula	Lucy Seward	Union Theatre Repertory Company
1963	The Good Ship Walter Raleigh	Josephine	Union Theatre Repertory Company
1963	Richard II		Union Theatre Repertory Company
1963–65	The Fourposter	Agnes	Russell Street Theatre
1963	The Happy Invalid		Union Theatre Repertory Company
1965	The Glazed Look		St Martins Theatre, Melbourne
1966	The Cavern		St Martins Theatre, Melbourne
1967	Half A Sixpence	Helen Walsingham	Comedy Theatre, Melbourne
1968	See How They Run /Charley's Aunt		St Martins Theatre, Melbourne
1969	Marching Song		St Martins Theatre, Melbourne
1969	Love for Love	Angelica	St Martins Theatre, Melbourne
1969–1970	Blithe Spirit	Elvira	St Martins Theatre, Melbourne
1974	The Slaughter of St Theresa's Day		Monash University
1976	Absurd Person Singular	Margaret	Theatre Royal, Hobart
1978	Innocent Bystanders	Lilith	Playbox Theatre, Melbourne
1983	A Lovely Sunday for Creve Coeur	Helena	Playbox Theatre, Melbourne
1984	Farewell Brisbane Ladies		Universal Theatre, Melbourne
1989	Prisoner the Stage Play	Erica Davidson	UK
2009	Love Letters (charity performance)	Melissa Gardner	Chapter House at St Paul's Cathedral, Melbourne

=== As director ===
Year	Title	Role	Venue / Co.
1989	Love with the Lights Out	Director	Carlton Courthouse with Melbourne Writers' Theatre
1990	A Constant Lover	Director	Carlton Courthouse, Melbourne with Melbourne Writers' Theatre
1990	An Office Romance	Director	Carlton Courthouse, Melbourne with Melbourne Writers' Theatre
