= Winter Passion =

1960 Australian radio play

Winter Passion is a 1960 Australian radio play by Alan Seymour about the relationship between Chopin and George Sand on the island of Majorca. It was written to celebrate the Chopin sesquicentenary.

According to Leslie Rees, the play:

Had real success within its A.B.C. field. It contained brilliantly eruptive as well as passionately tender dialogue, trending to an intransigent condition of cynicism and bitterness at the end. Seymour wrote it on commission from the A.B.C. Direct commissions only rarely produce internally creative results. This one did and it was revived several times.

Arlene Sykes called it "among the best Australian radio plays ever broadcast. Written in a style not characteristic of Seymour, it traces from beginning to end the relationship between Chopin and George Sand, making a powerful and compassionate radio play, with little comedy and nothing of the grotesque."

The play debuted on 22 February 1960. It was performed on Canadian radio in 1961 and performed again in Australia in 1962.

The Bulletin called it "a tour de force which for its control of dialogue, situation, character and period style still has the excited admiration of the A.B.C. officers who commissioned and broadcast it."
