= Elly & Jools =

Australian children's television series

- Genre: Children's television series
- Created by: Posie Graeme-Evans
- Written by: Greg Haddrick; Maureen Ann Moran; Chris Roache; Alister Webb
- Directed by: Karl Zwicky
- Starring: Rebecca Smart; Clayton Williamson; Peter Fisher; Anne Tenney; Abigail; Dennis Miller; Damon Herriman; Vanessa Collier
- Theme music composer: Chris Harriott; Dennis Watkins
- Opening theme: "Help Me Through The World" by Andrew Cam and Nadine Weinberger
- Ending theme: "Help Me Through The World" (instrumental)
- Composer: Chris Harriott
- No. of series: 1
- No. of episodes: 12

Production
- Executive producer: Errol Sullivan
- Producers: Posie Graeme-Evans; Errol Sullivan
- Editor: John Cameron
- Running time: 25 minutes
- Production company: Southern Star Group

Original release
- Network: Nine Network
- Release: 11 June – 26 June 1990

Elly & Jools is an Australian children's television series that originally aired on the Nine Network in 1990.

It starred Rebecca Smart as Elinor "Elly" Lockett and Clayton Williamson as Julian "Jools" Trevaller. It also featured Abigail, Anne Tenney, Peter Fisher, Dennis Miller, Damon Herriman and Vanessa Collier.

== Cast ==
- Rebecca Smart as Elinor "Elly" Lockett
- Clayton Williamson as Julian "Jools" Trevaller
- Abigail as Dulcie Dickson
- Anne Tenney as Anna Trevaller
- Peter Fisher as David Trevaller
- Dennis Miller as Feral O'Farrell
- Damon Herriman as Liam O'Farrell
- Vanessa Collier as Bridget O'Farrell
- Albert Moran
- Willie Fennell as Cec
- Bob Baines as Sergeant Digges

== Plot synopsis ==
The Trevaller family move from the city to a new house in a small country town called Waterloo Creek. The house they move into is haunted by the ghost of a young girl named Elinor "Elly" Lockett who died in the 19th century. Elly befriends the Julian "Jools" Trevaller, who tries to help solve the mystery of her death.

In the final episode it is revealed that Elly died in a tragic accident and stayed in the world of the living in order to clear the name of the man suspected of her murder. Having achieved peace, she passes to the afterlife and is reunited with her loving family whilst Jools meets Eloise, a living girl identical to Elly who is perceived either as her reincarnation or as a sign to him that the world is full of human girls just like her.

== Production ==
Filming of Elly and Jools commenced in July 1989. Rebecca Smart's casting announced shortly after the commencement of filming.

The show was filmed at Peninsula House in Windsor, New South Wales and at the Australiana Pioneer Village in Wilberforce.

The dog which appeared in the series also played the dingo in the Meryl Streep and Sam Neill film, A Cry in the Dark.

== Home media ==
In 1991, the twelve 30-minute episodes were condensed into one three-hour video distributed by CIC Video.

== Reception ==
Elly and Jools received positive reviews from television critics.

The Sydney Morning Herald's Jon Casimir praised the show describing it as a "pleasure to watch" due to Karl Zwicky's inventive direction, an up-tempo soundtrack from Chris Harriott, the "sterling work" of the actors and also because of "an all-pervasive sense of fun" and "an unabashed enthusiasm." Casimir also wrote: "...what Elly and Jools has to say about life is every bit as pertinent if not more so, than anything you could learn from Ramsay Street or Summer Bay."

While discussing Australian children's television which had been produced during the year of 1990, Margaret Geddes from The Age described Elly and Jools as "another gem made locally" and a "delightfully gentle romantic comedy."

== See also ==
- List of ghost films
