= John Dease =

Australian radio personality (1906–1979)

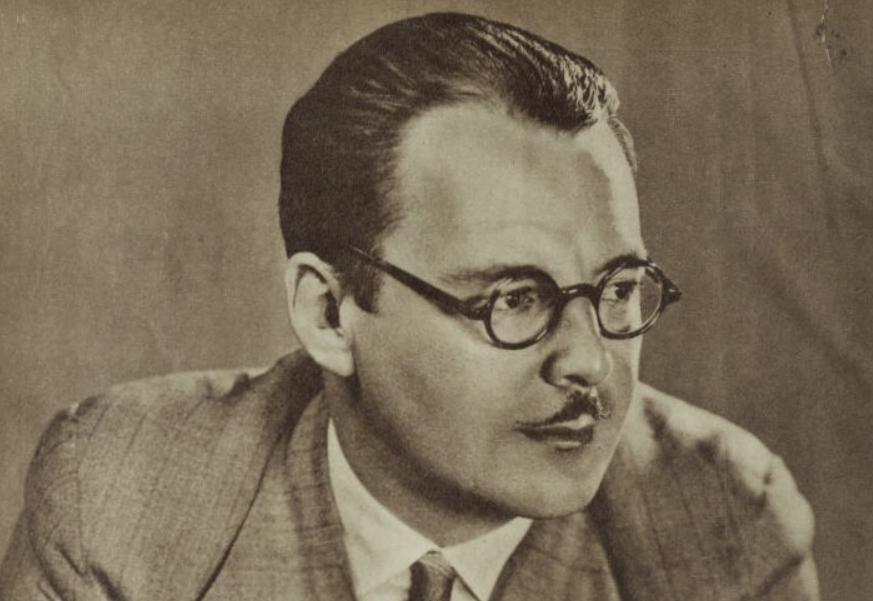
- John Dease c.1937
- Born: Conly John Paget Dease; 26 May 1906; Bhamo, Burma, British India
- Died: 1 February 1979 (aged 72); Ashfield, Sydney, New South Wales
- Spouse(s): Margaret Mary Mildre 'Greta' Lofberg (1938–1944), Rankura 'Kura' Margery De Villiers Walmsley née East (1948–1991) (his death)
- Presenting career
- Show: World Famous Tenors
- Station: 2GB/3AW
- Network: Macquarie Radio Network
- Show: The Quiz Kids
- Station: 2GB/3AW
- Network: Macquarie
- Time slot: Sunday evening
- Country: Australia

Conly John Paget Dease (26 May 1906 – 1 February 1979) was an Australian radio presenter and quiz show host at 2GB, Sydney, and through it, the Macquarie Radio Network from 1935 until at least 1969.

He was born in Bhamo, Upper Burma, son of a lieutenant in the 91st Punjabi Regiment. He completed his schooling after the family's return to Somerset. Rather than follow his father into the army, he migrated in 1923 to South Australia as one of the Barwell Boys. He was first indentured as a farm labourer to E. H. Mattner of Clare, South Australia but failed to impress however, and likewise failed in a 1925 apprenticeship to printer Hunter Brothers of Leabrook. In 1928 he began teaching at Scotch College, Adelaide followed by a stint at Tudor House, Moss Vale, New South Wales then from 1930 to 1933 at Scots College, Sydney.

He was meanwhile building his stage skills with Doris Fitton's Independent Theatre, featuring in productions such as Musical Chairs and Ship of Heaven until 1933, when he started working professionally for J. C. Williamson's in musical comedies.

== Radio career ==
In 1935, he signed up as an announcer with radio 2GB, headquarters of the Macquarie Radio Network, eventually becoming its chief announcer. He has been named as one of the 'Five D's of Australian Radio' with Jack Davey, Bob Dyer, Terry Dear and Harry Dearth. His longest-running program was World Famous Tenors. Other programs include Nature Speaks (sponsored by Edward Hallstrom) 1947 to 1954. As a volunteer he recorded approximately two hundred Talking Books for the Blind.

== The Quiz Kids ==
In 1942 he began the program for which he is now best remembered, The Quiz Kids. Modelled on a US program of the same name (one of whose panel members was the young James D. Watson), its format involved a panel of five Sydney schoolboys and girls aged 11 to 15, who were challenged by questions sent in by listeners from all around Australia. The listener was rewarded with cash and sponsors' products in the event of no 'Quiz Kid' supplying a satisfactory answer. A separate panel in Melbourne was used for six weeks each year. Dease played the avuncular quizmaster. In all publicity photographs and public appearances he wore an academic gown and mortarboard, as were the panel members, many of whom, such as NSW premier Neville Wran, senior academics John Lambert, Jack Goldring and James Seymour Hagan, were to achieve eminence as adults. Barry Jones, who later went on to become a Labor politician, was a member of the Melbourne panel in 1947 and 1948. Others included Sue Pearson (mother of Christopher Pearson), David Low, Nola Manning, Michael Connors, Leon Smith, Yvonne Cossart, Milton Osborne, Alana Conlan, Tom Kalmar, Annette Cumine. The first team in 1942 consisted of James Hagan, Bernard Lake, Alan Mitchell, Audrey Baker and Dorothy Revie. The program was broadcast on 2GB Sunday 7:30pm; Tuesday 8pm from 1943; Sunday 7:30pm from 1959 and was terminated on 14 October 1962. Sponsors were Colgate-Palmolive 1942–1944; Johnson & Johnson 1944–1958(?).

Episodes 203 to 1025 of The Quiz Kids radio program are preserved in the National Film and Sound Archive. A photographic portrait of Dease, by Max Dupain, from 1941 around the time that the series began, is in the collection of the National Portrait Gallery.

The program was revived for television on ABC Television from 1964 to 1968 after an abortive simulcast attempt in 1957.

== Acting career ==
Dease was an active supporter of live theatre, helping Peter Finch establish the Mercury Theatre in 1946.

Apart from parts in episodes of various TV series (Chopper Squad, Case for the Defence, Certain Women), he played Sir Hubert Wilkins in the 1946 movie Smithy, 'Whitty' in the 1970 movie Ned Kelly and newsreader 'Ken' in the successful 1978 movie Newsfront. He was also in demand as commentator on newsreels and travelogues such as The Dance of the Eyes.

== Personal life ==
Dease was elected vice-president of Actors Equity but forced to resign in 1948 after being labelled a Communist. Always of left-wing political persuasion, he was associated with the Aid Russia Committee Paper and presented a paper at the Congress of Friendship and Aid to the Soviet Union in Sydney Town Hall, 30 August 1941. In 1972 he appeared in a Labor Party advertisement under the slogan It's Time although he was an Australia Party candidate for the federal seat of Evans. He joined the Labor Party in 1974.

Dease married Margaret Mary Mildred 'Greta' Lofberg in December 1938. She commenced divorce proceedings in 1944. He married again in 1948, to Rankura 'Kura' Margery De Villiers Walmsley née East. They were still married when he died in 1979. He was survived by children John, Sarah, and Geoffrey.
