= This Is Television =

- The General Motors Hour episode
- Sydney Morning Herald 25 Jul 1960
- Episode no.: Season 1 Episode 2
- Directed by: Rod Kinnear
- Written by: Graham Freudenberg
- Presented by: Harry Dearth
- Original air date: June 25, 1960
- Running time: 60 mins

Guest appearance
- Eric Pearce

Episode chronology
| ← Previous "The Grey Nurse Said Nothing" | Next → "Thunder on Sycamore Street" |

"This Is Television" is a 1960 Australian television documentary which appeared as an episode of The General Motors Hour. It included behind the scenes look at the following:

- a brief overview of how television works with Eric Pearce
- preparation of a variety show
- look at the production of The Grey Nurse Said Nothing
- preparation of In Melbourne Tonight
- the role of critics, including a discussion involving Frank Thring and newspaper critic John Moses
- appearances by Galatea and the Horrie Dargie Quintet

Advertisements for General Motors Holden appear throughout.

The documentary is hosted by radio and television presenter Harry Dearth and narrated by Melbourne newsreader Eric Pearce.

== Reception ==
The Australian Woman's Weekly said it had "a tight script, well delivered, and gave a clear and interesting picture of what goes on."

Filmink wrote "As entertainment, it’s a mixed bag; as a historical document, it’s fascinating and invaluable."
