= Alan Seymour =

Australian playwright

Alan Seymour OAM
- Born: 6 June 1927; Fremantle, Western Australia
- Died: 23 March 2015 (aged 87); Sydney, New South Wales, Australia
- Partner: Ron Baddeley (1949–2003)
- Writing career
- Notable work: The One Day of the Year

Alan Seymour OAM (6 June 1927 – 23 March 2015) was an Australian playwright and author. He is best known for the play The One Day of the Year (1958). His international reputation rests not only on this early play, but also on his many screenplays, television scripts and adaptations of novels for film and television.

== Career ==
Seymour was born in Fremantle, Western Australia. His father was killed in a wharf accident when Alan was nine, and his mother, a Cockney from London, died a few months later. After that he was brought up by his sister May and her husband, Alfred Chester Cruthers. He was educated at Perth Modern School, leaving at 15 after failing to complete the Junior Certificate.

He found work as a radio announcer in a commercial radio station 6PM. During his two years there he wrote a number of short radio plays that were broadcast live. In 1945, he moved to Sydney, New South Wales, where he worked as an advertising copy-writer with radio station 2UE.

Seymour returned to Perth after the war where he worked as a free-lance writer for ABC Radio. He became ABC Radio's film critic. He joined a commercial radio station 6KY as an announcer and copy-writer and after six months was offered an announcing post at the ABC. In 1949, he met Ron Baddeley, an RAAF veteran, and the two would become life partners.

In November 1949, Seymour moved again to Sydney where he became an educational and freelance drama writer for ABC Radio and later television. From 1953 to 1957 he was theatrical director for the Sydney Opera Group. His first play, Swamp Creatures, premièred by the Canberra Repertory Society, was a finalist in the London Observer play competition in 1957.

Seymour left Australia in 1961 and worked in London as a television writer, producer and commissioning editor with the BBC, and as a theatre critic for The London Magazine. In 1965, his play Stockbrokers are Smashing But Bankers Are Better was withdrawn from broadcast on ITV, due to concerns over its sexual content.

From 1966 to 1971 he lived in İzmir, Turkey, where Ron Baddeley had gained employment as an English teacher. There Seymour wrote a novelisation of The One Day of the Year, and another novel The Coming Self-Destruction of the United States of America, as well as stage plays and magazine articles. From 1974 to 1981, he was a script editor and occasional producer with BBC Television, after which he returned to freelance writing. He won a BAFTA Award for his 1984 adaptation of John Masefield's novel The Box of Delights.

Seymour and Baddeley returned to Australia in 1995 and lived in Darlinghurst, Sydney. In 2003, after a partnership of almost 55 years, Ron Baddeley died at age 80. Seymour was awarded the Medal of the Order of Australia in 2007, and died in an aged care facility in Elizabeth Bay in 2015, aged 87.

== The One Day of the Year ==
His best-known play, The One Day of the Year, was written in 1958 for an amateur playwriting competition, inspired by an article in the University of Sydney newspaper Honi Soit lambasting Anzac Day.

The play met with huge controversy on its release. Initially it was rejected by the Adelaide Festival of Arts Board of Governors in 1960, but was first performed on 20 July 1960 as an amateur production by the Adelaide Theatre Group. In April 1961, at the first professional season at the Palace Theatre in Sydney, a bomb scare during a dress rehearsal forced police to clear the theatre. Later that year the production was staged at the Theatre Royal Stratford East, in London. Since then it has been staged regularly throughout Australia and internationally and a television adaptations were produced in Australia and Britain in 1962. It is also studied in various school curricula.

== Select writings ==
- Tomorrow's Child (1957) – TV play
- The Lark (1959) – TV play
- One Bright Day (1959) – TV play
- The Life and Death of King Richard II (1960) – TV play
- Lean Liberty (1961)
- Donny Johnson (1961)
- The Runner (1962) – TV play
- Auto Stop (1965) - TV play
- The Trial and Torture of Sir John Rampayne (1965) - TV play
- Winter Passion (1962) - radio play
- The Christopher Marlowe Murder Mystery
- And It Wasn't Just the Feathers
- Stockbrokers Are Smashing: But Bankers Are Better
- Break in the Music (1966) - stage play
- The Glass Virgin (1995) – television screenplay
