= The Ballad of Angel's Alley =

Australian musical

The Ballad of Angel's Alley: A Pocket Opera
- Original language: English
- Written by: Jeff Underhill
- Music by: Bruce George
- Lyrics by: Jeff Underhill
- Genre: musical

Premiere
- Date: December 1958
- Place: New Theatre, Melbourne

The Ballad of Angel's Alley: A Pocket Opera is an Australian musical set in Melbourne's "push" wars of the 1890s, with book and lyrics by Jeff Underhill and music by Bruce George.

== Production history ==
=== 1958 production ===
The Age 22 Jan 1959

It was first seen at Melbourne's New Theatre in 1958, because no commercial management would take it on. "Most managements in this country can’t even read a score", said Underhill at the time. "They have to go to New York or London to find a musical that they can put on here".

=== 1962 Union Theatre production ===
The Ballad of Angel's Alley received a professional premiere in July 1962 at the Russell St Theatre in Melbourne presented by the Union Theatre Repertory Company, featuring Kevin Colson, Mary Hardy, Reg Livermore, Marion Edward and Bob Hornery. It was part of a season of Australian works at the Union Theatre, the others being revivals of The Shifting Heart, The One Day of the Year and Summer of the Seventeenth Doll.

Reviewing the 1962 Melbourne production, The Bulletin said it was "a loud, fast and funny musical" and "a brilliant success - at least as good as the average imported musical, and the best thing of local origin we have seen for years". The script was published by Yackandandah Playscripts in 1989.

=== Other productions ===
It was also performed by NIDA students at Sydney's Old Tote Theatre in September 1963. This production relocated the action to the Sydney Rocks. The Sydney morning Herald called it "unequivocal entertainment."

The play was presented by the New Theatre in Sydney in 1965. The Viaduct Theatre in Melbourne produced it in 1967.

It was revived professionally by Melbourne's St Martin's Theatre in April 1973.

== Premise ==
The rivalry between two street gangs, one led by Tiddler and the other by Bill Fiddler. Tiddler dies from influenza rather than in battle, but his daughter Maria takes over the gang.
