= Blithe Spirit =

Blithe Spirit may refer to:

- Blithe Spirit (play), a 1941 comic play written by Noël Coward
- Blithe Spirit (1945 film), a British comedy film based on the play
- Blithe Spirit (Ford Star Jubilee), a 1956 television play version of the play
- Blithe Spirit (2020 film), a British-American comedy film based on the play

== See also ==
- To a Skylark, poem ("Hail to Thee, blithe spirit ...) of Romantic Era, by P. B. Shelley
- Blythe Spirit, 1981 jazz album by Arthur Blythe
