= Harry Dearth =

Australian radio producer

- Born: Henry Alan Dearth; 12 August 1908; Fulham, London
- Died: 7 July 1964 (aged 55); Cammeray, Sydney
- Education: Cranleigh School, Surrey (1917–1923)
- Occupations: Actor, producer
- Spouse: Mona Potts (m. 15 June 1935)
- Children: 2

Harry Dearth (12 August 1908 – 7 July 1964) was an Australian actor and producer best known for his career in radio. He was one of the leading radio producers in Australia in the 1940s and 1950s. He also worked in television and theatre.

== Early life ==
Dearth was born on 12 August 1908 in Fulham, London, to Henry Dearth and Edith Eliza Eleanor, née Bristow, who were renowned singers. He attended Cranleigh School, Surrey from 1917 to 1923, where he passed the Oxford and Cambridge examination.

Dearth claimed to have spent six months in the 20th Middlesex (Artists) Rifle Volunteers in London. Arriving in Sydney on 31 May 1926, he worked as jackaroo on stations at Garangula, Cunningar and Wingadee, Coonamble.

== Career ==
In 1929, Dearth started working in theatre, in Sydney. with J. C. Williamson's. Beginning in the chorus, he progressed to minor roles in musical comedies, including 1933 productions of Our Miss Gibbs and Gay Divorce. He left the cast of the latter production to take up a position as a radio announcer on 2FC.

Continuing in radio, Dearth began a position with the ABC. In 1934, he became an announcer on 2GB, presenting serials such as Melody and Mirth with Harry Dearth. During this time, he took singing lessons to learn correct breathing. He also played supporting roles with the BSA Players (Broadcasting Services Association), and took roles under Doris Fitton at Sydney's Independent Theatre. He later became a director of the John Alden Company.

In 1939, Dearth became a producer of the Australian version of Lux Radio Theatre, broadcast nationally. He also produced and hosted talent series Australia's Amateur Hour from 1940. He continued on both series until beginning service in the RAAF in 1942. His appointment ended in December 1945, after which time he returned to Lux Radio Theatre, where he remained until its conclusion in 1951.

From 1952 to 1954, Dearth became producer and compère of Leave It to the Girls and The General Motors Hour on 2GB, before moving to 2UW to present Harry Dearth's Playhouse.

On television, Hearth produced simulcasts for 2GB/ATN-7, before becoming production manager at ATN in 1960. He also produced and had an acting role in the television series Jonah in 1962.

== Personal life ==
After having appeared on stage with actress Mona Potts in a J. C. Williamson's production of Gay Divorce in 1933, Dearth married Potts on 15 June 1935 at St Philip's Anglican Church, in Sydney.

In 1963, while was overseas studying television techniques, Dearth's respiratory health declined. He died of cancer on 7 July 1964 at home in Cammeray, Sydney, and was survived by his wife, daughter, Harriet and son, Henry.

== Select credits ==
=== Radio ===
Year	Title	Role	Notes	Ref.
1934	Melody and Mirth with Harry Dearth	Presenter	Serial	
1939–1942; 1945–1951	Lux Radio Theatre	Producer	Serial	
1940–1942	Australia's Amateur Hour	Producer	Serial	
1952–1954	Leave It to the Girls	Producer / Compère	Serial	
1952–1954	The General Motors Hour	Producer / Compère	Serial	
	Harry Dearth's Playhouse	Presenter	Serial	

=== Theatre ===
Year	Title	Role	Notes	Ref.
1933	Our Miss Gibbs	Actor	J. C. Williamson's	
1934	The Girl Friend	Porter	King's Theatre, Melbourne with J. C. Williamson's	
1934	Gay Divorce	Porter	Theatre Royal, Adelaide, Theatre Royal Sydney with J. C. Williamson's	
1934	Blue Mountain Melody	Reggie	Theatre Royal Sydney with J. C. Williamson's	
1942	Thumbs Up	Performer	Her Majesty's Theatre, Brisbane with J. C. Williamson's	
1950	The Merchant of Venice	Bassanio	St James' Hall, Sydney with John Alden Company	
1951–1952	King Lear	Director	Theatre Royal, Adelaide, Albert Hall, Canberra with John Alden Company	
1951–1952	John Alden Company National Tour	Director	Australian tour	
1952	The Merchant of Venice	Director	Comedy Theatre, Melbourne, Theatre Royal, Adelaide with John Alden Company	
1952	The Merry Wives of Windsor	Director	Comedy Theatre, Melbourne, Theatre Royal, Adelaide, Albert Hall, Canberra with John Alden Company	
1952	A Midsummer Night's Dream	Director	Theatre Royal, Adelaide with John Alden Company	
1952	The Winter's Tale	Director	His Majesty's Theatre, Perth with John Alden Company	

=== Film and television ===
Year	Title	Role	Notes	Ref.
1937	A Nation Is Built	Narrator	TV documentary film	
1941	It's the Navy	Narrator	Short film	
1941	Road to Victory: Milestones in the Struggle for Liberty	Narrator	Documentary film	
1957	Pantomime Quiz	Host	2 episodes	
1958	What’s in the Picture	Host	Series	
1960	This is Television	Presenter	Documentary	
1960–1961	Whiplash	Casting consultant	25 episodes	
1961	Whiplash	Sir John Wickett	1 episode	
1962–1963	Jonah	Executive producer / actor	19 episodes	
