= Bettina Welch =

New Zealand-born Australia-based actress

- Welch as Maggie Cameron in Number 96
- Born: Betty Kathrine; 14 March 1921; Wellington, New Zealand
- Died: 5 March 1993 (aged 71); Sydney, New South Wales, Australia
- Other name: Betty Welch
- Occupations: Television actress; theatre performer; radio personality; singer
- Years active: 1934–1992

Bettina Catherine O'Brien (née Welch; 14 March 1921– 5 March 1993) was a New Zealand-born Australia-based actress, primarily in radio and theatre and of the latter in television roles. She was best known for her role in television soap opera Number 96 as Maggie Cameron, a scheming businesswoman and fashion editor.

The series creator and writer David Sale, stated she was the first major bitch on television, long before Alexis Carrington (Joan Collins) and he based her on arch-typical Hollywood bitches like Joan Crawford.

== Early life ==
Welch was born Wellington, New Zealand as Betty Kathrine Welch in March 1921. to Desmond Welch and Cathrine Jameson, her father worked variously as a clerk, civil servant and farmer, and was a soldier, who during WWI in 1916, served with the British as a member of the New Zealand Expeditionary Force, Bettina studied music in London, at the Preparatory Trinity College of Music.

== Acting career ==
Welch started her early career in radio whilst she was a teenager in 1934 in her native New Zealand, and continued her acting career in theatre and radio in 1940, having emigrating to Australia when she arrived in Sydney from New Zealand with her parents aboard the HMT Awatea on holiday.

In Sydney she won a competition that led to her joining JC Williamson's theatre company, and she also began acting on Australian radio. Her training with JC Williamson led to a succession of theatre roles with the company. She married Dermot Patrick O'Brien on 20 February 1945 at St Canice's Catholic Church, Rushcutters Bay.

Welch was best known for her long tenure in theatre, when British actor Robert Morley conducted an Australian theatre tour in 1949 she played his young mistress in his co-scripted play Edward, My Son.

Her other stage roles include Australian productions of Harvey with Joe E. Brown, Simon and Laura and The Deep Blue Sea with Googie Withers and John McCallum, the lead role opposite Emrys Jones in Double Image, and a featured role with Sir Robert Helpmann in Nude with Violin by Noël Coward.

Welch appeared as the enchantress Morgan le Fey in J. C. Williamson's production of Camelot in the early 1960s, a role she played for two and a half years. She subsequently took one of the lead roles in four-handed comedy Any Wednesday, appeared in productions of There's A Girl In My Soup, and The Band Wagon. The nurse in Loot, by Joe Orton featured in A Delicate Balance, playing Julia by Edward Albee and took the lead role in a production of Frederick Knott's Wait Until Dark, a role for which she was critically acclaimed.

Welch played in Melbourne and Sydney in Hal Porter's Australian play Eden House. She had a major role in the Sydney Theatre Company's season of the Stephen Sondheim musical, A Little Night Music" at the Sydney Opera House in 1990.

== Television roles ==
Welch started in TV roles from the early 1960s with guest parts in Australian television drama series, in the Crawford Productions adventure series Hunter (1967), and in the top-rated Crawford Productions police dramas Homicide and Division 4.

In 1971 Welch appeared in an episode of a situation comedy series called The Group, being cast after the show's writer David Sale, had earlier been impressed by the performance she gave in the Australian Broadcasting Corporation-Artransa Films science fiction children's series Phoenix 5 (1970), he promised to write a longer running part for her especially next time.

When Sale created soap opera Number 96 he kept his word, creating especially for her the role of corrupt businesswoman and fashion editor Maggie Cameron, featuring from the show's inception in March 1972, her character emerged as a popular bitch-figure in the top-rated serial. Welch says she partly based her characterisation of Maggie on the Mrs. Robinson character played by Anne Bancroft in film The Graduate. Welch left the series temporarily in 1973 to again act on stage opposite Robert Morley, this time in How the Other Half Loves. She returned to the Number 96 after that, and also reprised the role in the feature film version in 1974. By 1975 the TV series had suffered a drop in ratings so a bomb storyline was developed as a dramatic way to write out several key characters. The story went to air in September. Maggie was revealed to have been the person who planted the bomb and her character written out the series by being sent to prison. Welch returned for a guest appearance in 1976 when Maggie's trial was shown, and she appeared in the show's final episode in 1977 where it was explained that Maggie had been released from prison.

Post-Number 96 Welch continued guest roles in television series including Glenview High (1977), The Outsiders (1977), Young Ramsay (1978), and the legal drama Case for the Defence (1978). In the 1980s Welch acted in television movies and feature films, including Undercover (1983), and guest starred in two episodes of A Country Practice.

Welch died in Sydney, Australia in 1993, aged 71.

== Filmography ==
FILM

Title	Year	Role	Type
1974	Number 96	Maggie Cameron	Feature film
1983	Undercover	Dowager	Feature film
1986	Departure	Lady Bracknell	Feature film
1991	Gotcha	Grandmother	Film Short

Television

Title	Year	Role	Type
1961	Whiplash	Guest roles: Catha Cameron / Mary Dillon	TV series, 2 episodes
1962	Suspect	Guest role: Lady Const	Teleplay
1966	Homicide	Guest roles: Julie Temple / Maggie Glasson	TV series, 2 episodes
1968	Hunter	Guest role: Sheridan York	TV series, 1 episode
1969;1970	Division 4	Guest role: Edna Shaw	TV series, 1 episode
1970	Phoenix Five	Guest role: Karella	TV series, 1 episode
1970	Division 4	Guest role: Irene Kemp	TV series, 1 episode
1971	The Group	Guest role	TV series, 1 episode
1972-1976	Number 96	Regular role: Maggie Cameron	TV series, 166 episodes
1976	Number 96 ... And They Said It Wouldn't Last	Herself / Maggie Cameron	TV special
1977	Maggi Ekhardt Show	Herself - Guest	TV series, 1 episode
1977	Number 96: The Final Episode	Herself / Maggie Cameron	TV series, 1 episode
1977	The Outsiders	Guest role: Sylvia Canning	ABC TV series AUSTRALIA/GERMANY, 1 episode
1977	Glenview High	Guest role: Fiona	TV series, 1 episode
1978	Young Ramsay	Guest role: Rhonda Thompson	TV series, 1 episode
1978	Case for the Defence	Guest role: Joan Lattimer	TV series, 1 episode
1979	Chopper Squad	Guest role: Mrs. Docker	TV series, 1 episode
1979	Skyways	Guest role: Jasmin Lamont	TV series, 1 episode
1981	...Deadline...	Support role: Mrs. Ashby	TV film / pilot
1981	A Country Practice	Guest role: Mavis Carmody	TV series, 2 episodes
1984	Bodyline	Guest role: Lady Randall Rogers	TV miniseries, 1 episode
1986	Kids 21st Birthday Channel Ten Telethon	Guest - Herself with Number 96 cast: Johnny Lockwood, Pat McDonald, Elizabeth Kirkby, Vicki Raymond, Sheila Kennelly, Wendy Blacklock, Harry Michaels, Chard Hayward, Frances Hargreaves & Abigail taped appearance.	TV special
1987	Butterfly Island	Guest role	TV series, 1 episode
1988	The Dirtwater Dynasty	Guest role: Mrs. Tilly Seymour	TV miniseries, 1 episode

== Theatre ==
Welch having worked in her native New Zealand, continuing in her theatrical career after emigrating to Australia

NOTE: Selected early productions PRODUCER is Styled as STAGE DIRECTOR, whilst Director is referred to as operating venue etc. references attributed to AusStage compiled from Flinders University, Adelaide see here:

Production	Writer/Company	Year	No. of Shows.	Production status	Type/Genre
Biography	Samual Nathanial Behrman | Independent Theatre Company	1940	1	non-world premiere	Theatre - Spoken Word
Charley's Aunt	Brandon Thomas - Minerva Theatre by. Whitehall Productions	1940	1	professional, non-world premiere	Comedy Farce - theatre spoken word
It's A Girl	Austin Melford / Minerva Theatre for David N,. Martin Pty Ltd. (production firm)	1940	1	Professional, non-world premiere	Theatre - Spoken Word * Comedy - Drama - Musical Theatre
Room for Two	Gilbert Wakefield - Minerva Theatre for David N. Martin Pty. Ltd.	1940	1	Professional, non-world premiere	Theatre Spoken Word - Comedy
Design for Living	Noël Coward/ Minerva Theatre	1940	1	non-world premiere	Theatre - Spoken Word
Susan and God	Rachel Crothers / Minerva Theatre. His Majesty's Theatre	1941-1942	2	Professional, non-world premiere	Theatre (spoken word) - Comedy
You Can't Take it With You	Moss Hart/George S. Kaufman for J.C Williamson	1942	1	non-world premiere	Theatre - Spoken Word
The Man Who Came to Dinner	Moss Hart/George Kaufman - Presenting Company J.C Williamson Theatres for Whitehall Productions.	1942	1	US Text, non-world premiere	Theatre Spoken Word - Drama
Reunion in Vienna	Robert E. Sherwood - presented by J.C Williamson Theatres for Whitehall Productions|	1943	1	Professional, non-world premiere	Theatre Spoken Word - Drama
Robert's Wife	St. John Greer Ervine - Theatre Royal, Adelaide	1943	1	Professional, non-world premiere, part of a tour	Theatre spoken work British play (Irish text)
My Sister Eileen	Ruth McKenney - His Majestys Theatre, Brisbane	1943	2	non-worLd premiere	Theatre - Spoken word Comedy/Drama
Claudia (play)	Rose Franken His Majesty's Theatre, Auckland, New Zealand	1944	1	non-world premiere	Theatre spoken word Comedy
Arsenic and Old Lace	Joseph Kesselring - His Majesty's Theatre, Auckland, New Zealand	1944	1	no	Theatre - Spoken Word (Comedy - Farce)
Susan and God	Les King - His Majesty Theatre, Auckland, New Zealand - Opera House, Wellington - Theatre Royal Christchurch, His Majesty's Theatre, Dunedin.	1944	2	no original USA	Theatre - spoken word as Charlotte Morley
The Man Who Came to Dinner	Moss Hart, George Kaufman - His Majesty's Theatre, Auckland, New Zealand	1944	1	non-world premiere	Theatre - spoken word
Kiss and Tell	Hugh Herbert His Majesty's Theatre, Dunedin, New Zealand	1944	non-world premiere	1 (part of a tour)	Theatre spoken word (comedy)
Blithe Spirit	Noel Coward Theatre Royal - Sydney	1946	no	2	Theatre spoken word (genre Comedy - Supernatural )
Ways and Means, Family Album, Shadows Play	Noel Coward Comedy Theatre, Melbourne, Victoria	1946	no	3 (part of a tour)	One Act Plays - theatre (spoken word)
Smilin Thru	Allan Langdon Martin Theatre Royal, Sydney	1947	no	1	Music Theatre
No, No Nanette	Otto Hauerbach, Frank Mandel Theatre Royal, Sydney, New South Wales	1947	no	2	Musical Theatre
Under the Counter	Arthur MacCrae - St. James Theatre, Dunedin, New Zealand	1948	no	1 (part of a tour)	Theatre (spoken word)
Edward My Son	Robert Morley, Noel Langley	1949	no	2 (part of a tour)	Theatre - spoken word (Drama-Family)
Harvey	Mary Chase - Theatre Royal, Sydney	1950	no	3 (part of a tour)	Theatre - spoken word - (Comedy - Fantasy)
The Queen of Joy	James H. Lang Capitol Theatre, Haymarket, NSW	1953	no	2	Drama, religion
Hit and Run	William Orr - Phillip Street Theatre, Sydney, nsw	1955	no	2	Theatre - spoken word Revue
Simon and Laura	Alan Melville Theatre Royal, Sydney -	1955	no	2 (part of a tour)	Theatre - spoken word (Comedy, family)
The Deep Blue Sea	Terence Rattigan	1955/1956	no	3 (part of a tour)	Theatre - spoken word (drama, suicide)
Double Image	Roy Vickers	1957	no	3 (part of a tour)	Theatre spoken word
