= Fred Parslow =

Australian actor (1932–2017)

Fred Parslow AM
- Parslow in the TV-movie Burn the Butterflies (1979)
- Born: 14 August 1932
- Died: 26 January 2017 (aged 84); Caulfield, Victoria, Australia
- Occupation: Actor
- Years active: 1953-2000
- Known for: The Sullivans (TV series); Neighbours (TV series)
- Notable work: Actor with the Melbourne Theatre Company
- Spouse: Joan Harris (m. 1961; died 2016)
- Family: Justin Harris Parslow (son)

Frederick Henry Parslow AM (14 August 1932 – 26 January 2017) was an Australian actor who appeared in film, television and theatre.

== Acting career ==
Parslow was notable in several film and TV roles, with parts in internationally successful TV soap opera's The Sullivans and Neighbours and was active in theatre, having served as a member of the Melbourne Theatre Company for nearly thirty years, joining the company when it was founded in 1953, known then as the Union Theatre Repertory Company, and making his first performance in a touring production of Twelfth Night

Whilst a dominant figure on the Melbourne theatre scene, Parslow was generally reluctant to take on television roles. He made television appearances in the 1960s, in comedy and variety sketches with theatre colleagues on The Ray Taylor Show and In Melbourne Tonight. Minor roles included Crawford Productions staples Bluey, Skyways, and Cop Shop.

Parslow's also featured in several TV miniseries and TV films with roles in Against the Wind and The Humpty Dumpty Man

Parslow's cameo film roles included Alvin Purple (1973) as Alvin's father, and Peter Weir's 1977 film The Last Wave as Reverend Burton.

== Honours and personal life ==
Parslow was made a Member of the Order of Australia in 1987, for service to the performing arts.

In 1961 Parslow married Adelaide-born actress Joan Harris who was also a prominent theatre performer, starting from the mid-1940s. Harris was also an art director, theatre director and costume designer and teacher, who was Head of Drama at the National Theatre in Melbourne from 1972 until 1997. She predeceased him by five months in September 2016.

Parslow and Harris had a son Justin Harris Parslow who is also an actor.

== Filmography ==
=== Film ===
- As You Are (TV movie, 1958)
- Martine (TV movie, 1961) as Julien
- The Rivals (TV movie, 1961) as Captain Absolute
- Boy Round the Corner (TV movie, 1962)
- Suspect (TV movie, 1962) as Robert
- She'll Be Right (TV movie, 1962) as Guthrie
- Manhaul (TV movie, 1962) as Dr. Lewis
- Double Yolk (TV movie, 1963) as Bill
- Salome (TV movie, 1968) as Jokanaan
- Alvin Purple (1973) as Alvin’s Father
- The Last Wave (1977) as Reverend Burton
- The Importance of Keeping Perfectly Still (1977)
- Burn the Butterflies (TV movie, 1979)
- Pesticides In the Field (1983)
- A Long Way from Home (TV movie, 1988)
- Outback (1989)
- The Humpty Dumpty Man (1989)

=== Television ===
- The Adventures of the Terrible Ten (TV series, 1960)
- The Magic Boomerang (TV series, 1965)
- Adventure Unlimited (TV series, 1965) as Arthur Evans
- Australian Playhouse (TV series, 1966)
- Bluey (TV series, 1977) as Superintendent
- The Sullivans (1976–77, 76 episodes) as Mr Jarvis
- Against the Wind (TV miniseries, 1978) a Captain Wiltshire
- Cop Shop (TV series, 1979)
- Skyways (TV series, 1979) as David Rankin
- Space Knights (TV series, 1989)
- Neighbours (TV series, 1990)
- The Paper Man (TV miniseries, 1990)
- Col'n Carpenter (TV series, 1991)
- Mission Top Secret (TV series, 1993–1995) as Sir Joshua Cranberry
- Search for Treasure Island (TV series, 1998–2000)
