= The General Motors Hour =

Television series

The General Motors Hour was an Australian radio and television drama series.

== Radio ==
The radio series was a regular one hour drama broadcast over the Macquarie Radio Network at 8 pm on Thursdays. It is believed to have commenced in the late 1940s and lasted into the early 1960s. Producers included Robert Peach and Harry Dearth. The announcer was John Dease. 15 episodes are available on the RadioEchoes website.

== Television ==
The television version of The General Motors Hour was a loosely scheduled occasional series which aired on Australian television from 1960 to 1962. The series aired on ATN-7 in Sydney and GTV-9 in Melbourne, as well as on other affiliated stations across Australia. The presentations ranged from adaptations of overseas stage plays and anthology episodes, to locally-written drama and a documentary.

Its first show was a production of The Grey Nurse Said Nothing.

Three of the TV episodes - Suspect, Candida, and Shadow Of The Vine - had been produced by English producer Peter Cotes for HSV-7 in 1961, but were shelved due to lack of sponsorship. Sponsorship was provided by GM-H in 1962, and plays were run on HSV-7 and TCN-9 under the General Motors Hour title.

=== List of known TV episodes ===
- The Grey Nurse Said Nothing (1960, drama)
- This Is Television (1960, variety, documentary)
- Thunder on Sycamore Street (1960, drama)
- You, Too, Can Have a Body (1960, drama)
- Shadow of a Pale Horse (1960, drama)
- The Concert (1961, drama)
- Long Distance (1961)
- Suspect (1961, drama)
- Mystery of a Hansom Cab (1962, melodrama)
- The One Day of the Year (1962, drama)
- Candida (1961, comedy)
- Manhaul (1962, drama)
- Shadow of the Vine (1962, drama)

== See also ==
- Shell Presents - 1959-1960 occasional series
- Killer in Close-Up - 1957-1958 anthology of four half-hour plays on ABC
