= The One Day of the Year (film) =

- Genre: Drama
- Created by: Alan Seymour
- Based on: The One Day of the Year
- Screenplay by: John Sumner
- Directed by: Rod Kinnear
- Starring: Syd Conabere; Stewart Weller; Dennis Miller; Elaine Cusack; Bunney Brooke
- Country of origin: Australia
- Original language: English

Production
- Running time: 90 minutes

Original release
- Network: GTV-9
- Release: 7 July 1962 (Melbourne)

The One Day of the Year is a 1962 adaptation for Australian television of Alan Seymour's 1960 play about contested attitudes to Anzac Day.

== Plot ==
Alf’s son Hughie and his girlfriend Jan plan to document Anzac Day for the university newspaper, focusing on the drinking on Anzac Day. For the first time in his life Hughie refuses to attend the dawn service with Alf. When he watches the march on television at home with his mother and Wacka, he is torn between outrage at the display and love for his father.

== Cast ==
- Syd Conabere as Alf
- Stewart Weller as Wacka
- Dennis Miller as Hughie
- Elaine Cusack as Jan Castle
- Bunney Brooke as Dot Cook

It was directed by Rod Kinnear and adapted by John Sumner.

== Production ==
The production was produced by GTV-9 in Melbourne after a 16 week run of the play. It was estimated 300,000 would see the television production. Some of the language from the original play was cut.

It was the first of three plays of The General Motors Hour that year. The cast were all members of the Melbourne Union Theatre Repertory Company, which originally presented the play in Melbourne and toured three states.

== Reception ==
The TV critic for the Sydney Morning Herald said the shortened adaptation "suffered much less than might have been expected in its transfer" to television, saying it "sometimes tended to focus more sharply the growing and bitter awareness of the increasing estrangement between an ill-educated, soured lift-driver and his university student son. On the other hand, some scenes of richly meaningful theatrical impact missed badly."

The TV critic for The Age said the "subject of this play overshadow the acting and the sets, giving the production a sleek look that it did not entirely merit."

Frank Roberts, reviewing the TV adaptation in The Bulletin in 1962, called the play "bloody awful".

== Awards ==
The TV movie won Best Drama and Best Actor (for Syd Conabere) at the Logie Awards of 1963.
