= John Sumner (director) =

English-born director

John Sumner CBE, AO
- Born: John Hackman Sumner; 27 May 1924; England
- Died: 24 May 2013 (aged 88); Melbourne, Australia
- Education: National Opera Studio
- Occupations: Director; producer; theatre founder; artistic director; theatre manager; costume designer; set manager; author; administrator
- Years active: 1947–1987
- Known for: Manager and stage director at H.M. Tennent Theatres; Manager of the Australian Elizabethan Theatre Trust 1952-1955; Founder and director of the Melbourne Theatre Company 1953–1955, 1959–1987
- Spouse: Patsy King (m. 1959; div. 1967)
- Awards: Helpmann Award

John Hackman Sumner (27 May 1924 – 24 May 2013) was an English and Australian theatre director, producer and impresario. He was the founder and artistic director of the Melbourne Theatre Company in Australia, gathering a group of later internationally famous stars including Ray Lawler, Zoe Caldwell, Barry Humphries and Fred Parslow.

== Life and career ==
Sumner was born in England in May 1924. At an early age he attended the National Opera Studio (known then as the London Opera Studio). He served in the British Merchant Navy in World War II before commencing his career in theatre in 1947 in Dundee, Scotland, as an assistant stage manager. He later became a stage director and manager with H. M. Tennent Theatres in the West End of London before emigrating to Australia in 1952. In 1959, he married the actress Patsy King.

In 1953, Sumner established the Union Theatre Repertory Company (UTRC), which later became the Melbourne Theatre Company, where he was the artistic director until 1955. After a short time in Sydney managing the Australian Elizabethan Theatre Trust he returned to Melbourne and resumed his role as artistic director in 1959, continuing until 1987.

Sumner directed more than a hundred plays from Australia and overseas and established the Melbourne Theatre Company as a model for other state theatre companies. Her was involved in the television productions The One Day of the Year and Manhaul.

== Death ==
Sumner died in Melbourne on 24 May 2013 at the age of 88.

== Honours and awards ==
He was appointed Commander of the British Empire in 1971 and was made an Officer of the Order of Australia in 1985.

In 2009, the main performance space of the Melbourne Theatre Company's Southbank Theatre was named in his honour.

=== Helpmann Awards ===
The Helpmann Awards is an awards show, celebrating live entertainment and performing arts in Australia, presented by industry group Live Performance Australia (LPA) since 2001. In 2004, Sumner received the JC Williamson Award, the LPA's highest honour, for their life's work in live performance.

Year	Nominee / work	Award	Result
2004	Himself	JC Williamson Award	Awarded
