= Peter Cotes =

British actor and director (1912–1998)

Peter Cotes (19 March 1912 – 10 November 1998) was an English director, producer, actor, writer and production manager.

Cotes was born as Sydney Boulting in Maidenhead, Berkshire. His brothers John and Roy Boulting became noted film makers. He began as an actor, before concentrating on theatre production. He was the original director of the world's longest-running production The Mousetrap, still playing at the St Martins Theatre, London. He wrote several books, including an acclaimed biography of Charlie Chaplin in 1951.

Cotes travelled to Australia in 1961 to direct some television plays. He was fired during the filming of Bitter Harvest.

He was twice married: Myfanwy Jones (marriage annulled) and Joan Miller (widowed 1988). He died from natural causes in Chipping Norton, Oxfordshire, aged 86.

== Cinema and television credits ==
As actor

- Pal O'Mine (1936) ... Archie
- Pastor Hall (1940) ... Erwin Kohn
- Fingers (1941) (uncredited)
- The Gentle Sex (1943) (uncredited) ...Taffy
- Don't Take It to Heart (1944) ...Patterson, Junior Counsel
- The Way to the Stars (1945) ...Aircraftsman
- Beware of Pity (1946) ...Kosma
- The Upturned Glass (1947) ... Questioner

As writer

- London Playhouse (3 episodes, 1955–56)
  - Lady Must Sell (1955) (adaptation)
  - Summer in Normandy (1955) (production supervisor)
  - The Guv'nor (1956) TV episode (production supervisor)
- ITV Playhouse (1 episode 1956)
  - Ashes in the Wind (1956) (adaptation)
- ITV Play of the Week (1 episode 1965)
  - Winter in Ischia (1965) (television adaptation)

As producer

- London Playhouse (5 episodes 1955–56)
  - The Inward Eye (1955) (producer)
  - Lady Must Sell (1955) (producer)
  - Fighting Chance (1955) (producer)
  - Adeline Girard (1955) (supervising producer)
  - Yesterday's Mail (1956) (producer)
- ITV Playhouse
  - Woman in a Dressing Gown (1956) (producer)
- BBC Sunday Night Theatre
  - The Road (1953) (producer)
  - What the Public Wants (1959) (producer)
- The World of Wooster
  - Jeeves and the Delayed Exit of Claude and Eustice (1966) (associate producer)
  - Jeeves and the Indian Summer of an Uncle (1966) (associate producer)

As director

- BBC Sunday Night Theatre (1 episode 1953)
  - The Road (1953) (uncredited)
- The Right Person (1955)
- London Playhouse (3 episodes 1955–56)
  - Area Nine (1955)
  - Lady Must Sell (1955)
  - Yesterday's Mail (1956)
- Sword of Freedom (1 episode 1957)
  - Alessandro (1957)
- The Young and the Guilty (1958)
- ITV Television Playhouse (5 episodes 1956–58)
  - Ashes in the Wind (1956)
  - Woman in a Dressing Gown (1956)
  - The Young and the Guilty (1956)
  - Not Proven (1957)
  - Look in Any Window (1958)
- Shadow of the Vine (1962)
- ITV Play of the Week (1 episode 1964)
  - The Offence (1964) (TV episode)
- Janie Jones, at the New Theatre, London, (opened 15 July 1968)

== Selected theatre credits ==
- The Mousetrap (1952, director of original London stage production)
