= New Theatre =

New Theatre or New Theater may refer to:

== United Kingdom ==
- Hull New Theatre, a theatre in Kingston-upon-Hull, England
- Lisle's Tennis Court, Lincoln's Inn Fields, London, a former theatre known as the New Theatre in its first incarnation from 1695
- New Theatre, Cardiff, one of the main theatres in Cardiff, Wales
- New Theatre Oxford, the main commercial theatre in Oxford, England
- Noël Coward Theatre, London, known as the New Theatre from 1903 to 1972
- Nottingham New Theatre, the University of Nottingham's student-run theatre company and playhouse in Nottingham, England
- Theatre Royal, Bury St Edmunds, Suffolk, formerly the New Theatre

== United States ==
=== New York City ===
- Century Theatre (Central Park West) (1909–1931), formerly New Theatre
- New Theatre (off-Broadway) (1964–1974)
- Park Theatre (Manhattan) (1798–1848), formerly New Theatre
- Theatre on Nassau Street (1732–1758)

=== Other states ===
- Chestnut Street Theatre, Philadelphia, Pennsylvania, formerly New Theatre
- Holliday Street Theater, historical theatre in colonial Baltimore
- New Theatre (Fort Smith, Arkansas), historic theatre building

== Other countries ==
- Det Ny Teater (The New Theatre), an established theatre in Copenhagen, Denmark
- New Theatre, the former name of the resident theatre group at what is now Lensovet Theatre, Leningrad, Russia
- New Theatre, Dublin, Ireland
- New Theatre, Melbourne, Australia, 1970s theatre featuring Aboriginal actors such as Jack Charles
- New Theatre, Sydney, Australia
- New Theatre (Plzeň), Czech Republic
- Nya Teatern, former name of Swedish Theatre (Stockholm)
- Nya Teatern, former name of Mindre teatern in Stockholm, Sweden
- Werburgh Street Theatre, Dublin, Ireland, the first Dublin theatre (1637)

== Other uses ==
- New Theatre (magazine), a magazine dedicated to the dramatic arts, published by the New Theatre League in New York in the 1930s

== See also ==
- New Theatre Comique, 19th-century theatre in New York
- New Theatre League (disambiguation)
- New Theatre Quarterly, an academic journal
- New Theatre Royal Lincoln, in Lincoln, England
- New Theatres, Calcutta, India
