= Jeff Underhill =

Jeff Underhill may refer to:

- Jeff Underhill (writer)
- Jeff Underhill (politician)
