= Hilda Bull =

Australian public health physician (1886–1953)

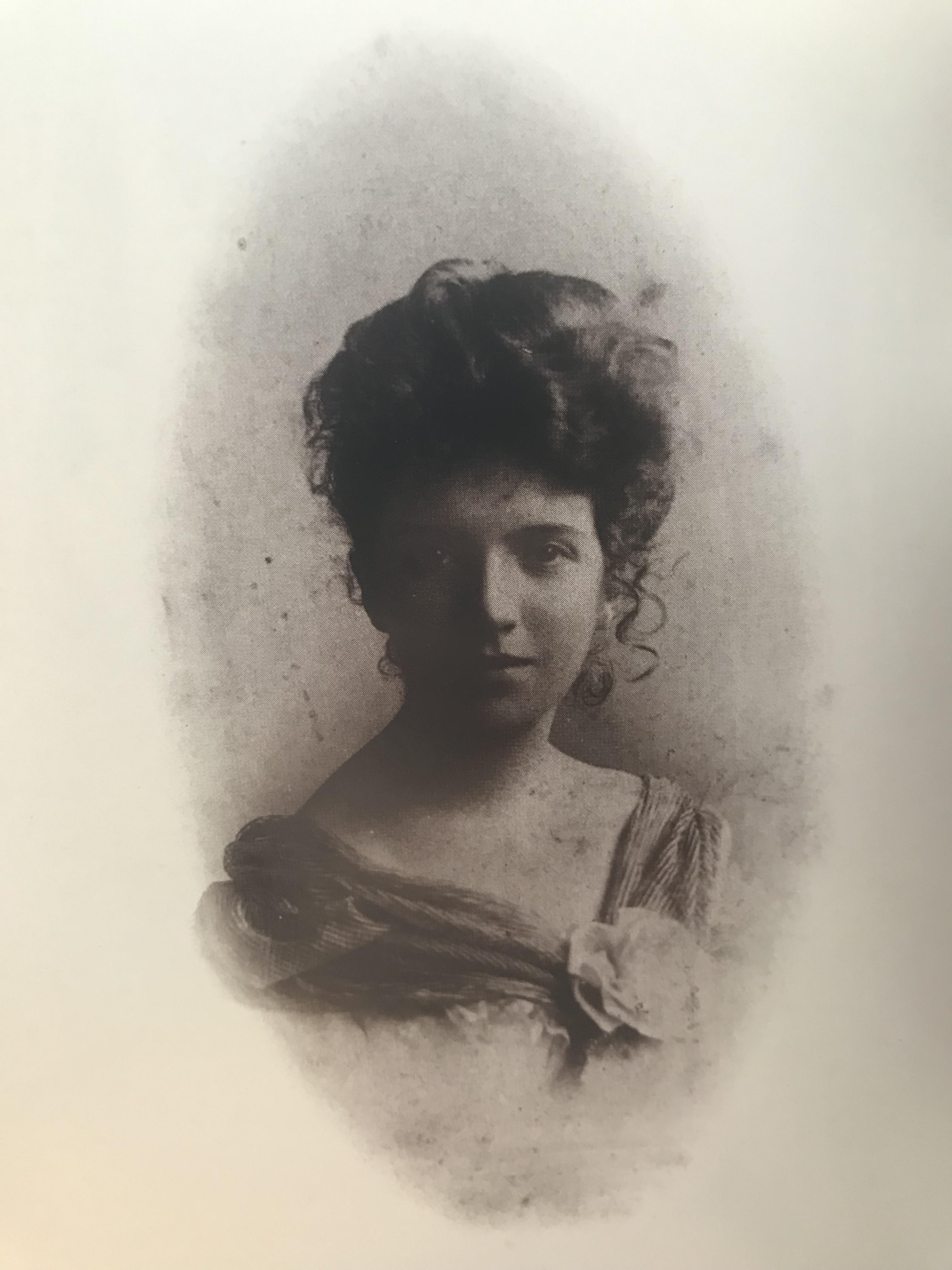
- Born: 2 July 1886; Waverley, New South Wales, Australia
- Died: 29 June 1953 (aged 66); Melbourne, Australia
- Occupation: Medical doctor
- Spouses: Louis Esson (m. 1913; died 1943) John Dale (m. 1951; died 1952)
- Children: 1

Hilda Bull (1886–1953), also known by her married names Hilda Esson and Hilda Dale, was an Australian public health physician and amateur actress and theatre director. She studied medicine at the University of Melbourne and worked as a doctor in London during the First World War, reaching the rank of lieutenant colonel in the British medical service. She later spent 23 years working as a medical officer for the Melbourne City Council and became known for her work in combatting infectious diseases. During her tenure, thousands of inoculations were delivered and the number of annual deaths from diphtheria fell from 14 to zero. She later expanded her work to addressing other communicable diseases and achieved worldwide recognition for her research into poliomyelitis.

Hilda was the wife of the playwright and author Louis Esson and assisted in researching and drafting many of his plays. She was a founding member of the Melbourne University Dramatic Society and acted in a number of plays performed by the Pioneer Players, an amateur theatre company founded by her husband. She later became involved in the New Theatre and directed 15 of their productions. She was actively involved in Australian literary circles throughout her life, including through her close lifelong friendship with the author Katharine Susannah Prichard.

Hilda eventually separated from Louis and entered a relationship with John Dale, the chief medical officer at the Melbourne City Council. They retired in 1950 and married in 1951 before moving to The Hague. In 1952, a car accident in Italy killed John and seriously injured Hilda. She eventually recovered from her injuries and moved back to Melbourne, but died six months later on 29 June 1953.

== Early life and education ==
Hilda Wager Bull was born into a wealthy family in Waverley, a suburb of Sydney, on 2 July 1886. Hilda's father Thomas Bull, who worked as a herbalist, was determined that all of his children would become doctors. Her mother Kate Marina Harris was a former teacher with high expectations of her children. The family moved from Sydney to the Melbourne suburb of Armadale when Hilda was a child, and then to the suburb of Ormond. She developed a close friendship with two of her fellow students at the Presbyterian Ladies' College, Nettie Palmer (née Higgins) and Christian Jollie Smith, as well as with her neighbour Katharine Susannah Prichard. While she eventually had a falling out with Smith, her close friendships and correspondence with Prichard and Palmer would endure throughout their lives.

After graduating from the Presbyterian Ladies' College in 1906, Hilda enrolled to study medicine at Melbourne University. She lived at Janet Clarke Hall and was involved in the Women Medical Students' Society. She was also a founding member of the Melbourne University Dramatic Society and played the lead role in a production of the play Hedda Gabler. During her time at university she participated in women's rights activist Vida Goldstein's campaign for a Senate seat. Hilda married Louis Esson, a playwright and writer associated with Melbourne's socialist circles, in December 1913. Their marriage was conducted by Charles Strong, the founder of the Australian Church. Hilda graduated shortly afterwards with a first-class degree in medicine and with a Bachelor of Science, and spent time as a post-graduate in the field of pathology.

== Career ==
Soon after Hilda's graduation and her marriage to Louis, the couple moved to Emerald. Hilda assisted in transcribing Louis' poetry, while Louis occupied himself by writing occasional pieces for The Bulletin. After Louis' efforts to enlist to fight in the First World War were refused on medical grounds, the couple moved to New York in late 1916. They moved into a small one-bedroom apartment in Greenwich Village before relocating to Broadway. Hilda and Louis quickly developed a strong dislike of the United States, perceiving its culture to be filled with nationalism and shallowness, and decided to move to London in September 1917 despite the dangers of wartime travel. Though Louis was not aware at the time, Hilda was motivated to move to London in part by her realisation that she was pregnant. Hilda did not wish to give birth in America, writing in a letter to a friend that she had chosen to "brave a long journey, submarines, starvation, and bombs round every corner, rather than bring another freeborn American into the world" and that she "couldn't bear to think that a child of mine should begin life with such a handicap".

In London, the couple moved into an apartment in Bloomsbury. On 2 May 1918, their first and only child, a son named Hugh, was born. Soon after their arrival, Hilda began working as a doctor for the first time since their marriage and took a job with the army conducting medical examinations of new recruits. She would eventually reach the rank of lieutenant colonel. She served as the medical officer in charge of a drafting depot and was eventually appointed the medical superintendent for the district of London. She became exhausted by the burdens of balancing her job with caring for her infant son, expressing her longing for Australia in letters to friends. In July 1921 the couple returned to Melbourne.

Upon their return to Australia, Hilda decided to establish her own printing press while Louis founded a theatre company, the Pioneer Players, to perform new works of Australian theatre. Just as Hilda was preparing for the printing of her first work, a collection of essays by the writer Vance Palmer, a fire consumed the Essons' house along with the printing press and Palmer's book. Hilda abandoned her goal of founding a printing press and returned to typing Louis' scripts and performing in his latest play, The Battler, as part of the Pioneer Players. Her performance in the role of Clara received mixed reviews. A review in The Bulletin labelled her performance "restless and unnatural", while The Australasian wrote that she was "hardly 'Australian' enough in accent to make the most of the part". The theatre company continued to struggle for a time and received a lukewarm reception. Hilda, who was the only member of the group without paid employment, took on the role of organising the company's productions. She found a new venue, St. Peter's Hall, and organised the company's 1923 program, which included Louis' latest play titled Mother and Son and a program of shorter plays by Australian writers like Katharine Susannah Prichard and John Le Gay Brereton. The company had some success, but continued to be beset by organisational problems and received diminishing attention from the press and the theatre audience. Some of Hilda's performances were well received; in 1923, The Sun News-Pictorial labelled her a "gifted" actress and wrote that she "never flagged" in her performance in the lead role of the play Anna Christie.

In 1923 the couple moved to Mallacoota in frustration at the problems that the Pioneer Players were facing. They spent their time there camping and exploring the bush. They soon returned to Melbourne, with Louis having drafted a novel and two new plays. By 1925, with the family beginning to come under financial strain, Hilda began to work part-time as a demonstrator in the medical faculty at Melbourne University. In 1926 she began to work as a relieving doctor at a practice in Fitzroy. She then set up her own medical practice, which she would run until mid-1927, and balanced her medical career with her continuing involvement in the administration of the Pioneer Players. In 1926, The Australian Worker noted her contributions to the Pioneer Players, writing that her "singleness of deed and vision is like undying fire".

=== Public health career ===
In mid-1927, Hilda applied for a job as an Assistant Medical Officer with the Melbourne City Council. She was interviewed by the Melbourne City Council's Medical Officer of Health, John Dale. Hilda was appointed to the position alongside Hilda Kincaid and was tasked with leading a campaign against diphtheria, which was among the most common causes of infant death in Melbourne at the time. Hilda quickly fell in love with Dale, although neither of them were willing to leave their spouses to pursue their mutual attraction. Hilda balanced her new career with assisting Louis in his research for his plays. Louis had found some work as theatre critic for the New Triad between 1924 and 1927, but experienced health issues and began to struggle to advance in his career as a playwright by the late 1920s.

Hilda was busy during this period working on the diphtheria campaign and studying towards her Diploma of Public Health. Within less than six months in her new position, Hilda visited 19 schools, gave a series of public lectures, and reported delivering 1723 inoculations and 1730 throat inspections. By 1931, her diphtheria campaign had treated 15,000 children. Diphtheria cases in the Melbourne City Council had grown by just 28%, well below the 50% increase recorded across the wider Melbourne area. The infant mortality rate in the city had also fallen from 8.19% to 5.43% between 1927 and 1931. In 1930, when Hilda was reappointed to her position on a salary of £550, it was estimated in The Herald that she had saved more than 300 children from diphtheria and that she had saved the council £5400 in treatment costs. In addition to her work at the council against infectious diseases, from around 1941 Hilda operated a psychiatric clinic for mothers and children in Carlton. She was also an active participant in the public health debates of her day. She advocated for better child nutrition, opposed the legalisation of euthanasia, called for action against tuberculosis amid a rise in the number of children being born to mothers suffering from the disease, and advocated for birth control.

Hilda's relationship with John became more public by the early 1930s, with the pair attending occasional events as a couple while Louis remained ill and reclusive. Hilda also became more active in left-wing politics. Hilda was committed to left-wing political ideas and causes, including the theory of social credit. She became involved in the New Theatre, a radical amateur theatre company, where she performed in a number of plays and directed 15 productions. She favoured realism and an ensemble approach, and founded a journal called The New Theatre Review that published articles on theatre technique alongside discussions of social and political issues. In 1939, Louis made the decision to move to Sydney, marking a more formal end to his relationship with Hilda, who continued to visit him a few times each year. On 27 November 1943, Louis died in Sydney.

== Later life ==
Hilda continued to direct a number of successful plays for the New Theatre, dedicating herself to her work after Louis' death. But her health soon began to decline and she eventually realised that she was suffering from some form of cancer. She underwent surgery in late 1948 and retired from the New Theatre. That same year, she finally moved in with John Dale as he moved to finalise his divorce from his wife. Hilda retired from her position at the council as Medical Officer for Communicable Disease Control on 23 November 1950 after 23 years of service, with her work having expanded from diphtheria prevention to include combatting other communicable diseases including measles, whooping cough, scarlet fever and poliomyelitis. She was reported to have achieved worldwide fame for her polio research. Newspapers also noted that during her tenure, deaths from diphtheria in the city had dropped from about 14 per year to zero.

After John joined her in retirement at the end of 1950, he was offered a position in The Hague as a medical assessor for those intending to migrate to Australia. As they prepared to make their move to the Hague, John's divorce was finalised in February 1951; he and Hilda married on 7 March and departed for Europe in early May. In 1952, they decided that they would take a holiday from the Hague and would travel by car through London, France and Italy. On 26 September, their car overturned near Verona, killing John and seriously injuring Hilda.

After three months in an Italian hospital and a month being cared for by her friend Catherine Duncan in Paris, Hilda recovered from her injuries. She returned to Melbourne, where she grieved John's death and occupied herself with the education of her infant granddaughter. She lived for another six months, before dying in Melbourne on 2 June 1953. Some contemporary newspapers reported that she had never fully recovered from injuries sustained in the car crash, while other sources give cancer as her cause of death. In 2016, Hilda was one of six women commemorated on a plaque recognising the service of Australian women doctors during the First World War.
