= John Gassner =

Hungarian-American theater historian, critic, educator, and anthologist

John Waldhorn Gassner (January 30, 1903 – April 2, 1967) was a Hungarian-born American theatre historian, critic, educator, and anthologist.

== Early life and education ==
At birth in the town of Máramarossziget, Hungary (today in Romania), he was given the name Jeno Waldhorn Gassner. He emigrated to the United States in 1911 with his family and soon discovered theatre performance at his local school. Only four years in New York, he appeared in a school production of The Tempest. Gassner graduated from Dewitt Clinton High School in The Bronx. In his youth and early adulthood, he was a supporter of Socialism. Gassner received a Bachelor of Arts (1923) degree and a Master of Arts (1924) degree from Columbia University.

== Writing career ==
Gassner was prolific and successful as a writer and editor. He began his career as a book reviewer at The New York Herald-Tribune (1925–1928), also wrote frequently for New Theatre Magazine (1934–1937), The Forum (1937), Time Magazine (1938), Direction (1937–1941), One Act Play Magazine (1937–1941), and among several others, The Tulane Drama Review (1957–1967). He became a member of TDR's advisory board in 1958.

== Literary, theatrical, and academic career ==
From 1931 to 1944, he was a play editor and later chairman of the Play Department of the Theatre Guild.

In 1940, he joined Erwin Piscator's Dramatic Workshop at the New School, where he taught playwriting and the history of theatre until 1949.

In 1956, Gassner accepted the prestigious post of Sterling Professor of Playwriting and Dramatic Literature at the Yale Drama School and remained there until his death. He also taught at Columbia University, Queens College, and Hunter College.

Gassner discovered and mentored writers who later attained fame in America and abroad, including Arthur Miller and Tennessee Williams. These two, in particular, shaped the development of the canon of American drama after World War II. Gassner's writings and teaching inspired figures in the American theatre, among them Joseph Papp and Richard Foreman. Papp turned to him for guidance and Foreman studied under him at Yale while completing his MFA in playwriting in 1962. Gassner mentored not only theater artists, but also editors like Edmund Fuller.

Gassner died of a heart ailment at the age of 64. In an obituary, the performance theorist, director, and TDR editor Richard Schechner wrote that Gassner was "a warm man" who had "a rare combination of humanity and intelligence." At the memorial service in New York City, playwright Robert Anderson and Yale dean Robert Brustein spoke.

== Anthologies and monographs (selection) ==
Gassner's anthologies appeared frequently and became a staple of the dramatic literature publishing world. Long after his death, even into the 1990s, Crown Publishers was issuing anthologies of The Best American Plays edited by other people but as part of the series called John Gassner Best Plays Series. His work as an editor and anthologist was ambitious enough to prompt Milton Esterow to remark in a review that "hardly a day seems to pass without the publication of a book by John Gassner."

- Best Plays of the Early American Theatre: From the Beginning to 1916
- The Reader's Encyclopedia of World Drama
- Twenty-five Best Plays of the Modern American Theatre: Early Series
- Twenty Best European plays on the American Stage
- Best American Plays (several different anthologies)
- Eugene O'Neill
- Producing the Play
- Masters of the Drama
- Treasury of the Theater

== Secondary sources ==
- Evelyn Mary MacQueen: John Gassner: Critic and Teacher. Ann Arbor, Mich., University Microfilms [1972], Dissertation, University of Michigan, 1966.

== Archival sources ==
Gassner's records are kept at the Ransom Center and, to a smaller extent, at Sterling Memorial Library at Yale.
