= New Theatre League =

New Theatre League may refer to:

- New Theatre League, the former name of the theatre company later renamed New Theatre, Sydney, Australia
- New Theatre League, New York, a group of theatre professionals that existed between 1935 and 1942 in New York City
