= Christian Jollie Smith =

Australian socialist lawyer

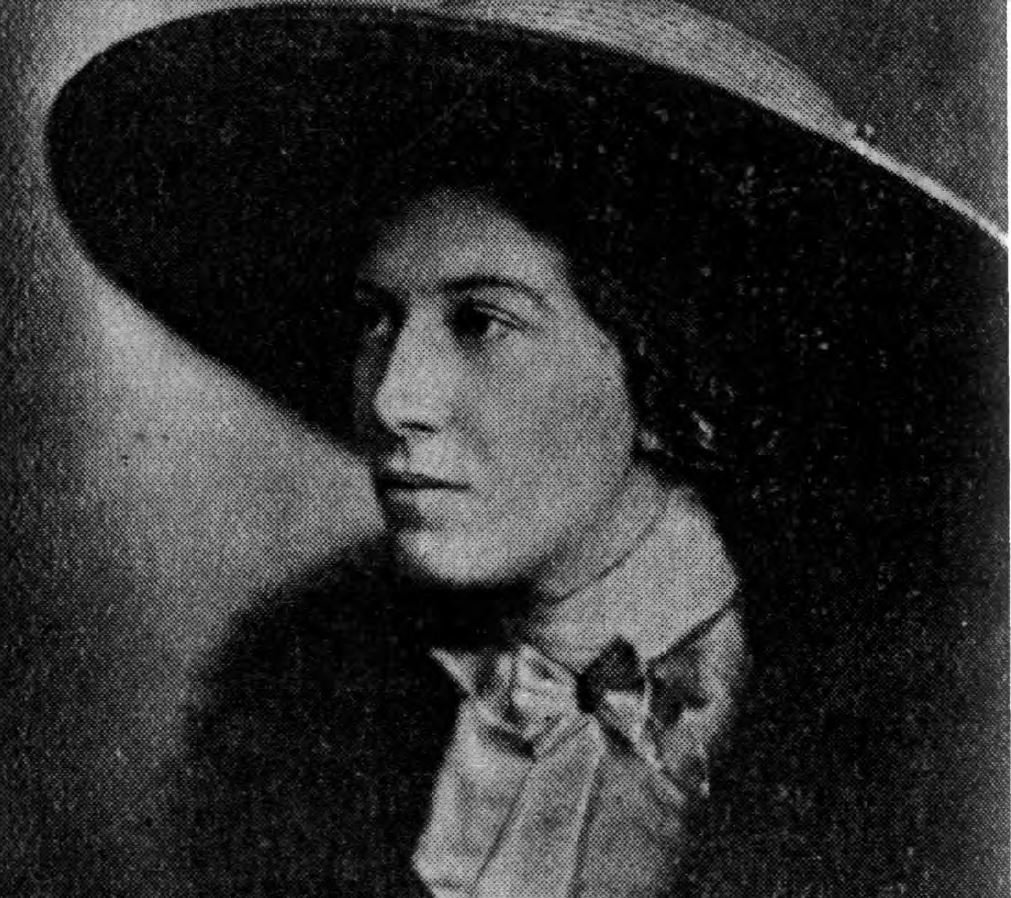

Assistant General Secretary of the Communist Party of Australia
- In office 1 April – December 1921
- General Secretary: Carl Baker (Acting)
- Preceded by: Position established
- Succeeded by: Position abolished

Assistant Secretary of the New South Wales Labour College
- In office 1919 – May 1923
- Secretary: William Earsman
- Preceded by: Position established

Personal details
- Born: Christian Brynhild Ochiltree Jollie Smith; 15 March 1885 Parkville, Colony of Victoria, British Empire
- Died: 14 January 1963 (aged 77) North Sydney, New South Wales, Australia
- Party: Communist Party of Australia
- Education: Melbourne University (LLB)

Christian Jollie Smith (15 March 1885 – 14 January 1963) was an Australian socialist lawyer and co-founder of the Communist Party of Australia. She was notable for her work representing striking miners, underprivileged tenants during the Great Depression and briefing legal counsel for the successful High Court challenges to the attempted exclusion of Egon Kisch from Australia and the Communist Party Act of 1951.

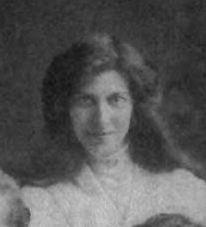
Smith, c. 1904.

Born Christian Brynhild Ochiltree Jollie Smith at Parkville, Melbourne, she was the daughter of Scottish-born Thomas Jollie Smith and his Victorian wife, Jessie (née Ochiltree). She was brought up in Naracoorte, South Australia, where her father was a Presbyterian minister. She was educated at home, later boarding at Presbyterian Ladies' College, Melbourne in 1903/04 in order to matriculate. She entered Trinity College, Melbourne in 1906 while studying law at the University of Melbourne (LL.B., 1911) and was introduced to socialism by a friend, Guido Baracchi. She belonged to a group of left-wing intellectuals including William Earsman, Louis and Hilda Esson, and Katharine Susannah Prichard, and was active in the anti-conscription campaigns of World War I.

Jollie Smith was admitted by the Supreme Court of Victoria as a solicitor in 1912, her sponsors being "Mr McArthur, KC and Mr Latham" (later a Chief Justice of Australia). In Victoria, she struggled for independence from her parents, working from 1914 onwards as a solicitor, teacher, journalist and briefly as a taxi-driver, in 1918 - the first woman taxi-driver in Melbourne, under the trade name "Pamela Brown").

In 1919, she taught English literature at Melbourne High and Brighton Grammar schools, and on moving to Sydney, at the Labor College of New South Wales. In December 1920, she became a foundation committee-member of the Communist Party of Australia and published the Sydney-based Australian Communist from 1920 to 1921.

Jollie Smith became the second woman to be admitted as a solicitor in New South Wales on 30 October 1924. She established her own practice dealing chiefly with political and industrial cases. During the attempted exclusion of Egon Kisch from Australia she briefed Albert Piddington and Maurice Blackburn who won appeals in the High Court of Australia against charges that he was a prohibited immigrant (successfully challenging the validity of the dictation test given).

In 1951, Jollie Smith briefed H. V. Evatt in a successful challenge to the validity of the act outlawing the Communist Party.

In 1956, with Brian Fitzpatrick, she helped draft Jessie Street's petition to change the constitutional rights of Indigenous Australians, a forerunner to the petitions for the 1967 referendum.

Jollie Smith never married. She remained lifelong friends with both Katharine Susannah Prichard and Nettie Palmer (a friend since PLC days). She died on 14 January 1963, aged 77, at North Sydney and was cremated with Presbyterian rites. The Australian Communist newspaper, Tribune, described her as one of the "most devoted fighters in the intellectual and professional fields" on behalf of the working class.

== Publications ==
- 1919 The Japanese Labor movement William Andrade, Melbourne.
