= Alice in Wonderland (1962 film) =

1962 television film

Alice in Wonderland is a 1962 Australian television film based on Lewis Carroll's 1865 novel Alice's Adventures in Wonderland. It was a pantomime and aired as part of the BP Super Show.

It aired 15 December 1962 and ran for one hour. It was one of a number of original Australian musicals on TV at the time.

== Cast ==
- Patricia Moore as Alice
- Kevin Colson as Knave of Hearts
- Noel Ferrier as Humpty Dumpty
- Bill Hodge as Duchess
- Chips Rafferty as White Knight
- Johnny Ladd as Queen of Hearts
- Brian Crossley as White Rabbit
- Bob Hornery as the Mad Hatter
- Ron Shand as the King of Hearts and the Walrus
- Roger McDougall as Cheshire Cat
- Fred Parslow as Mock Turtle and the Caterpillar
- Robina Beard as Dormouse
- Kevin Reagan
- Jim Gerald as Cook
- John Bailey as Tweedledee
- Ray Trickett as Tweedledum
- Ernie Bourne as the March Hare
- The Channel 9 Dancers

== Production ==
It was a version of the show presented at Melbourne's Comedy Theatre the year before. Noel Ferrier had pitched the idea of doing a pantomime at the Comedy Theatre to Sir Frank Tait, who agreed. Ferrier said the show was "a great financial success" and staging it "was a most enjoyable experience. I cannot think of many other ventures I have enjoyed as much."

It was especially written for television by Jeff Underhill, reportedly the first time the poem had been adapted for television. Bruce George wrote the music.

"Alice, as the central figure, provides the continuity," said Jeff Underhill, "and the scene changes take place round her in the almost magical way videotape allows."

There were 14 different scenes and eight songs. Noel Ferrier produced and his wife did the sets.

== Selected songs ==
- "Off with their heads"
- "A-sitting on a Gate"
- "Beautiful Soup"
- "You Are Old, Father William"

== Reception ==
The Sydney Morning Herald said the "production was not always successful in matching confusion with charm."
