= Lonnie Clark =

American politician

Member of the Kansas House of Representatives from the 65th district
- In office January 12, 2015 – January 9, 2023
- Preceded by: Allan Rothlisberg
- Succeeded by: Jeff Underhill

Personal details
- Born: January 1, 1944 (age 82) near Junction City, Kansas
- Party: Republican
- Education: Emporia State University; Drake University
- Profession: Sports and Medicine Administrator

Lonnie Gene Clark (born January 1, 1944) is an American politician. He served as a Republican member of the Kansas House of Representatives for the 65th district from 2015 to 2023. He is an Episcopalian.
