= New Theatre, Melbourne =

Former theatre group in Melbourne, Australia

The New Theatre in Melbourne, formerly Melbourne Workers' Theatre Group, was one of a number of branches of Australia's New Theatre movement established in the 1930s. This was a radical left theatrical movement which staged performances with a political message. The theatre group existed from 1936 until 2000.

== Background ==
New Theatre in Australia was inspired by similar movements abroad: the Workers Theatre Movement in the 1920s in the UK, and the New Theatre League in the United States. They were all affiliated with the Communist Party, and the plays were in the agitprop style of theatre favoured by the Soviet Union. Themes usually related to the class struggle. Referred to as workers' theatre in the early days, groups formed in other cities around Australia: the Workers Art Club in Sydney in 1932 (later New Theatre), Workers' Theatre Groups in Melbourne and Perth; similar groups in Brisbane, Newcastle, and Adelaide. Some disbanded and then got re-established, but only the Sydney's New Theatre is still in existence (as of 2022).

Themes explored in the productions were mostly related to exploitation of the working class, sexism, racism in Australia, and against war. It has been estimated that the total number of plays produced by all of the New Theatres was over 400.

== History ==
The Melbourne Workers' Theatre Group was founded as a non-professional group in 1936 by Frank Huelin and Betty Roland. It was affiliated to the Communist Party of Australia, and created by the Friends of the Soviet Union. In the early days the group produced short political sketches, which they often performed outdoors, including at factory gates. In 1936 the theatre group produced American playwright Clifford Odets' full-length play (their first) Waiting For Lefty, and later that year his Till the Day I Die. After the Nazi Consul General complained to the Commonwealth Government, the play was banned from being shown at Melbourne theatres, causing an outcry among the public. An attempt at a private performance at Collingwood Town Hall attracted a huge crowd, but did not proceed. Eventually, in February 1937, it was performed at Brunswick Town Hall.

The publicity created by the debacle led to greater membership of the Workers' Theatre Group. In 1937 it became affiliated with the New Theatre League in New York City, which had been established in 1935. At this time the Melbourne group renamed itself as the New Theatre Club, and started performing plays and satirical revues at various small venues which they established in the city, as well as at some larger commercial theatres, such as the Princess Theatre.

Architectural plans dated c. 1943 for a new building with the address given as 93 Flinders Street, Melbourne are kept in the archive, although AusStage records the address as no. 92 from 1942 onwards.

Hilda Esson (1886–1953) and Dot Thompson (1914–2001) were just two of the many women participating directors, actors, and writers. Aboriginal rights activists from the Aborigines Advancement League (AAL) also performed in several productions. Among these was White Justice, co-produced by the AAL and New Theatre in August 1946, based on the Pilbara strike in Western Australia. An excerpt from the play, which featured Bill Onus' brother Eric Onus and his wife Wynne, Reg Saunders, Doug Nicholls, and many then-residents of Fitzroy, was captured on 35mm film, making Onus possibly the first Aboriginal filmmaker. The story features in Bill Onus' grandson Tiriki Onus' film Ablaze.

New Theatre was the first theatre in Melbourne to stage works by international playwrights such as Bertolt Brecht. It also commissioned new Australian plays.

In the 1950s there were some successes. The Ballad of Angel's Alley: A Pocket Opera, by Jeff Underhill, was performed at the Flinders St theatre in December 1958 – January 1959. However, audiences were reducing in number, and the Cold War brought political pressures. The city theatre closed in 1959, and New Theatre became a suburban touring company. This focus continued even after Centre 63, a new city venue, opened in 1963. In 1964 Jack Charles had his stage debut at Centre 63, in A Raisin in the Sun. Charles and other Indigenous New Theatre actors went on to form the first Aboriginal theatre company, Nindethana Theatre, in 1971.

Interest in New Theatre revived in the 1960s, partly owing to opposition to Australian involvement in the Vietnam War. The company shared the Pram Factory in Carlton with the Australian Performing Group for a while, before moving into the Organ Factory in Clifton Hill in 1976.

Dot Thompson was director of the theatre in 1970, when she cast Jack Charles in South African playwright Athol Fugard's The Blood Knot.

New Theatre closed in 2000.

== Records ==
Many records, costume and set designs, audio-visual material and other items pertaining to the theatre are held in the Australian Performing Arts Collection. The collection includes copies of the New Theatre Review and personal papers of Dot Thompson.

== See also ==
- Melbourne Workers Theatre, 1987–2012
