= Night of the Ding-Dong =

1954 stage play by Ralph Peterson

Night of the Ding Dong
- Original language: English
- Written by: Ralph Peterson
- Subject: international relations
- Genre: comedy
- Setting: Adelaide

Premiere
- Date: 1954

Night of the Ding-Dong is a 1954 stage play by Ralph Peterson. It was this second play, following The Square Ring. It is a comedy set in Adelaide just after the Crimean War about the locals fearing a Russian invasion. It is based on a real incident.

== Plot ==
In 19th century Adelaide, after the Crimean War, Colonial Administrator Colonel Beauchamp trains a volunteer defence corps at the weekends, and worries about a Russian invasion. Idealistic schoolteacher Higsen, who is in love with Beauchamp's daughter, is more concerned with free education. Higsen asks Beauchamp to marry the latter's daughter but is turned down because education must give way to defence.

When a Russian gunboat is rumoured to be near Adelaide, Beauchamp sets about whipping up the public into a frenzy in order to fund a standing army.

== Background ==
Peterson said he was told the story about a rumoured Russian invasion by his grandmother when he was a child. He came across the story years later when researching another project and decided to write it. "It was amazing how Adelaide was completely swept away by the invasion scare," said Peterson. "Why, I don't know. Even Sydney folk were worried. This led to fortifications being built at Fort Denison, South Head and other places, while in Adelaide, Fort Glandore, Fort Glenelg, and later Fort Largs were built."

== 1958 British TV adaptation ==
Night of the Ding-Dong
- Based on: play by Ralph Peterson
- Written by: Peter John Dyer; John Nelson-Burton
- Country of origin: United Kingdom
- Original language: English

Production
- Running time: 60 minutes

Original release
- Release: 1958

The play was adapted for British TV in 1958 as part of Armchair Theatre.

=== Cast ===
- David Courtney as Marcus Higson
- Hilton Edwards as Colonel Beauchamp
- John Kidd as Morgan Nash
- Andree Melly as Louise Beauchamp
- Charles Morgan as Godwin Shedly
- Peter Myers as Thaddeus Beauchamp
- Athene Seyler as Mrs. Beauchamp senior
- Ewen Solon as Harry Kelp
- Joyce Worsley as Victoria Beauchamp

=== Reception ===
Variety said "What started out as an apparently serious and thought-provoking aplay quickly developed into rather pointless farce."

== 1961 Australian TV adaptation ==
Night of the Ding-Dong
- Genre: comedy
- Based on: play by Ralph Peterson
- Written by: Jeff Underhill
- Country of origin: Australia
- Original language: English

Production
- Running time: 60 mins or 45 mins
- Production company: ABC

Original release
- Network: ABC
- Release: 3 May 1961 (Melbourne, live)
- Release: 12 July 1961 (Sydney, taped)

The play was filmed for Australian TV. It originally aired 3 May 1961 on ABC's Melbourne station, and was recorded for showing on other ABC stations. The original broadcast was live.

Filmink magazine said the concept sounded "like the 1966 film The Russians Are Coming! The Russians Are Coming!."

=== Premise ===
In the 1870s the city of Adelaide fears a Russian invasion. Teacher Marcus Higson wishes to marry Victoria Beauchamp but her father, Colonel Beauchamp, refuses to give permission. Higson wants the government to introduce compulsory education but Colonel Beauchamp wants to spend money on defence.

A Russian ship is spotted off the coast of South Australia, prompting fear of invasion. Higson joins the militia led by Colonel Beauchamp.

=== Cast ===
- Michael Duffield as Col Beauchamp
- Madeline Howell as Victoria Beauchamp
- David Mitchell as Marcus Higson
- Anne Charleston as Louise
- Campbell Copelin as Mr Kelp
- Keith Hudson as Mr Smedly
- Charles Sinclair as Mr Nash
- Carole Potter as Abigail
- Roland Redshaw as Captain Manley
- Stewart Weller as Jeffries
- Eric Conway as gardener
- Nevil Thurgood as gardener

=== Production ===
The show was broadcast live from the ABC's studios in Melbourne. It was the TV debut for Ann Charleston.

The play was also adapted for radio on the ABC in 1961.

=== Reception ===
The critic from the Sydney Morning Herald thought that "uniform competence in acting could not-altogether suggest the whimsy inherent in" the play, adding that "William Sterling's production was directed primarily at extracting every ounce of farce."

== See also ==
- List of television plays broadcast on Australian Broadcasting Corporation (1960s)
