= Shawn Chauncey =

American politician

Member of the Kansas House of Representatives from the 65th district
- Incumbent
- Assumed office January 13, 2025
- Preceded by: Jeff Underhill

Personal details
- Party: Republican
- Profession: Contractor
- Website: shawnchaunceyforkansas.com

Shawn Chauncey is an American politician from Kansas that currently represents the 65th district of the Kansas House of Representatives since 2024 as a Republican.

== Biography ==
Chauncey was born and raised on a ranch in South Dakota. For the 27 years prior to his election to the Kansas House of Representatives, Chauncey worked as a construction contractor in Junction City.

=== Kansas House of Representatives ===
Chauncey launched a primary challenge to incumbent Representative Jeff Underhill on a platform that Underhill was too preoccupied also being a member of the Junction City Commission to adequately represent his constituents. Chauncey also pledged to seek to implement term-limits if elected. Chauncey would narrowly defeat Underhill with 504 votes to 413.

Chauncey would face off against Democratic challenger Lorraine M. Ceniceros during the general election. Chauncey would win with 57.02% of the vote to Ceniceros' 42.98%
