= Ron Shand =

Australian actor

- Born: Ronald Ernest McMurtry; 3 February 1906; Carlton, Melbourne, Australia
- Died: 8 August 1993 (aged 87); Sydney, New South Wales, Australia
- Other names: Ronnie Shand, Ronnie McMurtry, Wacko Shand
- Occupations: Dancer; comedian; Actor (radio, stage (including cabaret, pantomime, revue), television and film); circus performer; vaudevillian
- Years active: 1920–1991
- Known for: Number 96, The Benny Hill Show, Poor Man's Orange
- Spouse(s): Laurel Streeter, Letty Craydan
- Family: Iris Shand (1912–2000; actress, theatre director, stage manager)

Ronald Ernest McMurtry (3 February 1906, Carlton, Melbourne, Australia – 8 August 1993, Sydney, New South Wales, Australia), professionally known as Ron Shand and earlier in his career billed as Ronnie McMurtry and Wacko Shand was an Australian dancer, comedian and actor who worked extensively in numerously genres of the show business industry including, circus, soft shoe, theatre, cabaret, revue, vaudeville, radio, television and film in a career spanning over 70 years.

He started his career performing in circus and vaudeville, but was probably best known however in his later years for his role as the elderly hen-pecked pensioner husband of Dorrie Evans in television soap opera Number 96 and at 65 was then the oldest member of the regular cast. He continued to appear in TV and film roles into his mid-80s and died in August 1993, aged 87.

== Biography ==
=== Early life ===
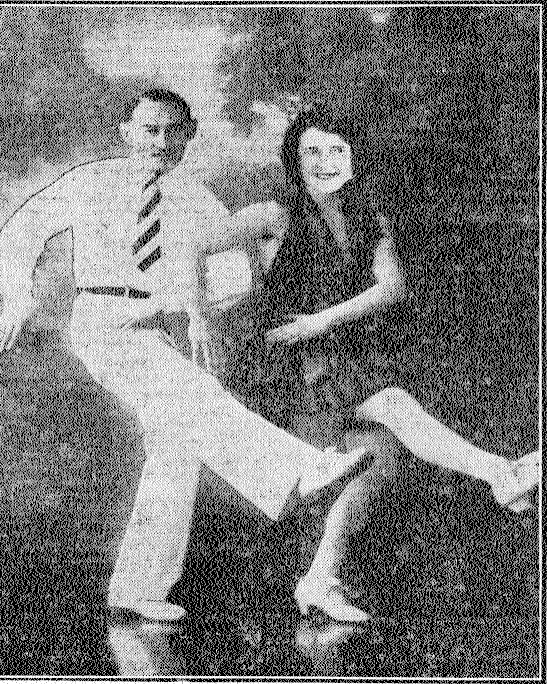
Shand with wife entertainer Letty Craydon

Shand came from a background in show business, particularly of circus performers, that spanned four generations on his mother's side and three generations on his father's side: his grandfather Patrick Montgomery was an Irish-born ringmaster and horse trainer and was married to Annie Gordon, who was half French and half Spanish.

Born to entertainer parents, his father, Ernest Shand, and mother were circus acrobats, with his father also an equestrian, they both had met at 19, while performing with the Fitzgerald's Circus. Ron was given the surname "Shand" by his grandparents who were travelling circus performers and Ron grew up with them in Melbourne.

== Career ==
=== Circus, vaudeville and theatre ===
Ron Shand started his showbiz career in 1920, with the circus as a clown aged just 14 and subsequently performed as a song and dance man in vaudeville, did tent shows and comedy for most of the 1920s with his first wife Laurel Streeter and dancer Eddie Clifford.

Shand started in theatre in 1931 and had numerous character roles throughout the 1930s and 1940s. He appeared in the Tivoli circuit for many years playing in revue and pantomime, before joining the J. C. Williamson theatre company for several seasons in musical comedy. Roles with J C Williamson included The Pajama Game, Can-Can, The Sentimental Bloke, and Sail Away produced by Noël Coward.

Shand was then one of the original members of the John Alden Shakespeare Company that toured all the capital cities of Australia. Shand played in several straight dramatic roles with the company, appearing in such plays as The Man Who Came to Dinner, Arsenic and Old Lace, Love Thy Neighbour and Bell, Book and Candle.

=== Television ===
Shand, by the early 1960s would move into the relative new medium of television appearing in several Australian television drama series, including Homicide and in the early 70s, with roles in Matlock Police, Division 4, among others.

Shand subsequently found his widest audiences through his portrayal of hen-pecked Herbert Evans, husband to shrill gossip Dorrie (Pat McDonald), in the phenomenally successful sex-comedy soap opera Number 96. Dorrie and Herb became two of the show's most popular figures and continued in the series for its entire 1972–1977 run. After the series ended, Shand acted in television dramas in guesting parts in The Young Doctors, A Country Practice, Prisoner and G.P., and the acclaimed miniseries Poor Man's Orange. He was also part of the cast of a 1977 The Benny Hill Show TV special made in Australia, in place of Hill's usual short, bald stooge Jackie Wright.

=== Personal life ===
Shand was married to performer Laurel Streeter and later actress and singer Letty Craydon (né Letitia Matilda Graydon; 1899–1965). He appeared with Letty in revues.

His younger sister, Iris Shand (né Thelma Hilda Shand; 1912-2000), was a soubrette, dancer and actress, as well as a theatre director and stage manager.

== Filmography (selected) ==
=== Film ===
Year	Title	Role	Notes
1961	Long Distance	Porter	TV movie
1952	Kangaroo	Accordion Player (uncredited)	Feature film
1960	Farewell, Farewell, Eugene	Mr Bosworth	TV movie
1962	Alice in Wonderland	The King of Hearts / The Walrus	Feature film
1966	They're a Weird Mob	Man at Racetrack (uncredited)	Feature film
1974	Number 96: The Movie	Herbert Evans	Film version
1982	Fluteman	Dicker	Feature film
1990	The Last Crop	Mr. Thompson	TV movie

=== Television ===
Year	Title	Role	Notes
1961	Whiplash	Publican (uncredited)	TV series
1962–64	Consider Your Verdict	Dicker	TV series
1966–68	Homicide	Jock Wilson / Arthur Wilkes / Alf Purcer	TV series
1968	Contrabandits	Mickey	TV series
1969	You Can't See 'round Corners	Punter	TV series
1969	Riptide	Baliff Napier	TV series
1968–69	Skippy	Ernie Stubbs / Gus	TV series
1970	The Long Arm	Zookeeper	TV series
1970	The Rovers	Jack Carter	TV series
1970	Mrs. Finnegan	Dan Smith	TV series
1971	Matlock Police	McPhee	TV series
1970–72	Division 4	Will 'Duff Duff' Duffy / Billy / Rabbit / Fred Miller	TV series
1972–77	Number 96	Herbert Evans	TV series ( 1 of 3 original cast members)
1977	Benny Hill Down Under	Various roles	TV special (fill-in for Jackie Wright)
1978	Father, Dear Father in Australia	Pickles	TV series
1979	Love Thy Neighbour in Australia	Arnold	TV series
1980	Menotti	Halliday	TV series
1981	The Young Doctors	Arthur Shepherd	TV series
1983	A Country Practice	Big Mac	TV series
1984	Prisoner	Pop Milsom	TV series
1987	Poor Man's Orange	Bumper Reily	TV miniseries
1988	Rafferty's Rules	Sid Clutten	TV series
1991	G.P.	Charlie Jackman	TV series

== Theatre ==
Date	Title	Company
	Bell, Book and Candle	John Alden Shakespeare Company
	Arsenic and Old Lace	John Alden Shakespeare Company
	The Man Who Came to Dinner	John Alden Shakespeare Company
	Can-Can	J C Williamson
1931	Hot and Strong	Grand Opera House
1931	Ace High	Grand Opera House
1931	Showers of Fun	Grand Opera House
1931	The Joy Makers	Grand Opera House
1931	Silver Clouds	Grand Opera House
1931	Tons of Fun	Grand Opera House
1931	Happy Hours	Grand Opera House
1931	Laughing Faces	Grand Opera House
1931	Fine and Dandy	Grand Opera House
1931	Gloom Tonics	Grand Opera House
1931	Keep Smiling	Grand Opera House
1931	Bubble and Squeak	Grand Opera House
1931	Bric-a-Brac	Grand Opera House
1931	Our Big Party	Grand Opera House
1931	Fun Spots	Grand Opera House
1931	Wise Cracks	Grand Opera House
1931	Sure Fire	Grand Opera House
1931	Meet Mabel	Grand Opera House
1931	A Good Time	Grand Opera House
1931	High Kicks	Grand Opera House
1931	Vanities	Grand Opera House
1931	Funbursts	Grand Opera House
1931	Bits of Fluff	Grand Opera House
1931	Ducks and Drakes	Grand Opera House
1931	Au Revoir	Grand Opera House
1934	White Horse Inn	Theatre Royal, Sydney
1935	Funrays	Civic Theatre, Sydney
1939	George Sorlie's Revue	Townsville
1939	Sorlie's Showboat Revue	Australian tour
1940	North China Troupe	His Majesty's Theatre, Perth, Kalgoorlie Town Hall, Peterborough Town Hall, SA, Crystal Theatre, Broken Hill, Theatre Royal, Adelaide, Theatre Royal, Hobart
1940	Oriental Nights	Tivoli Theatre, Melbourne
1941	Time of Your Life	Cremorne Theatre
1941	The Laughter Express	Cremorne Theatre
1941	Miles of Smiles	Cremorne Theatre
1942	You Can't Take It with You	Minerva Theatre, Sydney
1944	Katinka	His Majesty's Theatre, Melbourne
1944	Mother Goose	Theatre Royal, Adelaide
1945	Yells a Poppin	Cremorne Theatre
1946	Forbidden City	Tivoli Theatre, Melbourne
1952	The Merchant of Venice	Theatre Royal, Adelaide
1951-52	King Lear	Theatre Royal, Adelaide
1952	A Midsummer Night's Dream	Theatre Royal, Adelaide
1952	The Merry Wives of Windsor	His Majesty's Theatre, Perth, Theatre Royal, Adelaide, Comedy Theatre, Melbourne
1952	Dick Whittington and His Cat	Princess Theatre Melbourne
1956	The Teahouse of the August Moon	Victoria Theatre, Newcastle
1956	Ned Kelly	Elizabethan Theatre, Newtown
1957-58	The Pajama Game	J C Williamson at Theatre Royal, Adelaide, Empire Theatre, Sydney, His Majesty's Theatre, Brisbane, Her Majesty's Theatre, Melbourne
1959	Grab Me a Gondola	Theatre Royal, Adelaide, Empire Theatre, Sydney
1962	The Sentimental Bloke	J C Williamson at His Majesty's Theatre, Auckland, Theatre Royal, Sydney, Her Majesty's Theatre, Brisbane, Tivoli Theatre, Adelaide
1963	Sail Away	Melbourne & Sydney; J C Williamson; produced by Noël Coward
1964	Lilac Time	Tivoli Theatre Sydney, Tivoli Theatre, Melbourne
1964	The Wizard of Oz	Tivoli Theatre Sydney
1966	The Fantasticks	Phillip Street Theatre
1969	O'Vile Pretender (aka The Maiden and the Actor)	Neutral Bay Music Hall
1970	A Rum Do!	SGIO Theatre
1978	Love Thy Neighbour	Comedy Theatre, Melbourne, Theatre Royal, Sydney, Memorial Theatre, Ballarat
1985	Me and My Girl	State Theatre (Melbourne), Her Majesty's Theatre, Sydney
