= James Fritz =

British playwright (active 2023)

James Fritz is a British playwright known for Four Minutes Twelve Seconds, Parliament Square and The Flea. In reviews of The Flea during 2023, Claire Armitstead described Fritz as "one of the UK's most interesting playwrights" in the Guardian and Anya Ryan of Time Out called him "one of the most boundary-pushing playwrights working today".

== Career ==
Fritz studied writing at Royal Central School of Speech and Drama. In 2014 he wrote Four Minutes Twelve Seconds, which premiered at The Hampstead Theatre before transferring to Trafalgar Studios. His 2015 play Ross & Rachel debuted at the Edinburgh Fringe Festival before transferring to 59E59 Theaters in New York. The same year Parliament Square won Fritz a Bruntwood Prize and went on to open at Royal Exchange, Manchester in 2017. In 2023 his play The Flea about the Cleveland Street Scandal premiered at The Yard Theatre.

Fritz has also worked extensively in audio drama and has won Gold at the Audio and Radio Industry Awards on two separate occasions.

== Works ==
=== Stage ===
- 2011 - Lines
- 2014 - Four Minutes Twelve Seconds (winning Fritz Critics' Circle Theatre Award for Most Promising Playwright in 2015)
- 2015 - Ross & Rachel
- 2016 - The Fall
- 2017 - Start Swimming
- 2017 - Parliament Square
- 2018 and 2022 - Lava
- 2023 - The Flea

=== Radio plays ===
- 2016 - Comment is Free (winner of the Tinniswood Award and the Richard Imison award.)
- 2017 - Death Of A Cosmonaut
- 2020 - Eight Point Nine Nine (Winner of the Audio and Radio Industry Awards Gold Award for Best Fictional Storytelling)
- 2022 - Skyscraper Lullaby
- 2022 - Dear Harry Kane (Winner of the Audio and Radio Industry Awards Gold Award for Best Drama and the Prix Europa for Best European Audio Single Fiction of the Year.)
- 2023 - The Test Batter Can't Breathe
