= The Yard Theatre =

Theatre in London, England

Coordinates: 51.5427°N 0.0235°W

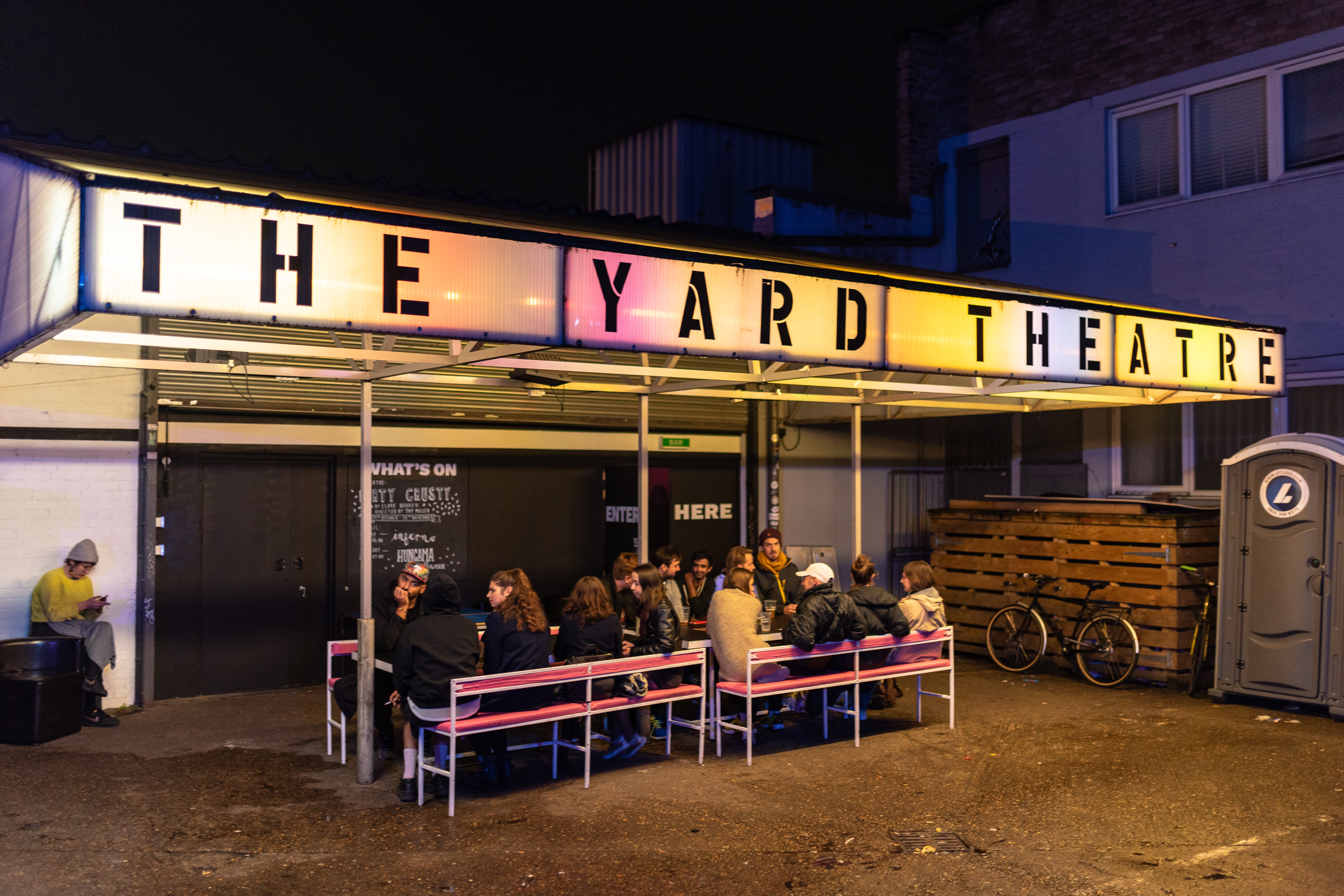
- Interactive map of The Yard Theatre
- Address: Unit 2A Queen's Yard, Hackney Wick; London; United Kingdom
- Operator: The Yard Theatre Ltd
- Capacity: 110 seats, 250 club capacity
- Type: Non-profit producing theatre, nightlife venue, community organisation
- Public transit: Hackney Wick

Construction
- Opened: 13 July 2011
- Years active: 2011–present
- Architect: Practice Architecture

Website
- www.theyardtheatre.co.uk

The Yard Theatre, opened in 2011, is a theatre in a converted warehouse in Hackney Wick in the London Borough of Tower Hamlets. It programmes theatre and performance, nightlife, and works with young people and its local community.

== History ==
The Yard was founded by Artistic Director Jay Miller in 2011, with support from Tarek Iskander, Sasha Milavic Davies and Alex Rennie. They worked with architectural firm Practice Architecture to convert a disused warehouse into a theatre and bar. Originally intended to have a 3-month life-span, The Yard became an Arts Council England National Portfolio Organisation in 2017. In 2016 it took over management of Hackney Wick community centre Hub67, and in 2019 took on The Hall in East Village, London Borough of Newham. In 2024, it was awarded a £700,000 from Arts Council England's Capital Investment Programme, part of a total estimated £6.5 million to build a new permanent venue.

Following its production of The Glass Menagerie in 2025, the theatre closed its doors to begin an ambitious redevelopment: to be rebuilt as a more permanent, purpose-built venue, doubling in size to expand what the theatre is able to offer to artists and audiences, designed by Takero Shimazaki Architects.

== Awards ==
The Yard was awarded the final Peter Brook Empty Space Award in 2013 and 2017, as well as the Dan Crawford Innovation Award in 2012. In 2025, The Yard was rewarded the Peter Brook Empty Space Award. In 2026, The Yard won their first Olivier Award for Best New Production in Affiliate Theatre for The Glass Menagerie.

== Programme ==
Shows that originated at The Yard include Michaela Coel’s Chewing Gum Dreams, which later transferred to the National Theatre and became the hit BBC show Chewing Gum. Its successful nightlife programme has been featured in national press, and in the New York Times.

Theatre productions include a gender-swapped production of Arthur Miller's The Crucible, the premiere of Pulitzer Award-winning writer Clare Barron’s Dirty Crusty, and an entirely digital day of online performance, Yard Online. From March 2020, The Yard took all of its community and young people's work online in response to the COVID-19 pandemic.

The Yard reopened after the pandemic with a season featuring Gracie Gardner's Athena, directed by Grace Gummer in conjunction with the National Theatre, alongside Lanre Malaolu's SAMSKARA and Dipo Baruwa-Etti's An unfinished man.

In 2022, they premiered Vinay Patel's reimagining of Anton Chekhov's The Cherry Orchard, set in space and featuring a fully South Asian cast. In 2023, they premiered James Fritz's The Flea, a retelling of the 1889 Cleveland Street Scandal. In 2024, they then premiered a season featuring HOTTER Project's The Last Show Before We Die, Rhianna Ilube's Samuel Takes a Break in Male Dungeon No. 5 After a Generally Successful Day of Tours about a fictional tour guide working at Ghana's Cape Coast Castle and Sami Ibrahim's Multiple Casualty Incident.

Founder Jay Miller's credits at The Yard Theatre have included The Flea by James Fritz, This Beautiful Future by Rita Kalnejais, The Crucible by Arthur Miller starring Emma D'Arcy,, Dirty Crusty by Clare Barron, Removal Men by MJ Harding, Lines by Pamela Carter, starring Ncuti Gatwa.

The Yard Theatre also programmes nightlife. Notable parties and collectives past and present include INFERNO, Pxssy Palace, Knickerbocker, Queer House Party, Mind Ur Head, T-Boys, GGI, DOOMSCROLL, Popola and Habibti Nation.
