= The Flea (play) =

Stage play about Cleveland Street scandal

- Original language: English
- Written by: James Fritz
- Based on: Cleveland Street scandal

Premiere
- Date: 11 October 2023
- Place: The Yard Theatre, Hackney Wick, London
- Directed by: Jay Miller
- Official website

The Flea is a 2023 British play by James Fritz, based on the Cleveland Street scandal. Directed by The Yard Theatre's Founder & Artistic Director Jay Miller, its premiere was scheduled to run at The Yard Theatre from 11 October to 18 November 2023 later extended to 2 December. The Flea returned to The Yard Theatre from 7 October to 9 November 2024.

The Australian premiere took place at New Theatre, Sydney under the direction and design of British theatre maker Patrick Kennedy from 4 February to 5 March 2025 garnering critical acclaim.

== Plot ==
A flea bites a rat, which frightens a horse, which kicks tanner Joseph Swinscow, killing him. This leaves his telegraph-boy son Charlie and widow Emily close to poverty until Charlie suddenly starts bringing in large sums. She does not question his story that these are bonuses until he is arrested by PC Luke Hanks after the latter finds an unusual amount of money in Charlie's locker whilst investigating a spate of thefts at his workplace. He explains to Hanks and his mother that he has been recruited by telegraph clerk Henry Newlove for a male brothel for upper class customers run by Charles Hammond, but soon goes silent, with Emily seeking help from her Member of Parliament Barwell. Meanwhile Euston and Lord Arthur Somerset discuss their gay relationships and Inspector Frederick Abberline faces the release of a hostile enquiry on his handling of the Whitechapel murders investigation and possibly being dishonourably discharged from the Metropolitan Police.

Despite doubts on Abberline's part, Hanks and Emily convince him to take on Charlie's case. Hanks and Abberline's interviews with Charlie and Newlove not only reveal the brothel's address (19 Cleveland Street) but also that it has protection from high figures in the nobility and police – the pair thus decide to keep their investigation secret from their superiors for the present. Abberline and Hanks go to the brothel, finding it empty but meeting Somerset, who had hoped to meet Algernon Allies, one of the boys employed there – Somerset is convinced they are lovers but Allies has stopped responding to his letters. Hanks and Abberline get Somerset to reveal he was a customer of the brothel and give him two days to get further information on it and its suspected financial backer from the high nobility. He discusses this with Euston, who is then blackmailed by that backer (Queen Victoria's eldest son Bertie) to reveal Somerset's involvement with the police to save Euston's own gay relationship. Bertie goes to see his mother, who initially refuses to clear up yet another of his messes but – after visions from God of the monarchy falling if she does not intervene or her becoming a byword for an age if she does – she decides to do so.

Somerset is forced to flee the country and to deny the truth that Bertie's son Eddy had attended the brothel. Hammond begins an escape to a bolt-hole in America promised him by Bertie, but he is murdered en route at Portsmouth, where Hanks and Abberline find his body with a fake suicide note. Soon afterwards the Met Commissioner forces them to drop the investigation, with Abberline bought off by the suppression of the Whitechapel report and Hanks offered a detective post. Unhappy with the situation, Hanks gives Emily a day's warning that the authorities intend to arrest Charlie and Newlove. Meanwhile, Barwell's party leader William Ewart Gladstone convinces him that the scandal could affect their chance of getting their progressive policies through Parliament and that he should bribe Emily to reveal Charlie's whereabouts by offering her enough money to buy the lease of her house. She gives in to that temptation and Charlie is arrested. On 22 January 1901 Charlie visits her at home, unable to repair their relationship and revealing to her that Queen Victoria has died earlier that day.

== Principal casts ==
Role	UK	UK	Australia
Role	2023	2024	2025
Charlie Swinscow / Bertie, Prince of Wales	Seamus Mclean Ross	Tomas Azocar-Nevin	Samuel Ireland
Emily Swinscow / Queen Victoria	Norah Lopez Holden	Brefni Holahan	Sofie Divall
Somerset / Newlove	Connor Finch	Stefan Race	James Collins
Abberline / Gladstone / Hammond	Scott Karim	Will Bliss	Mark Salvestro
Hanks / Barwell / Euston	Sonny Poon Tip	Aaron Gill	Jack Elliot Mitchell
