= Prince Albert Victor, Duke of Clarence and Avondale =

British prince (1864–1892)

Prince Albert Victor
- Duke of Clarence and Avondale
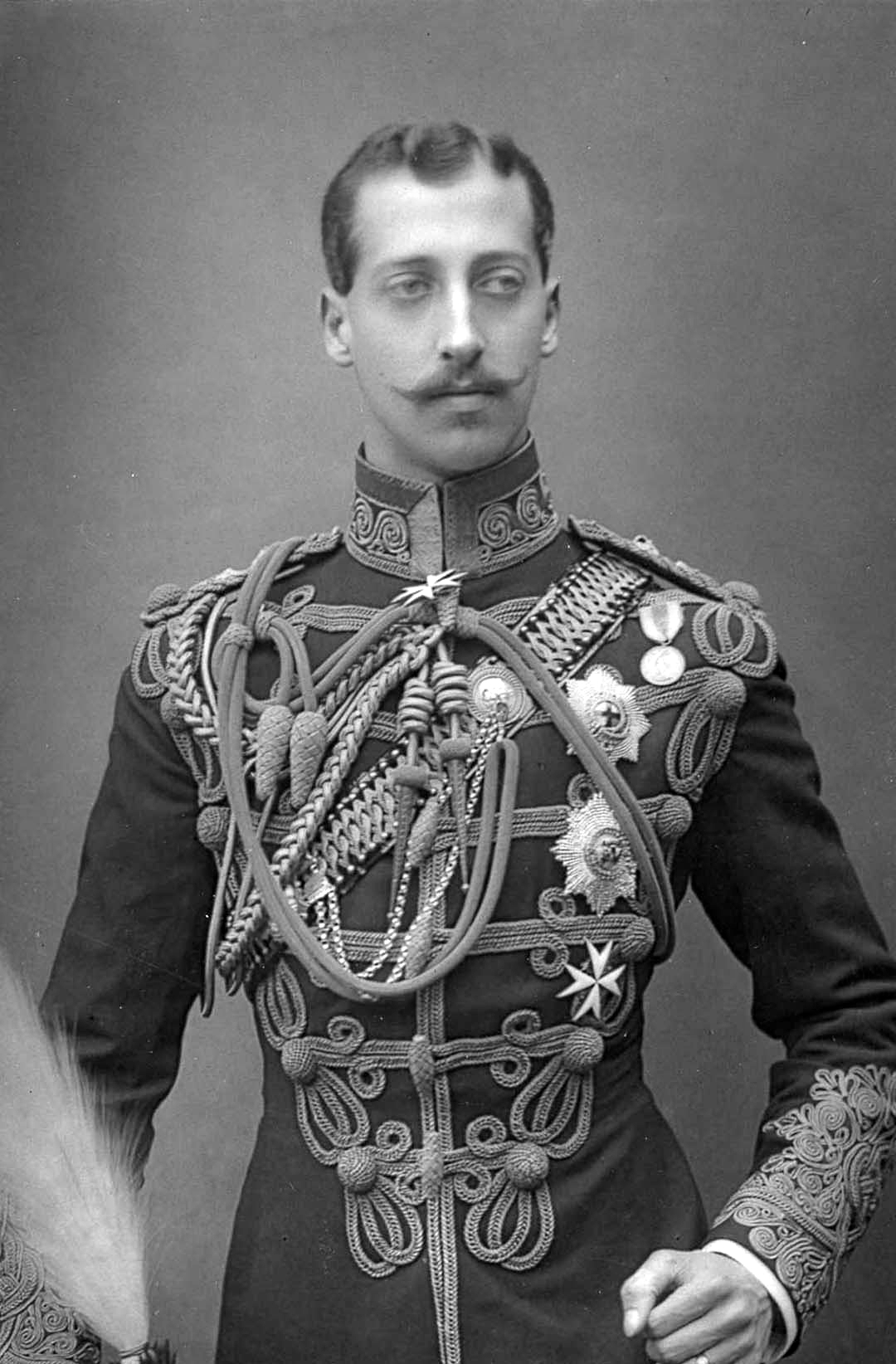
- Albert Victor c. 1891
- Born: Prince Albert Victor of Wales; 8 January 1864; Frogmore House, Windsor, Berkshire, England
- Died: 14 January 1892 (aged 28); Sandringham House, Norfolk, England
- Burial: 20 January 1892; Royal Vault, St George's Chapel, Windsor Castle; later moved to Albert Memorial Chapel, St George's Chapel
Names
- Albert Victor Christian Edward
- House: Saxe-Coburg and Gotha
- Father: Albert Edward, Prince of Wales (later Edward VII)
- Mother: Alexandra of Denmark
- Education: Trinity College, Cambridge

Prince Albert Victor, Duke of Clarence and Avondale (Albert Victor Christian Edward; 8 January 1864 – 14 January 1892), was the eldest child of the Prince and Princess of Wales (later King Edward VII and Queen Alexandra). From birth, he was second in the line of succession to the British throne, but did not become king or Prince of Wales because he died before both his father and paternal grandmother Queen Victoria.

Albert Victor was known to his family, and to many later biographers, as "Eddy". As a young man he travelled widely as a Royal Navy cadet, and as an adult he joined the British Army, though he undertook no active military duties. After two unsuccessful courtships, he became engaged in late 1891 to his second cousin once removed Princess Victoria Mary of Teck. A few weeks later, he died during a major influenza pandemic. Mary later married his younger brother, the future King George V.

Albert Victor's intellect, sexual orientation, and mental health have been the subject of speculation. Rumours in his lifetime linked him with the Cleveland Street scandal, which involved a homosexual brothel, but there is no conclusive evidence that he ever visited it or that he was homosexual. Some authors have theorised that he was the serial killer known as Jack the Ripper, or that he was otherwise involved in the murders, but contemporaneous documents show that Albert Victor could not have been in London at the time, and the claim is widely dismissed.

== Early life ==
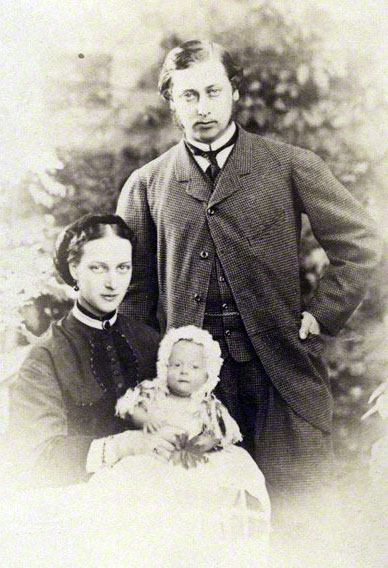
The new-born Albert Victor with his parents, 1864

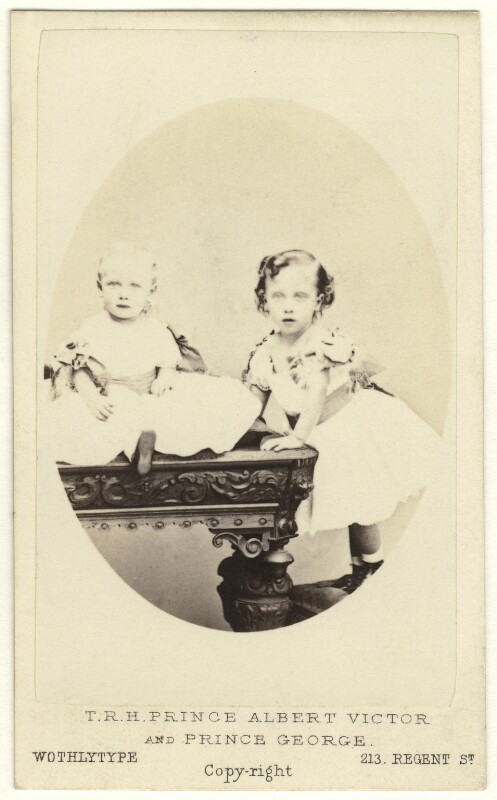
Albert Victor (right) with his brother George (left), 1866

Albert Victor was born two months prematurely at 8:58 pm on 8 January 1864 at Frogmore House, Windsor, Berkshire. He was the first child of Albert Edward, Prince of Wales, and his wife, Alexandra of Denmark. At Queen Victoria's wish, he was named Albert Victor after the Queen and her late husband, Prince Albert. As a grandson of the reigning British monarch in the male line and the son of the Prince of Wales, he was styled "His Royal Highness Prince Albert Victor of Wales" from birth. He was christened Albert Victor Christian Edward in the private chapel at Buckingham Palace on 10 March by the Archbishop of Canterbury, Charles Longley, and became known informally as "Eddy". (Note: His godparents were Queen Victoria (his paternal grandmother), King Christian IX of Denmark (his maternal grandfather, represented by his brother Prince Johann of Schleswig-Holstein-Sonderburg-Glücksburg), King Leopold I of Belgium (his great-granduncle), the Dowager Duchess of Schleswig-Holstein-Sonderburg-Glücksburg (his maternal great-grandmother, for whom the Duchess of Cambridge stood proxy), the Duchess of Saxe-Coburg and Gotha (his grandaunt by marriage, for whom the Grand Duchess of Mecklenburg-Strelitz stood proxy), the Landgrave of Hesse (his maternal great-grandfather, for whom Prince George, Duke of Cambridge, stood proxy), the Crown Princess of Prussia (his paternal aunt, for whom Princess Helena, her sister, stood proxy) and Prince Alfred (his paternal uncle). "No. 22832". The London Gazette. 14 March 1864. p. 1535.)

=== Education ===
In June 1865, when Albert Victor was just under 17 months old, his brother, Prince George (later George V), was born. Because of their closeness in age, the boys were educated together. In 1871, Queen Victoria appointed John Neale Dalton as their tutor. Dalton set a strict programme of study that combined academic subjects with games and military drills. Dalton complained that Albert Victor's mind was "abnormally dormant".

Although Albert Victor learnt to speak his mother's native Danish, his progress in other languages and subjects was slow. Sir Henry Ponsonby suspected that Albert Victor might have inherited Alexandra's partial deafness. He never excelled academically. Possible physical explanations for his inattention include absence seizures or the effects of premature birth, both of which can be associated with learning difficulties, though Lady Geraldine Somerset blamed Albert Victor's poor education on Dalton, whom she considered uninspiring.

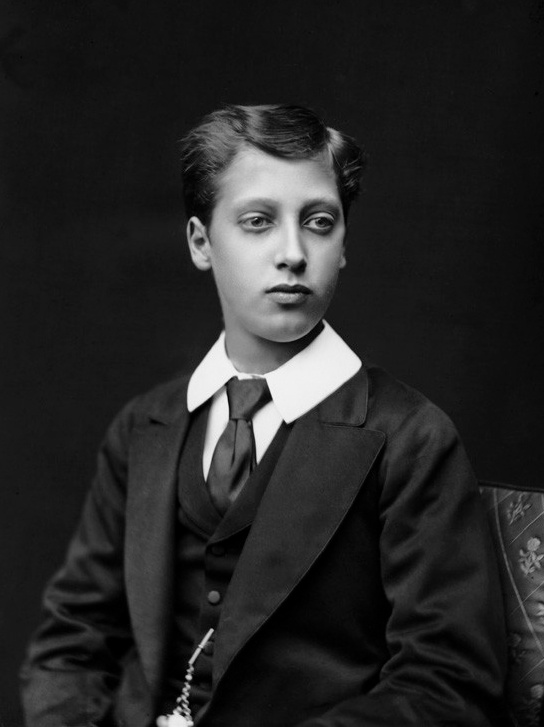
Albert Victor photographed by Alexander Bassano, 1875

Separating the brothers for the remainder of their education was considered, but Dalton advised against it, arguing that "Prince Albert Victor requires the stimulus of Prince George's company to induce him to work at all." In 1877, the boys were sent to the Royal Navy's training ship, HMS Britannia. They began their studies there two months behind the other cadets because Albert Victor contracted typhoid fever, for which he was treated by Sir William Gull. Dalton accompanied them as chaplain to the ship.

In 1879, after discussion between the Queen, the Prince of Wales, their households, and the Government, the brothers were sent as naval cadets on a three-year world tour aboard HMS Bacchante. Albert Victor was rated midshipman on his 16th birthday. They toured the British Empire, accompanied by Dalton, visiting the Americas, the Falkland Islands, South Africa, Australia, Fiji, the Far East, Singapore, Ceylon, Aden, Egypt, the Holy Land, and Greece. They acquired tattoos in Japan. By the time they returned to Britain, Albert Victor was 18.

The brothers were separated in 1883: George remained in the navy, while Albert Victor entered Trinity College, Cambridge. Before arriving at the university, he was expected to cram at Bachelor's Cottage, Sandringham, under the supervision of Dalton, a French instructor, Monsieur Hua, and a newly appointed tutor and companion, James Kenneth Stephen. Some biographers have described Stephen as a misogynist, though this has been questioned, and he may have felt emotionally attached to Albert Victor; whether his feelings were overtly homosexual is uncertain. Stephen was initially optimistic about tutoring the prince, but by the time the party was due to move to Cambridge he had concluded, "I do not think he can possibly derive much benefit from attending lectures at Cambridge ... He hardly knows the meaning of the words to read".

At the start of the new term in October, Albert Victor, Dalton, and Lieutenant Henderson from Bacchante moved into Nevile's Court at Trinity College, accommodation usually reserved for dons. Albert Victor showed little interest in the intellectual life of the university and was excused from examinations, though he did take part in undergraduate society. He was introduced to Oscar Browning, a noted don who hosted parties and "made pets of those undergraduates who were handsome and attractive", and became friendly with Dalton's godson, Alfred Fripp, who later served as his doctor and royal surgeon. It is not known whether he had any sexual experiences at Cambridge, though partners of either sex would have been available. In August 1884, he spent time at Heidelberg University studying German before returning to Cambridge. He left the university in 1885, having already served as a cadet in the 2nd Cambridge University Battalion, and was gazetted as an officer in the 10th Hussars. In 1888, he received an honorary degree from the university.

One of his instructors observed that Albert Victor learnt best by listening rather than reading or writing and had no difficulty retaining information, but Prince George, Duke of Cambridge, was less charitable, calling him "an inveterate and incurable dawdler". Princess Augusta of Cambridge was similarly dismissive, describing him as "si peu de chose" ("such a small thing").

Much of Albert Victor's time at Aldershot was spent drilling, which he disliked, though he enjoyed playing polo. In October 1886, while in Burnley to open a new hospital, he attended a match between Burnley F.C. and Bolton Wanderers at Turf Moor – the first visit to a professional football ground by a member of the royal family. To mark the occasion, Burnley received a set of kits embellished with the royal coat of arms. He passed his examinations and, in March 1887, was posted to Hounslow, where he was promoted to captain. He undertook more public engagements, visited Ireland and Gibraltar, and opened the Hammersmith suspension bridge in June 1887. A childhood friend later recalled that his private life was uneventful: "his brother officers had said that they would like to make a man of the world of him. Into that world he refused to be initiated."

== Cleveland Street scandal ==
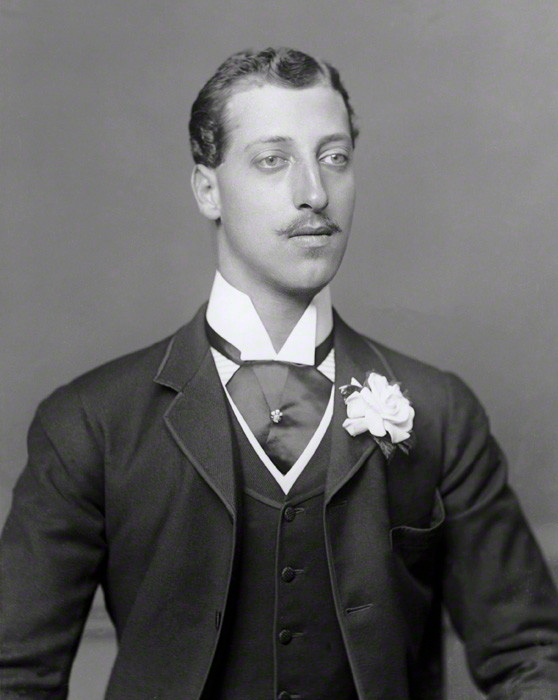
Albert Victor photographed by Bassano, c. 1888

In July 1889, the Metropolitan Police uncovered a male brothel operated by Charles Hammond in Cleveland Street, London. Under interrogation, the male prostitutes and pimps revealed the names of their clients, who included Lord Arthur Somerset, an Extra Equerry to the Prince of Wales. At the time, all homosexual acts between men were illegal, and those identified risked social ostracism, prosecution, and, at worst, two years' imprisonment with hard labour.

The resultant Cleveland Street scandal implicated other high-ranking figures in British society, and rumours swept upper-class London that a member of the royal family – specifically Albert Victor – was involved. The prostitutes had not named him, and it is suggested that Somerset's solicitor, Arthur Newton, fabricated and circulated the rumour to deflect attention from his client. Letters exchanged between the Treasury Solicitor, Sir Augustus Stephenson, and his assistant, Hamilton Cuffe, make coded reference to Newton's threats to implicate Albert Victor.

In December 1889, it was reported that the Prince and Princess of Wales were "daily assailed with anonymous letters of the most outrageous character" relating to the scandal. The Prince of Wales intervened in the investigation; no clients were ever prosecuted, and nothing against Albert Victor was proven. Sir Charles Russell was retained to monitor the proceedings on Albert Victor's behalf. Although there is no conclusive evidence for or against his involvement, or that he ever visited a homosexual club or brothel, the rumours and the cover-up have led some biographers to speculate that he did visit Cleveland Street, and that he was "possibly bisexual, probably homosexual". Other commentators dispute this, one describing him as "ardently heterosexual" and his association with the rumours as "somewhat unfair". Historian H. Montgomery Hyde wrote: "There is no evidence that he was homosexual, or even bisexual."

While English newspapers suppressed mention of Albert Victor's name in connection with the case, Welsh-language, colonial, and American newspapers were less restrained. The New York Times ridiculed him as a "dullard" and "stupid perverse boy" who would "never be allowed to ascend the British throne". According to one American report, when departing the Gare du Nord in Paris in May 1890, Albert Victor was cheered by a waiting crowd of English travellers but hissed and catcalled by some of the French. A journalist asked him to comment "as to the cause of his sudden departure from England". According to the report, "The Prince's sallow face turned scarlet and his eyes seemed to start from their orbits," and he had one of his companions rebuke the man for impertinence.

Somerset's sister, Lady Waterford, denied that her brother knew anything about Albert Victor. She wrote, "I am sure the boy is as straight as a line ... Arthur does not the least know how or where the boy spends his time ... he believes the boy to be perfectly innocent." She also believed Somerset's protestations of his own innocence. In surviving private letters to his friend Lord Esher, Somerset denied knowing anything directly about Albert Victor, but confirmed that he had heard the rumours and hoped they would help prevent any prosecution. He wrote:

I can quite understand the Prince of Wales being much annoyed at his son's name being coupled with the thing but that was the case before I left it ... we were both accused of going to this place but not together ... they will end by having out in open court exactly what they are all trying to keep quiet. I wonder if it is really a fact or only an invention of that arch ruffian H[ammond].

He continued:

I have never mentioned the boy's name except to Probyn, Montagu and Knollys when they were acting for me and I thought they ought to know. Had they been wise, hearing what I knew and therefore what others knew, they ought to have hushed the matter up, instead of stirring it up as they did, with all the authorities.

The rumours persisted. Sixty years later, the official biographer of George V, Harold Nicolson, was told by Lord Goddard – who was a twelve-year-old schoolboy at the time of the scandal – that Albert Victor "had been involved in a male brothel scene, and that a solicitor had to commit perjury to clear him. The solicitor was struck off the rolls for his offence, but was thereafter reinstated." In fact, none of the lawyers involved in the case was convicted of perjury or struck off during the scandal. Somerset's solicitor, Arthur Newton, was convicted of obstruction of justice for helping his clients escape abroad and was sentenced to six weeks in prison. Over twenty years later, in 1910, Newton was struck off for twelve months for professional misconduct after falsifying letters from another client, the murderer Dr Crippen. In 1913, he was struck off indefinitely and sentenced to three years' imprisonment for obtaining money by false pretences.

== Tour of India ==
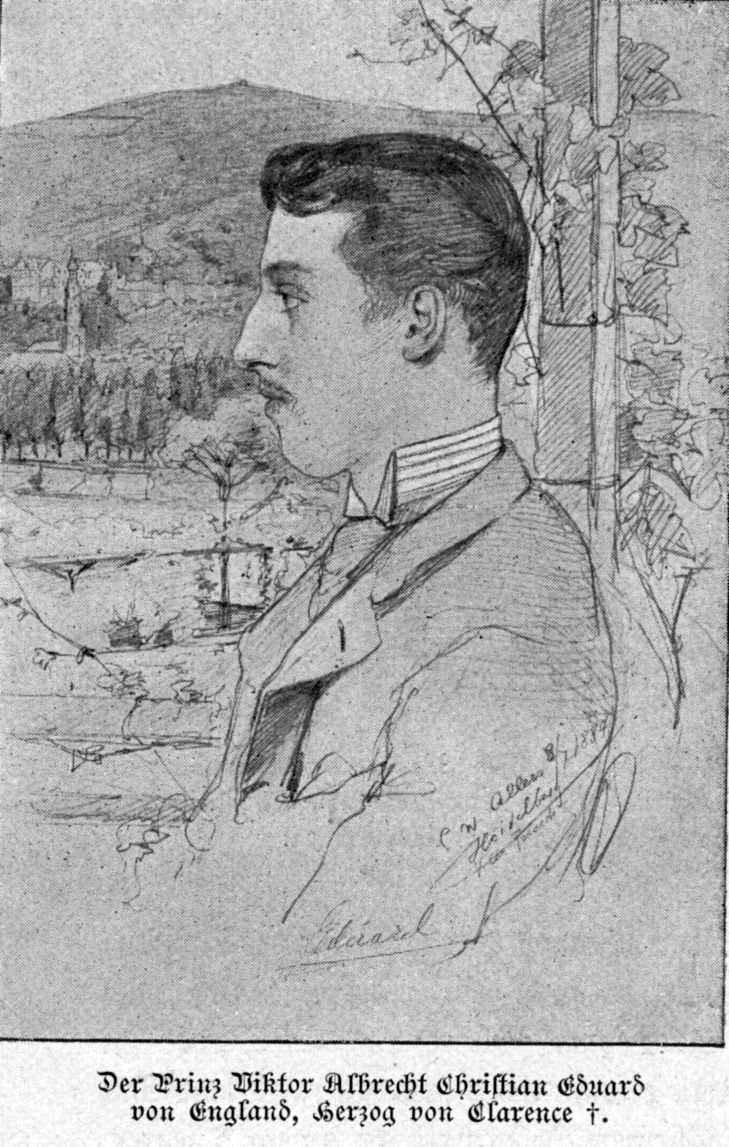
Sketch of Albert Victor by Christian Wilhelm Allers, 1887

The foreign press suggested that Albert Victor was sent on a seven-month tour of British India from October 1889 to escape the gossip that swept London society in the wake of the Cleveland Street scandal. In fact, the trip had been planned since the spring. Travelling via Athens, Port Said, Cairo, and Aden, Albert Victor arrived in Bombay on 9 November. He was entertained lavishly in Hyderabad by the Nizam, and elsewhere by many other maharajahs. In Bangalore, he laid the foundation stone of the Glass House at the Lalbagh Botanical Gardens on 30 November. He spent Christmas at Mandalay and the New Year at Calcutta. Most of the extensive travelling was done by train, although elephants were ridden as part of ceremonial processions. In the style of the time, a great many animals were shot for sport.

During the trip, Albert Victor met Margery Haddon, the wife of a civil engineer, Henry Haddon. After several failed marriages and following Albert Victor's death, Margery travelled to England and claimed that he was the father of her son, Clarence Haddon. There was no evidence to support the allegation, and her claims were dismissed. By this time she had become an alcoholic and appeared mentally unstable. The allegations were reported to Buckingham Palace, and the head of the Special Branch investigated. Papers in The National Archives show that neither courtiers nor Margery could produce any proof. In a statement to police, Albert Victor's lawyers admitted that there had been "some relations" between him and Mrs Haddon, but denied the claim of fatherhood.

In the 1920s, however, Clarence Haddon revived the story and published a book in the United States, My Uncle George V, in which he claimed he had been born in London in September 1890, about nine months after Albert Victor's meeting with Margery Haddon. In 1933, he was charged with demanding money with menace and attempted extortion after writing to the King asking for hush money. At his trial the following January, the prosecution produced documents showing that Haddon's enlistment papers, marriage certificate, officer's commission, demobilisation papers, and employment records all showed he was born in or before 1887, at least two years before Albert Victor met Mrs Haddon. Haddon was found guilty, and the judge, believing him to be suffering from delusions, did not imprison him but bound him over for three years on the condition that he made no further claim to be Albert Victor's son. Haddon breached the conditions and was imprisoned for a year. Dismissed as a crank, he died a broken man. Even if his claim had been true, it would have made no difference to the royal line of succession.

On his return from India, Albert Victor was created Duke of Clarence and Avondale and Earl of Athlone on 24 May 1890, Queen Victoria's 71st birthday.

== Potential brides ==
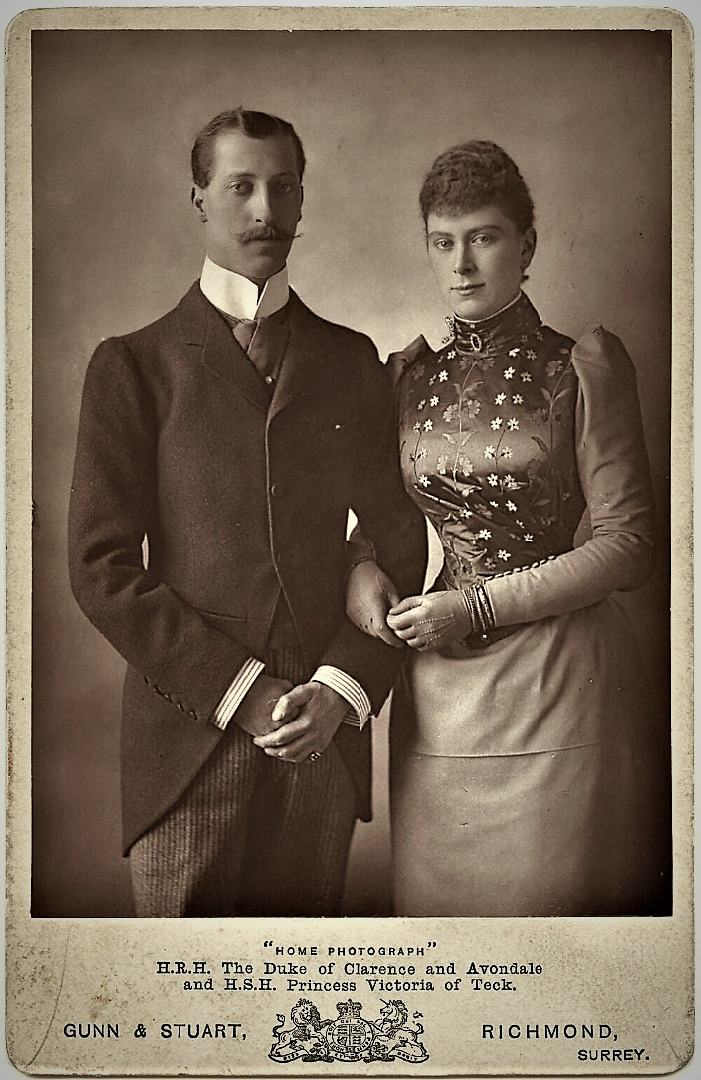
Albert Victor with Princess Victoria Mary of Teck, his fiancée, photographed in 1891

In 1889, Queen Victoria expressed her wish that Albert Victor should marry his cousin Princess Alix of Hesse and by Rhine, one of her favourite granddaughters. At Balmoral Castle, he proposed to Alix, but she did not reciprocate his feelings and declined the offer of engagement. He continued to hope she might change her mind, but finally abandoned the idea in 1890 when she sent him a letter explaining "how it grieves her to pain him, but that she cannot marry him, much as she likes him as a Cousin." In 1894, she married Tsar Nicholas II of Russia, another of Albert Victor's cousins.

After the proposed match with Alix fell through, the Queen suggested that Albert Victor marry another first cousin, Princess Margaret of Prussia. On 19 May 1890, she sent him a formal letter setting out her views on Margaret's suitability: "Of the few possible Princesses (for of course any Lady in Society would never do) I think no one more likely to suit you and the position better than your Cousin Mossy ... She is not regularly pretty but she has a very pretty figure, is very amiable and half English with great love for England which you will find in very few if any others." Although Albert Victor's father approved, Queen Victoria's secretary Henry Ponsonby informed her that Albert Victor's mother "would object most strongly and indeed has already done so." Nothing came of the suggestion.

By this time, however, Albert Victor had fallen in love with Princess Hélène of Orléans, a daughter of Prince Philippe, Count of Paris, a pretender to the French throne who had been living in England since his exile from France in 1886. Queen Victoria initially opposed any engagement because Hélène was Roman Catholic. Once Albert Victor and Hélène confided their feelings to her, the Queen relented and supported the proposed marriage. Hélène offered to convert to the Church of England, and Albert Victor offered to renounce his succession rights to marry her.

To the couple's disappointment, Hélène's father refused to allow the marriage and insisted she could not convert. Hélène travelled personally to intercede with Pope Leo XIII, but he upheld her father's decision, and the courtship ended. When Albert Victor died, his sisters Maud and Louise sympathised with Hélène and treated her, rather than his fiancée Princess Victoria Mary of Teck, as his true love. Maud told her that "he is buried with your little coin around his neck" and Louise said that he is "yours in death". Hélène later became Duchess of Aosta.

By 1891, another potential bride, Princess Victoria Mary of Teck (usually called May), was under consideration. May was the daughter of Queen Victoria's first cousin Princess Mary Adelaide, Duchess of Teck. The Queen was strongly supportive, considering May ideal – charming, sensible, and pretty. On 3 December 1891, Albert Victor, to May's "great surprise", proposed to her at Luton Hoo, the country residence of the Danish ambassador to Britain. The wedding was set for 27 February 1892.

== Personal life ==
In 1891, Albert Victor wrote to Lady Sybil St Clair Erskine that he was in love once again, though he did not say with whom. A week later, he asked her, "I wonder if you really love me a little? ... I should be very pleased if you did just a little bit."

In late 1891, Albert Victor was implicated in the case of Lydia Miller (stage name Lydia Manton), a former Gaiety Theatre chorus girl who committed suicide by drinking carbolic acid. Although she was the nominal mistress of Lord Charles Montagu, who gave evidence at the inquest, it was alleged that Montagu acted as a cover for Albert Victor, who had supposedly asked her to abandon her theatrical career on his behalf. It was further claimed that the authorities sought to suppress the case by holding the inquest in private and refusing access to the depositions. As with the Cleveland Street scandal, only overseas newspapers printed Albert Victor's name, but some regional British papers quoted the radical London newspaper The Star, which wrote: "It is a fact so well known that the blind denials of it given in some quarters are childishly futile. Lydia Manton was the petite amie of a certain young prince, and that, too, quite recently." The affair was described as "a scandal of the first magnitude ... on the lips of every clubman", and compared to the Tranby Croft affair, in which his father had been called to give evidence at a slander trial.

Rumours resurfaced in 1900, after Albert Victor's death, of his association with another former Gaiety girl, Maude Richardson (born Louisa Lancey), and that the royal family had attempted to pay her off. In 2002, letters purportedly sent by Albert Victor to his solicitor referring to a £200 payment to Richardson were sold at Bonhams auction house in London. Owing to discrepancies in the dates and spelling, one historian has suggested that the letters may be forgeries.

In mid‑1890, Albert Victor was attended by several doctors. In his correspondence and that of others, his illness was referred to only as "fever" or "gout". Some biographers have assumed he was suffering from "a mild form of venereal disease", perhaps gonorrhea, which he may have contracted on an earlier occasion, but the exact nature of his illness is unknown. Letters dated 1885 and 1886 from Albert Victor to his doctor at Aldershot (known only as "Roche") show that he was taking medicine for "glete" (gleet), then a term for gonorrhoea discharge.

== Death ==
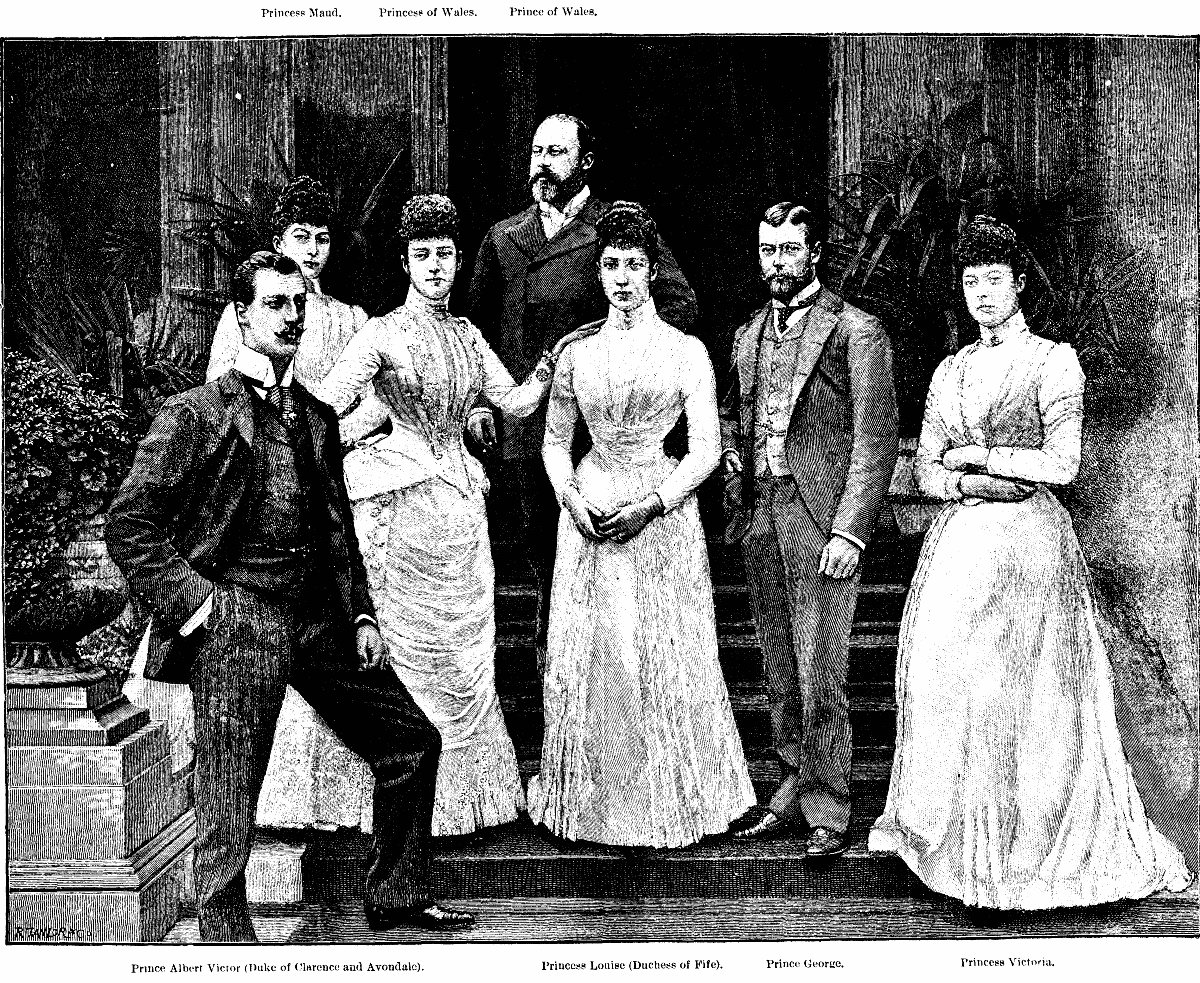
Albert Victor's family illustrated in 1891 (based on a photograph from 1889): (left to right) Prince Albert Victor, Princess Maud, the Princess of Wales, the Prince of Wales, Princess Louise, Prince George and Princess Victoria

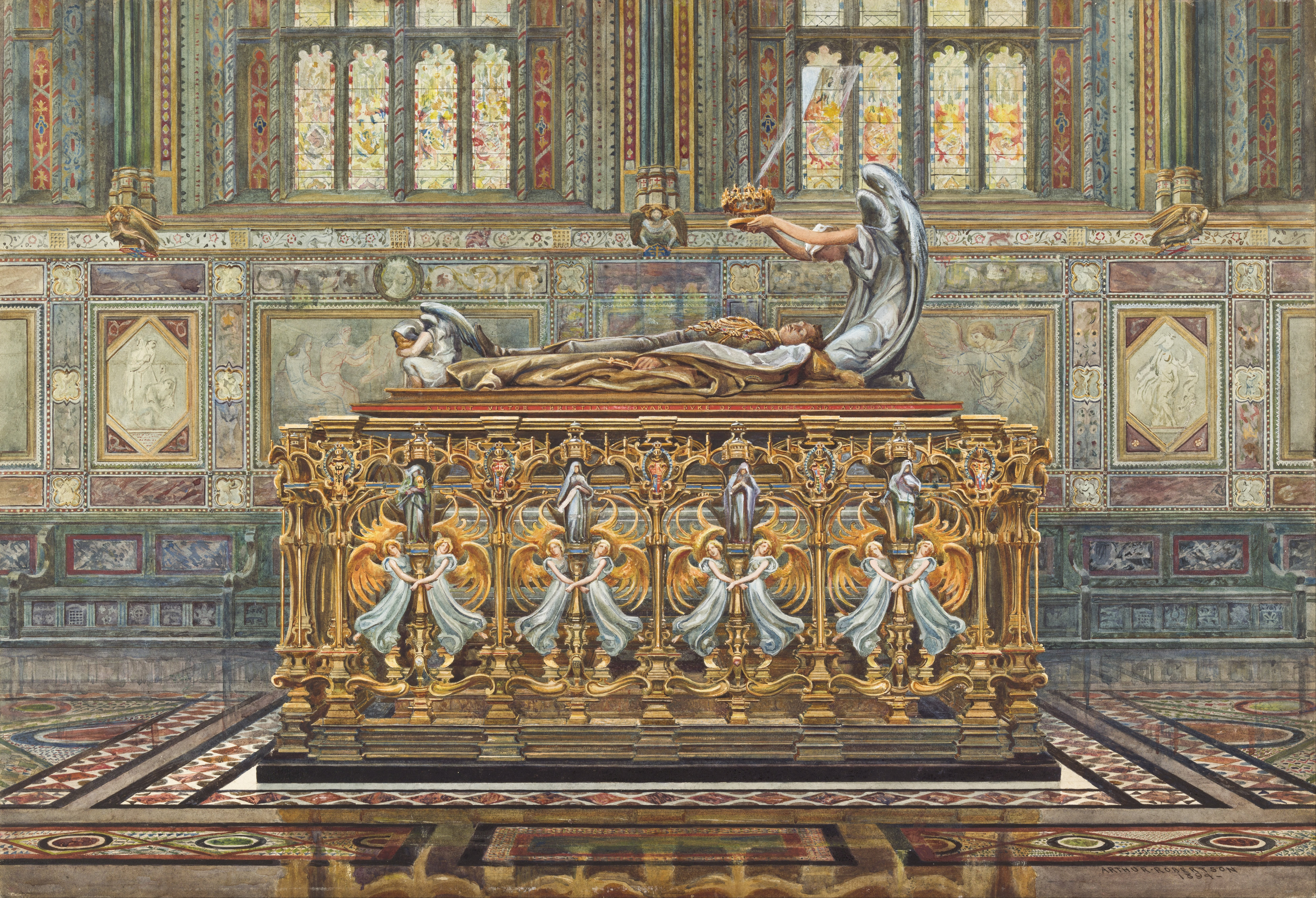
Alfred Gilbert's design for Albert Victor's tomb in the Albert Memorial Chapel close to St George's Chapel, Windsor Castle

Just as plans for both his marriage and his appointment as Viceroy of Ireland were under discussion, Albert Victor fell ill during the influenza pandemic of 1889–1892. He developed pneumonia and died on 14 January 1892 at Sandringham House in Norfolk, less than a week after his 28th birthday.

Albert Victor's parents, his sisters Maud and Victoria, his brother George, his fiancée Mary, her parents the Duke and Duchess of Teck, three physicians (Alan Reeve Manby, Francis Laking, and William Broadbent), and three nurses were present at his bedside. The Prince of Wales's chaplain, Canon Frederick Hervey, stood over Albert Victor reading prayers for the dying.

The nation was shocked. Shops closed their shutters. The Prince of Wales wrote to the Queen, "Gladly would I have given my life for his". Mary wrote to the Queen about the Princess of Wales, "the despairing look on her face was the most heart-rending thing I have ever seen." George wrote, "how deeply I did love him; & I remember with pain nearly every hard word & little quarrel I ever had with him & I long to ask his forgiveness, but, alas, it is too late now!" George took Albert Victor's place in the line of succession, eventually succeeding to the throne as George V in 1910. Drawn together during their shared mourning, George later married Mary in 1893. She became queen consort on his accession.

Albert Victor's mother, Alexandra, never fully recovered from his death and kept the room in which he died as a shrine. At the funeral, Mary laid her intended bridal wreath of orange blossom upon the coffin. James Kenneth Stephen, Albert Victor's former tutor, refused all food from the day of his death and died 20 days later; Stephen had suffered a head injury in 1886 that left him prone to psychosis.

Albert Victor is buried in the Albert Memorial Chapel, close to St George's Chapel, Windsor Castle. His tomb, by Alfred Gilbert, is described as "the finest single example of late 19th-century sculpture in the British Isles". A recumbent effigy of Albert Victor in a Hussar uniform (almost impossible to see properly in situ) lies above the tomb, over which kneels an angel holding a heavenly crown. The tomb is surrounded by an elaborate railing with figures of saints. Gilbert, a perfectionist, overspent on the commission, went bankrupt, and left the country. Five of the smaller figures were completed only after his return to Britain in the 1920s, with "a greater roughness and pittedness of texture".

One obituary, written by a journalist who claimed to have attended most of Albert Victor's public appearances, stated:

He was little known personally to the English public. His absence at sea, and on travels and duty with his regiment, kept him out of the general eye ... at times, there was a sallowness of hue, which much increased the grave aspect ... not only in the metropolis, but throughout the country, somehow, it was always said, 'He will never come to the throne.'

== Legacy ==
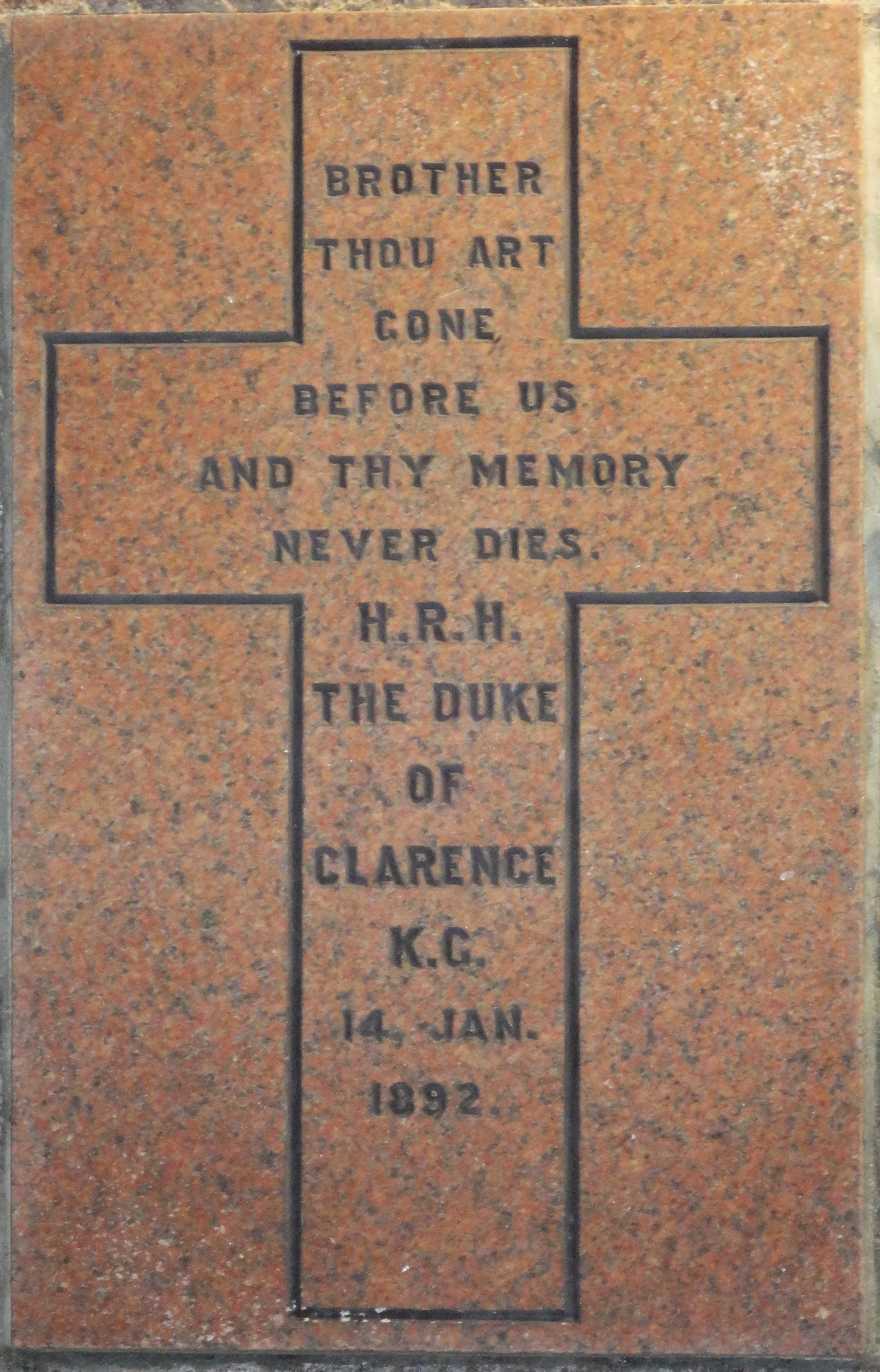
Memorial plaque, St Ninian's Chapel, Braemar

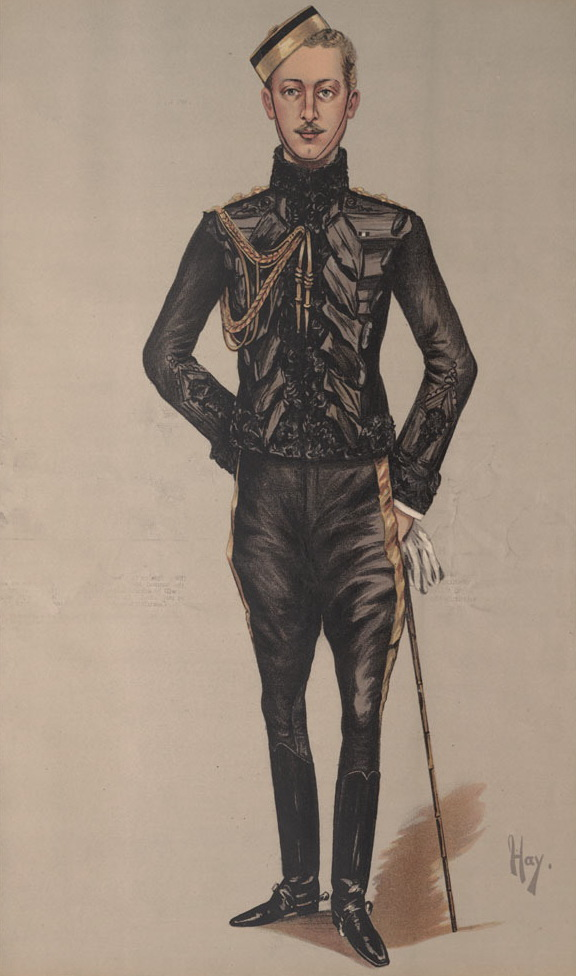
A caricature of Albert Victor published in Vanity Fair, 1888

During his life, the British press treated Albert Victor with respect, and the eulogies that followed his death were full of praise. The radical politician Henry Broadhurst, who had met both Albert Victor and his brother George, noted their "total absence of affectation or haughtiness". On the day of Albert Victor's death, the leading Liberal politician William Ewart Gladstone wrote in his private diary that it was "a great loss to our party". In private letters to her eldest daughter, Queen Victoria referred to Albert Victor's "dissipated life", comments that were later published.

In the mid-20th century, the official biographers of Queen Mary and King George V, James Pope-Hennessy and Harold Nicolson respectively, promoted hostile assessments of Albert Victor, portraying him as lazy, ill-educated, and physically feeble. The exact nature of his "dissipations" is unclear, but in 1994 Theo Aronson favoured the theory, based on "admittedly circumstantial" evidence, that the "unspecified 'dissipations' were predominantly homosexual". Aronson's judgement rested on Albert Victor's "adoration of his elegant and possessive mother; his 'want of manliness'; his 'shrinking from horseplay'; [and] his 'sweet, gentle, quiet and charming' nature", as well as the Cleveland Street rumours and Aronson's belief that there is "a certain amount of homosexuality in all men". He nevertheless admitted that "the allegations of Prince Eddy's homosexuality must be treated cautiously."

Rumours that Albert Victor may have committed, or been responsible for, the Jack the Ripper murders were first mentioned in print in 1962. It was later alleged, among others by Stephen Knight in Jack the Ripper: The Final Solution, that Albert Victor had fathered a child with a woman in Whitechapel and that he, or several high-ranking men, committed the murders to conceal the indiscretion. Although such claims have been frequently repeated, scholars have dismissed them as fantasies and point to indisputable evidence of Albert Victor's innocence. For example, on 30 September 1888, when Elizabeth Stride and Catherine Eddowes were murdered in London, Albert Victor was at Balmoral in Scotland. According to the official Court Circular, family journals and letters, newspaper reports, and other sources, he could not have been near any of the murders. Other conspiracy theories – that he died of syphilis or poison, that he was pushed off a cliff on the instructions of Lord Randolph Churchill, or that his death was faked to remove him from the line of succession – are similarly unfounded.

Albert Victor's posthumous reputation deteriorated to the point that in 1964 Philip Magnus described his death as a "merciful act of providence", arguing that it removed an unsuitable heir and replaced him with the reliable and sober George V. In 1972, Michael Harrison became the first modern author to reassess Albert Victor sympathetically. Biographer Andrew Cook continued this rehabilitation, arguing that Albert Victor's lack of academic progress was partly due to the incompetence of his tutor Dalton; that he was warm and charming; that there is no tangible evidence he was homosexual or bisexual; that he held liberal views, particularly on Irish Home Rule; and that his reputation was diminished by biographers eager to enhance the image of his brother George.

=== Fictional portrayals ===
The conspiracy theories surrounding Albert Victor have led to his portrayal in film as being involved in the Jack the Ripper murders. Bob Clark's Sherlock Holmes mystery Murder by Decree (1979) featured "Duke of Clarence (Eddy)" played by Robin Marchal. Jack the Ripper (1988) included Marc Culwick as Albert Victor. Samuel West played "Prince Eddy" in The Ripper (1997), having previously portrayed Albert Victor as a child in the 1975 TV miniseries Edward the Seventh. In that series, he was portrayed at older ages by Jerome Watts and Charles Dance.

From 1989 to 1998, Alan Moore and Eddie Campbell published the graphic novel From Hell in serialised form, based on Stephen Knight's theory. It was adapted into a 2001 film of the same name by the Hughes brothers, with Mark Dexter portraying both "Prince Edward" and "Albert Sickert". The story, drawing on many of the same sources as Murder by Decree, also inspired the play Force and Hypocrisy by Doug Lucie. Albert Victor also appears as a major but offstage character in The Flea (2023), based on the Cleveland Street scandal.

== Honours ==
British honours

- KG: Royal Knight Companion of the Most Noble Order of the Garter, 3 September 1883
- KP: Extra Knight of the Most Illustrious Order of Saint Patrick, 28 June 1887
- ADC: Personal Aide-de-Camp to the Queen, 21 June 1887
- LLD: Doctor of Laws, University of Dublin, 1887
- LLD: Doctor of Laws, University of Cambridge, 1888
- Sub-Prior of the Venerable Order of Saint John of Jerusalem, 1888

Foreign honours

- Grand Cross of the Order of the Netherlands Lion, 13 January 1885
- (Kingdom of Portugal) Grand Cross of the Royal Military Order of the Tower and Sword, 5 March 1885
- (Restoration (Spain)) Grand Cross of the Royal and Distinguished Order of Charles III, with Collar, 23 January 1885
- (Ottoman Empire) Order of Osmanieh, 1st Class in Diamonds
- (Kingdom of Romania) Grand Cross of the Order of the Star of Romania
- (Kingdom of Italy) Knight of the Supreme Order of the Most Holy Annunciation, 8 January 1885
- (Empire of Brazil) Grand Cross of the Order of the Southern Cross
- (Saxe-Coburg and Gotha) (Duchy of Saxe-Altenburg) (Saxe-Meiningen) Grand Cross of the Saxe-Ernestine House Order, 1883
- (Grand Duchy of Hesse) Grand Cross of the Grand Ducal Hessian Order of Ludwig, 30 April 1884
- (Saxe-Weimar-Eisenach) Grand Cross of the Order of the White Falcon, 1885
- (Denmark) Knight of the Order of the Elephant, 11 October 1883
- (Sweden) (Norway) Knight of the Royal Order of the Seraphim, 8 January 1885
- Knight of the Order of the Black Eagle, 8 January 1885
- (Belgium) Grand Cordon of the Order of Leopold, 1885
- (Austrian Empire) (Kingdom of Hungary) Grand Cross of the Royal Hungarian Order of Saint Stephen, 1887

=== Military ===
Albert Victor's coat of arms

- 1877–1879: Cadet aboard training ship HMS Britannia, Dartmouth, Devon
- 1879–1880: Cadet, HMS Bacchante
- Mid, 1880–1883: Promoted to midshipman, HMS Bacchante
- Lt, 1886–1887: Appointed Lieutenant, 10th (Prince of Wales' Own) Royal Hussars
- Capt, 1887: Promoted to captain, 9th Queen's Royal Lancers
- Capt, 1887–1889: Captain, 3rd King's Royal Rifle Corps
- Maj, 1889–1892: Major, 10th (Prince of Wales' Own) Royal Hussars

=== Honorary military appointments ===
- Honorary Sub-Lieutenant, Royal Naval Reserve, 8 January 1883
- (British Raj) Honorary Colonel, 4th Regiment, Bengal Infantry
- (British Raj) Honorary Colonel, 4th Bombay Cavalry
- (British Raj) Honorary Colonel, 1st Punjab Cavalry
- Honorary Colonel, Third City of London Rifle Volunteer Corps (7th (City of London) Battalion, London Regiment) 1890–92

=== Arms ===
With his dukedom, Albert Victor was granted a coat of arms, being the royal arms of the United Kingdom, differenced by an inescutcheon of the arms of Saxony and a label of three points argent, the centre point bearing a cross gules.

== Ancestry ==
Ancestors of Prince Albert Victor, Duke of Clarence and Avondale

8. Ernest I of Saxe-Coburg and Gotha
4. Prince Albert of Saxe-Coburg and Gotha
9. Princess Louise of Saxe-Gotha-Altenburg
2. Edward VII, King of the United Kingdom
10. Prince Edward, Duke of Kent and Strathearn
5. Queen Victoria of the United Kingdom
11. Princess Victoria of Saxe-Coburg-Saalfeld
1. Prince Albert Victor, Duke of Clarence and Avondale
12. Frederick William, Duke of Schleswig-Holstein-Sonderburg-Glücksburg
6. Christian IX, King of Denmark
13. Princess Louise Caroline of Hesse-Kassel
3. Princess Alexandra of Denmark
14. Prince William of Hesse-Kassel
7. Princess Louise of Hesse-Kassel
15. Princess Charlotte of Denmark
