= Jeff Underhill (writer) =

Australian screenwriter, playwright and journalist

Jeffrey Winton Underhill (1927–10 May 1978) was an Australian writer and journalist. He worked in advertising before turning to writing.

== Career ==
He was a regular writer on the Friday night edition of In Melbourne Tonight hosted by Noel Ferrier, who wrote in his memoirs that Underhill "possessed one of the most original talents for script writing I have ever encountered and I was extraordinarily luck to have him on the team. He wrote the entire show - no small effort on a weekly basis."

== Select credits ==
- The Bunyip and the Satellite (1957) - stage musical - lyrics
- The Ballad of Angel's Alley (1958) – stage musical, first performed at the New Theatre, Melbourne in December 1958
- Night of the Ding-Dong (1961) - writer
- Alice in Wonderland (1962 film) - writer
- In Melbourne Tonight (1962) – writer
- The Noel Ferrier Show (1964) – TV writer
- A Small Wonder (1966) – TV play
- A Time for Love - "Noises in Another Room" (1972) - TV play

== Notes ==
- Ferrier, Noel (1985). The Memoirs of Noel Ferrier: There Goes Whatsisname. The MacMillan Company of Australia.
