= New Theatre, Sydney =

Theatre company Newtown, New South Wales, Australia

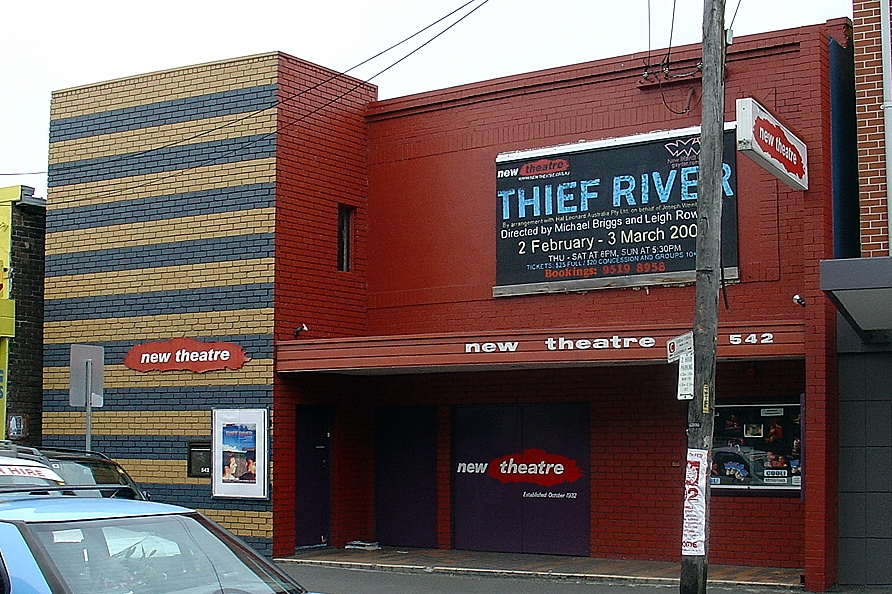
- The exterior of the New Theatre from King Street

- Location within inner Sydney
- Address: 542 King Street, Newtown, New South Wales, Australia
- Coordinates: 33.903139°S 151.179861°E

Construction
- Opened: 1932

Website
- newtheatre.org.au

The New Theatre, formerly Workers' Art Club and New Theatre League, is a community theatre company in the Inner West Sydney suburb of Newtown, New South Wales, Australia. Its origins are in the international New Theatre movement of the 1920s, and it is the oldest theatre company in continuous production in New South Wales.

== Background ==
New Theatre in Australia was inspired by similar movements abroad: the Workers' Theatre Movement in the 1920s in the UK, and the New Theatre League in the United States. They were all affiliated with the Communist Party, and the plays were in the agitprop style of theatre favoured by the Soviet Union. Themes usually related to the class struggle. Referred to as workers' theatre in the early days, groups subsequently formed in other cities around Australia, with Workers' Theatre Groups in Melbourne and Perth and similar groups in Brisbane, Newcastle, and Adelaide. Some disbanded and then got re-established, but only Sydney's New Theatre still exists (as of 2022).

Themes explored in the productions were mostly related to exploitation of the working class, sexism, racism in Australia, and against war. It has been estimated that the total number of plays produced by all of the New Theatres was over 400.

== History ==
The Workers' Art Club was established in July 1932, with George Finey as president. Its aims were reported as "to give the worker an opportunity of intellectual and cultural development free from financial embarrassment", presenting the arts in its diverse forms: "music, drawing, painting, literature, drama and craftsmanship, embracing practically every profession and trade in the community". It was then located at 273 Pitt Street, Sydney.

The first play presented by the Club in 1932 was Pygmalion. In November 1934, it staged a play called November, about the Russian Revolution, at premises at 36 Pitt Street.

In 1936, Workers' Art Club became the New Theatre League (NTL) analogous to the newly established New Theatre in Melbourne. Both theatres staged first Clifford Odets' play Waiting for Lefty, with the purpose of raising money for strikers, to great acclaim. With the rise of Nazism in Germany, then prepared to stage his play Till the Day I Die. After the German Consul General complained to the Commonwealth Government, the play was banned by Frank Chaffey, then Chief Secretary, but the theatre defied the ban and staged the play in private premises. Its slogan was then "Art is a weapon". When the play moved to Melbourne's New Theatre, it proved hugely popular and attracted new adherents to the theatre.

Prior to the war it staged performances with a pacifist message, but as it became inevitable, the theatre continued to stage performances through World War II, including taking performances to soldiers' camps. Its revue I'd Rather Be Left was a scathing attack on the "Phoney War", as it strived to make the war an anti-Fascist one.

It started being known simply as the New Theatre during the early 1950s. In the late 1950s, the theatre co-hosted the Mary Gilmore Award for the best new full-length play, along with the May Day Committees of Melbourne, Sydney and Newcastle.

=== Locations ===
As the Workers' Art Club and New Theatre League, performances were staged at 36 Pitt Street from 1932 to 1943.

From 1943 to 1953, the New Theatre League and then New Theatre had its home at 167 Castlereagh Street.

From 1954 to 1962, the New Theatre staged its productions at the Waterside Workers' Federation Hall in Sussex Street.

Rented premises at 8 St Peters Lane in Darlinghurst was the theatre's home from 1963 to 1973, when, after raising enough money to have its own theatre built, it moved to its current location at 542 King Street, Newtown.

== Today ==
The New Theatre in Sydney is the oldest theatre company in continuous production in New South Wales. As of 2022 it is located at 542 King Street, Newtown.

It relies on its performers, directors, designers, and crew working as volunteers.

== Productions ==
The following productions and performances have taken place in the past.

- 1953 – Reedy River
- 1983 – Falling Apart (directed by Brian Syron)
- 1989 – Windy Gully
- 1999 – Summer of the Aliens, Lots More Funny Business, The Removalists, Othello, A Midsummer Night's Dream, Poor Superman, Relative Comfort, A Cheery Soul
- 2000 – One Word We
- 2001 – Party Time Politics, Charles Dickens' Hard Times, Once in a While the Odd Thing Happens, The Man in the Moon is a Miss, The Club, The Diary of Anne Frank, Cries, Who's Afraid of the Working Class?, Search & Destroy, The Body Ophelia, Les Liaisons Dangereuses, Pandora's Garden (world premiere)
- 2002 – Lemon Delicious, Moved Reading of Six Pack, Fairy Tales of Oscar Wilde, Gross Indecency: The Three Trials of Oscar Wilde, Reedy River 2002, In Angel Gear, The Tempest, Abducting Diana, The Castle, Gabriel, Mad Before Midday, One-off moved Playreadings
- 2003 – Funny Money, Mother Clap's Molly House, Lemon Delicious, The Killing of Sister George, Silence, Dancing at Lughnasa, Assassins, Twelfth Night, African Gothic, Skylight, Blasted, A Room of One's Own, Woman in a Tree on a Hill, The Beauty Queen of Leenane, Zoo Story, The Dumb Waiter, The Plough and the Stars, Julius Caesar, Macbeth, Speed-the-Plow, Gary's House
- 2004 – A Christmas Carol, Into the Woods, Features of a Blown Youth, Navigating, Gagarin Way, La Musica and Savannah Bay, Going to St Ives, Danton's Death, War, Our Town, Richard III, Double Take: Shakespeare Scenework, Another Country, A Twist of Lemon Delicious, Falsettos, Hating Alison Ashley
- 2005 – Seven Little Australians, Falling Petals, The Wild Duck, Medea, Continental Drift (Lunch with Ludwig, The Girl on the Sofa, I Was In the House, Waiting for the Rain), The Woman in the Window, Manly Mates, Running up a Dress, The Winslow Boy, Thief River, The Titanic Orchestra, Pelléas and Mélisande, The Country, Black Sail White Sail
- 2006 – Thief River, Love Potions, Any Port in a Storm, The Titanic Orchestra, Aba Daba Honeymoon, A Beautiful Life, The Caucasian Chalk Circle, The Club, Journey's End, Not About Heroes, The Lady of the Camellias, Fencelines, The Voysey Inheritance, A Cultural Kebab, Laughter on the 23rd Floor, Shakin the Tree, Badjelly the Witch
- 2007 – You're Never too Old to Play!, Badjelly the Witch, Life After George, Talking to Terrorists, Oh What a Lovely War, Mate!, The Man from Mukinupin, Damages, After the End, Honeymoon Suite, Ghosts, Traitors, Art is a Weapon, New Theatre 75th Birthday Celebration, Howards End, Election Night (24 November), Morning Tide, Confusions
- 2008 – Angels in America –Part One: Millennium Approaches, The Real Inspector Hound, King Lear, Second Childhood, New Directions 2008: Catapult, Airsick, The Carnivores, Colder than Here, Kid's Club – Winter, Summer
- 2016 – The Cherry Orchard (26 April–28 May – David Mamet's adaptation, with an original musical score by Eliza Scott)
- 2017 – Dorothy Hewett's The Chapel Perilous (25 April–27 May)
- 2024 – Richard Foreman's SOPHIA=(WISDOM) Part 3: The Cliffs (10–27 January. Directed and designed by Patrick Kennedy)
- 2025 – Stags and Hens, The Flea, Fighting, In the Next Room, Dangerous Liaisons, Hir, The Frogs, The Laramie Project, Present Laughter
- 2026 – Perfect Arrangement, Stage Kiss, Dancing at Lughnasa, Continuity, The Day of the Triffids

== See also ==
- New Theatre, Melbourne
