= John Dale (doctor) =

English-born Australian medical practitioner (1885 – 1952)

John Dale OBE (27 May 1885 – 27 September 1952) was an English-born Australian medical practitioner.

He was born at Coleshill in Warwickshire to grocer James Francis Dale and Mary Grace. He was educated at Solihull Grammar School before studying medicine at the University of Birmingham. After a tour of Germany he worked as an assistant medical officer in Smethwick. He married Wynifred Mary Evans, a kindergarten teacher in the Montessori style, on 9 July 1914; they had four children. During World War I he served in the Royal Army Medical Corps as a major, and he was appointed deputy assistant director of medical services to the Second and Fourth Armies and the Army of the Rhine. He was recognised for his work combating typhoid fever with an OBE and a French decoration.

Shortly after the war Dale received his Doctorate of Medicine and migrated to Australia, arriving in Perth in February 1920 to become medical officer of health and assistant inspector of hospitals. He remained in Western Australia until 1927, when he was appointed medical officer of health for the City of Melbourne. From 1929 he also lectured at the University of Melbourne on public health, and he served on the British Medical Association's Victorian council (president 1945). In February 1951 he was divorced; on 7 March that year he married Dr Hilda Bull, after which he and his wife left for the Netherlands. Dale worked as a medical officer for the Australian government, examining potential migrants. On 27 September 1952 he was killed in a car accident at Venice. He is buried near Verona.
