= Jeff Underhill (politician) =

American politician

Member of the Kansas House of Representatives from the 65th district
- In office January 9, 2023 – January 13, 2025
- Preceded by: Lonnie Clark
- Succeeded by: Shawn Chauncey

Personal details
- Born: Fredonia, Kansas, U.S.
- Party: Republican
- Profession: Previously an Insurance Agent (license revoked by the State of Kansas)

Jeffrey Underhill Jr. is an American politician. He served as a Republican member for the 65th district in the Kansas House of Representatives from 2023 to 2025. He has also served as a city commissioner of Junction City.

Underhill would be defeated in a primary challenge by Shawn Chauncey.

== Biography ==
He grew up in rural Junction city and graduated from Junction City High School. Underhill was the owner of a company named Hometown Insurance Agency before his Insurance License was revoked by the State of Kansas. Was the Mayor of Junction City. He is also president of the Junction City Community Baseball Club. He also competes in Strongman competitions.
