= New Theatre League (New York City) =

Theatre organisation

New Theatre magazine, October 1936 issue

The New Theatre League was a group of theatre professionals working in New York City. A successor to the League of Workers' Theatres (of the U.S.A.), the New Theatre League existed between 1935 and 1942. It published New Theatre, which was renamed Theatre and Film and then New Theatre News.

== History ==
The New Theatre League had its genesis in the workers' theatre movement, whose umbrella organization was in the mid-1930s the League of Workers' Theatres (of U.S.A.).

The New Theatre League was a left-wing federation of little theatres and amateur theatrical groups, whose productions were aimed at addressing political issues of the day. It ran the New Theatre School and Theatre Workshop, a training school that used the Stanislavsky Method for educating actors, theatre directors, playwrights, and stage managers.

New Theatre League productions included Irwin Shaw's Bury the Dead and Marc Blitzstein's The Cradle Will Rock.

== Artists ==
Theatre professionals who worked with the League included:

- Leonard Bernstein
- Bertolt Brecht
- Clifford Odets
- Albert Maltz
- John Garfield
- Lee Strasberg
- Paul and Claire Sifton

== Publications ==
Workers Theatre had been published irregularly since April 1931, originally by the International Workers Dramatic Union and the League of Workers Theatres of the US, until around 1933.

Its history is complicated, but New Theatre began in 1934, was then published by the New Theatre League. It was renamed Theatre and Film to reflect a broadened focus, effective with the start of volume 4 in March 1937. Sometime before November 1939 it became New Theatre News. New Theatre was also the official organ of the Workers Dance League and Workers Film and Photo League for at least some of its life.
