= Owen Weingott =

Australian director & actor

- Actor Owen Weingott during his military service
- Born: Owen Ash Weingott; 21 June 1921; Sydney, Australia
- Died: 12 October 2002 (aged 81)
- Education: Sydney Boys High School (1939); Sydney University; Independent Theatre
- Occupations: Actor; director; voice over; drama teacher
- Years active: 1941, 1945–2001 (as actor)
- Organisation: Vice President of Actors Equity of Australia
- Known for: The Private World of Miss Prim; Autumn Affair; Home and Away
- Spouse: Violet Margaret 'Peggy' Dent (m. 1942; d. 2002)
- Children: 2
- Parent(s): Abraham Weingott (father); Zara Hannah Davis (mother)

Owen Ash Weingott (21 June 1921 – 12 October 2002) was a Jewish-Australian actor, director, voice artist and drama teacher. Although primarily working in theatre, he appeared on radio and television in serials, television plays and voiceovers, over a career spanning some 60 years.

Weingott starred in Australia's first soap opera Autumn Affair, and is well known for his brief role as former school principal Walter Bertram, in the first season of Home and Away.

== Early life and education ==
Weingott was born in 1921, in the Sydney suburb of Mosman, New South Wales, to factory manager Abraham Weingott and his wife Zara Hannah (nee Davis). He was their only son and their first child. When Weingott was two, his mother died in childbirth, leaving him to be raised by his paternal grandmother, several aunts, and his great-aunt, Debbie Lewis. From age five, Weingott wanted to be an actor. He began performing in school productions and became interested in Shakespeare.

On 23 June 1934, at the age of 13, Weingott had his Bar Mitzvah at The Great Synagogue in Sydney.

When he was 15, Weingott began studying and performing in amateur theatre productions at the Independent Theatre, under producer Doris Fitton, and later at the Savoy Theatre, with plays including 1066 and All That, Six Characters in Search of an Author and Judgement Day.

After finishing at Sydney Boys High School in 1939, Weingott studied economics at University of Sydney.

== Career ==
=== Theatre ===
Weingott made his professional debut in theatre when he was given a role in the Insect Play at the Independent in 1941. In 1942, however his studies and career was put on hold, when he enrolled in the Royal Australian Air Force (RAAF).

Having achieved the rank of corporal, Weingott was discharged from the Air Force at the end of the war, in December 1945. He returned to Australia from Canada, where he had been instructing in aircraft identification. He then studied for a year at the Sydney Law School, before ultimately returning to the stage. From 1945, he also trained in fencing under Frank Stuart at the Sydney Swords Club, where he was promoted to senior instructor and fight choreographer.

Weingott returned to the Independent Theatre, performing as Young Siward in a 1945 production of Macbeth. The following year, Doris Fitton produced Hamlet and cast Weingott as Laertes (who duels with Hamlet), a role he went on to play five times, one being a live broadcast from the ABC-TV studios. He went on to choreograph and act in over 400 duels during the span of his career on stage, film and television.

Weingott was known for his Shakespearean roles. In 1951 he played Cornwall in John Alden's King Lear at St. James Hall. That same year, he played Mephistopheles in Goethe's Faust at the Independent Theatre. He then joined Alden's national tour of a Shakespearian play season from 1951 to 1952, playing Edgar in King Lear, Demetrius in A Midsummer Night's Dream, Antigonus in The Winter's Tale, and the Prince of Morocco, Tubal and Bassanio in The Merchant of Venice.

On his return, Weingott approached Sydney John Kay for a position in his Mercury Theatre, where he played Papa in Samuel Taylor's The Happy Time in 1953. Other plays for the Mercury during this time included Happily Ever After, As You Like It, Ring Round the Moon, Charley's Aunt and Tovarich.

In 1957 at the Independent Theatre, Weingott played the co-lead alongside Peter O'Shaughnessy in Brigid Boland's The Prisoner, produced Leonard Teale as Macbeth and played the Inquisitor in Jean Anouilh's The Lark. He also played the lead role of Eddie Carbone in Arthur Miller's A View from the Bridge in 1959.

Throughout the 1960s, Weingott performed with the Old Tote Theatre, in plays including The Playboy of the Western World, The Caucasian Chalk Circle and The School Mistress. He also notably portrayed Lophkin in their 1963 production of The Cherry Orchard.

Weingott worked with Ray Milland in a 1967 staging of the play Hostile Witness and played the lead role of Victor in Arthur Miller's The Price in 1970 at The Independent. He also played Sinbad the Sailor in a 1972 pantomime directed by Bill Orr, before going on to appear with Michael Redgrave in John Mortimer's play A Voyage Round My Father in 1973.

In 1974, Weingott was invited to the Mitchell College of Advanced Education in Bathurst, to direct King Lear and to play the lead.

=== Television ===
From 1958, Weingott began starring as Larry Muir, alongside Muriel Steinbeck in Autumn Affair, Australia's first soap opera, about the life of a middle-aged widowed author and her romantic relationships. He went on to feature in numerous TV plays including a lead role in Act of Violence in 1959. That same year, he portrayed Laertes in its first live-to-air production of Hamlet. Other TV plays include The Square Ring (1960) in which he played Rick Martell, The Scent of Fear (1960), The Merchant of Venice (1961) as Shylock and The Tempest (1963) as Caliban.

Weingott played William Allen in 1963 period drama miniseries The Hungry Ones, opposite Leonard Teale. He then appeared as Professor Mayer from 1964 to 1965 in nine episodes of The Stranger. He had a starring role in sitcom The Private World of Miss Prim in 1966, playing author and RAF pilot, Tony Kendall.

In 1970, Weingott played the recurring role of villain Platonus in sci-fi series Phoenix Five and landed the regular part of Jewish financier Jacob Goldberg in media empire series Dynasty. He voiced the character of Lord Maze in an animated series of Around the World in Eighty Days in 1972. Then in 1974, he took on the role of Phillip Bailey-Smith in Crawford's soap opera The Box.

Weingott had regular guest roles in Homicide, Hunter and Consider Your Verdict. Other guest credits included Whiplash (1960; 1961), Jonah (1962), Adventure Unlimited (1965), Boney (1972), Number 96 (1972), Spyforce (1973) and Ryan (1973; 1974).

After taking a hiatus to concentrate on teaching, Weingott returned to acting in 1985. He had guest roles in Rafferty's Rules (1987; 1990), medical drama The Flying Doctors, anthology series More Winners (both 1990), and later, police procedural series Water Rats (2001). He also played school principal Walter Bertram in long-running soap opera Home and Away, during its first season in 1988.

=== Film ===
Weingott appeared in 1954 pirate adventure film Long John Silver, in which he also staged the world's first mass duel in Cinemascope, choreographing 32 pairs of fighters.

Weingott had roles in several other films, including 1971 action drama film That Lady from Peking, in which he played Barina. In 1974, he played Adler in cult biker film Stone, alongside Hugh Keays-Byrne and Ken Shorter. He also voiced roles in several animated TV movies including Robinson Crusoe (1972) The Black Arrow (1973) and The Gentlemen of Titipu (1974). He later appeared in 1989 historical adventure drama film Wrangler.

=== Radio ===
Weingott's first radio work was in 1945 in The Scarlet Widow, a serial for 2CH. From 1950, he took on a leading role as Walter Manning in radio soap opera Portia Faces Life. He had multiple roles in radio serial The Adventures of Ellery Queen from 1954 to 1955. He featured in an ongoing capacity in the series The Clock from 1955 to 1966 and Radio Cab, around 1958. He also performed in many Shakespeare plays for ABC Radio.

=== Other ===
Weingott was a coach for the first Australian Olympic fencing team, which competed in the 1952 Helsinki Olympic Games. He was also a senior instructor in fencing at University of Sydney.

Weingott was a foundation lecturer at Sydney's National Institute of Dramatic Art. After directing and appearing in a 1974 production of King Lear at the Mitchell College of Advanced Education in Bathurst, Weingott returned in 1976 as a lecturer in Theatre Arts, remaining for ten years, before returning to Sydney in 1986.

Weingott was vice-president of the Australian actors union, Actors Equity of Australia.

== Personal life and death ==
Weingott met his wife Violet Margaret 'Peggy' Dent working at department store, David Jones. They married in October 1942. Together they had two children, Paul (b. 1947) and Robyn (b. 1954). His son Paul became an actor, best known for playing Bruce Taylor, the first lover of Don Finlayson (Joe Hasham) in soap opera Number 96.

For the final two years of his life, Weingott was primary carer for his wife, until he was diagnosed with terminal cancer in June 2002. He died in October 2002, aged 81, and was survived by his wife, two children and three grandchildren.

== Filmography ==
=== Film ===
Year	Title	Role	Notes	Ref
1954	Long John Silver (aka Long John Silver's Return to Treasure Island)		Feature film	
1957	One for the Road		Short film	
1970	Adam's Woman		Feature film	
1971	That Lady from Peking	Barina	Feature film	
1974	Stone	Adler	Feature film	
1988	Classic Adventure Stories: Robinson Crusoe	Voice	Animated feature film	
1989	Wrangler (aka Minnamurra or Outback)	General Smith	Feature film	

=== Television ===
Year	Title	Role	Notes	Ref
1956	The Valiant		TV movie	
1957	In the Zone	Smitty	TV movie	
1957	The Adventures of Long John Silver	Sean O'Flaherty	1 episode	
1958	Killer in Close-Up	Emile L'Angelier	Episode: "The Trial of Madeleine Smith"	
1958	His Excellency		TV movie	
1958–1959	Autumn Affair	Larry Muir	156 episodes, regular role	
1959	Act of Violence	Alexander	TV play	
1959	Hamlet	Hamlet	TV play	
1959	Sixty Point Bold		TV play	
1960	The Square Ring	Rick Martell	TV play	
1960	Stormy Petrel	Captain Short	Miniseries, 1 episode	
1960	The Scent of Fear	Bureaucrat	TV play	
1960	The Life and Death of King Richard II	Sir Pierce of Exton	TV play	
1960; 1961	Whiplash	Bill Fry / Smithy	2 episodes	
1961	A Little South of Heaven	Primo	TV play	
1961	The Merchant of Venice	Shylock	TV play	
1961	Harlequinade	Fred Ingram	TV play	
1962	Jonah	Pockton	Episode 1: "No Time for Despair"	
1962	My Three Angels	Henri	TV play	
1962; 1963	Consider Your Verdict	Lionel Varner / Robert Lanyon	2 episodes	
1963	The Tempest	Caliban	TV play	
1963	Don't Listen Ladies	Michel	TV play	
1963	The Hungry Ones	William Allen		
1964	Tribunal	Dick Turpin	1 episode	
1964–1965	The Stranger	Professor Mayer	9 episodes	
1965	Adventure Unlimited	Det Sgt Hamilton	Episode: "The Witness"	
1965–1976	Homicide	Johnny Patric / Arthur Freeman / Rev Alan Ward / William 'Drummy' Taylor / Eric Steele / Russell Green / Jeff Randall / Rex Wilton / George Lister	9 episodes	
1966	The Private World of Miss Prim	Tony Kendall	11 episodes	
1967	The Schoolmistress	Admiral Ranking	TV play	
1967; 1968	Hunter	Pat Gallagher / Silverman / Doctor Dressler	3 episodes	
1969	Good Morning Mr Doubleday		1 episode	
1969	Riptide	Inspector Tom Metcalfe	1 episode	
1969	Silo 15	Captain Thomson	TV play	
1969–1974	Division 4	The Tribunal / Geoff Hughes / Sydney / Gordon Lee	4 episodes	
1970	The Link Men	Josef Vogelsang	1 episode	
1970	The Rovers	Jim Fraser	1 episode	
1970	The Long Arm	Dr Scarlo	1 episode	
1970	Delta	McCrainor	1 episode	
1970	Barrier Reef	De Veuss	1 episode	
1970	Phoenix Five	Platonus	10 episodes	
1970–1971	Dynasty	Jacob Goldberg	22 episodes	
1971–1974	Matlock Police	Pike / John Bates / Len Jackson / Inspector Roach	4 episodes	
1972	Number 96	Victor Cameron	1 episode	
1972	Boney	Bill Newton	Episode 10: "Boney and the Monster"	
1972	Around the World in Eighty Days	Lord Maze (voice)	Animated series, 2 episodes	
1972	Robinson Crusoe	Voice	Animated TV movie	
1972	The Spoiler	Dr Ross	1 episode	
1973	Spyforce	Pastor Simons	1 episode	
1973	The Black Arrow	Voice	Animated TV movie	
1973; 1974	Ryan	Anton / Bannerman / Inspector Gray	3 episodes	
1974	The Gentlemen of Titipu	Voice	Animated TV movie	
1974	The Evil Touch	Sergeant Parker	Episode: "Death by Dreaming"	
1974	The Box	Phillip Bailey-Smith	39 episodes	
1987; 1990	Rafferty’s Rules	Samuel Spink / Karl Becker	2 episodes	
1988	Olive	Vincent	TV movie	
1988	The Alien Years	Edmund Barton	Miniseries	
1988	Home and Away	Mr. Walter Bertram	12 episodes	
1990	The Flying Doctors	Jannis Goannides	1 episode	
1990	More Winners	Justus Zuckerman	1 episode	
1992	Bony	Helmut	1 episode	
2001	Water Rats	Arthur Marx	1 episode	

== Theatre ==
=== As actor ===
Year	Title	Role	Notes	Ref
1941	The Life of the Insects		Independent Theatre, Sydney	
	1066 and All That		Independent Theatre, Sydney	
	Six Characters in Search of an Author		Independent Theatre, Sydney	
	Judgement Day		Independent Theatre, Sydney	
1945	Macbeth	Young Siward	Independent Theatre, Sydney	
1945	Hamlet	Laertes	Independent Theatre, Sydney	
1945–1946	Mourning Becomes Electra		Independent Theatre, Sydney, Comedy Theatre, Melbourne with J. C. Williamson's	
1946	Mary Stuart		Independent Theatre, Sydney	
1949	Romeo and Juliet		Metropolitan Theatre, Sydney	
1949	Shipwreck	David Seevansk	Metropolitan Theatre, Sydney	
1950	She Stoops to Conquer	Hardcastle / Hastings	Metropolitan Theatre, Sydney	
1950	The Chinese Lantern		Metropolitan Theatre, Sydney	
1951	Faust	Mephistopheles	Independent Theatre, Sydney	
1951	An Angel Came		Theatre Royal Sydney with J. C. Williamson's	
1951	Misalliance		St James' Hall, Sydney with John Alden Company	
1951	A Victorian Marriage		St James Hall, Sydney with John Alden Company	
1951–1952	King Lear	Cornwall / Edgar / Bassanfo	John Alden Company national tour	
1951–1952	A Midsummer Night's Dream	Demetrius	Theatre Royal, Adelaide, Comedy Theatre, Melbourne with John Alden Company	
1952	The Merchant of Venice	Prince of Morocco / Tubal / Bassanio	John Alden Company national tour	
1952	The Merry Wives of Windsor		John Alden Company national tour	
1952	The Winter's Tale	Antigonus	His Majesty's Theatre, Perth with John Alden	
1952	Happily Ever After		St James' Hall, Sydney with Mercury Theatre	
1953	For Better, for Worse		Theatre Royal Sydney with J. C. Williamson's	
1953	The Happy Time	Papa	St James' Hall, Sydney with Mercury Theatre, Sydney	
1953	Tovarich	Prince Mikail Alexandrovitch Ouratieff	Mercury Theatre, Sydney	
1953	Ring Round the Moon		St James' Hall, Sydney with Mercury Theatre	
1953	Charley's Aunt		St James' Hall, Sydney with Mercury Theatre	
1953	As You Like It	Jacques	St James' Hall, Sydney with Mercury Theatre	
1953	A Midsummer Night's Dream	Oberon	Woollahra Plavhouse, Sydney	
1955	Hamlet		Phillip St Theatre, Sydney	
1955	The Duenna		Phillip St Theatre, Sydney	
1956	The Bishop's Wife		Adyar Hall, Sydney	
1956	Naked Possum		Independent Theatre, Sydney	
1956	Waters of the Moon	Winterhalter	Independent Theatre, Sydney	
1957	The Willow Pattern Plate	Ta Jin	Phillip St Theatre, Sydney	
1957	The Prisoner	Interrogator	Independent Theatre, Sydney	
1957	The Lark	The Inquisitor	Independent Theatre, Sydney	
1958	Curly on the Rack	Tim	Elizabethan Theatre, Sydney	
1959	A View from the Bridge	Eddie Carbone	Independent Theatre, Sydney	
1963	The Cherry Orchard	Lophkin	UNSW Old Tote Theatre, Sydney	
1963	The Playboy of the Western World		UNSW Old Tote Theatre, Sydney	
1963	Rashomon	Tajomaru		
1964	Heartbreak House		UNSW Old Tote Theatre, Sydney	
1964	The Caucasian Chalk Circle		UNSW Old Tote Theatre, Sydney	
1964	King Henry V	Duke of Exeter	Tent Theatre, Adelaide, Tent Theatre, Sydney	
1965	The Marriage of Mr Mississippi		Independent Theatre, Sydney	
1965	The Business of Good Government		Assembly Hall, Sydney with Q Theatre Co	
1966	Burning Bright		Ensemble Theatre, Sydney	
1967	The Schoolmistress		UNSW Old Tote Theatre, Sydney	
1967	Hostile Witness	Charles Milburn	Tivoli Theatre, Sydney, Princess Theatre, Melbourne	
1968	King Lear		UNSW, Sydney	
1968	The Lotos-Eaters	Jack Power	Arts Theatre, Adelaide	
1969	In the Matter of J. Robert Oppenheimer		Ensemble Theatre, Sydney	
1970	Murder in the Cathedral		Independent Theatre, Sydney	
1970	The Price	Victor Franz	Independent Theatre, Sydney	
1971	Come Live With Me	Milton Rademacher	Phillip Theatre, Sydney	
1971	The Night Thoreau Spent in Jail	Waldo	Ensemble Theatre, Sydney	
1972	Sinbad the Sailor	Sinbad	Richbrooke Theatre, Sydney	
1973	A Voyage Round My Father	Headmaster	Comedy Theatre, Melbourne, UNSW, Sydney with J. C. Williamson's	
1974	King Lear	King Lear	Mitchell College of Advanced Education, Bathurst	
1977	The Business of Good Government		Assembly Hall, Sydney with Q Theatre Co	
1985	Hamlet	Ghost		
1987	The Levine Comedy		Ensemble Theatre, Sydney	
1988	Come Blow Your Horn		Bondi Pavilion, Sydney	
1993	The Road to Mecca	Marious Byleveld	Lookout Theatre, Sydney	
1997	Shakespeare's sonnets		Bowral Shakespeare Festival	
1997	Whitlam on Parer	Damien Parer (voice)	State Library of NSW	
	Dracula		Elizabethan Theatre, Sydney	
	Night Must Fall			

=== As crew ===
Year	Title	Role	Notes	Ref
1953	The Proposal	Director	St James' Hall, Sydney with Mercury Theatre	
1957	Macbeth	Producer	Independent Theatre, Sydney	
1957	The Same Sky	Producer	Phoenix Theatre, Sydney	
1967	Tevye and His Daughters	Producer	MLC Hall, Sydney with Viennese Theatre	
1968	The Recruiting Officer	Supervisor	University of Adelaide	
1969	Hamlet	Fight Director	Theatre Royal, Hobart with Old Tote Theatre Company	
1972	Twelfth Night	Fight Director	SGIO Theatre, Brisbane with QTC	
1973	'Tis Pity She's a Whore	Fight Director / Fight Choreographer	UNSW Old Tote Theatre, Sydney	
1974	King Lear	Director	Mitchell College of Advanced Education, Bathurst	
1985	Hamlet	Fight Choreographer		
1988	Come Blow Your Horn	Director	Bondi Pavilion, Sydney	
1994	Same Difference	Director	Bondi Pavilion, Sydney	
1998	Life Goes On	Director	North Shore Temple Emanuel, Sydney	

== Radio (partial) ==
Year	Title	Role	Notes	Ref
1945	The Scarlet Widow		2CH	
1946	You Can't Take It With You	Pier		
1950	Portia Faces Life	Walter Manning	3UZ	
1950s	Pepper Young’s Family	Mr Samuel Young	2UE	
1950s	Stranger in Paradise	Joe Rocca	2UE	
1954	Night of Atonement	Harry	2UE	
1954	The Adventures of Ellery Queen	Nigel	Episode 2: "The Man Who Was Afraid"	
1954	The Adventures of Ellery Queen	Merritt	Episode 14: "The Needle Hole Mystery"	
1954	The Adventures of Ellery Queen	Buffon	Episode 19: "Nikki Porter, Suspect"	
1954	The Adventures of Ellery Queen	Biggy	Episode 22: "The Specialist in Cops"	
1955	The Adventures of Ellery Queen	Wadsworth	Episode 33: "The Lost Card"	
1955	The Adventures of Ellery Queen	Billings / Fornacci	Episode 35: "Man without a Heart"	
1955	The Adventures of Ellery Queen	Doctor	Episode 40: "The Old Man's Darling"	
1955	The Adventures of Ellery Queen	Benvenuto	Episode 41: "The Kid Glove Killer"	
1955	The Adventures of Ellery Queen	Pucci	Episode 51: "Cokey and the Pizza"	
1955	Fallen Angel		2UW	
1955	The Clock	Detective	Episode 13: "The Other Woman"	
1956	The Clock	Leach	Episode 15: "The Hitchhiker"	
1956	The Clock	Burr	Episode 21: "The Past or the Present"	
1956	The Clock	Beach	Episode 26: "Guilty as Always"	
1956	The Clock	Miguel	Episode 39: "The Matador"	
1956	The Clock	Leo	Episode 45: "Mr Jekyll and Hyde"	
1956	The Clock	Barkeep	Episode 47: "Hazel"	
1956	The Clock	Nicky	Episode 50: "The Sweet Cheat"	
1956	The Knave of Hearts	Carlo		
1956–1959	The Reverend Matthew	Dr Isaacs		
c.1958	Radio Cab			
1962	Sara Dane	Harry Turner		
c.1972	My Father's House			
	The Man in the Mist			
	Hercule Poirot			
