= St James' Hall, Sydney =

Theatre in Sydney, Australia

General information
- Location: Phillip Street, Sydney
- Coordinates: 33°52′08″S 151°12′39″E

St James' Hall, sometimes written as St James's Hall, was a building which stood at 171 Phillip Street, Sydney, near King Street. It figured prominently in the history of small theatre in Australia. Owned by, and on the same parcel of land as St James' Church of England, it was close to tram and bus services and the St James railway station.

== History ==
St James' Hall with its location and modest size and rent, it was the venue of choice for concerts and recitals by the likes of James Brunton Gibb, Ethel Lang, Lindley Evans, Idwal Jenkins and Wilfrid Thomas.

In 1950, the Workers' Educational Association was offered lease of the hall and the State government agreed to increase the organisation's subsidy by £A770pa. But it was rather dilapidated and needed around £A7000 spent on refitting and refurbishment. £4000 of this was to be raised from its members for provision of offices, lecture rooms and a bookshop and £A3000 to fit out the theatre (mostly for seats and lighting) and to be raised from the theatre-going public. An appeal was instigated with assistance of the Sydney Morning Herald. After delays which forced the postponement of the first major function, a play by Sydney University Dramatic Society opened on 15 July. The WEA moved its headquarters from Albert Street late in September.

It held 300 seats with a narrow (just three deep) gallery around three walls. Before 1940 it was mostly used by amateur dramatic societies, but also for public meetings, symposia, receptions, competitions, examinations and public lectures.

The Sydney Players Club (interchangeably called "Players Club") was the chief user of the hall between 1931 and 1948. The oldest of Sydney's "little theatres", it was founded by W. F. Jackson, S. R. Irving, Winchester Ford and other members of Gregan McMahon's Sydney Repertory Theatre after that group disbanded. Alice Gould was its secretary for many years.

The John Alden Company played Shakespeare (and other dramas) there in 1950 and 1951.

== Mercury Theatre ==
Theatre entrepreneur Sydney John Kay took over the lease in February 1952, re-naming it the Mercury Theatre for his (professional) troupe, Mercury Theatres Pty Ltd which was founded by himself and actor Peter Finch in 1946 and named after Orson Welles Mercury Theatre. performers at the theatre included such notables as Alexander Archdale, Rod Taylor and Lyndall Barbour. He moved his company from Killara with the intention of presenting three plays in rotation six nights a week, but despite his actors accepting lower fees than they could earn in radio, in three years his losses proved unsupportable.

== Phillip Street Theatre ==
The last tenant was William Orr's Phillip Street Theatre (previously Playgoers' Cooperative) from May 1954. His programme of topical revues proved popular and brought to public attention actors and writers who would go on to success on television. When the hall was demolished in 1961 the company moved to the Australian Hall at 150 Elizabeth St, renaming itself the "Phillip Theatre". Names associated with this era include Bud Tingwell, Margo Lee, Gordon Chater, Max Oldaker. Imported stars included Joyce Grenfell.

In 1961, the Church (which still owned the building) had it demolished to make way for a 13-storey office block. It included a small theatre with more modern and comfortable facilities with a commensurate increase in rent.

== Selected productions ==
Note: This list is incomplete and only dramatic productions are listed. Most are opening nights with no indication of successive performances if any.

- 21 Oct 1887 Midsummer Nights Dream Sydney University Union
- 11 Feb 1904 dramatic recitations by Lawrence Campbell
- 3 Jun 1904 comedies Players’ Club (dir. Phillip Lytton)
- 9 Aug 1904 Chalk and Cheese The Pierrot Entertainers
- 17 Jul 1909 Barbara/Shades of Night Mrs Albert Littlejohn et al. (dir. S. R. Innes-Noad)
- 6 Jun 1914 Dearest Mamma Grace Stafford Strollers
- 19 Mar 1914 The Strike Walter Bentley Players (Walter Bentley)
- 25 Mar 1916 Dramatic recitals by Ancelon-Chapman Company (Douglas Ancelon, Stella Chapman)
- 21 Oct 1916 Penelope Grace Stafford Strollers
- 19 Dec 1918 Dot and the Kangaroo Grace Stafford Strollers
- 22 Oct 1919 Jane Harrison Allen
- 30 Jun 1924 The Rotters Lawrence Campbell
- 25 Nov 1926 To Have the Honour Players Club (Francis Jackson)
- 21 Aug 1928 The Man from Toronto Andrew MacCunn School of Stage Singing and Dramatic Art (H. W. Varna)
- 22 Sep 1928 The School for Scandal Players Club (Heath Burdock)
- 11 Oct 1928 The Young Person in Pink Dorothy Free Comedy Company
- 13 Jun 1929 Scrapped Players Club (S. R. Irving)
- 14 Nov 1929 Glenfield (variety) Hazel Boss, Lottie.
- 9 Apr 1930 Fundraising revue by Australian Women's Hockey Team
- 6 Aug 1930 By Candlelight The Independent Theatre (their debut - dir. Harry Tighe)
- 22 Aug 1930 The Young Person in Pink Girl Guides Dramatic Society
- 8 Oct 1930 The Marquise The Independent Theatre (Doris Fitton)
- 21 Oct 1930 Turn To the Right Austral Players (Harold Fraser)
- 1 Nov 1930 The Last Enemy Players Club (S. R. Irving)
- 5 Nov 1930 The Queen Was in the Parlour The Independent Theatre (Doris Fitton)
- 8 Apr 1931 The Traitors Players Club
- 26 Dec 1931 On the Doorstep Sydney Repertory Theatre
- 20 Jun 1931 That Young Person in Pink (Grace Stafford)
- 15 Apr 1932 Art and Mrs Bottle Players Club (Raoul Cardamatis)
- 16 Jul 1932 The Kingdom of God Sydney Repertory Theatre
- 12 Nov 1932 The Rivals Players Club (John Appleton)
- 11 Apr 1933 Dona Clarines Players Club
- 2 May 1933 Mary’s Other Husband Postal Institute Dramatic Society
- 1 Jul 1933 A Social Convenience Players Club (S. R. Irving)
- 22 Jul 1933 Tobias and the Angel Players Club
- 9 Oct 1933 Pandora Lifts the Lid Bellevue Hill Histrions (H W Varna)
- 17 Feb 1934 The Father (Strindberg) (Montgomery Stuart)
- 5 May 1934 The Roundabout Players Club (S. R. Irving)
- 19 May 1934 Knuts in May Public Services Music & Dramatic Socy
- 16 Jun 1934 The Mocking Bird Players Club (Cedric Kempson)
- 29 Sep 1934 Dr Knock Players Club (J. Appleton)
- 10 Nov 1934 Jonah and the Whale Players Club (J. Appleton)
- 22 Dec 1934 Everyman of Everystreet Players Club (J. Appleton)
- 16 Mar 1935 Intruders Players Club (Horace J. Salier)
- 18 Apr 1935 Libel Players Club (J. Appleton)
- 24 Apr 1935 Again Mere Man (revue) St James’ Joy Boys (Eric Howell)
- 22 Jun 1935 Peace and Quiet Players Club (J. Appleton)
- 21 Sep 1935 Red Sky at Night Players Club (J. Appleton)
- 9 Nov 1935 Putting It Over Clara Thespian Dramatic Prod. (Alan Stone)
- 16 Nov 1935 Dragons Teeth Players Club (J. Appleton)
- 21 Nov 1935 Miranda Studio Theatre Players (A. C. Gordon Forsythe)
- 29 Feb 1936 Hawk Island The Thespians (Muriel Conner)
- 14 Mar 1936 Haunted Houses Players Club (J. Appleton)
- 2 May 1936 The Maitlands Players Club (J. Appleton)
- 30 Mar 1936 To Have the Honour Thespian Dramatic Prod. (Muriel Conner)
- 10 Jun 1936 Indiscretion Dajonian Repertory Society
- 20 Jun 1936 Cock Robin Players Club (Cedric Kempson)
- 18 Jul 1936 Family Affairs Thespian Dramatic Prod. (Muriel Conner)
- 22 Jul 1936 Nine Til Six Little Theatre Club
- 8 Aug 1936 April in August Thespian Dramatic Prod. (Alan Stone)
- 15 Aug 1936 The Path of Glory Players Club (Frank Appleton)
- 24 Aug 1936 Short Story Little Theatre Club
- 20 Nov 1936 Dangerous Corner Brunton Gibb Players (James Brunton Gibb)
- 12 Feb 1937 This Thing Called Love Vogue Theatre (Ina Allan)
- 20 Feb 1937 Avalanche Dajonian Repertory Society
- 13 Apr 1937 The Roundabout Austral Players (S. R. Irving)
- 15 May 1937 Pot Luck (revue) Insurance M. & D. Socy. (Ray McLean)
- 22 May 1937 Past and Present The Vogue Theatre (Karen Greyson & Robert Pollard)
- 26 Jun 1937 David Copperfield Harry Thomas
- 29 Jun 1937 A Sleeping Clergyman Players Club (J. Appleton)
- 20 Jul 1937 The Young Person in Pink renamed That Certain Feeling Ella Massey Players
- 28 Jul 1937 The Path of Glory Chelsea Theatre Club (Frank Appleton)
- 17 Aug 1937 Bees on the Boat Deck Independent Theatre (J. Appleton)
- 12 Oct 1937 In Theatre Street Independent Theatre (J. Appleton)
- 14 Sep 1937 Her Shop Austral Players
- 25 Sep 1937 The Cradle Song Therese Desmond
- 19 Nov 1937 Angels of War Brunton Gibb Players (Ethel Lang)
- 30 Nov 1937 Worse Things Happen at Sea Players Club (Lynn Foster)
- 23 Feb 1938 The Brave and the Blind New Theatre League (Jerold Wells)
- 10 May 1938 Israel in the Kitchen Jewish Youth Theatre
- 25 May 1938 Springtide Chelsea Theatre Group (Joan Mackaness and Gwen Meredith)
- 28 Mar 1938 When Ladies Meet Players Club (William Craufuird)
- 2 Apr 1938 Time and the Conways Thespian Dramatic Prod. (Alan Stone)
- 25 Jun 1938 They Came By Night Players Club (Edwin Dean)
- 12 Jul 1938 The Merchant of Venice Players Club (Arthur Greenaway)
- 16 Aug 1938 Her Step-husband Austral Players
- 23 Nov 1938 Wives Have Their Uses (Gwen Meredith)
- 26 Nov 1938 Night Must Fall Thespian Dramatic Prod.
- 17-22 Dec 1938 The Living Marionette (Tuttifaentchen) Collegium Musicum (Paul Hindemith)
- 18 Mar 1939 Heroes Don't Care Bryant's Theatre Group
- 21 Mar 1939 Call It a Day Dajonian Repertory Society
- 15 Apr 1939 This Thing Called Love The Entertainers
- 3 May 1939 The Truth About Blayds Koorara Club (Mrs Kit Jamison)
- 15 Aug 1939 No More Music The Thirtyeight Theatre (May Hollinworth)
- 9 Dec 1939 Sheppey Players Club
- 13 Apr 1940 Baby Cyclone Dajonian Repertory Society
- 27 Apr 1940 The Rosary Theatre Productions
- 8 Jun 1940 A Kiss for Cinderella
- 18 Aug 1942 George & Margaret?? When We Are Married?? Modern Theatre Players (Edna Spilsbury)
- 10 Aug 1946 They Came to a City Aust. Academy of Dramatic Art
- 8 Nov 1946 Nine to Six Mina Shelley's School of Dramatic Art
- 13 May 1947 A Murder Has Been Arranged Dajonian Repertory Society
- 10 Jul 1950 You Don’t Play with Love Sydney Uni. Dram. Soc.
- 25 Aug 1950 The Merchant of Venice John Alden Company
- 6 Oct 1950 Measure for Measure John Alden Company
- 30 Nov 1950 Before the Party John Alden Company
- 24 Mar 1951 Smugglers Beware Children's National Theatre (Elsie Dayne)
- 9 May 1951 King Lear John Alden Company
- 25 Jul 1951 A Victorian Marriage John Alden Company
- 30 Jul 1951 Night Must Fall Saul Sterling Players
- 4 Aug 1951 Anna Christie John Alden Company
- 8 Sep 1951 Misalliance John Alden Company
- 12 Oct 1951 The Vigil John Alden Company
- 15 Nov 1951 Rusty Bugles John Alden Company
- 26 Nov 1951 They Came To a City Rathbone Academy of Dramatic Art
- 28 Nov 1951 Blithe Spirit Rathbone Academy of Dramatic Art
- 28 Feb 1952 Menaechmi (The Twins)/Comedy of Errors Mercury Theatre (Hans von Adlerstein/John Kay)
- 29 Feb 1952 Point of Departure Mercury Theatre (Norman Cull)
- 1 Mar 1952? A Phoenix Too Frequent/The Imaginary Invalid Mercury Theatre (John Kay)
- 17 Apr 1952 The Father Mercury Theatre (S. J. Kay/Alexander Archdale)
- 29 May 1952 Arms and the Man Mercury Theatre (Sydney John Kay)
- 14 Aug 1952 On Borrowed Time Mercury Theatre (Winifred Hindle)
- 29 Aug 1952 The Witch Mercury Theatre (Norman Cull)
- Oct 52 Love in Albania Independent Theatre (J. Appleton)
- 13 Nov 1952 They Knew What They Wanted Mercury Theatre (Sydney John Kay)
- 22 Nov 1952 Emil and the Detectives Mercury Theatre (Leila Blake)
- 3 Dec 1952 The Guardsman Mercury Theatre (Nigel Lovell)
- 12 Dec 1952 Winterset Mercury Theatre (Robin Lovejoy)
- 17 Feb 1953 As You Like It Mercury Theatre (Leila Blake)
- 28 Mar 1953 readings from Shaw Lloyd Berrell et al.
- 21 Apr 1953 Present Laughter Sydney Repertory Theatre
- 22 May 1953 The Man with a Load of Mischief Arts Council (Alexander Archdale)
- 20 Jun 1953 The Reluctant Dragon/The Circus Meryla Puppet Group (Norm Hetherington)
- 28 Jul 1953 Top of the Ladder Independent Theatre (Mark Stafford)
- 18 Aug 1953 Three Short Plays:The Tenor/The Proposal/Fumed Oak Mercury Theatre (Sydney John Kay/Owen Weingott/Leila Blake)
- 23 Aug 1953 Tovarich Mercury Theatre (Leila Blake)
- 16 Oct 1953 Dragon’s Mouth (reading) Independent Theatre (J. Appleton)
- 24 Nov 1953 The Guardsman Mercury Theatre (Nigel Lovell)
- 24 Nov 1953 Winterset Mercury Theatre (Robin Lovejoy)
- 3 Dec 1953 The Day’s Mischief Mercury Theatre (John Appleton)
- Mar 54 Merchant of Venice Mercury Theatre
- 7 May–17 July 1954 Top of the Bill Phillip Street Theatre (William Orr)
- 28 Jul 1954 Hamlet Phillip Street Theatre (William Orr)
- 15 Sep 1954–3? Jan 1955 Hit and Run Phillip Street Theatre (William Orr)
- 1955 Two for One Phillip Street Theatre
- 1955 Around the Loop Phillip Street Theatre

== Sources ==
- History of Australian Theatre - archive
- West, John Theatre in Australia Cassell 1978 ISBN 0-7269-9266-6
- Stephen Vagg, 'Finch, fry and factories: a brief history of Mercury Theatre', Australasian Drama Studies, 50, Apr 2007, 18-35
