= Mercury Theatre (Australia) =

Australian theatre company (1946–1954)

The Mercury Theatre was an Australian theatre company co-founded by Peter Finch and operating from 1946 to 1954. It was named after the American Orson Welles' theatre company of the same name.

== Founding ==
The Mercury was established in 1946 by Finch, Allan Ashbolt, Sydney John Kay, Colin Scrimgeour and John Wiltshire. The driving force for much of the company's time was Kay. They would frequently tour shows throughout the country.

The Mercury gained particular recognition for its 1948 production of The Imaginary Invalid starring Finch staged on the floor of O'Brien's Glass Factory in Sydney. The performance was seen by Laurence Olivier and Vivien Leigh who were so impressed they invited Finch to pursue his career in London, Kay revived the company in 1952, and it ran for the next two years from a base at St James' Hall in Sydney. Among those who acted in Mercury shows over the years included Rod Taylor, Ruth Cracknell and Lloyd Berrell.

== Productions ==
=== Original shows ===
- Three one-act plays at NSW State Conservatorium of Music, 16–17 July 1946:
  - Diamond Cuts Diamond by Nikolai Gogol – Directed by Sydney John Kay; starring Peter Bathurst, Peter Finch, Dennis Glenny, June Wimble
  - The Pastrybaker by Lope de Vega Carpio – Directed by Peter Finch; starring Jerome Levy, Alan Poolman
  - The Broken Pitcher by Heinrich von Kleist – Directed by John Wiltshire; starring Peter Finch, Tom Lake, June Wimble Costumes and sets: William Constable; painted sets: Margaret Olley; music by Sydney John Kay
- Midsummer Night by Lajos Biro
- Anatole's Wedding by Arthur Schnitzler
- The Imaginary Invalid by Molière, adapted by Creswick Jenkinson – 18 August 1948 (O'Brien's Glass Factory) & 20 September 1948 (Sydney Town Hall) – directed by Sydney John Kay, starring Allan Ashbolt, John Brunskill, Elsie Dayne, John Faassen, Peter Finch, Franz Folmer, Patricia Harrison, Arthur Husband, Tom Lake, Al Thomas, June Wimble
- French Without Tears by Terence Rattigan
- A Pickwick Story based on The Pickwick Papers by Charles Dickens adapted by Creswick Jenkinson – November 1948 – starring Lloyd Berrell, John Brunskill, Denys Burrows, Elsie Dayne, Betty Duncan, Zelle Gordon, John Hoskin, Norton Howarth, Margo Lee, Reginald Lye, David Magoffin, Peter Richards, Al Thomas, Edgar Veitch, Alan White, June Wimble
- The Typewriter by Jean Cocteau adapted by Donald Duncan – July 1950 radio show – Directed by Sydney John Kay starring Lenore Blackwood, John Brunskill, Shirley Cameron, John Hoskin, Sheila Macafee, John Unicomb

=== St James Hall productions ===
- Double bill in February 1952
  - The Twins by Plautus – Directed by Hans von Alderstein; starring Lloyd Berrell, John Barnard, Rod Taylor, Walter Sullivan, Ruth Cracknell; costumes and music by Sydney John Kay
  - Comedy of Errors by William Shakespeare – Directed by Sydney John Kay; starring John Dease, Ken McCarron, Rod Taylor, John Ewart, John Barnard, Walter Sullivan, Ruth Cracknell; sets by Robin Lovejoy
- Point of Departure by Jean Anouilh adapted by Kitty Black – March 1952 – Directed by Norman Cull; starring Alan White, John Brunskill, Alexander Archdale, Gloria Payten
- The Imaginary Invalid by Molière adapted by Creswick Jenkinson – March 1952 Directed by Sydney John Kay; starring Alan White, June Wimble, Marcia Hathaway
- Phoenix Too Frequent by Christopher Fry – March 1952 – Directed by Alexander Archdale; starring Dinah Shearing, Audrey Teesdale, Bruce Stewart
- The Father by August Strindberg – April 1952 – Directed by Alexander Archdale
- Arms and the Man by George Bernard Shaw – May 1952 – Directed by Lesley Lindsay; starring David Nettheim
- French Without Tears by Terence Rattigan – July 1952 – Directed by Ron Patten and Sydney John Kay; starring Barrie Cookson, Frank Lisle, Diana Davidson, Keith Walshe, June Wimble, Gustl Korner, John Gaundry
- On Borrowed Time by Paul Osborne – August 1952 – Directed by Winifred Hindle; starring Camilla Moxham, John Brunskill, Thora Small, John Barnard, Hazel Phillips, Marcia Hathaway, Dom Scott, Reginald Lyle; sets designed by Sydney John Kay
- The Witch by John Masefield – August 1952 – Producer Norman Cull; starring Rod Taylor, Barbara Brunton, Roger Climpson
- Love in Albania by Eric Linklater – October 1952
- They Knew What They Wanted by Sidney Howard – November 1952 – Directed by Sydney John Kay; starring Rod Taylor, Henry Gilbert, Marg Christensen
- Emil and the Detectives – November 1952 – Directed by Leila Blake; starring Minnie Love, John Weiner.
- The Guardsman by Ferenc Molnár – December 1952 – Directed by Nigel Lovell; starring Alan White, Muriel Steinbeck, David Nettheim, Minnie Love, Joan Landor, Evelyn Cartwright, John Weiner
- Winterset by Maxwell Anderson – December 1952 – Directed by Robin Lovejoy; starring Paul McNaughten, Harp McGuire, Gloria Payten, Ivon Vander, John Weiner
- Happily Ever After, 'an informal musical topicality' by Sydney John Kay with additional material from Fred Parsons, Ray Mathew, Kenneth Levison – December 1952 – Directed by Leila Blake; starring Moira Redmond, Frank Lisle, Patricia Martin, Minnie Love, Owen Weingott, Mark Roberts, Yvonne Louise, Valerie Newstead, Sonia Dowling. Sets by Peter Summerton and François Chollot
- As You Like It by William Shakespeare – February 1953 – Directed by Leila Blake; starring Roger Climpson, Charles Tasman, Mark Roberts, Rosamund Waring, Ken Hannam
- Don Juan in Hell by George Bernard Shaw – a reading only – Starring Lloyd Berrell, Kevin Brennan, Brenda Dunrich, Charles Tingwell, Reg Goldsworthy.
- Charley's Aunt by Brandon Thomas – March 1953 – Directed by Alexander Archdale; starring Richard Ashley, Alexander Archdale, Mark Roberts, John Meillon
- Ring Round the Moon by Jean Anouilh adapted by Christopher Fry – April 1953 – Starring Dennis Glenny, Barrie Cookson, Diana Davidson, Patricia Martin, John Barnard, Lyndall Barbour. Sets and costume designed by Robin Lovejoy
- The Man with a Load of Mischief by Ashley Dukes – May 1953
- The Happy Time by Samuel Taylor – June 1953 – Directed by Leila Blake; starring Lloyd Berrell, Rodney Taylor, Owen Weingott, Jean Anderson, Gustl Korner, Rosemund Waring
- The Reluctant Dragon/Circus – June 1953
- The Voice of the Turtle by John van Druten – July 1953 – Directed by Sydney John Kay; starring Joan Landor, Kerry Norton, Harp McGuire
- Three one act plays in August 1953
  - The Tenor by Frank Wedekind – August 1953 – Directed by Sydney John Kay; starring Paul Herlinger, Jon Ewing, Kenneth Warren, Jocelyn Hernfield, Gustl Korner, Penelope Muller, Edith Schreiber
  - The Proposal by Chekhov – Directed by Owen Weingott; starring Gustl Korner, Gloria Payten, Denys Burrows
  - Fumed Oak by Noël Coward – Directed by Leila Blake; starring Ken Hannam, Zelle Gordon, Beryl Marshall, Jean Anderson
- The Biggest Thief in Town by Dalton Trumbo – August 1953 – Directed by Joe Scully
- Tovarich by Jacques Deval adapted by Robert E. Sherwood September 1953 – directed by Leila Blake; starring Owen Weingott, Gloria Payten, Edith Schreiber, Paul Herlinger, Ken Hannam; sets designed and executed by Sydney John Kay and Ken Hannam
- The Day's Mischief by Lesley Storm – Directed by John Appleton starring Peter Houston, Wendy Blacklock, Brenda Senders
- The Servant of Two Masters by Goldoni
