= Savage Club (disambiguation) =

The Savage Club is a gentleman's club in London, it may also refer to:

- Leeds Savage Club
- Melbourne Savage Club
- Sydney Savage Club
