= Sixty Point Bold =

- Ad from SMH 14 Jul 1958
- Written by: Royston Morley
- Directed by: Royston Morley
- Country of origin: Australia
- Original language: English

Production
- Running time: 90 mins
- Production company: ABC

Original release
- Network: ABC
- Release: 16 July 1958 (Sydney, live)
- Release: 24 September 1958 (Melbourne, taped)

Sixty Point Bold is a 1959 Australian television play which aired on ABC. It was produced by the Sydney station of the network, ABN-2, and was kinescoped/telerecorded for showing in Melbourne on ABV-2. It was the second 90-minute live television play produced by ABN. It was written and produced by Royston Morley and aired July 16, 1959 for 90 minutes.

== Plot ==
Set in a fictional South American country, it concerned a newspaper magnate Andre Charvet who clashes with the president of the nation, whose democratic government has replaced a dictatorship. Charveet brings a foreign correspondent called David back to the country to campaign against the President.

== Cast ==
- Kevin Brennan as Andre Charvet
- James Condon as President Ortega de Riverda
- Dinah Shearing as Maria Charvet
- Bruce Beeby as Paul Crevel, Maria's lover
- Harp McGuire as David, a foreign correspondent
- Charles Tasman
- John Alden
- Owen Weingott

== Production ==
It was the third in a series of plays dealing with a man in political power. Advertising called it "the story of political intrigue, violence and romance in a Latin America state".

== See also ==
- List of live television plays broadcast on Australian Broadcasting Corporation (1950s)
