= John Wiltshire =

John Wiltshire may refer to:

- John Wiltshire (Arundel MP), English member of Parliament for Arundel (UK Parliament constituency), 1401, 1410 and 1413
- John Wiltshire (English actor) (fl. 1675–1684), English actor
- John Wiltshire (Australian actor) (fl. 1949–1953), Australian actor and producer
- John Wiltshire (cricketer) (born 1952), New Zealand cricketer
