= Paradise of Cheats =

1949 Australian radio serial

- Genre: drama serial
- Running time: 60 mins
- Country of origin: Australia
- Language: English
- Written by: Morris West
- Produced by: Morris West
- Recording studio: Melbourne
- Original release: 18 December 1949 – 1950

Paradise of Cheats is a 1949 Australian radio serial by Morris West.

It was recorded in 15 minute episodes but during its original broadcast four of these were put together to make one hour episodes. The Herald said "Interest is well sustained because the script Is excellent."

The Adelaide News said "Semi-documentary treatment helps what promises to be a better-than average thriller."

The Sunday Mail called it "an excellent presentation of its kind."

The series was popular and was repeated in 1953.

== Premise ==
Set in Europe, a ring of criminals circulate forged currency to interfere with the Marshall Plan.

== Cast ==
- Lloyd Berrell
- William Lloyd
- Douglas Kelly
