= Pederasty (radio program) =

1975 Australian radio program

"Pederasty" is a program broadcast on the Australian Broadcasting Corporation's Radio National network on 14 July 1975. Hosted by Richard Neville and produced by Allan Ashbolt as an episode of Lateline (unrelated to the later ABC TV series), the show was described by the Sydney Morning Herald as featuring a "frank" interview with "three men in their thirties who admitted sex relations with boys, and a teenage boy" – he was actually 20 at the time of recording – "who said he had been involved in such relationships since he was 12". The ABC's official description of the program was: "Pederasty, as described by the Penguin English Dictionary, is the homosexual relationship of a man with a boy. The subject usually creates feelings of revulsion and disgust within most people. The issues raised by such relationships are discussed by three pederasts".

== 1975 reception and ABC response ==
One letter to the editor published in The Sydney Morning Herald complained that the program demonstrated "a complete disregard for the physical danger to children." Another stated that while Neville "clearly let it be seen that he held that male adults who committed such acts on boys corrupted or exploited them, and he tried to get the men to admit this", he should have challenged them further when the topic of priests abusing children was raised in an offhand manner.

A tape of the program was turned over to police by Fred Nile, who objected to the content. Peter Nixon of the then-National Country Party also called for a public inquiry into the ABC in the program's aftermath. Ashbolt told The National Times that "“we can discuss on Lateline ideas that three years ago would have been regarded not only as heretical but subversive." Asked about the program, ABC chairman Richard Downing initially commented that he had not heard it himself but that the ABC's general intention is to "try to inform people about what (is) happening so that they might be forewarned and forearmed". Later, he added: "In general, men will sleep with young boys and that's the sort of thing the community ought to know about". The ABC's ultimate response was to introduce guidelines around the use of "four-letter words" and "crude expressions" while rejecting any new guidelines on program content, with Downing commenting that he wanted ABC staff to be "adventurous and imaginative (but not) titillating".
