= Fred Nile =

Australian politician (1934–2026)

The Reverend Fred Nile

Leader of the Christian Democratic Party (Note: Official title was Federal President.)
- In office 7 April 1998 – 29 March 2022
- Preceded by: Party established
- Succeeded by: Party dissolved

Leader of the Call to Australia Party
- In office 22 June 1977 – 7 April 1998
- Preceded by: Party established
- Succeeded by: Party abolished

Assistant President of the Legislative Council of New South Wales
- In office 28 November 2007 – 25 February 2019
- President: Peter Primrose; Amanda Fazio; Don Harwin; John Ajaka
- Preceded by: Position established
- Succeeded by: Shaoquett Moselmane

Member of the New South Wales Legislative Council
- In office 21 October 2004 – 25 March 2023
- Preceded by: Himself
- In office 19 September 1981 – 30 August 2004
- Preceded by: Roger de Bryon-Faes
- Succeeded by: Himself

Personal details
- Born: Frederick John Nile; 15 September 1934 Kings Cross, Sydney, New South Wales, Australia
- Died: 21 November 2026 (aged 92)
- Party: Revive Australia (2022–2023)
- Other political affiliations: Call to Australia (1977–1998); Christian Democratic (1988–2022); Christ in Government (2021); Seniors United (2022); Independent (2022)
- Spouse: Elaine Crealy (m. 1958; died 2011) Silvana Nero (m. 2013)
- Children: 4
- Education: Cleveland Street High School; University of New England; University of Divinity
- Occupation: Christian minister; Politician

Military service
- Allegiance: Australia
- Branch/service: Australian Army (1952–1954); Australian Army Reserve (1954–1972)
- Years of service: 1952–1972
- Rank: Major
- Unit: 4th Battalion, Royal New South Wales Regiment

Frederick John Nile (15 September 1934 – 21 November 2026) was an Australian politician and ordained Christian minister. Nile was a member of the New South Wales Legislative Council from 1981 to 2023, except for a period in 2004. He was re-elected at the 1991, 1999, 2007 and 2015 state elections and served as the assistant president of the Legislative Council from 2007 to 2019. Nile lost his seat at the 2023 New South Wales state election after four decades of being in parliament.

Nile was national president of the Christian Democratic Party, a conservative party which focused primarily on what it regarded as important moral and social issues. He was noted for his controversial comments, particularly his vocal opposition to drug use, abortion, pornography and homosexuality. He was patron of the Australian Christian Nation Association and vice-president of the Australian Christian Endeavour Union, an evangelical youth movement. Until his electoral defeat in 2023, Nile was the longest-serving member of the New South Wales Parliament.

== Early life ==
Nile was born in Kings Cross, New South Wales, and was educated at Mascot Public and Cleveland Street High School (1940–1949). In 1952, during the Korean War, at age 17, Nile volunteered to join the National Service and then transferred to the CMF/reserves which allowed him to avoid deployment to Korea and qualified for the rank of major, before retiring in 1972. Nile attended the Congregational Theological College, the United Faculty of Theology and the University of New England. He was awarded a Licentiate of Theology by the Melbourne College of Divinity.

== Early career ==
Nile was ordained a Congregationalist minister in 1964. From 1964 to 1967, he was national director of the Australian Christian Endeavour Movement, a Protestant youth leadership training organisation. In 1967–68, he was assistant director of the Billy Graham Crusade in Sydney before being employed as director of the Congregational Board of Evangelism in New South Wales. In 1970–71, he was involved in social work as director of the Methodist Mission to the People of New South Wales and, from 1971 to 1973, was Director of Outreach and Evangelism, Sydney City Wesley Central Methodist Mission.

In 1974, Nile was elected national co-ordinator and the New South Wales director of the Australian Federation of Festival of Light – Community Standards Organisation (FOL–CSO), an organisation which campaigned "for purity, love and family life".

== Political career ==
Nile was elected to the New South Wales Legislative Council on 19 September 1981 with 9.1% of the vote as the founder of the Call to Australia (Fred Nile) Group, established in 1977. Following the election to the Legislative Council of Jim Cameron (1984) and Nile's wife, Elaine (1988), the Call to Australia Group was officially recognised as a political party. Nile was re-elected to the council at the 1991 and 1999 state elections. Nile wrote his autobiography in 2001. In 2003, Nile resigned from the Uniting Church in Australia saying that the church had "officially decided to part with a literal interpretation of the Judeo-Christian Bible".

=== Federal candidacy (2004) ===
Nile resigned from the NSW Parliament on 30 August 2004 in order to contest the 2004 federal election, seeking a position in the Australian Senate on a platform of opposition to the recognition of gay marriages. He was the last candidate excluded after the distribution of votes on the 77th count and was not elected to the Senate. A few months later, he was re-appointed to the Legislative Council to fill the vacancy created by his own resignation.

=== Return to state politics ===
At the 2007 New South Wales state election, Nile was re-elected for a further eight-year term and was appointed to the newly created position of assistant president of the NSW Legislative Council.

In 2007, Nile retired as the New South Wales director of the Australian Federation of Festival of Light. He served as the president of the Fellowship of Congregational Churches, a group of Australian Congregationalists who declined to join the Uniting Church in 1977, for the years 2007 to 2012, and again for the 2013/14 year.

In November 2009, he stated his decision to retire in 2015, but later announced his decision to accept the Christian Democratic Party (CDP) nomination for the Legislative Council at the New South Wales state election on 28 March 2015. In 2014, Nile announced that he would be contesting the next state election in 2015 with his deputy, Ross Clifford. In 2015, he supported the Liberal government's privatisation of the state's electricity poles and wires.

In January 2017, Nile was denied entry to the United States where he had been invited to attend the inauguration of Donald Trump. He was later granted a visa and an apology, though no reason was given for the initial refusal.

=== Demise of the Christian Democratic Party and aftermath: 2021–2026 ===
In April 2021, Nile announced he would retire in November 2021, nominating Lyle Shelton to replace him. However, in September that year he rescinded Shelton's endorsement and announced he would complete his term. In 2022, the Christian Democratic Party was dissolved.

Following the CDP's dissolution, Nile said he planned to form a new party called Christ in Government (Fred Nile Alliance) but, in May 2022, he instead joined the Seniors United Party of Australia. The party was not registered with the New South Wales Electoral Commission and was deregistered with the Australian Electoral Commission less than two months later.

Nile renewed his retirement in October 2022, intending to give his final speech in parliament on 17 November. However, in February 2023, he announced his intention to nominate for re-election. He appeared on the ballot paper as Group G, second to his wife Silvana, with no party affiliation. Having only two candidates, the group had no above-the-line voting box which experts felt gave it no prospect of election.

In the event, Fred and Silvana Nile (Group G) were unsuccessful, receiving 2,507 votes, 0.05% of the total votes/ballot papers cast.

== Controversies ==
=== Comments on Pederasty ABC program ===
In July 1975, the Australian Broadcasting Corporation's Radio National aired a program entitled Pederasty which featured Richard Neville candidly interviewing "three men in their thirties who admitted to sex relations with boys, and a teenage boy who said he had been involved in such relationships since he was 12". Nile objected to the program's content and turned a tape of the show over to police.

=== Comments on the Lindt Cafe siege ===
In January 2015, Nile argued that male hostages who fled the Lindt Cafe siege should not receive bravery awards, as giving them one would "cheapen" it. He stated during an interview on Channel Seven's Sunrise program that no hostages at Martin Place should receive bravery awards and their actions had potentially risked the lives of their fellow hostages, adding "Usually men try to protect the women and it seems that the men were saving their own skin and leaving the women there". He later added that he mis-spoke when he said that "the only man inside the café had been the man holding the gun".

In a media release dated 14 January 2015, Nile stated, "I fully support Prime Minister Tony Abbott's recommendation to the Governor General, Sir Peter Cosgrove, that Mrs Dawson and Mr Johnson should be honoured with posthumous bravery awards". He also recommended that proper consideration should be given to the actions of others involved, including other hostages and police.

=== Comments on homosexuality ===
Nile has been described by Buzzfeed as "one of Australia's longest-running anti-gay campaigners". He was opposed to homosexuality which he has described as a "mental disorder" and called homosexuality a "lifestyle choice" that is "immoral, unnatural and abnormal". Nile has also stated that he was "totally opposed to the bashing of homosexuals ... totally opposed to any violence or attacks directed against homosexual men or lesbians ... opposed to strong (malicious) verbal attacks".

Nile opposed the Sydney Gay and Lesbian Mardi Gras, which he described as a "public parade of immorality and blasphemy". He objected to the "indecency and obscenity in various parts of the Mardi Gras" and stated that it reinforced "the worst stereotypes". Each year, he led a prayer gathering against the event.

In 2005, Nile called for the repealing of New South Wales anti-vilification laws, saying that the law was discriminatory and should either cover all citizens or be abolished. He also said that the Homosexual Vilification Act was being abused to gag free speech and prevent open non-malicious public discussion.

Following a 2011 announcement by Penny Wong, a Labor Party federal government minister, that her same-sex partner was pregnant, Nile publicly denounced Wong's actions, saying "I'm totally against a baby being brought up by two mothers" and "She needn't have made it public. It just promotes their lesbian lifestyle and trying to make it natural where it's unnatural." During a televised debate on the show Q&A, Nile told Gene Robinson, the first priest in an openly gay relationship to be consecrated a bishop in a major Christian denomination, that he "should be ashamed to be a bishop and going against the church".

Nile used his newspaper, Family World News, to urge a no vote on the Australian Marriage Law Postal Survey.

=== Comments on the Australian Greens ===
Nile was a frequent critic of the Australian Greens, saying that they have exploited genuine concern for the environment to garner political influence to "push their agenda of social engineering". He also criticised the Greens for what he called "duplicit political expediency", citing their push to legalise and fund "illicit drug habits for addicts" such as heroin and cannabis in what he said was in contravention of publicised Greens policy. Nile has also labelled the Greens as being "anti-family", "anti-Christian", and "pagan", citing what he believed to be pro-pornography and pro-sex industry policies and their opposition to the current practice of opening parliament with daily prayers.

Nile once described the Greens as the "watermelon party – green on the outside but red on the inside, with a bit of a pink tinge".

=== Comments on Muslims and neo-pagans ===
Following the Moscow theatre hostage crisis in 2002, Nile asked whether the then state minister of police would consider banning full body coverings, like those worn by the Chechen terrorists, from parliament and places of public gathering to prevent the carriage of weapons or explosive devices. Nile has attempted to pass bills in the New South Wales Legislative Council that would prohibit the wearing of full-face coverings, such as the hijab or niqāb, six times – 2006, 2010, 2011, 2014, 2017 and 2019. All failed to be passed and lapsed upon dissolution of the chamber at elections.

On 10 March 2007, Nile raised concern that Australian embassy officials posted in Islamic nations were favouring the immigration of Muslim over Christian refugees. He called for a moratorium on Muslim immigration to Australia: "Australians deserve a breathing space so the situation can be carefully assessed", he told an audience in North Ryde.

In 2010, Nile asked for the removal of the then Australian Muslim leader Sheik Taj El-Din Hilaly after the sheik placed the blame for sexual assault on the female victims.

Nile was opposed to Australian neopagans, having said that the Christian Democrats would "do what it can to stop pagan weddings and witchcraft or Wicca activities".

=== Comparison of ethics classes to Nazism ===
Ethics classes were introduced by the Keneally Labor government as an alternative for children who did not want to attend traditional scripture classes. Prior to the 2011 state election, Barry O'Farrell made a pre-election pledge of not scrapping the ethics classes. Following the election, Nile, who was vehemently opposed to the ethics classes, introduced a private members bill proposing the abolition of the classes at the end of the 2011 calendar year. Debate on the bill was adjourned until 16 September; and eventually Nile was successful in pushing the government to establish a parliamentary inquiry to examine whether ethics classes in NSW schools should be abolished. Meanwhile, in introducing his bill into the Legislative Council, Nile gained headlines by arguing that the ethics course was based on a philosophy linked to Nazism and Communism.

== Parliament activities ==
Nile served on the New South Wales' Parliamentary Standing Committee on Social Issues (1988–1995), facilitating legislative reforms on adoption laws, drug abuse among youth, rape rates and pornography, domestic violence, youth violence, youth rural suicides, compensation for medically acquired AIDS/HIV victims, juvenile justice, births, deaths and marriage records.

From 2007 to 2019, Nile served as the assistant president of the New South Wales Legislative Council.

Nile also served on the New South Wales' Parliamentary Standing Committee on Law and Justice, the New South Wales' Joint Parliamentary Select Committee on Electoral Reform, the Parliamentary Select Committee into Firearms, the Joint Parliamentary Select Committee into the Management of Parliament, as chairman of the Cross City Tunnel Inquiry, chairman of the General Purpose Standing Committee No. 1, chairman of the Select Committee on Electoral and Political Party Funding and chairman of the Joint Select Committee on the Royal North Shore Hospital among many others. Until his defeat as a Legislative Council candidate, Nile served as a member of the Standing Committee on Social Issues.

Despite his many conservative positions, over the years Nile supported some progressive positions. In 1983, he supported the Aboriginal Land Rights Act and in 2012 introduced legislation in the NSW Parliament to repeal the "gay panic" defence in the state. He supported legislation to expunge historical homosexual convictions, was a proponent of the Voice to Parliament and introduced legislation supporting Aboriginal rights in 2022.

== Personal life and death ==
In 1958, Nile married Elaine Crealy, who was a member of the Legislative Council for 14 years. They had three sons and a daughter. Elaine died in October 2011 at age 75. In 2013, at age 79, Nile married Silvana Nero.

Nile died on 21 November 2026, aged 92. His death drew public tributes from politicians including Lyle Shelton, Kellie Sloane and John Graham. Alex Greenwich, Member for Sydney, requested a state funeral for Nile but later rescinded the request following public backlash and discussions with Nile's widow.

== See also ==
- Congregational Federation of Australia
- List of people declared personae non gratae in Azerbaijan

== Bibliography ==
- Fred Nile: A Biography Sydney: Strand: 2001: ISBN 1-876825-79-0
