= Barbara Brunton =

Australian actress

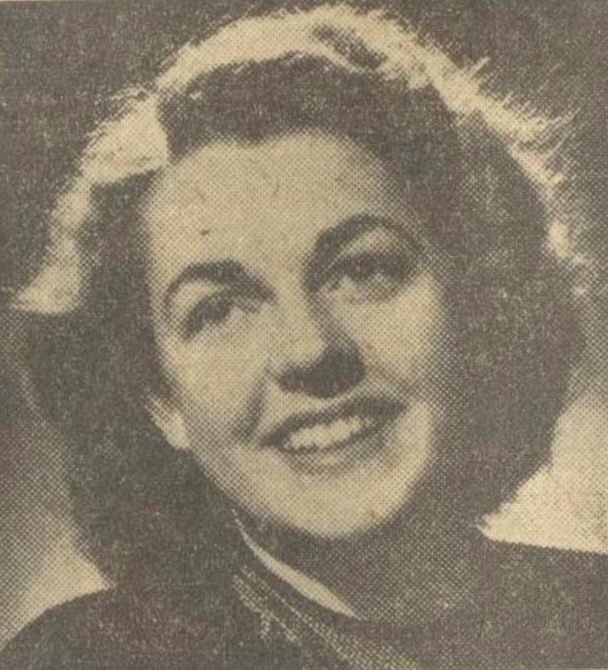
- Brunton in 1947
- Born: Barbara Joan Brunton Gibb; 13 October 1927
- Died: 9 June 2014 (aged 86)
- Other name: Barbara Joan Revill
- Occupation: Actress
- Family: Ethel Lang (mother) James Brunton Gibb (father)

Barbara Joan Brunton Gibb (13 October 1927 – 29 June 2014), known professionally as Barbara Brunton, was an Australian actress of stage and radio, active between 1940 and 1952.

== History ==
Brunton was born in 1927, the daughter of actress Ethel Lang and theatre impresario, teacher and actor James Brunton Gibb. Barbara was brought up at Lenore Street, Five Dock, Sydney, educated at Fort Street High School, before starting an entertainment career as a radio and stage actress, associated with Doris Fitton's Independent Theatre and the Mercury Theatre professionally under the name Barbara Brunton.

In 1950, Michael Pate and his wife, Bud Tingwell and Brunton had ideas of forming a film production company, but nothing came of it. She was engaged to Tingwell in December 1950, but nothing more was heard of that engagement either.

Brunton left Australia in October 1952 and married journalist Stuart Lindsay Revill (1929–2019)on Long Island, New York in December 1952. He was for four years head of the ABC's American office in New York, then head of the ABC's Europe office, London. Actress Kate Revill was a daughter.

Brunton died on 29 June 2014, aged 86.

Her sister, Judith Wendy Brunton Gibb (15 October 1925 – ), known as Wendy Gibb, and brother Peter Brunton Gibb (1924–2011) were juvenile leads with the BSA Players in the 1930s.

== Selected appearances ==
Stage

- Housemaster by Ian Hay at Minerva Theatre 1940
- as Wendy in Peter Pan at Minerva Theatre 1946
- Black Chiffon by Lesley Storm at the Independent Theatre 1952
- The Witch by John Masefield at the Mercury Theatre

Radio

- in My Favorite Wife Lux Radio Theatre starring Jack Davey prod. Harry Dearth 1940
- as bigot's daughter in Deep are the Roots by James Gow and Arnaud d'Usseau 1947
- as Anne Ridd in Lorna Doone serial on ABC radio 1949
- regular in "Aunt Jenny's Real Life Stories" series ("Aunt Jenny" was her mother, Ethel Lang)
- as Sheila in An Inspector Calls radio serial
- as Bernadette in an adaptation of The Song of Bernadette by Franz Werfel in Lux Radio Theatre 1949
- The Queen's Husband Caltex Theatre 1949
- as June in Funny Face George Gershwin 1950
- Quiet Weekend
- Who Lies There by Philip Johnson with Gordon Chater, Nancye Stewart in Lux Radio Theatre 1950
- Rosemary by Elaine Sterne Carrington
- The Madwoman of Chaillot by Jean Giraudoux
- Front Page Girl by William Morum and William Dinner 1951
- Night Beat Saturday night drama series
- Mine Own Executioner 1952
- The Adventures of Rocky Starr Sci-fi serial on 3DB
- The Blue Lamp Caltex Theatre
- Blue Hills, long running ABC serial, as "Sally"; succeeded in 1952 by June Salter.

Connection, if any, between Barbara and her fellow actress Dorothy Brunton (1890–1977) has not yet been found. Dorothy's father was John Brunton (c. 1848– 22 July 1909), born in Scotland. Barbara's grandfather was James Gibb ( –c. 1949) and married Mary Brunton ( –1952) on 4 July 1891. Barbara's father James Gibb (13 January 1897 – 28 June 1968) changed his name to James Brunton Gibb before he married Ethel Isabel Lang (1902 – November 1995) on 1 September 1923.
