= Allan Ashbolt =

Australian journalist, producer, and broadcaster

- Born: Allan Campbell Ashbolt; 24 November 1921; Melbourne, Australia
- Died: 9 June 2005 (aged 83); Sydney, Australia
- Education: Caulfield Grammar School
- Occupations: Journalist; producer; broadcaster

Allan Campbell Ashbolt (24 November 1921 – 9 June 2005) was an Australian journalist, producer, and broadcaster.

== Early life ==
He was born in Melbourne and attended Caulfield Grammar School. He served with the Australian Imperial Force in World War II. Following the war, Ashbolt began acting and helped establish the Mercury Theatre with Peter Finch among others. He appeared in government documentary films. Ashbolt was a film librarian at the NSW Film Council in the mid-fifties, before he was hired by the Australian Broadcasting Corporation (ABC) as a producer.

== Career ==
In 1959 he was appointed as the ABC's first North America correspondent. In 1963 he served as a correspondent and executive producer of Four Corners, which has become Australia's longest-running investigative journalism/current affairs television program. He was known for his belief that the ABC — which had been and was almost entirely conservative at the time — should promote free speech and controversial political content. Ashbolt held senior positions at the ABC, until retiring after a 25-year career with the network. He also wrote for the New Statesman, a leftist British political magazine.

In July 1975, Ashbolt produced "Pederasty", an ABC Radio program that featured an interview with "three men in their thirties who admitted sex relations with boys, and a teenage boy who said he had been involved in such relationships since he was 12".

He died in Sydney in June 2005.

== See also ==
- List of Caulfield Grammar School people
