= The Merchant of Venice (1961 film) =

1961 film by Alan Burke

- The Sydney Morning Herald 13 Sep 1961
- Based on: play The Merchant of Venice by William Shakespeare
- Directed by: Alan Burke
- Starring: Owen Weingott
- Country of origin: Australia
- Original language: English

Production
- Running time: 120 mins
- Production company: Australian Broadcasting Commission

Original release
- Network: ABC
- Release: 13 September 1961

The Merchant of Venice is a 1961 Australian television adaptation of the play by William Shakespeare that aired on 13 September 1961 in Sydney, and on 25 October 1961 in Melbourne.

== Cast ==
- Owen Weingott as Shylock
- Tanya Halesworth as Portia
- Ron Graham as Bassanio
- John Unicomb as Antonio
- Annette Andre as Jessica
- Barry Creyton as Lorenzo
- John Faasen as Gratiano
- Carolyn Keely as Nerissa
- Alistair Roberts as Lancelot Gobbo
- Leonard Teale as the Prince of Morocco

== Production ==
The Sydney Morning Herald called it "the most important television play of the year. and among Sydney's actresses the role of Portia was the most sought after."

It went to the relatively inexperienced Tanya Halesworth who was a presenter at the ABC (she had only acted once on stage in The Women). She won the role over two other candidates. Director Alan Burke said "I am not unduly worried that Tanya hasn't done Shakespeare before because I haven't produced a Shakespeare play before."

Burke saw Portia "as a beautiful debutante, the darling of the deb set of her day. I wanted a beautiful girl for the role, one with wit, astuteness, vivacity; but one with a little bit of edge to her tongue. Tanya has all these."

All members of the cast except Halesworth and Andre had experience doing Shakespeare. Weingott, Graham, Roberts and Vernon had all performed their roles in previous productions of Merchant on stage.

Annette Andre later recalled "here I was, a nice Catholic girl – God! I’m a long way from that now – playing Jessica, daughter of Shylock. I would’ve loved to play Portia, but Tanya gave a wonderful performance."

Barry Creyton later recalled, "I remember during my vital speech to Jessica, “how sweet the moonlight sleeps upon this bank”, a makeup girl dropped a jar nearby. That was very disconcerting, but being live, we just continued as if a makeup jar dropping onto concrete was a common sound in old Venice." He also remembered that when the programme was recorded that "lost half an hour of sound", so he and Annette Andre "had to go back to the studio to loop one of our scenes."

Creyton said the cast "wanted to make the Shakespeare accessible to even a non-Shakespearean ear. We tried to make it sound like actual conversational English and were criticised by old Shakespearean actors for doing so."

Leonard Teale had appeared in a production of the play at the Independent.

In September 1961 the ABC presented a radio adaptation of the play done in Melbourne, with a cast including Patricia Kennedy and James Bailey.

== Reception ==
The Sydney Morning Herald called it "a masterful piece of work in which a predominant young cast gave the play flesh-and-blood virility".

The Australian Woman's Weekly said the play was "an eye-opener to me. THE eye-opening came from the depth of Tanya Halesworth's portrayal of Portia, the strength of Owen Weingott's Shylock, and producer Alan Burke's fresh interpretation and splendid production. I expected it to be good, but not as good as it was."

Filmink thought "Alan Burke shows skill with blocking actors and moving the camera, though is reticent to use close ups apart from when characters are performing soliloquies. "

The play was screened in Melbourne along with two other Shakespeare plays on the school syllabus, A Midsummer Night's Dream and the Royston Morley production of Hamlet.
