= Hugh Marlowe =

American actor (1911–1982)

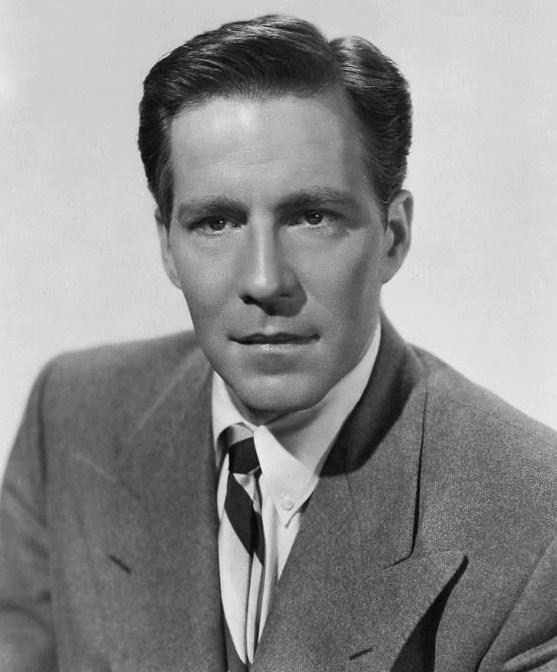
- Marlowe in a publicity still for All About Eve (1950)
- Born: Hugh Herbert Hipple; January 30, 1911; Philadelphia, Pennsylvania, U.S.
- Died: May 2, 1982 (aged 71); New York City, New York, U.S.
- Years active: 1936–1982
- Spouses: Edith Atwater (m. 1941; div. 1946) K.T. Stevens (m. 1946; div. 1968) Rosemary Torri (m. 1968)
- Children: 3

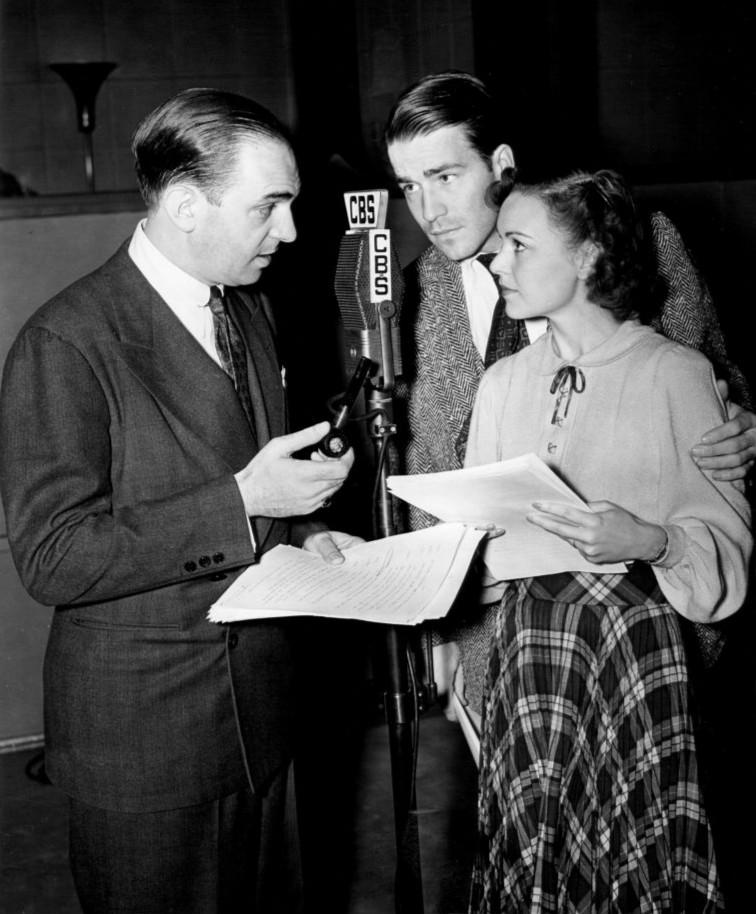
Marlowe (center) as Ellery Queen with Santos Ortega and Marian Shockley in The Adventures of Ellery Queen, 1939

Hugh Marlowe (born Hugh Herbert Hipple; January 30, 1911 – May 2, 1982) was an American film, television, stage, and radio actor.

== Early life ==
Marlowe (née Hugh Herbert Hipple) was born in Philadelphia, Pennsylvania. He was of primarily English ancestry, his family having been in what is now the northeastern United States since the early colonial period. Hipple had several ancestors on the Mayflower; through his father, he was descended from Myles Standish through Standish's son Alexander Standish. He was also descended from Isaac Allerton and Isaac Allerton Jr. and the American Revolutionary War hero Ichabod Alden, through whom he is descended from John Alden. Through his mother, he was descended from John Endecott.

== Career ==
=== Stage ===
Marlowe began his stage career in the 1930s at the Pasadena Playhouse in California, first under his birth name, then as John Marlowe. He was first seen in Arrest That Woman (1936) on Broadway, settling on Hugh Marlowe as his stage name. His Broadway appearances included Kiss the Boys Goodbye, The Land Is Bright, Lady in the Dark, Laura, and Duet for Two Hands.

In 1939 and 1940, Marlowe was a voice actor in two network radio programs. He performed the role of Jim Curtis in the soap opera Brenda Curtis, and he played the title character Ellery Queen in the first radio version of The Adventures of Ellery Queen.

=== Film and television ===
Marlowe was usually a secondary lead or supporting actor in the films he appeared in. His first film was Brilliant Marriage (1936). His films included Meet Me in St. Louis (1944). For a time, he worked regularly for 20th Century Fox, appearing in Twelve O'Clock High (1949), All About Eve (1950), Night and the City (1950), The Day the Earth Stood Still (1951), Rawhide (1951), and Howard Hawks' Monkey Business (1952). His later films include Earth vs. the Flying Saucers (1956), Elmer Gantry (1960), Birdman of Alcatraz (1962), and Seven Days in May (1964).

Marlowe played a real person, the Reverend William Hyde, in the 1956 episode "Dig or Die, Brother Hyde" of the television anthology series, Crossroads. In the 1957 episode, "Jhonakehunkga Called Jim", set in 1883, Marlowe plays the Reverend Jacob Stucki, who is dispatched to the mission at the Winnebago reservation. Marlowe guest-starred in the 1961 episode "Mayberry on Record" of CBS's The Andy Griffith Show. In 1962, he played the part of Sam Garner in the episode "The Pitchwagon" on CBS's Rawhide.

Marlowe made six guest appearances on CBS's Perry Mason, starring Raymond Burr. Among those roles, he was cast as district attorney and Mason client Brander Harris in "The Case of the Fraudulent Foto" (1959), and as murder victim Commander James Page in "The Case of the Slandered Submarine" (1960). He also played murder victim Ernest Stone in "The Case of the Nebulous Nephew" (1963), a doctor Lambert in "The Case of The Sleepy Slayer" (1963) and murderer Guy Munford in "The Case of the Hasty Honeymooner" (1965). In 1964, Marlowe appeared as Clay Billings on The Virginian in the episode "The Intruders." Marlowe also performed as Donald Burton, a newspaper reporter, on a 1965 episode of Hazel titled "Hazel's Day in Court" and as pretentious TV documentarian Bainbridge Wells in Voyage to the Bottom of the Sea (1966).

In later years, Marlowe was a regular on the NBC television daytime drama Another World, the last of four actors who portrayed the Matthews family patriarch Jim Matthews. Marlowe played the role from 1969 until his death in 1982.

Marlowe bore a marked physical and vocal resemblance to actor Richard Carlson who co-starred with him in the 1943 short subject training film, For God and Country, and the two are often mistaken for each other.

== Personal life and death ==
Marlowe was married three times, each time to an actress. Between 1941 and 1946, he was married to Edith Atwater. From 1946 to 1968, he was married to K.T. Stevens, with whom he had two sons, Jeffrey and Christian. From 1968 to his death, he was married to Rosemary Torri with whom he had one son, Hugh Michael II.

Marlowe died in 1982 from a heart attack at age 71 and was buried at Ferncliff Cemetery and Mausoleum in Hartsdale, Westchester County, New York.

== Partial filmography ==
- Brilliant Marriage (1936) – Richard G. Taylor, III
- It Couldn't Have Happened – But It Did (1936) – Edward Forrest
- Married Before Breakfast (1937) – Kenneth
- Between Two Women (1937) – Priest
- Marriage Is a Private Affair (1944) – Joseph I. Murdock
- Mrs. Parkington (1944) – John Marbey
- Meet Me in St. Louis (1944) – Colonel Darly
- Come to the Stable (1949) – Robert 'Bob' Mason
- Twelve O'Clock High (1949) – Lieutenant Colonel Ben Gately
- Night and the City (1950) – Adam Dunn
- All About Eve (1950) – Lloyd Richards
- Rawhide (1951) – Rafe Zimmerman
- Mr. Belvedere Rings the Bell (1951) – Reverend Charles Watson
- The Day the Earth Stood Still (1951) – Tom Stevens
- Bugles in the Afternoon (1952) – Captain Edward Garnett
- Diplomatic Courier (1952) – Narrator (voice, uncredited)
- Wait till the Sun Shines, Nellie (1952) – Ed Jordan
- Monkey Business (1952) – Hank Entwhistle
- Way of a Gaucho (1952) – Don Miguel Aleondo
- The Stand at Apache River (1953) – Colonel Morsby
- Casanova's Big Night (1954) – Stefano Di Gambetta
- Garden of Evil (1954) – John Fuller
- Illegal (1955) – Ray Borden
- Alfred Hitchcock Presents (1956) (Season 2 Episode 14: "John Brown's Body") - Harold Skinner
- World Without End (1956) – John Borden
- Earth vs. the Flying Saucers (1956) – Dr. Russell A. Marvin
- The Black Whip (1956) – Lorn Crawford
- Alfred Hitchcock Presents (1957) (Season 2 Episode 33: "A Man Greatly Beloved") - Reverend Richard Fell
- Alfred Hitchcock Presents (1957) (Season 3 Episode 8: "Last Request") - District Attorney Bernard Butler
- Alfred Hitchcock Presents (1959) (Season 4 Episode 35: "Touché") - Phillip Baxter
- Perry Mason (1959) (Season 2 Episode 16: The Case of the Fraudulent Foto) - D.A. Brander Harris
- Elmer Gantry (1960) – Reverend Philip Garrison
- Alfred Hitchcock Presents (1961) (Season 7 Episode 10: "Services Rendered") - Dr. Ralph Mannick (character credited as Dr. Mannix in end credits)
- The Long Rope (1961) – Jonas Stone
- The Alfred Hitchcock Hour (1962) (Season 1 Episode 10: "Day of Reckoning") - Harold
- Birdman of Alcatraz (1962) – Albert Comstock
- 13 Frightened Girls (1963) – John Hull
- Seven Days in May (1964) – Harold McPherson
- Perry Mason (1964) (Season 8 Episode 4: The Case of the Sleepy Slayer) - Dr. Lambert
- Castle of Evil (1966) – 'Doc' Corozal
- How to Steal the World (1968) – Grant (archive footage)
- The Last Shot You Hear (1969) – Charles Nordeck

== Radio appearances ==
- Lux Radio Theatre (1952) – Episode: "Come to the Stable"
