= Thomas Diafoirus =

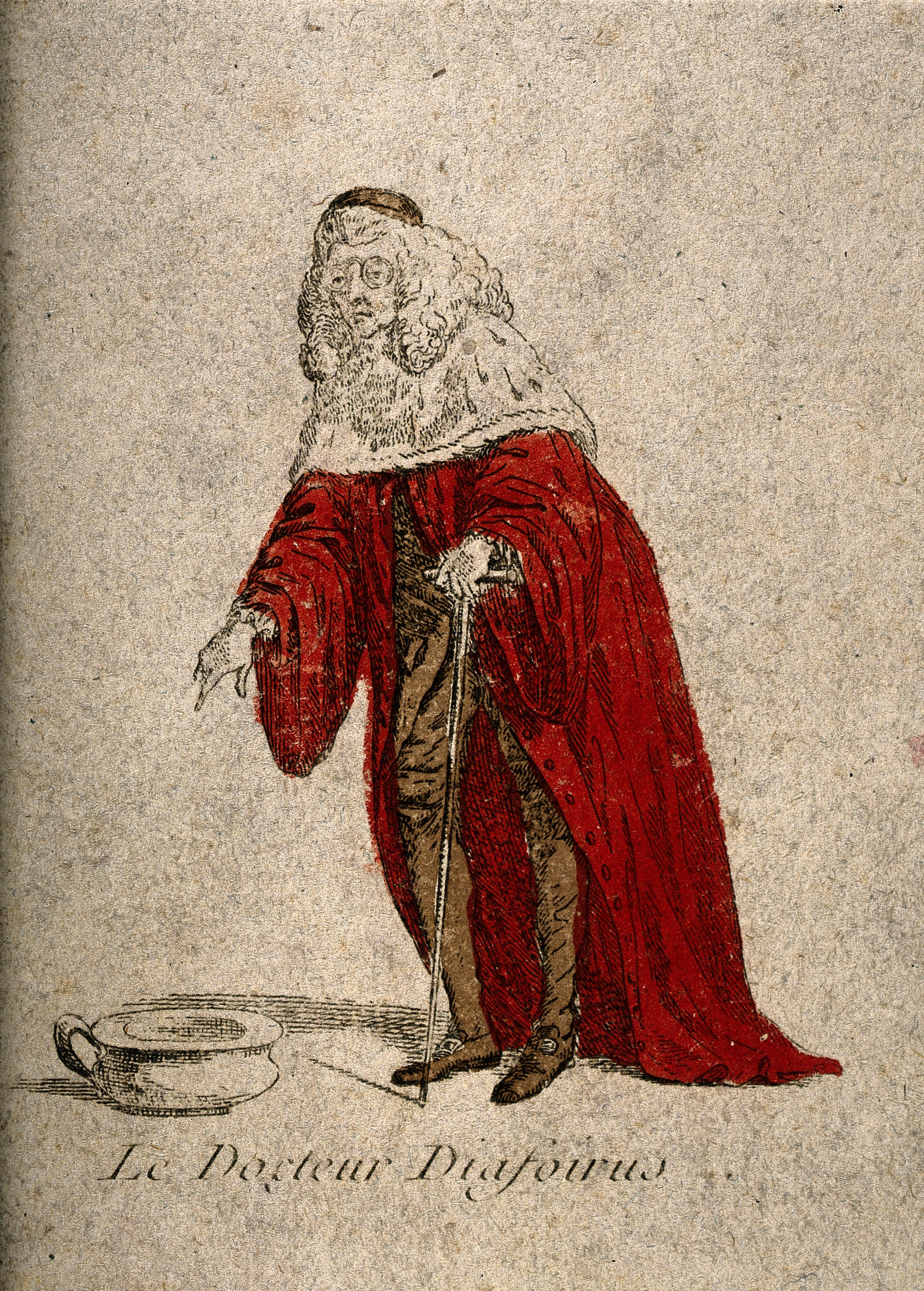
Doctor Diafoirus, a physician from Molière's Le malade imaginaire

Thomas Diafoirus is a doctor from the play Le Malade imaginaire by Molière (1673). He proposes to marry the title-character's older daughter Angélique; Molière portrays Diafoirus as a pedantic man who loves to use elaborate scientific terminology, but is not overly concerned with his patients' actual health. The characters of Thomas Diafoirus and his father "monsieur Diafoirus", also a doctor in the play, partly derive from the dottore character in the Italian Commedia dell'arte, but according to most scholars are very much dramatic devices for voicing Molière's critique of the medical culture of his time.
