= Ethel Lang (actress) =

Australian actress (1902–1995)

Ethel Lang AM
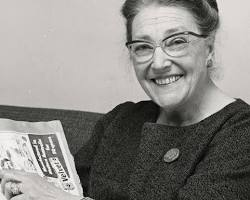
- Radio Star REhel Lang in 1943, publicity picture for Aunt Jenny's Real Life Stories
- Born: Ethel Isabel Lang; 28 June 1902; Surry Hills, New South Wales, Australia
- Died: 1 November 1995 (aged 93); Sydney, New South Wales, Australia
- Other name: Ethel Isabel Brunton Gibb (married name)
- Occupation: Actress
- Spouse: James Brunton Gibb
- Family: Barbara Brunton (daughter)

Ethel Isabel Lang AM (28 June 1902 – 1 November 1995), also known as Ethel Brunton Gibb, was an Australian actress prominent as a pioneering local radio performer during the 1930s, but also appeared in numerous stage roles. From the age of seven she appeared in school plays and concerts before being asked to play Napoleon's son in The Royal Divorce. Stage roles included Shakespeare's Macbeth and The Merchant of Venice

Lang remained active in the industry to her death in 1995, aged 93, performing alongside her former radio contemporary and Blue Hills star Queenie Ashton in a production of The Old Grey Mare, to mark the 50th anniversary of the rural department of the ABC.

== Biography ==
=== Early life ===
Lang was born in the Sydney suburb of Surry Hills, New South Wales, to a father from Germany and a mother of an English background who worked as a hairdresser's receptionist, her father came to Australia with his three brothers and sister from Baden-Baden, aged 14, she had two sisters, one Beryl died at thirteen weeks from malnutrition and another sister Rita died at one year and ten months old from inflammation of the stomach.

She attended high school at Ladies Collegiate High School, St. Johns Church, before attending Bethlehem College.

=== Radio career ===
Lang became her career in radio began in 1924, and while raising a family during The Depression, World War II and beyond, she had an independent career:

- Leading parts in ABC radio feature plays 1930–40.
- One Man's Family for commercial radio 2SM.
- Aunt Jenny's Real Life Stories s the titular "Aunty Jenny" for commercial radio 2UE 1943–51.
- In the long-running ABC serial The Lawsons as Mrs. Lawson, then as Mary "Meg" MacArthur in its even longer-running sequel "Blue Hills". as Mary "Meg" MacArhur, starring alongside Queenie AShton, Ruth Cracknell and Gwen Plumb.
- Minor parts in other commercial radio serials, including When a Girl Marries and Mary Livingstone MD.

Like her husband James Brunton Gibb, she was generous in her support of charitable events, notably Legacy. On occasion, she adjudicated at eisteddfods and produced performances by the Brunton Gibb Players, when she used her married name.

== Recognition ==
She was made a Member of the Order of Australia (AM) in 1992 for services to the arts and community.

== Personal life ==
Lang married actor and elocution teacher James Brunton Gibb (13 January 1897 – 28 June 1968) on 1 September 1923; they frequently appeared on stage together. Their children were:

- Peter Brunton Gibb (1924–2011) served with the RAAF during WWII and married Patricia Saunders in 1946.
- Judith Wendy Brunton Gibb (1925– ), professionally known as Wendy Brunton Gibb
- Barbara Joan Brunton Gibb (1927–2014), professionally known as Barbara Brunton, married journalist Stuart Revill (1929–2019) in 1952. Revill had various positions with the ABC between 1959 and 1992.
- David Brunton Gibb (1939– )

The whole family used "Brunton" as though it were part of their surname.

=== Family ===
Peter and Wendy Brunton Gibb both excelled in elocution. Wendy appeared in the 1949 film Sons of Matthew, left for London and joined Dan O'Connor's British Commonwealth Players and in 1953 became Mrs Michael Benge.

Barbara was educated at Fort Street High School and worked as a radio and stage actress associated with Doris Fitton's Independent Theatre and Mercury Theatre

David became Professor of Anaesthetics and Intensive Care at UNSW in 2001. He is commemorated at Sydney High School by the David Brunton Gibb Prize for Soccer.
