= James Brunton Gibb =

Australian actor (1897–1968)

- Born: James Thomas Gibb; 13 January 1897
- Died: 28 June 1968 (aged 71)
- Occupations: Actress, theatre impresario, elocution teacher
- Spouse: Ethel Lang
- Family: Barbara Brunton

James Brunton Gibb LTCL (13 January 1897 – 28 June 1968) was a prominent Australian performer of radio and stage, theatre impresario and teacher of elocution.

== Biography ==
He was born James Thomas Gibb, but adopted his mother's maiden name as his middle name, or as "Brunton Gibb" or "Brunton-Gibb" an optional double surname. He studied at Sydney High School and was to become a prominent member of their Old Boys' Union. He began his stage career entertaining troops as a member of the "Anzac Coves" (after a command performance at Buckingham Palace given royal assent to be called "Royal Anzac Coves"), after active service in Egypt, France and Flanders.

He studied elocution under Lawrence Campbell and continued to draw on his expertise while gaining credentials for judging. He founded his elocution school in 1920?, based in Paling's Building, Sydney, where he later formed the Brunton Gibb Players. From 1919 to 1939 he regularly gave popular recitals, commonly at St James' Hall in Phillip St., or King's Hall, Sydney, accompanied by performers such as Ethel Lang, Lindley Evans, Rosa Alba, Albert Goossens, Tom Lamond (tenor), Idwal Jenkins and Wilfrid Thomas.

He also supported rival schools run by Gladys Guest, S. Gordon Lavers, Zita Swales and Beth Powe. He organised music festivals and the first Auburn eisteddfod. He served as adjudicator at that and similar competitions at Kurri Kurri Taree Riverina Goulburn, Maitland, Toronto, New South Wales, Windsor, Queensland then major contests in Brisbane, Wellington, New Zealand Devonport, Tasmania and contributed to many charity fund-raisers and Anzac Day services.

During WWII he served as an amenities officer (initially as lieutenant then promoted to captain), organising tours for such entertainers as Gracie Fields He was an officer in the United Grand Lodge, a Masonic order, a competitive golfer, a competent singer, organist and piano accompanist. He was a member of the Sydney Savage Club, being elected president in 1946.

== Personal life ==
He married future radio star Ethel Lang, one of his pupils, in 1923. They frequently appeared on stage together.

They had a son Peter in 1924, a daughter (Judith) Wendy in 1925 a daughter Barbara Joan in 1927 and a son David in 1939. The whole family used "Brunton" as though it were part of their surname.

Peter and Wendy Brunton Gibb both excelled in elocution. Wendy appeared in the 1949 Charles Chauvel film Sons of Matthew, left for London and joined Dan O'Connor's British Commonwealth Players and in 1953 became Mrs Michael Benge.

Peter served with the RAAF during WWII and married in 1946.

Barbara was educated at Fort Street High School and worked as a radio and stage actress associated with Doris Fitton's Independent Theatre and Mercury Theatre under the name Barbara Brunton, marrying journalist Stuart Revill in 1952.

David became Professor of Anaesthetics and Intensive Care at UNSW in 2001. He is commemorated at Sydney High School by the David Brunton Gibb Prize for Soccer.

== Sources ==
- Library Of New South Wales website
- National Film and Sound Archive
