= Silo 15 =

- Directed by: John Alaimo
- Written by: Gregory Marton
- Starring: Jack Thompson
- Cinematography: Heinz Fenke
- Edited by: Brian Kavanagh
- Distributed by: Seven Keys
- Release dates: August 22, 1969 (Glebe, Sydney)
- Running time: 45 mins
- Country: Australia
- Language: English

Silo 15 is a 1969 Australian short feature. It was shot in 1969 and was produced by Grahame Jennings and directed by John Alaimo.

== Plot ==
In the 1990s, two men, Captain Thomson and Lt O'Donnell, are trapped in a nuclear missile silo with war looming. They receive an alarm and lose contact outside the silo. Thomson thinks they need to fire the missile.

== Cast ==
- Owen Weingott as Captain Thomson
- Jack Thompson as Lieutenant O'Donnell

== Production ==
The film was based on an original TV play by Mosman writer Gregory Marton which had first been conceived as a stage play. Marton had arrived in Australia from Hungary in 1949. In 1965 he sent the play to the ABC but did not hear back from them. He began negotiations with companies in Europe to make it and ask for it back.

The play won a Merit Award at the first Australian Writers Guild Awards in March 1968 and sold to West Germany for $1,000. The German version was shot in Hamburg and shown throughout Europe on German speaking networks, including in Switzerland and Austria. "Does the ABC remember it?" wrote Valda Marshall in the Sun Herald. "Will the ABC read it now??"

The Sydney Morning Herald wrote an article about this in 1968 prompting revived interest in the play. An Australian version was filmed in Sydney, produced by Grahame Jennings and directed by John Alaimo, who worked in advertising. Alaimo called the play "an absolute winner... I am astrounded it has never been produced here." Alaimo arranged for the production to be shot in colour and on film to help with overseas sales. "This is a powerful drama with a topical theme," said Alaimo. It was shot over nine days in a Sydney studio. Jack Thompson had one of his first roles.

== Release ==
Ad in Sydney Morning Herald 22 Aug 1969

By August 1969 the Australian version had been sold to the US (the National Educational Television Network), Canada and the BBC 2 but it had not been shown on Australian TV. It was broadcast on BBC Two, 2 September 1969, 21:10pm. Andrew Gaty reported he sold the drama through his company Seven Keys to the US, UK and Canada for $28,000.

To give it a wider audience, it was screened at the Gala Cinema in Sydney. Jennings said, "We feel that an important issue is at stake here, that a critical point has been reached in the production of drama by Australians for Australian television."

When the film aired in the cinema, the Sydney Morning Herald called it "tense, scary fare right out of The Twilight Zone and very much belongs to the small screen." The Bulletin said:

Seen on the cinema screen, it may seem a little pared-down one set, two characters, and a couple of off-screen voices but it makes its effect quite well... Gregory Marton in his reiterations and under- linings of his viewpoint gives his viewers too little credit for understanding. The message that man can create com- plicated and lethal machines but that only he can control them and that finally human values are the important ones is hardly a new one, but it can’t be stated too often; and with all its oversimplification this is a neatly constructed teleplay and efficiently produced.

In 1970 John Alaimo said "It has been shown to all commercial channels but either it's too far above them or they're just not interested in drama. It has me baffled... I certainly don't say that people should buy it but at least I think they should consider it. It's a complete enigma and has destroyed some of my faith in commercial television. I'm not saying that it's better than the programs we see on local television but is's certainly no worse."

The film screened again as a support feature in cinemas in Sydney in November 1970. In 1972 the show aired on ATN Sydney. "It's been a long wait but I finally made it," said Martin.

It was repeated on ATN in 1973 and 1974.

The same producer and director later made Odyssey: A Journey, a documentary drama, which aired in 1972.

Filmink said "It’s a very good television play, with two strong actors, and a compelling story; it sags a little in places, but the ending doesn’t sell out."
