= Captain Thunderbolt (film) =

1953 film by Cecil Holmes

- Poster
- Directed by: Cecil Holmes
- Written by: Creswick Jenkinson
- Produced by: John Wiltshire
- Starring: Grant Taylor; Charles Tingwell
- Cinematography: Ross Wood
- Edited by: Margaret Cardin
- Music by: Sydney John Kay
- Production company: Associated TV
- Distributed by: Ray Films
- Release date: July 1952 (Karlovy Vary)
- Running time: 69 minutes (53 minutes TV version)
- Country: Australia
- Language: English
- Budget: £15,000
- Box office: £30,000

Captain Thunderbolt is a 1952 Australian action film from director Cecil Holmes about the bushranger Captain Thunderbolt. It was one of the few all-Australian films of the 1950s.

== Synopsis ==
Fred Ward is imprisoned for horse stealing. He escapes from Cockatoo Island and under the name of Captain Thunderbolt becomes a bushranger in the New England region, working with his friend and fellow escapee Alan Blake. Blake has a romantic involvement with a Aboriginal girl Maggie that equally infringes the norms of the day.

Thunderbolt is tracked by the vengeful Trooper Mannix. After gunfights with the bushranger at a dance, then at a rocky outcrop, Mannix discovers that he has killed Alan Blake instead. Mannix passes off Blake's body as Thunderbolt, concealing the bushranger's escape. The legend grows that Thunderbolt did not die.

== Cast ==
- Grant Taylor as Captain Thunderbolt
- Charles Tingwell as Alan Blake
- Rosemary Miller as Joan
- Harp McGuire as Trooper Mannix
- John Fegan as Sergeant Dalton
- Jean Blue as Mrs Ward
- John Fernside as Colonel
- Loretta Boutmy as Maggie
- Ronald Whelan as Hogstone
- Charles Tasman as Colonial Secretary
- Harvey Adams as parliamentarian
- Patricia Hill as Belle
- John Brunskill as Judge

== Production ==
The budget was provided entirely by the son of theatrical entrepreneur Sir Benjamin Fuller.

It was a return to leading man roles for Grant Taylor.

Holmes scouted locations around Armidale in late January 1951.

The movie was shot in early 1951 on location in New England, New South Wales, and at the Royal National Park in Sydney, with studio work done in Supreme Sound System in North Sydney. The woolshed dance sequence was shot at a Pyrmont woolstore. One of Thunderbolt's robbery victims was played by Kathleen Drummond, daughter of the then-local MP David Drummond.

Filming started near Armidale on 5 March for ten days then the unit moved to Uralla. Taylor was accompanied by his wife during filming.

British censorship requirements meant that the real-life romantic relationship between Thunderbolt and his aboriginal girlfriend Mary, who helped him escape from Cockatoo Island, was not featured in the film when released in Britain. According to Filmink "Holmes was a bit of a lefty in real life, and he fashions the story so poor old Thunderbolt is a victim of the upper classes. Holmes was conservative enough, however, to remove Thunderbolt's aboriginal wife from the story entirely." Loretta Boutmy, a singer, plays the role in blackface.

Captain Thunderbolt was allowed to live at the end of the film because the producers hoped to spin it off into a TV series. (This did not happen.) Crewsick Jenkinson said the idea to write it that way came from his research which revealed that Frederic Britten died for Thunderbolt.

== Release ==
The film was meant to be released in August 1951. However it did not play in Melbourne or Sydney cinemas until late 1955. The Sydney Morning Herald called it "modest but enterprising" with "stagy dialogue scenes.

The film sold well overseas, including to American television.

53-minute TV edition in 16mm format of the film is in possession of the Australian National Film and Sound Archive. The missing full version was located in Prague in 2024 and obtained by NFSA. The Archive has published the Trailer originating from a 35mm print.

Filmink, reviewing the short version, felt it was "made with a lot of confidence – Holmes’ handling is very sure" and "has the feel of a 1930s/40s Warner Bros gangster movie – that’s praise not criticism – with a similar pace, sense of social justice, storyline about childhood friends growing up to be criminals/cops." The reviewer felt "the main debit of the truncated version... is the lack of characterisation" but that the movie "still contains plenty of action and flavour."
