= Margaret Cardin =

Margaret Cardin (1906–1998) was an Australian film editor and negative cutter, who worked on films such as Picnic at Hanging Rock (1975), the original Mad Max (1979) and the sequel, Mad Max 2: The Road Warrior(1981)

== Early years ==
Cardin was born in 1906 in London, to French parents. She attended school in England, being educated at a convent in London and she finished her schooling in France. Her mother died on the RMS Titanic, the liner that struck an iceberg in the Atlantic Ocean on its maiden voyage in 1912.

== Career in Britain ==
Cardin worked in the technical area of film-making before joining Movietone and Ealing studios in Britain. After a stage career, Maggie took up film jobs at Kay Film Laboratories and, later on, began free-lance editing in most studios in England. Her very first feature film to assist in was The Edge of the World (1937), a film about the evacuation of the Scottish archipelago of St. Kilda, for Michael Powell. She had worked with many well-known film personalities in England, including Carol Reed, Thorold Dickinson, Paul Rotha, John Taylor, Sydney Box, Havelock Allan, Ronnie Neane Wallis, Joe Rock, David Lean, Herbert Wilcox and Alfred Hitchcock.

In 1939, Cardin was working with the BBC as a TV film editor at Alexandra Palace in north London. During the war years, however, she was working as a film librarian. She was seconded for a year to the Dutch Government at Stratton House, to edit Glorious Colours, a propaganda film made in 1943. She was asked to edit this movie in both English and Dutch. Margaret left the BBC in 1945 and commenced the Cardin Film Service, working for I.C.I (Imperial Chemical Industries) and Shell.

== Career in Australia ==
Cardin arrived in Australia in 1951 but she had no intention on staying. She was soon, however, editing Captain Thunderbolt (1953), a film directed by Cecil Holmes about a bushranger of the same name. She also assisted the reputed ‘father of Australian documentary film’ John Heyer on what was his most successful film The Back of Beyond (1954). She also did some post-synchronizing for well-known film studio Pagewood and many short films as well.

Cardin joined the Australian Broadcasting Commission, (ABC) in 1956. In an interview, she said that Neil Hutchinson, who was the Head of Drama reached out to her. She commenced work with the ABC on 17 September 1956 and was the first editor to be employed by the ABC at its Gore Hill studios. One of her strengths, in particular, was negative cutting and she was showing other members of the film staff what to do and how to do it. The year of 1956 is also the company set up the Film Library, which are the archives of the ABC. While working with the ABC, she worked closely with John Crews (News Department), John Appleton (Head of Children's Programs) and Kay Kinnane (Head of Education). She did not go out in the field like the reporters did, but she would, instead, give advice to film cinecamera staff and others about putting together a film story.

Cardin left the ABC in 1959 after only working there for three years. In the same interview, she said: "I found that the ABC was a bit slow for me. Also I did not like the workplace politics that was there. I was just too impatient." The following year, in 1960, she established her own film editing business. After establishing her own business, she went on to the most successful period of her career, to work as a negative cutter on such films as Mad Max (1979), My Brilliant Career (1979) and Picnic at Hanging Rock (1975).
