= The Imaginary Invalid =

Comedy ballet by Molière

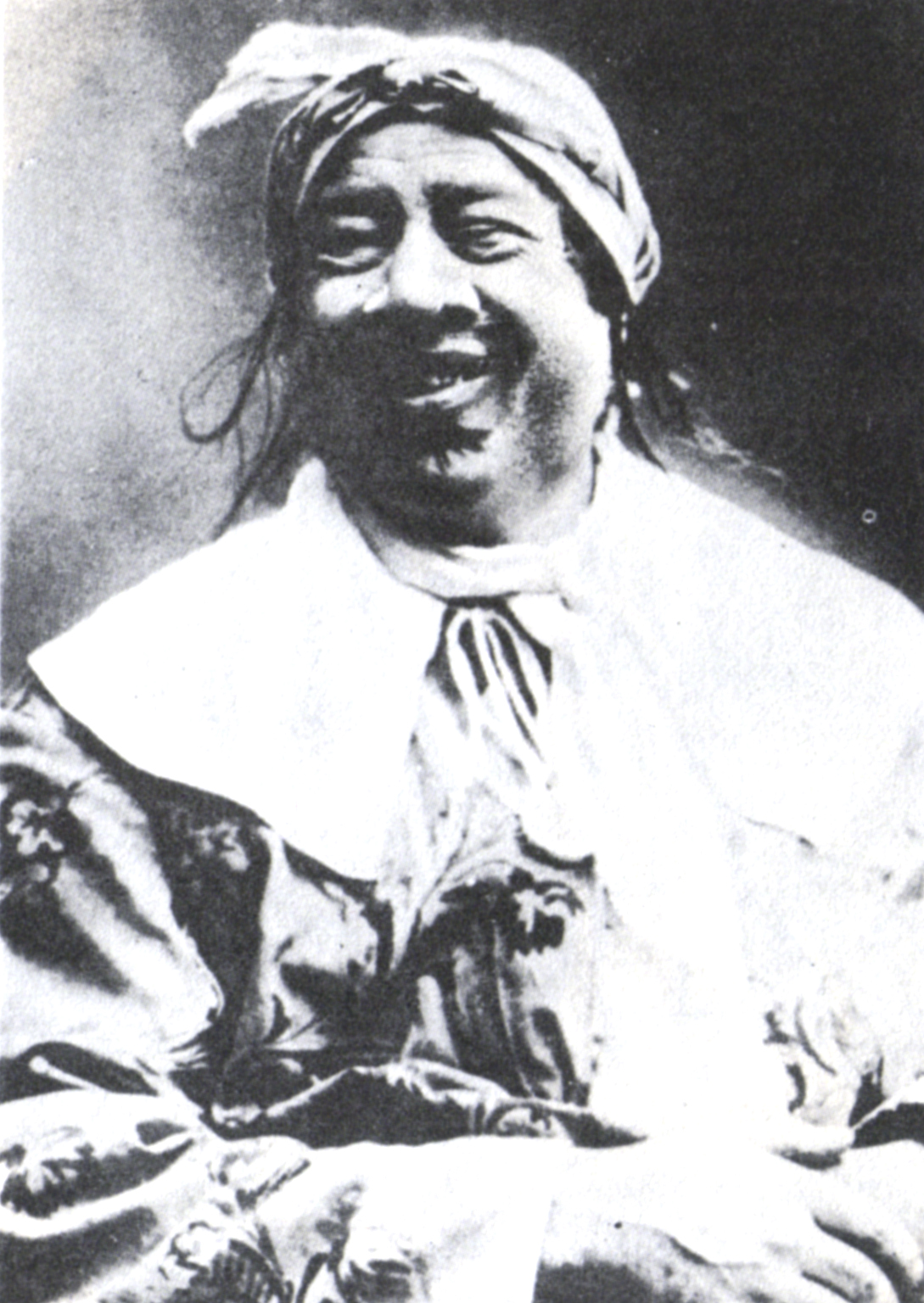
- Konstantin Stanislavski as Argan in the Moscow Art Theatre production in 1913.
- Original language: French
- Written by: Molière
- Genre: comédie-ballet

Premiere
- Date: 1673
- Place: Théâtre du Palais-Royal; Paris

The Imaginary Invalid, The Hypochondriac, or The Would-Be Invalid (French title Le Malade imaginaire, [lə malad imaʒinɛːʁ]) is a three-act comédie-ballet by the French playwright Molière with dance sequences and musical interludes (H.495, H.495 a, H.495 b) by Marc-Antoine Charpentier. It premiered on 10 February 1673 at the Théâtre du Palais-Royal in Paris and was originally choreographed by Pierre Beauchamp.

Molière had fallen out with the powerful court composer Jean-Baptiste Lully, with whom he had pioneered the comédie-ballet form a decade earlier, and had opted for the collaboration with Charpentier. Le malade imaginaire was Molière's last work. He collapsed during his fourth performance as Argan on 17 February and died soon after.

== Characters ==
- Argan, a severe hypochondriac.
- Toinette, witty maid-servant of Argan.
- Angélique, daughter of Argan, in love with Cléante.
- Béline, second wife of Argan.
- Cléante, lover of Angélique. Kind, but not very bright.
- Dr. Diafoirus, a physician.
- Thomas Diafoirus, his son, betrothed to Angelique by her father. Nephew of Dr. Purgon.
- Louison, Argan's young daughter, sister of Angélique.
- Béralde, brother of Argan.
- Dr. Purgon, physician to Argan, who exploits his hypochondria.
- Mr. Bonnefoy, a notary.

== Synopsis ==
=== Act 1 ===
The play opens with Argan, a severe hypochondriac, going through the bill from his apothecary (the pharmacist) item by item. He pays out only about half of what is on the bill. That done, he calls for his maid, Toinette. When she fails to appear immediately he shouts and calls her names until she arrives. Toinette is not interested in putting up with Argan's temper, so she mocks his rage. Eventually he gives up trying to scold her and asks her to call in his daughter, Angelique. Angelique is ready to talk to him, but Argan must leave the room for a short while (presumably the result of an "injection" [i.e., enema] he's just had).

While he is out, Angelique takes the opportunity to talk to Toinette. We quickly find out that she has been talking almost non-stop about the qualities of a young man named Cléante since she met him at a play six days ago. She expects Cléante to ask her father if he can marry her, within a few days.

Argan returns and expects to surprise his daughter when he tells her that someone has asked to marry her. He is shocked to find that she not only knows about it, but could not be happier. Unfortunately, Angelique thinks he's been talking about Cléante, while her father has promised his daughter to Thomas Diafoirus, the son of a respected Paris doctor who is soon to be made a doctor himself.

Toinette asks him why, with all his money, Argan would want a doctor for a son-in-law. He replies that since he is always ill, he thought it would be a good idea to have a doctor in the family. Then he could have Thomas Diafoirus's services as doctor all the time, not to mention the services of his father and his uncle for free. Toinette will not take his hypochondria seriously and tells him that she knows Angelique will never agree to that marriage. More than that, Toinette downright forbids the union to happen. This is amazing gall for a servant, and Argan becomes so incensed that he chases Toinette around the room threatening to kill her. Finally he stops, exhausted, and claims he is dying.

Hearing the disturbance, Argan's second wife Béline runs in. She soothes Argan, talking to him as one would to a child throwing a temper tantrum. Once his new wife has calmed him, Argan asks if she has contacted a notary; he intends to change his will to include (and heavily favour) Béline. She dramatically begs him not to think of such things, but just happens to have the notary to hand. Béline repeatedly claims that she doesn't care about the money, but double-checks the amounts all the same. The notary warns Argan that he can't leave his wife anything, but instructs him on several devious and underhanded methods whereby Béline could get all the money.

Meanwhile, outside the study, Toinette and Angelique have a chance to talk in private. Toinette warns Angelique that her stepmother is plotting to get her inheritance, but Angelique does not care, so long as she is allowed to marry as she wishes. She begs Toinette to help her foil her stepmother and father's plans, a proposition to which Toinette is only too delighted to agree. She also endeavors to find a way to tell Cléante of the intended marriage.

=== Act 2 ===
Cléante shows up in disguise at the door, surprising Toinette. He has come pretending to be a substitute for Angelique's music teacher so he can talk to her in private. However, when Argan learns of the "music master"'s arrival, he decides that he wants to watch the music lesson, spoiling everyone's plans. When Angelique comes in, she is shocked to find Cléante there, but manages to cover her reaction. Argan then invites Cléante to stay as a guest as Angelique is introduced to her fiancé, Thomas Diafoirus.

When Dr. Diafoirus and his son Thomas enter, Dr. Diafoirus tells Thomas to begin. Thomas asks if he should start with Argan and, once his father tells him to, he greets Argan with a florid prepared speech. Once finished, he asks his father if that was satisfactory and if he should continue. He has a fancy prepared speech ready for every member of the family.

Everyone has a seat and Argan praises Thomas. Dr. Diafoirus says that he is very pleased with his son. He says that as a child he was never very bright or exciting and he never has had any wit or liveliness, but he has sound judgement. What Dr. Diafoirus is most happy about in his son, though, is that he blindly adheres to the ancient medical beliefs and refuses to believe the new modern ideas like "circulation of the blood".

Argan asks if Thomas is to become a doctor for the rich at court. Diafoirus says he much prefers to treat the common people. He adds that with ordinary people he is less accountable to anybody and, as long as procedure is followed, there is no need to worry so much about the results; the rich are much more difficult since they actually seem to expect to be cured.

Argan then tells Cléante to help Angelique sing a song for the party. Cléante gives her a scroll of music with no words and tells everyone that it is a short piece from an improvised opera. Cléante then sings his love and his questions to Angelique in the guise of this opera. She answers him in the same form, telling him that she really loves him and despises the man her father wants her to marry. Their song continues until Argan stops it, thinking it dreadfully inappropriate. He sends Cléante away.

Argan tells Angelique to pledge herself to Thomas, but she refuses. She suggests that they ought to get to know each other first. Argan, however, disagrees. He says that there will be plenty of time for getting to know each other once they are married. As for Thomas, it is enough for him that his father has instructed him to be in love with her. Angelique tries to argue the point with him, but the arguing proves useless.

Argan gets angry with Angelique's willfulness and everyone's failure to pay attention to him during the fight. He tells Angelique that she has four days to decide. Either she marries Thomas, or she goes into a convent.

Angelique runs out and Béline decides to go to town for a while. Argan is left with the two doctors and begs them to examine him. It is very obvious they do not know what they are doing. However, they make up lies which are good enough to convince Argan the hypochondriac.

On her way out, Béline stops to tell Argan that she saw Angelique talking with a young man who ran away as soon as they were spotted. She tells him that his youngest daughter, Louison, saw everything. Argan calls Louison to him for an interrogation. After much coaxing and Louison faking her own death, she tells him that the man claiming to be Angelique's music teacher came to her window and told her over and over how he loved her.

Argan's brother, Béralde, who is a lawyer, comes to visit him. He is not convinced by Argan's claims about how sick he is. Béralde tells his brother that he has a match for Angelique. At the mention of his daughter's name, Argan flies into a rage and Béralde calms him by telling him about a dance troupe that has come to amuse him. There is a dance interlude as Gypsies dance and sing about the joys of young love and the pain when it proves false.

=== Act 3 ===
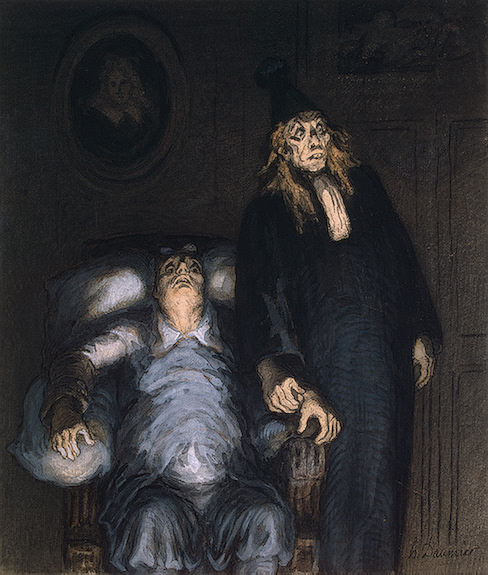
The Imaginary Invalid, drawing by Honoré Daumier, c. 1857.

Now that they have both enjoyed the interlude, Béralde wants to have a chat with his brother, but Argan insists he must take a short walk first (he's had another "injection"). Once Argan is gone, Toinette begs Béralde not to give up on helping his niece. He says that he will do everything he can. Toinette hints that she has a plan herself, but cannot tell what it is because her master has returned.

Now that Argan has returned, Béralde first asks his brother why he would want to send his daughter to a convent. Béralde points out that sending them to a convent was Béline's idea and suggests that she might want the children out of the way for her own reasons, but Argan gets angry and leaps to her defense. Then Béralde asks Argan why he would want to marry his daughter to a doctor so unsuited for her. Argan says that if the doctor is good enough for him, he is good enough for Angelique. Béralde wants to hear no more of this. He points out that Argan is one of the healthiest people he knows, and that Argan's infatuation with doctors and apothecaries is bad for him and everyone else. The doctors, he says, know nothing about the workings of the human body and therefore can do nothing to cure it. The doctors are only educated enough to give fancy Latin names to the things they do not comprehend. They will kill their patients with the best of intentions, but they will still be dead. Béralde believes that all one need do is rest and let nature take its course.

Mr. Fleurant, the apothecary and Purgon's assistant, comes in with a new remedy for Argan. Béralde asks Argan not to take the remedy and to put it off until tomorrow, but this makes Fleurant very angry and he storms off to tell Dr. Purgon about this interference. Béralde tries once again to get his brother to give up his addiction to doctors, but Argan claims to be too sick. Just then Dr. Purgon enters in a furious temper, having been told that his cure was sent back, and rages at Argan. He refuses to treat Argan any more and says that within a few days Argan will go from one horrible disease to another and finally die. With that, he storms out.

Left with Béralde again, Argan cries and says that he can already feel his system shutting down, just as Dr. Purgon had told him. Béralde thinks he is crazy and tells him so, but Argan won't listen. He is sure that he is already dying. Toinette comes in and says that a new doctor has arrived who wants to treat Argan. She doesn't know who the man is, but says that he looks exactly like her. Argan is desperate and consents to see him.

Toinette comes back in dressed as a doctor and claims to be one of the world's greatest doctors who has come to see Argan, one of the world's most illustrious patients. She tells Argan that all of his previous doctors were idiots who have totally misdiagnosed him. Argan tells him everything that has been prescribed, and Toinette (as the doctor) contradicts every one, saying his doctors were ignorant quacks. She goes on to make him realize that not everything doctors tell him is true; she blames his one arm for taking up all the nutrients, so he should have it amputated so as to make his other arm stronger. She also says that one of his eyes is taking up all the nutrients that go to it, so if he has it removed, his remaining eye will see much better. After spouting more of this medical nonsense, the "doctor" leaves and Toinette comes back on as herself, supposedly outraged that the departing "doctor" has been trying to take liberties with her (wanting to "take [her] pulse").

Béralde then tries to convince his brother that since he has already fallen out with Purgon, he should consider a different marriage for his daughter. But Argan wants her put into a convent as a punishment for her willfulness. Béralde suggests that the real reason is that Béline wants it. Argan begins to get angry again, but Toinette steps in and says she has a solution to prove to Béralde how much Béline loves her husband. She suggests that Argan lie down on the couch and pretend to be dead. Then everyone will see how she really feels about him by her grief. Everyone thinks this is an excellent plan.

Béralde hides as Béline comes in. She finds Toinette crying and Toinette tells her Argan is dead. Béline does not shed a tear, but is instead overjoyed that Argan is finally dead. She calls him many horrible names, then asks Toinette to help her cover up his death until she can get his money. With that, Argan gets up and surprises Béline. He shouts that he's glad to have found her out as she runs off. Just then they hear Angelique coming, and Toinette suggests he do the same thing to find out how she feels.

When Angelique hears that her father is dead, she is inconsolable. She cries and says that she has lost one of the dearest things in the world to her. She is even more upset because she has lost him when he was still angry with her. Cléante comes in to comfort her, but it is no good. She tells Cléante that they can never get married now; since her father's last wishes were that she be a nun, that is what she will do.

With that, Argan gets up and hugs his daughter. She and Cléante are both delighted that he is alive. Argan agrees to their marriage, saying that she and Cléante can marry... as long as Cléante becomes a doctor. He agrees, but Béralde stops him. He suggests that Argan should just become a doctor himself, since no disease would dare to attack a doctor. Argan approves of the idea and Béralde says he knows a number of members of the medical faculty who can make Argan a doctor that very night.

He invites the gypsy dancers back and they perform a ceremony in song and dance that, they claim, makes Argan a doctor. (In the translation by John Wood, Argan suffers a heart attack during the dance and dies, whereupon the dancers stop dancing and assume deaths-head masks.)

== Stage productions ==
- The first known Broadway production was performed at the Liberty Theatre in March 1917 with a translation by Katherine Prescott Wormeley.
- Le Malade Imaginaire was performed at the Stratford Festival in 1958, 1974 1993, and 2016.
- A 1948 Australian adapatation by Creswick Jenkinson was performed in a Sydney glass factory in front of Laurence Olivier and Vivien Leigh, helping launch Peter Finch's British career.
- The Hypochondriack, a translation into Scots by Victor Carin, was staged at the Gateway Theatre in Edinburgh in 1963, and produced at the Perth Theatre in 1977 and the Pitlochry Festival Theatre in 1991.
- The Imaginary Invalid was directed by János Nyíri at the Vaudeville Theatre in London's West End in 1968 with Richard Wordsworth as Argan.
- Another Broadway production was performed at the ANTA Playhouse 1–13 May 1967 with Denholm Elliott as Dr. Diafoirus.
- Théâtre du Chatelet with Les Arts Florissants; music-director, William Christie (1990); complete production using original/early sources, performing the dance sequences.
- James Magruder's translation/adaptation was staged by the Yale Repertory Theatre in 1999.
- The American Conservatory Theater (San Francisco) produced The Imaginary Invalid, an "adaptation" by Constance Congdon, directed by Ron Lagomarsino, in 2007.
- Theatre Spirits staged a Hindi adaptation of Le Malade imaginaire, titled Hardam Mareez, in September 2007 in the Shri Ram Centre for Performing Arts in Delhi, directed by Sanjeev Sharma.
- The Hypochondriac (a free adaptation of The Imaginary Invalid written by William Moreing) was presented at the Hope Summer Repertory Theater in Holland, Michigan during the summer of 2007, directed by Daina Robins.
- Le Malade Imaginaire directed by Vincent Tavernier performed at the Théâtre Graslin in Nantes, with the Concert spirituel; music-director, Hervé Niquet; choreographer, Marie-Geneviève Massé (2022); complete production using original/early sources, performing the dance sequences.
- Alliance Française de Nairobi under the Hii Stage Initiative staged a Kenyan adaptation, Mgonjwa Mwitu, written by Gadwill Odhiambo and directed by Stuart Nash, in October 2024. It also toured other cities like Mombasa, Kisumu and Eldoret.
- A new adaptation of The Imaginary Invalid, written by and starring Bill Irwin, directed by Brandon J. Dirden, and produced by Roundabout Theatre Company, started performance on Broadway at the Todd Haimes Theatre in fall 2026.

== Audio recordings ==
An hour-long version adapted by Richard MacDonald was broadcast on the NBC radio series Great Plays on 15 December 1940.

In 1998, the L.A. Theatre Works recorded and released a production (ISBN 978-1-58081-360-0) featuring an adaptation by Beth Miles (who also directed the production) based on the John Wood translation (without the tragic twist ending; see above) and performed by The Actors' Gang.

There is also a full, dramatized version (with music), directed by Yuri Rasovsky, included in Seven Classic Plays, an audiobook produced by Blackstone Audio.

== See also ==
- Charles Robert Leslie

== Bibliography ==
- Garreau, Joseph E. (1984). "Molière", vol. 3, pp. 397–418 in McGraw-Hill Encyclopedia of World Drama, Stanley Hochman, editor in chief. New York: McGraw-Hill. ISBN 9780070791695.
- Catherine Cessac, Marc-Antoine Charpentier, Fayard 2004, Molière et la Comédie-Française, chap. III p. 61-115
- Catherine Cessac, Marc-Antoine Charpentier, Musiques pour les comédies de Molière, édition scientifique CMBV 2019
