= Minnie Love =

Actress, producer, comedian, and singer (1888–1967)

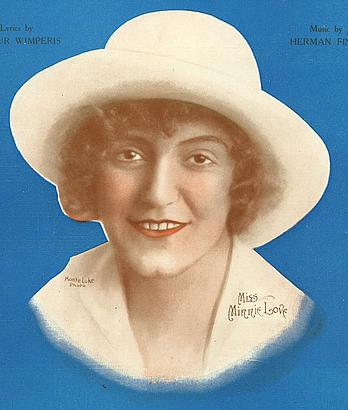
- Minnie Love, picture on the sheet music cover of "Ill Make a Man of You" published in 1914
- Born: Minnie Maude Monks; October 9, 1887; Fishponds, Stapleton, Somerset, England, United Kingdom
- Died: 2 August 1967 (aged 78–79); Coogee, New South Wales Australia
- Other names: Minnie Maude Pearce-Brown, Minnie Maude Cyril
- Occupations: Actress; producer; comedian; singer

Minnie Love (9 Oct 1887 – 2 August 1967) was an English-born actress, producer, comedian and singer.

== Biography ==
Love was born as Minnie Maude Monks, in Fishponds, Stapleton, Somerset, England, United Kingdom, the daughter of Jesse Monks and his wife Annie née Brown. She was the niece of Lilly Earnest the later named Lady Mansell.

In London in 1923 she married Charles Pearce-Brown. He also went by the name Herbert Cyril.

Having been discovered appearing in a vaudeville theatre in London at the age of 15, she was best known for her roles in musical comedies during the 1920s in her native country and in Australia. Appearing in plays Aladdin and Cinderella, she was best known for her role as The Pink Lady in play The Cinema Star and her song "The Broken Doll" as well as the play The Bing Boys and song "I'll Make a Man of You".

She came to Australia where she appeared in revue, variety and stage plays, as well as plays made for radio and television. She made her television debut in 1958, stating the new medium gave her the chance to indulge in her first love which was the theatre, noting also musical theatre had lost a lot of its former glamour in theatre venues since the early days of Irene Vanbrugh and Marie Tempest, and when performers were given bouquets at the end of performances by patrons.

Her TV debut was a role in R. C. Sheriffs' Miss Mabel opposite Walter Pym and had a role in the serial Blue Hills. As a performer she was also known for her impersonations of music hall performers including Dame Gracie Fields, Vesta Tilley and Marie Lloyd.

== Select credits ==
- A Tongue of Silver (1959)
