= Leeds Savage Club =

Non-profit organisation in Leeds

The Leeds Savage Club is a non-profit organisation in Leeds.

It was originally founded in 1898 and was closed around October 1912. In 2010, the club was reestablished.

== Original club ==
The club was established in 1898 by Edmund Bogg and Owen Bowen, Mark Senior, Percy Robinson, Edward Caldwell-Spruce, and J. H. Dodgson. The club was inspired by the London Savage Club, named after the poet Richard Savage but operated with its own set of rules and distinct procedures. The club had a Native American theme, with its leader referred to as the "Chief", the Secretary known as the "Scribe", the eight committee members called "Braves" and the members known as "Savages", there was a limit of 50 members allowed in the club.

The inaugural meeting took place on January 6, 1899, at Owen Bowen's studio on Cookridge Street. Edmund Bogg was elected as the first Chief, but he stepped down in 1908, after which it was decided that no Chief should serve for more than one year. Bogg was succeeded by Caldwell-Spruce for a year, followed by Owen Bowen the following year. Bogg was later honored with the title "T'Owd Chief" and named an honorary life member.

As the club declined, the last recorded meeting occurred in October 1912. However, when Bogg died in 1931, he was honored with a ceremony as chief.

=== List of chiefs ===
- Edmund Bogg (—1908)
- Edward Caldwell-Spruce (1908—1909)
- Owen Bowen (1909—1910)
