= Lloyd Berrell =

New Zealand actor (1926–1957)

Lloyd Berrell (13 February 1926 – 30 December 1957) was a New Zealand actor who played Reuben "Roo" Webber in the original Sydney production of Summer of the Seventeenth Doll. He worked extensively in Australian radio and theatre, appearing in a large portion of the films being shot locally at that time. He also starred in the original stage production of Sumner Locke Elliott's Rusty Bugles as well as numerous productions for the Mercury Theatre.

== Biography ==
Berrell was born in Wellington, New Zealand, and was an only child while his father was a doctor. His family moved to Australia when Berrell was a child, and he began acting on radio, appearing on The Youth Show. In this role, he performed a variety of acts and often worked as a compère.

Berrell received acclaim for playing the title role in the radio play Ned Kelly in 1942.

In 1944 Berrell was questioned by police for his role in disturbances in a strike by Actors Equity.

During World War II, he served in the Australian Broadcast Control Unit from 1944 to 1946. In 1945 he was in Sons of the Morning on stage at the New Theatre.

In 1948, Berrell had a key role in the long-running play Rusty Bugles. That year, he performed in A Pickwick Story for Mercury Mobile Players, a company originally established by Peter Finch.

By 1948 he earned over £1,000 a year, mostly in radio.

In 1950 he was in a production of Julius Caesar at the Independent Theatre alongside Rod Taylor. The following year he did Anna Christie for John Alden.

Berrell did voice over for the documentary Fighting Blood (1951). He was also in several plays at the Mercury Theatre in Sydney in 1952, including The Twins, Point of Departure, and The Happy Time.

In 1953 he won a Macquarie Award for best actor in a radio drama. He also took a lead role in the Australian radio version of "Tom Corbett Space Cadet" for Artransa in 1953, originally a U.S. TV and radio series between 1950 and 1955. Then, Berrell formed a short lived radio production company with James Workman, called Workman-Berrell Productions.

His last appearance on Australia radio was in 'The Closing Door'.

=== Films ===
Berrell featured in Byron Haskin's His Majesty O'Keefe (1954), shot in Fiji.

Berrell was cast as the villain in King of the Coral Sea (1954), a rare Australian financed feature of the time, then Haskin used him again in Long John Silver (1954), filmed in Australia.

He did the narration for Antarctic Voyage (1956).

=== Summer of the Seventeenth Doll ===
In 1956, Berrell achieved his greatest success when he was cast as 'Roo' in the Sydney production of Summer of the Seventeenth Doll. He toured with the production around the country for the Australian Elizabethan Theatre Trust.

Also for the Trust, Berrell was in The Relapse (1957) and Hamlet (1957, as Claudius), which both toured.

Berrell's last appearance was as a truck driver in The Shiralee (1957).

== Personal life ==
Berrell was married in 1946 but the marriage ended in 1948. Berrell tried to sue his ex-wife in an attempt to get her back, but lost the case when he admitted to have spanked his wife twice. Together, they had one child. The divorce came through in 1951.

His second marriage, to Betty, who was a fellow actor, was a happy one. According to a historian, "it was a successful marriage; Betty was good for Lloyd. He had been a hard worker and player. He drank heavily and ran himself into the ground. Betty had helped him turn his life around."

=== Death ===
Berrell died on 30 December 1957 while on board the French liner Caledonian which was off the north west coast of Africa and traveling to London. At the time of his death, he was 31 years old. News of his death did not reach Sydney until a fortnight later. The cause was initially thought to be flu. Then when Berrell's widow returned to Australia she said the cause was a heart attack, which he had ten days out of Guadeloupe. "He had a very strenuous tour with The Relapse over its eight months run," said Betty Berrell. "He wore heavy cloaks and padding for his role and I believe the strain was too much for him."

According to one writer, "December 30, 1957 is a day actors will always recall; the day a profession cried; everybody loved Berrell as he was one of the most respected people in the trade. He was known as someone who was fun to be with. Despite his youth, he challenged much older people in the craft of radio. Berrell was dynamic and his work was full of energy. “He had probably the best natural voice that this country had ever heard, a voice and personality that could create any character in radio."

== Filmography ==
Year	Title	Role	Notes
1952	I Found Joe Barton		
1954	His Majesty O'Keefe	Inifel	
1954	Return to Treasure Island	Minor Role	Uncredited
1954	King of the Coral Sea	Yusep	
1954	Long John Silver	Capt. Mendoza, 'El Toro'	
1957	The Shiralee	Slipery, Truck Driver	(final film role)

== Theatre credits ==
- Rusty Bugles by Sumner Locke Elliott – Independent Theatre, Sydney, 1948
- A Pickwick Story adapted by Creswick Jenkinson – Sydney Town Hall, 1948
- Julius Caesar by William Shakespeare – Independent Theatre, Sydney, 1950 – with Rod Taylor
- Anna Christie by Eugene O'Neill – John Alden Company, 1951 – with Lyndall Barbour, Lou Vernon
- The Twins by Plautus – Mercury Theatre, Sydney, 1952 – with Rod Taylor and Ruth Cracknell
- Point of Departure by Jean Anouilh – Mercury Theatre, Sydney, 1952 – with Alan White
- The Happy Time by Samuel A. Taylor – Mercury Theatre, Sydney, 1952 – with Rod Taylor
- Summer of the Seventeenth Doll by Ray Lawler – Elizabethan Theatre, Sydney, 1956
- Hamlet by William Shakespeare – Elizabethan Theatre Trust, Sydney, 1957
- The Relapse by John Vanbrugh – Elizabethan Theatre, Sydney, 1957 – with Zoe Caldwell
