= Sydney Savage Club =

Australian literary men's social club

Sydney Savage Club is, or was, a social club in Sydney, Australia, associated with the London Savage Club, named after the poet, Richard Savage, and was formed to bring together literary men connected with literature, the arts, sport or science.

== History ==
The first iteration of the Sydney club was founded in the 1880s as a meeting-place for artists and writers. Its meetings were called "corroborees". The club disbanded sometime in the 19th century.

The concept of the Savage Club was introduced to Sydney in 1930 by H. L. S Havyatt, a New Zealander, who organised receptions in Australia for the "kiwi" aviator Francis Chichester who had flown solo from Britain, narrowly beaten to the record by Bert Hinkler.

The Sydney Savage Club was formed, or re-formed, in 1934 under rules adopted from the London Club, and sponsored by the Kindred Clubs Association of New Zealand, where Savage Clubs were numerous. Havyatt was appointed chairman of the ways and means committee, with joint secretaries E. A. Richards and C. H. Dickinson. The first club meeting elected Havyatt as Chief Savage and E. A. Richards secretary.

Joe Collins was elected Chief Savage in 1936. Other members were Alfred Hill, violinist Lloyd Davies, Harry Julius, and Charles Bryant. James Brunton Gibb was Chief Savage in 1937. Lindley Evans was president in 1954.

The Sydney Savage Club was a strong supporter of Australian literature. In 1965 "Inky" Stephensen was given a standing ovation by an audience of Sydney Savages after a his long tirade against what he saw as the Australian pursuit of mediocrity.

== Other cities ==
Savage Clubs were formed in other Australian cities:

- The Adelaide Savage Club had a brief existence around 1885.
- The Melbourne Savage Club club was founded in 1894.
- The Perth club was founded in 1896. Dr. Harvey E. Astles (past president of the Melbourne club) was its first president.
