= The Adventures of Ellery Queen (radio program) =

1939-1948 radio detective program

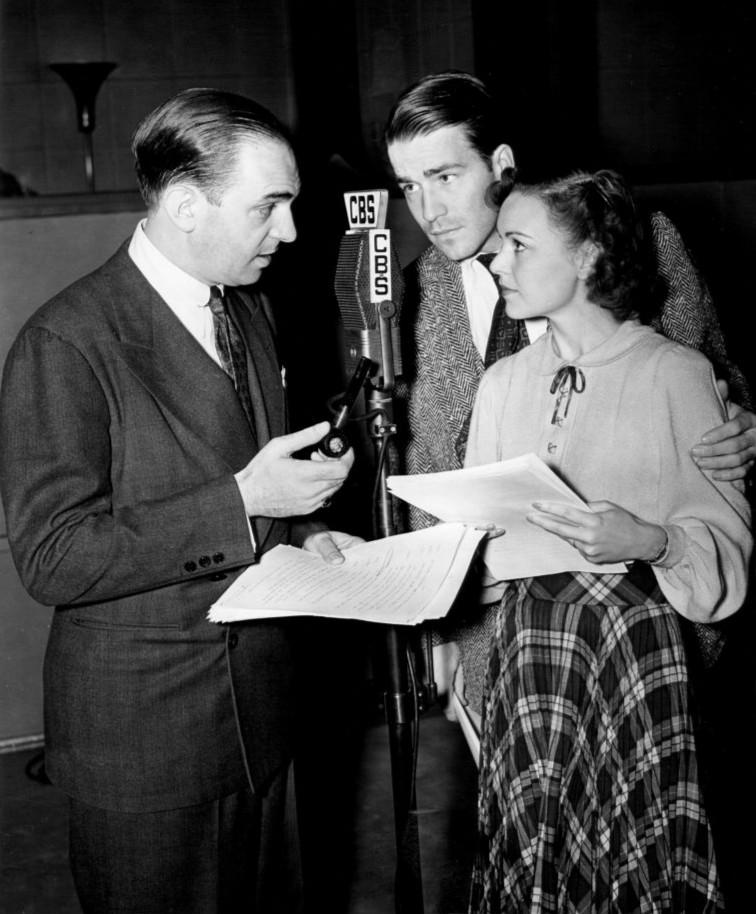
- From left: Santos Ortega as Richard Queen, Hugh Marlowe as Ellery Queen and Marian Shockley as Nikki Porter in 1939.
- Genre: Mystery fiction
- Running time: 1 hour for first 7 months 30 minutes thereafter
- Country of origin: United States
- Language: English
- Syndicates: CBS; NBC; ABC
- Starring: Hugh Marlowe; Carleton Young; Sydney Smith; Lawrence Dobkin; Howard Culver
- Announcer: Ken Roberts; Bert Parks; Ernest Chappell; Don Hancock; Paul Masterson
- Created by: Frederic Dannay and Manfred Lee
- Written by: Frederic Dannay; Manfred Lee; Anthony Boucher
- Directed by: George Zachary; Tom Victor; Dick Woolen; Dwight Hauser
- Produced by: George Zachary
- Original release: June 18, 1939 – May 27, 1948
- Sponsored by: Gulf Oil; Bromo Seltzer; Anacin

The Adventures of Ellery Queen was a radio detective program in the United States. Several iterations of the program appeared on different networks, with the first one broadcast on CBS on June 18, 1939, and the last on ABC on May 27, 1948.

The Adventures of Ellery Queen grew out of the combined efforts of producer-director George Zachary and writers Frederic Dannay and Manfred Lee. Dannay and Lee, who were cousins, originated the Ellery Queen character. Initially they wrote the program's scripts, and Zachary handled production. Beginning in 1945, Anthony Boucher replaced Dannay and worked with Lee writing scripts.

During the program's first season, Radio Guide magazine called it "a CBS drama that will keep you on the edge of your chair." It added "You will find Ellery Queen both brave and brilliant and you will find yourself participating joyously in the ageless thrill of the manhunt."

== Format ==
The Adventures of Ellery Queen invited a panel of armchair detectives to try to solve each case during its broadcast. Adapting a technique that had been used earlier in the Author! Author! radio program, when an episode's script reached a point at which all of the clues had been revealed, the scripted portion stopped, and the panel was challenged to identify the culprit.

Even with changes in networks, sponsors and stars, the basic format of the program remained constant throughout its time on the air. As listed on The Digital Deli Too website, the elements of each episode were as follows:

- The announcer would introduce the program and/or sponsor messages
- The guest 'armchair detectives' would be introduced and the title of the night's mystery would be given.
- The dramatized mystery would be presented to its conclusion.
- The armchair detective(s) would make their case for the mystery's solution.
- Ellery Queen would announce the actual resolution.
- The announcer and Ellery Queen would provide the closing sponsor message, tease and announce the title of the next week's mystery, and close with the credits.

Listeners were encouraged to follow the clues, drawing their own conclusions, and match wits with the panel and the detective himself. Jim Harmon described the situation in his book, "The Great Radio Heroes": "Ellery Queen's show was the detective program that gave you, the listener, a chance to join in on the fun and games. You were given all the clues, and you could solve the mystery – if you happened to be a deductive genius on the level of Ellery Queen."

The guest panelists were usually wrong in their solutions; in the program's first four months, only one panelist was correct. Yet such appearances were quite popular with celebrities. Trade magazine Billboard reported in a 1942 article, "In some cases an agent's entire list of performers eventually ask to get on 'prestige' shows like Information Please as guest experts, on Ellery Queen as guest armchair detectives". The number of panelists over the show's life has been estimated at more than 750.

== Characters and cast ==
Although the main characters in The Adventures of Ellery Queen remained consistent throughout its various incarnations on radio, the actors changed over the program's life. The primary characters and those who played each role were as follows:

- Ellery Queen – The title character "was a private detective without official police affiliation who was often called into cases by his father, a police inspector." Dunning commented, "Queen was portrayed throughout as a modern-day Sherlock with a fine eye for clues." He was played by Hugh Marlowe (1939–1940), Carleton Young (1942–43), Sydney Smith (1943–44, 1945–47), Lawrence Dobkin (1947–48) and Howard Culver (1948). The program's producers made a conscious effort to create a certain mystique about the character of Ellery Queen by not identifying the actors who portrayed him. An article on The Digital Deli Too website reported: "Hugh Marlowe ... remained cleverly unidentified as the voice of Ellery Queen. That gambit continued for the remainder of the various runs of the canon irrespective of the network or sponsor."
- Richard Queen – Ellery's father was a police inspector, played by Santos Ortega (1939–1947), Bill Smith (1947) and Herb Butterfield (1947–1948).
- Nikki Porter – A character who had not appeared in the Ellery Queen written material, Porter was added to the program "[i]n order to provide the mandatory 'love interest' that was supposed to attract the female audience." Described as "his comely, copper-haired secretary," she was played by Marion Shockley (1939–1944), Barbara Terrell (1945), Gertrude Warner (1945–46), Charlotte Keane (1946–47), Virginia Gregg (1947) and Kaye Brinker (1948). Two of the actresses wed key men in the production of the program. Shockley and producer-director George Zachary were married in 1939, and Brinker married Queen's co-creator Manfred Lee in 1942.
- Sergeant Velie – Inspector Queen's assistant, described by one researcher as "doughty", apparently did not have a first name in the radio program. He was played by Howard Smith (1939), Ted de Corsia (1939–47), Ed Latimer (1947) and Alan Reed (1947).

Announcers were Ken Roberts (1939–40), Bert Parks (1940), Ernest Chappell (1942–44), Don Hancock (1947), Paul Masterson (1947), and Roger Krupp The musical directors were Lyn Murray and Charles Paul.

== Broadcast history ==
Starting Date	Ending Date	Network	Sponsor/Notes
June 18, 1939	September 22, 1940	CBS	initially sustaining; (Note: "Sustaining" means the program had no sponsor.) then Gulf Oil
January 10, 1942	December 30, 1944	NBC	Bromo-Seltzer
January 24, 1945	April 16, 1947	CBS	Anacin
June 1, 1947	September 21, 1947	NBC	Anacin (summer replacement for The Bob Burns Show) (ran intermittently)
November 27, 1947	May 27, 1948	ABC	sustaining

== Recognition ==
In 1946, The Adventures of Ellery Queen and Mr. and Mrs. North received the first Best Radio Drama Edgar Award awards from the Mystery Writers of America.

== See also ==
- Ellery Queen for information about the Ellery Queen character
- Ellery Queen (TV series) for information about the 1975-76 NBC/Universal television series featuring the Ellery Queen character.
