= John Wiltshire (Australian actor) =

Australian actor and producer

John Wiltshire was an Australian actor and producer who worked extensively in stage, radio and television, notably at the ABC. He produced some of Noël Coward's shows in Australia in 1940, helped establish the Mercury Theatre in Sydney with Peter Finch and produced a number of films with Cecil Holmes including the feature Captain Thunderbolt (1953).

== Select credits ==
- Eureka Stockade (1949) – actor
- Terrific the Giant (1950) – short – producer
- Wherever She Goes (1951) – actor
- Captain Thunderbolt (1953) – producer
