= Sydney John Kay =

German-born composer, musician (1906–1970)

- Born: Kurt Kaiser; 3 November 1906; Leipzig, Germany
- Died: 24 May 1970 (aged 64)
- Occupations: Composer, musician, theatre entrepreneur

Kurt Kaiser (3 November 1906 – 24 May 1970), better known as Sydney John Kay, was a German-born composer, musician and theatre entrepreneur.

== Biography ==
=== Germany ===
Born in Leipzig, Germany of Peruvian-Jewish descent, he originally pursued an engineering career in Berlin, but in 1927 he joined the German-Jewish showband The Weintraub Syncopators as a musician. He appeared with them supporting Marlene Dietrich in The Blue Angel (1930). After the Nazis came to power in 1933, the Syncopators went on a world tour, and were in Sydney when war was declared.

=== Australian career ===
Kaiser was interned during the early days of the war, but was eventually released, changing his name in honour of his new home, Sydney. He became musical director for the Colgate-Palmolive radio unit, and was involved in theatre, running Sydney's Theatre for Children (1944–45) and co-founding the Mercury Theatre with Peter Finch. He produced the famous production of Molière's The Imaginary Invalid that was seen by Laurence Olivier and Vivien Leigh which led to them inviting Peter Finch to England.

Kay also composed for various Australian films, documentaries, orchestras and ballets.

=== Move to England ===
He then moved to England where he worked steadily in British film and television. He also composed for the stage.

== Selected credits ==
- The Blue Angel (1930) – musician
- Harvest Gold (1945) – composer
- A Son Is Born (1946) – composer
- Bush Christmas (1947) – composer
- Cavalcade of Australia (1951) - composer
- Captain Thunderbolt (1953) – composer
- The Back of Beyond (1954) – composer
- The Adventures of Long John Silver (1955) (TV series) – composer
- The Adventures of William Tell (1958) (TV series) – composer
