= Creswick Jenkinson =

Australian writer, producer and director

Crewick Jenkinson
- Born: Herbert Creswick Jenkinson; 14 April 1924; Carlton, Victoria, Australia
- Died: 22 July 2013 (aged 89)
- Occupations: Screenwriter, producer, director

Herbert Creswick Jenkinson (14 April 1924- 22 July 2013) was an Australian screenwriter, producer and director. As a screenwriter, he wrote the film Captain Thunderbolt (1953) as well as episodes of the TV series Skippy the Bush Kangaroo.

== Career ==
Jenkinson adapted a number of works for the stage, including the version of The Imaginary Invalid by Molière which was performed by Peter Finch and the Mercury Mobile Players in 1948. This production was seen by Laurence Olivier and Vivien Leigh and led to Olivier inviting Finch to Australia.

He also worked extensively in radio, including as producer and writer on The Black Museum radio series starring Orson Welles, creator of the drama series Address Unknown, and as a producer for the radio program AM.

Jenkinson was born in Carlton, Victoria andserved in the Australian Navy as a steward from 1942 until 1946.

== Select credits ==
- Imaginary Invalid (1948)
- The Pickwick Papers (1948) – play
- Willow Bend (1951) – radio serial
- Captain Thunderbolt (1953) - film script
- Too Young to Die (1963) – radio serial
- Australian Playhouse - "Haywire" (1966) - TV script
- Skippy (1967) - various episodes
- Motel (1968) - various episodes
