= John Alden (theatre) =

Australian actor, manager and director

- Born: Gordon Henry Buchanan; 19 January 1908; Taree, New South Wales, Australia
- Died: 10 November 1962 (aged 54); Mosman, New South Wales, Australia
- Occupations: Actor; manager; director; theatre founder
- Known for: Founder of the John Alden Shakespeare Company

John Alden, born Gordon Henry Buchanan, (19 January 1908 – 10 November 1962) was an Australian radio and theatrical actor, manager and director noted for his interpretation of Shakespeare and as the founder of the John Alden Shakespeare Company.

== Biography ==
Alden was born and grew up in Taree, New South Wales, the third son of George Nathaniel Buchanan and Elizabeth Malina Buchanan (née Lee) and was a great-nephew of drover and explorer Nathaniel "Nat" Buchanan and miner and grazier William Henry. He studied to be a teacher in Sydney. In 1934 he joined Doris Fitton's Independent Theatre, and in 1937 retired from teaching to concentrate on acting. He played with Independent in most of their productions at the Savoy Theatre or their own hall at 360 Miller Street, Sydney then as producer or assistant to Doris Fitton.

He spent three years working in England, including some performances at the Old Vic. From 1943 he directed Shakespeare productions at the Theatre Royal for J. C. Williamson's Austral-American Productions. He then took a group to Japan to entertain the Occupation Forces. On his return, he acted in or produced several plays at the Independent Theatre, including a 1959 production of A Midsummer Night's Dream. Berry Dunston, as Berenice Adams, was a member of the cast, playing "Moth" and was an understudy for the role of "Titania".

He was a foundation member of the "Radio Players" whose first production The Vinegar Tree opened at Bryant's Playhouse in 1946 to lukewarm reviews, but had a long season, and the second production, Max Catto's They Walk Alone with Lyndall Barbour and Therese Desmond (wife of Edward Howell was a triumph.

He then formed his own Shakespeare company which in 1951–52 embarked on a national tour, playing major parts as well as producing.

He had a heart attack in 1955 and appeared in early Australian TV plays.

In 1959 he was sponsored by J. C. Williamson in a national Shakespeare tour with Scottish actor John Laurie playing Lear and Shylock alternately with him.

In 1961 he helped organise the Sydney Shakespeare Festival. He died in 1962, from a coronary occlusion.

== Sources ==
- Australian Dictionary of Biography, online
