= Carden (surname) =

Carden is a surname. Notable people with the surname include:

- Alan Douglas Carden (1874–1964), English soldier in the Royal Engineers, pioneer aviator
- Billy Carden (1924–2004), American NASCAR driver
- Cap R. Carden (1866–1935), American politician
- Carden Gillenwater (1918–2000), baseball player
- D’Arcy Carden (born 1980), American actress
- Dan Carden (born 1986), British politician
- David L. Carden, American diplomat and attorney
- Frank S. Carden, American attorney and politician from Tennessee
- George Frederick Carden (1798–1874), English barrister, magazine editor and businessman, founder of Kensal Green Cemetery
- Henry Carden (1882–1964), English priest, Archdeacon of Lahore
- Joan Carden (born 1937), Australian operatic soprano
- Sir John Carden, 6th Baronet (1892–1935), English tank and vehicle designer
- John Carden (baseball) (1921–1949), baseball pitcher
- John Surman Carden (1771–1858), British Royal Navy officer
- John Carden (soccer) (1931–1997), American soccer player
- Sir Lionel Carden (1851–1915), British ambassador
- Macky Carden (born 1944), American football coach
- Mae Carden (1894–1977), American educator
- Mike Carden, member of American rock band The Academy Is...
- Paul Carden (born 1979), English football player and coach
- Sir Robert Carden (1801–1888), British banker and politician
- Sir Sackville Carden (1857–1930), Royal Navy admiral
- Shane Carden (born 1991), American football player
- William Carden (disambiguation)

== See also ==
- Cardan (disambiguation)
- Cardin, surname
