= Carden =

Carden may refer to:

== History ==
The estate of Carden first appeared in records associated with the family of Martyne in 1482 when King James 4 confirmed a charter by the deceased John Martyne of Medhope, Linlithgowshire to his son, Henry, of the lands of Cardwan, in the Constabulary of Kinghorn.It remained in that family until the death of Andrew Martyne without issue in 1549. No heir entered into possession for 50 years.In 1582, James 6 granted the lands of Carden to George Mertyne who claimed it through his mother, one of the Duries of that ilk. George Mertyne appears to have been the last of that family in Carden.In 1623 David Wemyss was served heir to his father, Duncan Wemyss, in the lands and Barony of Carden .

== Other uses ==
- Carden (surname)
- Carden (First Name)
- Carden Aero Engines, a British aircraft engine manufacturer
- Carden (cyclecar), a British 4 wheeled cyclecar made from 1914 by Carden Engineering
- Carden Hall
- Carden Loyd tankette, a series of British pre-World War II tankettes
- Carden Method, an educational system founded by Mae Carden

== See also ==
- Cardan (disambiguation)
- Carden House (disambiguation)
