= Cardin =

Cardin is a surname.

A branch of a family called Cardin then Cardim in Portugal proceeds from England, from where came Rubel or Robert Cardin then Roberto Cardim, whom it is supposed to have been part of the entourage of Queen Philippa of Lancaster, wife of John I of Portugal. He married in Portugal with Joana Fernandes, daughter of António Fernandes Menage, as understands Diogo Rangel, of which matrimony came the ones of the surname Cardim. They are their arms the following: or, a thistle flowered vert; crest: a lion or, with a thistle green in the claws.

Notable people with the surname include:

- Alberto Cardín (1948–1992), Spanish essayist and anthropologist
- Annie Cardin (born 1938), French artist
- Arthur Cardin (1879–1946), Canadian politician
- Ben Cardin (born 1943), American politician from Maryland
- Charlotte Cardin (born 1994), Canadian pop singer
- Claude Cardin (born 1941), Canadian ice hockey player
- Denny Cardin (born 1988), Italian footballer
- Jessica Cardin, American neuroscientist
- Jon S. Cardin (born 1970), American politician, nephew of Ben
- Louis-Pierre-Paul Cardin (1840–1917), Canadian politician
- Lucien Cardin (1919–1988), Canadian lawyer, judge and politician
- Margaret Cardin (1906–1998), Australian film editor
- Maurice Cardin (1909–2009), American politician
- Meyer Cardin (1907–2005), American judge, father of Ben
- Nina Beth Cardin, American rabbi and author
- Pierre Cardin (1922–2020), Italian/French fashion designer
- Sara Cardin, (born 1987), Italian karateka
- Serge Cardin (born 1950), Canadian politician

== See also ==
- Cardin, Oklahoma, a ghost town
- Colisée Cardin, an indoor arena in Quebec, Canada
