= Terry Tempest Williams =

American writer (born 1955)

- Born: September 8, 1955 (age 71); Corona, California, U.S.
- Education: University of Utah (BA, MSc)
- Occupations: Author, educator
- Spouse: Brooke Williams (m. 1975)
- Writing career
- Language: English
- Years active: 1985–present
- Subjects: ecology wilderness preservation women's health LDS Church

Terry Tempest Williams (born September 8, 1955) is an American writer, educator, conservationist, and activist. Williams' writing is rooted in the American West and has been significantly influenced by the arid landscape of Utah. Her work focuses on social and environmental justice ranging from issues of ecology and the protection of public lands and wildness, to women's health, to exploring humanity's relationship to culture and nature. She writes in the genre of creative nonfiction and the lyrical essay.

== Early life, education, and work ==
Williams was born in Corona, California, to Diane Dixon Tempest and John Henry Tempest, III. Her father served in the United States Air Force in Riverside, California, for two years. She grew up in Salt Lake City, Utah, within sight of Great Salt Lake.

Atomic testing at the Nevada Test Site (outside Las Vegas) between 1951 and 1962 exposed Williams' family to radiation, like many Utahns (especially those living in the southern part of the state), which Williams believes is the reason so many members of her family have been affected by cancer. By 1994, nine members of the Tempest family had had mastectomies, and seven had died of cancer. Some of the family members affected by cancer included Williams' own mother, grandmother, and brother.

Williams met her husband Brooke Williams in 1974 while working part-time at a Salt Lake City bookstore, where he was a customer. The two married six months after their first meeting. They both went on to teach at Teton Science School in Grand Teton National Park.

In 1976 Williams was hired to teach science at Carden School of Salt Lake City (since renamed Carden Memorial School). She often clashed with the conservative couple that led the school over her unorthodox teaching methods and environmental politics, but she respected their gift of teaching through storytelling and prized her five years there. "Teaching helped me find my voice," she later wrote. "The challenge was to impart large ecological concepts to young burgeoning minds in a language that wasn't polemical, but woven into a compelling story."

In 1978, Williams graduated from the University of Utah with a degree in English and a minor in biology, followed by a Master of Science degree in environmental education in 1984. After graduating from college, Williams worked as a teacher in Montezuma Creek, Utah, in the Navajo Nation. She worked at the Utah Museum of Natural History from 1986–96, first as curator of education and later as naturalist-in-residence.

Williams has testified before Congress on women's health. She has committed acts of civil disobedience in the years 1987–1992 in protest against nuclear testing in the Nevada Desert, and again, in March 2003 in Washington, D.C., with Code Pink, against the Iraq War. She has been a guest at the White House, has camped in the remote regions of the Utah and Alaska wildernesses and worked as "a barefoot artist" in Rwanda. Williams was featured Stephen Ives's PBS documentary series The West (1996) and in Ken Burns' PBS series The National Parks: America's Best Idea (2009).

In 2003, the University of Utah awarded Williams an honorary doctorate. That year she also co-founded the University's Environmental Humanities master's degree program, where she taught for thirteen years and was the Annie Clark Tanner Teaching Fellow.

In February 2016, officials at the University of Utah approached Williams about contract revisions, days after she and her husband successfully bid on an oil and natural gas lease for 1,120 acres of land near their home in Castle Valley, Utah to protest federal energy policies in what Williams described as environmentally sensitive areas of Utah. According to Brian Maffley of The Salt Lake Tribune, the Williams' "gesture ... angered Utah's political brokers". The University denied the contract issue was related to the oil and gas lease or Williams' other activism, stating the goal was to (as summarized by Maffley) "align the terms of her employment with university human resources and travel guideline". Nevertheless in an April 25, 2016, letter to the University's associate vice president for faculty she wrote: "My fear is that universities, now under increased pressure to raise money, are being led by corporate managers rather than innovative educators." Williams resigned from the University of Utah in late April 2016, after six weeks of contract negotiations she described as "humiliating". The main point of contention was Williams's practice of taking students into isolated wilderness areas for extended periods, which University officials said exposed the school to significant financial liability and caused "resentment" among students who preferred to not travel.

After leaving the University of Utah, Williams became a Writer-in-Residence at the Harvard Divinity School. She teaches several courses, including "Finding Beauty in a Broken World" and "Apocalyptic Grief and Radical Joy." She is working with the Planetary health Alliance and the Center for the Study of World Religions in establishing The Constellation Project, where the sciences and spirituality are conjoined. She has been a Montgomery Fellow at Dartmouth College where she served as the Provostial Scholar from 2011 to 2017. She divides her time between Castle Valley, Utah, and Cambridge, Massachusetts.

== Writing career ==
Williams published her first book, The Secret Language of Snow, in 1984. A children’s book written with Ted Major, her mentor at the Teton Science School, it received a National Science Foundation Book Award. Over the next few years, she published three other books: Pieces of White Shell: A Journey to Navajo Land (1984, illustrated by Clifford Brycelea, a Navajo artist); Between Cattails (1985, illustrated by Peter Parnall); and Coyote’s Canyon, (1989, with photographs by John Telford).

In 1991, Williams' memoir, Refuge: An Unnatural History of Family and Place was published by Pantheon Books. The book interweaves memoir and natural history, explores her complicated relationship to Mormonism, and recounts her mother's diagnosis with ovarian cancer along with the concurrent flooding of the Bear River Migratory Bird Refuge, a place special to Williams since childhood. The book's widely anthologized epilogue, The Clan of One-Breasted Women, explores whether the high incidence of cancer in her family might be due to their status as downwinders during the U.S. Atomic Energy Commission's above-ground nuclear testing in the 1950s and 60s. Refuge received the 1991 Evans Biography Award from the Mountain West Center for Regional Studies at Utah State University. and the Mountain & Plains Booksellers' Reading the West Book Award for creative nonfiction in 1992.

In 1995, when the United States Congress was debating issues related to the Utah wilderness, Williams and writer Stephen Trimble edited the collection, Testimony: Writers Speak On Behalf of Utah Wilderness, an effort by twenty American writers to sway public policy. A copy of the book was given to every member of Congress. On 18 September 1996, President Bill Clinton at the dedication of the new Grand Staircase–Escalante National Monument, held up this book and said, "This made a difference."

Williams' writing on ecological and social issues has appeared in The New Yorker; The New York Times; Orion magazine; and The Progressive. She has been published in numerous environmental, feminist, political, and literary anthologies. She has also collaborated in the creation of fine art books with photographers Emmet Gowin, Richard Misrach, Debra Bloomfield, Meridel Rubenstein, Rosalie Winard, Edward Riddell, and Fazal Sheikh.

Williams was elected to the American Academy of Arts and Letters in 2019.

== Activism ==
Williams wrote and spoke about the impact of the BP oil spill.

On 13 June 2014, Williams posted an open letter to the leadership of the Church of Jesus Christ of Latter-day Saints expressing "solidarity with Kate Kelly and her plea to grant women equal standing in the rights, responsibilities and privileges of the [LDS Church], including the right to hold the Priesthood."

On February 18, 2016, as part of the Keep It in the Ground movement, Williams attended a federal auction of oil and gas leases and purchased several parcels totaling 1,751 acres in Grand County, Utah through a company she formed called Tempest Exploration in order to protect them from energy development.

On October 1, 2025, Williams attended and spoke at a rally and news conference held by the Center for Biological Diversity, supporting their intent to sue the federal government for a violation of the Endangered Species Act concerning the threatened status of the Wilson's phalarope.

== Affiliations ==
- Governing Council of The Wilderness Society (1989–1993)
- President's Council for Sustainable Development, western team member (1994–1995)
- National Parks and Conservation Association, advisory board member
- Center for Biological Diversity, board of directors member
- Round River Conservation Studies, board member
- The Nature Conservancy — Utah Chapter
- Southern Utah Wilderness Alliance (1985–present)
- Thoreau Society, honorary advisor
- American Academy of Arts and Letters (2019–present)

== Honors and awards ==
- 1993 National Wildlife Federation's Conservation Award for Special Achievement
- 1995 Utah Governor's Award in the Humanities
- 1996 Inducted into the Rachel Carson Honor Roll
- 1997 John Simon Guggenheim Memorial Foundation Fellow
- 2004 One of the "Utne Reader's" "Utne 100 Visionaries"
- 1997 Association for Mormon Letters Lifetime Achievement Award
- 1999 Honorary Degree, College of the Atlantic, Bar Harbor, Maine
- 2000 Honorary Degree, Chatham College, Pittsburgh, Pennsylvania
- 2002 Honorary Doctor of Humanities, Utah State University, Logan, Utah
- 2003 Honorary Doctor of Humanities, University of Utah, Salt Lake City, Utah
- 2004 Honorary Doctor of Humane Letters, Saint Mary-of-the-Woods College
- 2005 Wallace Stegner Award for the Center for the American West, 2005
- 2006 Distinguished Achievement Award from the Western American Literature Association
- 2006 Robert Marshall Award from The Wilderness Society
- 2008 Honorary Doctor of Humane Letters, Lesley University, Cambridge, Massachusetts
- 2008 John Wesley Powell Award, The Grand Canyon Trust
- 2008 Spirit of the Arctic Award, Alaska Wilderness League
- 2010 Honorary Doctor of Humanities, Wooster College, Wooster, Ohio
- 2011 International Peace Award, Community of Christ Church, 2011
- 2013 Robin W. Winks Award for Enhancing Public Understanding of National Parks, National Parks Conservation Association
- 2014 Sierra Club John Muir Award
- 2019 Robert Kirsch Award
- Lannan Literary Fellowship in Creative Nonfiction
- Lila Wallace-Reader's Digest Community Literary Grant
- Hemingway Foundation Literary Grant

== Book awards ==
- New York Academy of Sciences, Children's Science Book Award, 1984, The Secret Language of Snow
- Southwest Book Award, 1985, Pieces of White Shell
- Association for Mormon Letters, Personal Essay Award, 1991, Refuge: An Unnatural History of Family and Place
- Evans Biography Award, Mountain West Center for Regional Studies, Utah State University, 1991, Refuge
- Mountain & Plains Booksellers, Creative Nonfiction Award, 1992, Refuge
- Association for Mormon Letters, Personal Essay Award, 1995 Desert Quartet
- Utah Book Award, Nonfiction, 2000, Leap
- Mountain & Plains Booksellers, Children’s Picture Book Award, 2009, The Illuminated Desert

== Works ==
=== Books ===
- The Secret Language of Snow (for children; co-authored with Ted Major, illustrations by Jennifer Dewey), Sierra Club/Pantheon Books, 1984, ISBN 039486574X.
- Pieces of White Shell: A Journey to Navajoland (illustrations by Clifford Brycelea), Charles Scribner's Sons, New York, 1984, ISBN 0826309690.
- Coyote's Canyon (photographs by John Telford), Peregrine Smith, Layton, Utah, 1989, ISBN 0879052457.
- Refuge: An Unnatural History of Family and Place, Pantheon Books, New York, 1991, ISBN 0-679-74024-4.
- Leap, Pantheon Books, New York, 2000, ISBN 0679752579.
- Red: Passion and Patience in the Desert, Pantheon Books, New York, 2001, ISBN 0375725180.
- Finding Beauty In A Broken World, Pantheon Books, New York, 2008, ISBN 0375725199.
- When Women Were Birds: Fifty-four Variations on Voice, Sarah Crichton Books, New York, 2012, ISBN 1250024110.
- The Hour of Land: A Personal Topography of America's National Parks, FSG, New York, 2015. Sarah Crichton Books/Farrar, Straus and Giroux, New York, 2016, ISBN 0374280096
- Erosion, Picador Paper, 2020, ISBN 978-1250758248
- The Moon Is Behind Us (photographs by Fazal Sheikh), Steidl, Goettingen, 2021, ISBN 978-3958298804
- The Glorians: Visitations from the Holy Ordinary , Grove Atlantic, 2026, ISBN 9780802165848

=== Poetry collections ===
- Between Cattails (for children), Little, Brown, Boston, 1985, ISBN 0684183099.
- Earthly Messengers (with illustrations by Hal Douglas Himes), Western Slope Press, Provo, Utah, 1989.
- The Illuminated Desert (for children; with art by Chloe Hedden, calligraphy by Chris Montague), Canyonlands Natural History Association, 2008, ISBN 0937407119.

=== Essay collections ===
- An Unspoken Hunger: Stories from the Field, Pantheon Books, New York, 1994, ISBN 0679752560.
- Desert Quartet: An Erotic Landscape, (with art by Mary Frank), Pantheon Books, New York, 1995, ISBN 0679439994.
- Red: Passion and Patience in the Desert, Pantheon Books, New York, 2001, ISBN 0375725180.
- The Open Space of Democracy, Orion Society Books, Great Barrington, Mass, 2004. Reissued by Wipf & Stock Publishers, 2010, ISBN 160899208X.
- Erosion, Farrar, Straus and Giroux, New York, 2019, ISBN 9780374280062.

=== As editor ===
- Great and Peculiar Beauty: A Utah Centennial Reader (edited with Thomas J. Lyon), Peregrine Smith, Layton, Utah 1995, ISBN 0879056916.
- Testimony: Writers in Defense of the Wilderness (compiled with Stephen Trimble), Milkweed Editions, Minneapolis, 1996, ISBN 1571312129.
- New Genesis: A Mormon Reader on Land and Community (edited with William B. Smart and Gibbs M. Smith), Peregrine Smith, Layton, Utah, 1998, ISBN 0879058439.
