= Fazal Sheikh =

American photographer (born 1965)

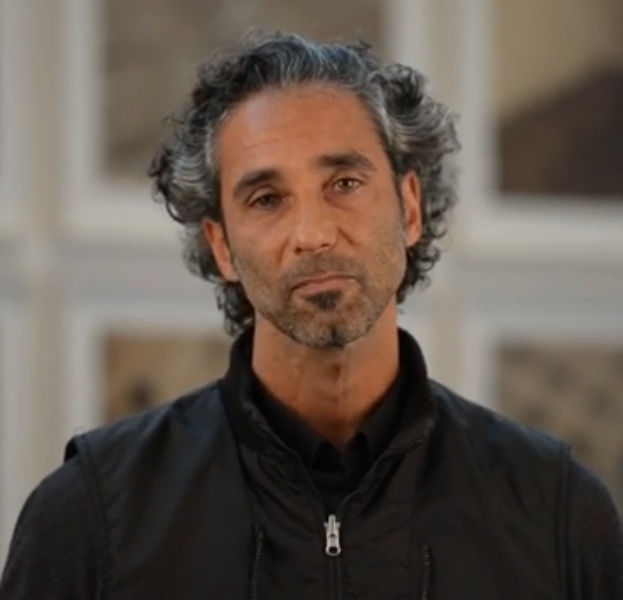
- In a Brooklyn Museum video in 2016
- Born: June 27, 1965 (age 61); New York City, US
- Education: Princeton University
- Occupations: Contemporary artist, photographer, bookmaker
- Known for: MacArthur Fellows Program, Guggenheim Fellowship, Infinity Award
- Notable work: The Erasure Trilogy, Ether, Moksha, Ladli, The Victor Weeps, A Sense of Common Ground, A Camel for the Son
- Website: www.fazalsheikh.org

Fazal Sheikh (born June 27, 1965) is an artist who uses photographs to document people living in displaced and marginalized communities around the world.

== Life and career ==
Fazal Sheikh is an artist who uses photographs to document people living in displaced and marginalized communities around the world. His principle medium is the portrait, although his work also encompasses personal narratives, found photographs, archival material, sound, and his own written texts. He works from the conviction that a portrait is, as far as possible, an act of mutual engagement, and only through a long-term commitment to a place and to a community can a meaningful series of photographs be made. His overall aim is to contribute to a wider understanding of these groups, to respect them as individuals and to counter the ignorance and prejudice that often attaches to them.

Frequently collaborating with local communities around the world, Sheikh has engaged long-term projects in Africa, Afghanistan, India, and in Israel/Palestine. As part of his practice, and in order to create a dialogue surrounding substantive human rights issue, Sheikh offers most of his projects online free of charge.

Fazal Sheikh was born in New York City, 1965, and attended Princeton University, graduating in 1987. Sheikh's work first came to prominence with his work in the Rwandan, Sudanese, Ethiopian, Somali, and Mozambican refugee camps of his father's homeland, Kenya, and throughout eastern and southern Africa. Early exhibitions from his first monograph, A Sense of Common Ground, were held in New York City at the International Center of Photography and Pace/MacGill Gallery. His second long-term project, The Victor Weeps, explored the legacy of war in Afghanistan as Sheikh followed the trajectory of his family heritage back to the lands in northern India where his grandfather was born, and from where he would later migrate to Kenya at a time before the partition of India in 1947, when the region would become Pakistan.

In the following years, exhibitions were held internationally at venues which include Tate Modern, where his work was included in the landmark "Cruel and Tender" survey exhibition of 20th century photography which traveled to the Museum Lugwig, Cologne, Germany (2003). Sheikh's work has been exhibited in solo exhibitions at the Fotomuseum Winterthur, the Henri Cartier-Bresson Foundation, Paris, which awarded him the Henri Cartier-Bresson Grand Prize in 2005, the Sprengel Museum, Germany, and the Nelson-Atkins Museum of Art. In 2008 Sheikh's work was included in Okwui Enwezor's, Archive Fever: Uses of the Document in Contemporary Art exhibition at the International Center of Photography in New York City.

In 2009 the Mapfre Foundation, Spain, organized a mid-career retrospective and publication that opened in Madrid and traveled to the Huis Marseille, Amsterdam; the Museum of Art, Bogota; and Sala Rekalde, Bilbao.

In 2015, at the end of four years working in Israel and Palestine, Sheikh produced The Erasure Trilogy, a set of books and exhibitions which explores the anguish caused by the loss of memory—by forgetting, amnesia or suppression—and the resulting human desire to preserve memory, all seen through the prism of the Israeli-Palestinian conflict.

Sheikh then worked in collaboration with Eyal Weizman on The Conflict Shoreline, a publication in response to Sheikh's "Desert Bloom" series which explored the historical, legal, and archival underpinnings of the land claims of the Bedouin community of Al-'Araqib, the "unrecognized" village at the threshold of the Negev desert which has been demolished more than 70 times in the ongoing "battle over the Negev." The Conflict Shoreline was submitted as evidence for the NGO Zochrot's project on transitional justice, the Truth Commission on the responsibility of Israeli society for the events of 1948–1960. In 2015, Eduardo Cadava, the author and Princeton scholar, who has written extensively on Sheikh's work in the past, published the monograph, Erasures, in response to The Erasure Trilogy.

== Awards ==
- J. William Fulbright Foundation Fellowship to Kenya, 1992
- National Endowment for the Arts Fellowship, 1994
- New Jersey State Council on the Arts Fellowship, 1994
- Infinity Award, International Center of Photography, 1995
- Leica Medal of Excellence, 1995
- Ruttenberg Award, 1995
- Ferguson Award, 1995
- Le Prix d'Arles, Dialogue de l'Humanité, 2003
- MacArthur Fellows Program, 2005
- International Henri Cartier-Bresson Grand Prize, 2005
- Soros Foundation / Open Society Institute Distribution Award, 2007
- Prix Nadar (Ladli, special mention), 2007
- Deutscher Fotobuchpreis (shortlist, Ladli), 2007
- Deutsche Börse Photography Prize (finalist), 2008
- Lucie Foundation Humanitarian Award, 2009
- Deutscher Fotobuchpreis (The Circle), 2009
- John Simon Guggenheim Memorial Foundation Fellowship, 2012

== Various exhibitions ==
- 1996 Fazal Sheikh: A Sense of Common Ground, International Center of Photography, New York City
- 1998 Fazal Sheikh: A Sense of Common Ground, Sprengel Museum, Hannover
- 1999 Fazal Sheikh: The Victor Weeps, Fotomuseum Winterthur
- 2000 Fazal Sheikh – The Victor Weeps, The Art Institute of Chicago
- 2002 Fazal Sheikh: The Victor Weeps – Afghanistan, Zimmerli Art Museum, New Jersey
- 2003 Cruel and Tender, The Real in the Twentieth-Century Photograph, Tate Modern, London
- 2003 Fazal Sheikh: A Camel for the Son – Ramadan Moon – The Victor Weeps, Davis Museum and Cultural Center
- 2004 Fazal Sheikh, The United Nations, New York City
- 2005 After the Fact, Martin-Gropius-Bau, Berlin
- 2007 Fazal Sheikh – Moksha and Ladli – HCB Award Winner 2005, Henri Cartier-Bresson Foundation, Paris
- 2008 Deutsche Börse Photography Prize, Photographer's Gallery, London
- 2008 Archive Fever: Uses of the Document in Contemporary Art International Center of Photography
- 2009 Fazal Sheikh, Fundación Mapfre, Madrid, Spain
- 2009 Fazal Sheikh, Huis Marseille Museum for Photography, Amsterdam
- 2009 Beloved Daughters – Photographs by Fazal Sheikh, Nelson-Atkins Museum of Art
- 2010 Fazal Sheikh Museo de Arte de Banco de la República, Bogotá
- 2010 The Image in Question: War – Media – Art, Carpenter Center for the Visual Arts, Harvard University
- 2012 Fazal Sheikh – Ether, Pace/MacGill Gallery, New York City
- 2014 Now You See It: Photography and Concealment, Metropolitan Museum of Art, New York City
- 2016 Fazal Sheikh, – Independence | Nakba, Pace/MacGill Gallery, New York City
- 2016 This Place, Brooklyn Museum of Art
- 2017 Common Ground: Photographs by Fazal Sheikh, 1989-2013, Denver Art Museum
- 2024 Fazal Sheikh: Thirst | Exposure | In Place, Denver Art Museum

== Publications ==
- A Sense of Common Ground (Scalo Publishers), ISBN 978-1881616511
- The Victor Weeps (Scalo, 1998), ISBN 978-3-931141-95-0
- A Camel for the Son (IHRS and Steidl, 2001), ISBN 978-0-970761309
- Ramadan Moon (IHRS and Steidl, 2001), ISBN 978-0-9707613-1-6
- Moksha (IHRS and Steidl, 2005), ISBN 978-3-86521-125-5
- Un Chameau Pour Le Fils (Photo Poche Societé, Actes SUD, 2005), ISBN 978-2-7427-5811-1
- Ladli, Steidl, 2007, ISBN 978-3-86521-381-5
- The Circle, Steidl, 2008, ISBN 978-3-86521-599-4
- Fazal Sheikh (Mapfre Foundation, 2009), ISBN 978-84-9844-177-2
- Portraits (Steidl, 2011), ISBN 978-3-86521-819-3
- Ether (Steidl, 2013), ISBN 978-3-86930-653-7
- The transformation of the world depends upon you (with W. Ewald, T. Keenan, and M. Saxton; Steidl, 2013), ISBN 978-3-86930-741-1
- The Erasure Trilogy (Steidl, 2015), ISBN 978-3-86930-805-0
- Weizman, Eyal; Sheikh, Fazal (2015). The conflict shoreline: colonization as climate change in the Negev Desert (PDF). Göttingen: Steidl. ISBN 978-3-86930-805-0. OCLC 933298476.
- The Conflict Shoreline: Colonization as Climate Change in the Negev Desert, Eyal Weizman (Göttingen: Steidl and Cabinet Books, 2015). ISBN 978-3-95829-035-8
- Human Archipelago (with Teju Cole, Steidl, 2018), ISBN 978-3-95829-568-1
- The Moon Is Behind Us (with Terry Tempest Williams, Steidl, 2021), ISBN 978-3958298804

== Collections ==
- J. Paul Getty Museum, Los Angeles
- Stedelijk Museum, Amsterdam
- Metropolitan Museum of Art, New York City
- International Center of Photography, New York City
- Henri Cartier-Bresson Foundation, Paris
- International Museum of Photography and Film, Rochester
- Los Angeles County Museum of Art
- Museum Folkwang, Essen
- Fotomuseum Winterthur
- Philadelphia Museum of Art
- Yale University Gallery of Art, New Haven
- San Francisco Museum of Modern Art
- Art Institute of Chicago
- National Gallery of Art, Washington DC
- Museum of Fine Arts, Houston
- National Museum of Kenya, Nairobi
- Sprengel Museum, Hannover
- Mapfre Foundation, Madrid
- Library of Congress, Washington DC
