= Carden House =

Carden House may refer to:

- David A. Carden House, Houston, Texas, listed on the National Register of Historic Places (NRHP)
- James B. Carden House, Summersville, West Virginia, NRHP-listed

== See also ==
- Carden Rockshelter, Brigham, Wisconsin, NRHP-listed
