= Refuge: An Unnatural History of Family and Place =

1991 book-length essay by Terry Tempest Williams

- Author: Terry Tempest Williams
- Genre: Creative nonfiction
- Publisher: Pantheon Books
- Publication date: 1991
- Pages: 304 pp.
- ISBN: 978-0-679-40516-0

Refuge: An Unnatural History of Family and Place is a book-length essay by environmentalist Terry Tempest Williams. This book explores the relationship between the natural and unnatural along with condemning the American government for testing nuclear weapons in the West. Williams uses components of nature such as the flooding of the Great Salt Lake and the resulting dwindling populations of birds at Bear River Migratory Bird Refuge to illustrate the importance of nature preservation, acceptance of change, and the impact of human intervention on the natural world.

== Themes ==
Williams's many themes in Refuge revolve around humans, nature, and other natural and unnatural phenomena, such as cancer and death. Some themes are evident in her narrative, while other themes require some critical thinking to discover. Themes that can be found in her book include:

- Unnatural vs natural: A theme of unnatural vs natural is shown through Williams's belief that the breast cancer in her family was caused by the unnatural phenomenon of atomic testing and radiation testing where she lived. However, cancer can occur naturally in others because of how it is a part of the body.
- Humans have the need to “fix” the environment to suit their needs. This theme is shown through government of Utah's attempts to control the water level of the Great Salt Lake through the use of pumping, while the birds that live in the refuge nearby simply fly to another more suitable habitat to live.
- Cancer is a disease that affects everyone: Williams reveals this theme by writing about how she, her father, and the rest of the family struggled with Williams's mother through her cancer. Williams's father was especially affected by her mother's cancer.
- Women and their innate connection to nature: The Williams's women feel a deep adoration and understanding of the natural world, and are easily angered by humanity's negligence towards "Mother Earth".
- The decision to treat a medical illness or not: Should Williams's mother receive the chemotherapy and prolong her life or accept the inevitability of death? Humans struggle with the advances in modern medicine and lose sight of the cycle of life.
- Human desire for solitude within nature is apparent in Williams's book because of her relationship with the bird refuge. She seeks a place to escape and exist only for herself. The bird refuge provides that quiet place to reflect and reconnect with the natural world.
- Delusion within humanity: Is present when Terry's father neglects to accept his wife's cancer. He continues to push treatments upon her in order to preserve her life. However, Terry's mother wants to live unassisted and faces wholeheartedly the reality of her situation.
- The strength and depth of relationships between women is a major aspect of the narrative, as the majority of people with whom Williams connects on a complex level are women, particularly her mother and grandmother. It is either in the company of women or in solitude that Williams comes to important conclusions and realizes the strength of humanity.
- The power of nature over the lives of humans is demonstrated throughout the narrative with the rising of the water levels of the Great Salt Lake. Just by the flooding alone, the residents of the area had their lives interrupted to the point that they considered intervention the only option. Williams, however, points out that nature is too powerful to be contained by technology, and is instead humbled by it. Humans should learn to live with nature, as they cannot win against it.

== Synopsis ==
Terry Tempest Williams, the author, who narrates the book, will be referred to as "Terry" in the synopsis.

=== Pages 1-80 ===
Terry Tempest Williams opens up the book by talking about nature. The Great Salt Lake, the burrowing owl refuge, climate change, everything. She begins the story with a distinct focus on nature. She has an unparalleled connection with nature. She feels a close personal tie to the Great Salt Lake, with the animals in the Salt desert area, but most specifically with the burrowing owls. This connection goes back to her days as a child, bird watching with her grandmother and spending carefree days on bus tours, or just simply at the refuge. Williams goes on to explain how every woman in her family, blood related and not, have all been afflicted with breast cancer. The women have had very serious cases, almost always requiring a mastectomy. And while the cancer only manifests itself in the women, it affects the entire family. This book focuses on Terry's mother, Diane's, cancer relapses, and she is faced with a bout of ovarian cancer. At first, she almost refuses any treatment, citing that she would rather live her life naturally, rather than deal with the pain and suffering of chemotherapy and radiation treatment which are not guaranteed to cure her. However, after some deliberation, she agrees to go through with eleven month chemotherapy. Meanwhile, the Great Salt Lake is getting increasingly uncontrollable, so the government comes up with five separate options of how to keep the lake in check. Diane's treatment appeared to have gone well, and the doctor happily informs them that all seems well. However, he was wrong, and there was some cancer which appeared to remain. This would require an extra six weeks of radiation treatment.

=== Pages 80-130 ===
The levels of the lake continue to sink, and a new character named Alan Sandoval is introduced to the story. Tamra is a cancer patient that Diane exchanges letters with as they deal with the physical and emotional effects of their cancer diagnoses and treatments. Terry discusses the importance of communicating through letters. During this exchange of letters, Terry and Brooke are in walking the salt flats in Nevada, while her parents are in Switzerland. Later, when the eastern shore of the Great Salt Lake is frozen, Terry takes her mother to the Bird Refuge for the first time, which was a very new experience for her. Later, Tamra sends a letter of thanks towards Diane while explaining her own adversities she faced battling her brain tumor. Tamra passes away, and Terry is therefore forced to seriously think about how much time she and her mother have together. Terry discusses the meaning of lists in her life and creates a comparison between her everyday life and bird watching.

Terry had to go to the hospital and have a small cyst removed from her right breast, which forces her to question if she will follow on her mother's path of cancer. She explains how seeing her mothers and grandmothers experiences with cancer affect her. Tempest then discusses the United Order (a community that the Mormon prophet Brigham Young created). There are particular aspects of this community relating to economic and governmental choices that are different from most. This ideal society incorporates personal choice of specialty and a cooperative, Mormon lifestyle. Terry and Diane continue to exchange Mormon stories during their time at the Refuge.

Terry, Diane and Mimi had their astrology done and they discussed their charts during a picnic by the Great Salt Lake. Amidst the sun, they discuss their relationship with birds and Tempest creates a metaphor of identity. On page 119 Terry asks “How do you find refuge in change?” Terry and Diane encounter so much change amidst Diane's sickness and the changing lake levels, with Mimi's answer as: “You just go with it.” So far in the readings there has been change after change, and we see the women yearning for refuges amidst these changes. Later, Terry and her mother attend Tamra's funeral and when they return the atmosphere along the Lake is very different because of the snowstorm. Later, they all celebrate Thanksgiving in a log cabin in the woods in Utah. Invited by Terry's Aunt and Uncle Rich and Ruth, the large family has their first holiday together after Diane's cancer treatment.

=== Pages 130-170 ===
Terry is fighting with her mother's cancer. The Bird Refuge is also continuing to flood and the government is trying to find a way to pump the flooding water so it doesn’t destroy and take over more of the land than it already has. Terry's mother, in the beginning, is coping well with cancer and is even starting to believe that cancer is her solitude and her refuge. But as her results start to get worse, so does the flooding of the Bird Refuge. Is nature directly related and dependent on an outside factor? On page 161, Terry's mother successful returns to surgery. Terry and the rest of the family begin to shows evidence of hope that she will survive this disease. Terry's mother then states, “Just let me live so I can die.. to keep hoping for life in the midst of letting go is robbing me of the moment I am in now.”

=== Pages 200-275 ===
Christmas time signifies the last time the Williams’ family will all be together for a reason they would have under normal circumstances. At New Year's, the family discusses funeral arrangements and the family passes a sleepless night. Terry continues to try to lift her mother's spirits, dressing in bright, gregarious outfits each day to give her something to think about other than her ever-weakening spirit. The tension in the house grows as Dr. Smith shows them how to give Diane morphine, and her father snaps. He yells at Terry, telling her he doesn’t want to “deal with” his wife anymore: Terry can go home and leave the house that has become a hospital, but he can’t. Terry asks her mother if she and her husband should have a child, and she says that raising a child is the most beautiful part of life. Terry, on the other hand, doesn’t want to lose her solitude and remains ambivalent. She resolves to follow her feelings, a common theme of the book. Terry's father comes home one day to a swarm of cars in the driveway, and he is infuriated once again. His emotions are the most evident, as he is not afraid to let loose. He shouts and tells everyone—mostly close relatives—to leave, even as Diane's morphine pump beeps to signal an emergency. They untangle the tubes and Diane is fine, but this was the last experience we see of the family with their mother alive. As the mortician tries to prepares Diane's body for the funeral, Terry has to remove the makeup from her mother's face repeatedly. This is important because it signifies Terry's love of what is pure and natural, not what others feel like they can do to improve it.

Terry goes for a walk in the woods with her husband, and falls, leaving a gash on her forehead. She considers it being marked by the desert, and sees it as a growing process, or a transformation, similar to ancient cultures participating in scarification rituals to denote change. Perhaps this could be a point in Terry's life where things begin to change for her. Alas, we soon hear that her grandmother, Mimi, has been diagnosed with cancer by the same Dr. Smith in the same hospital. Mimi takes the stance that she won’t fight the cancer, having learned from Diane, she will just go with it. Meanwhile, the Utah government is busy doing the opposite: instead of letting the Great Salt Lake rise on its own, they have “succeeded” in harnessing the lake through an intricate pumping plan costing a billion dollars. Visiting Oregon, Terry comes upon many of the birds that were displaced by the projects around the Great Salt Lake. Wetlands like the one in Oregon are refuges for these birds, just like the Great Salt Lake and her mother had been Terry's refuges.

=== Page 275-End ===
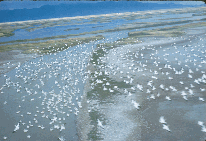
Birds in flight during the summer at Bear River Migratory Bird Refuge.

The flood is over, and the Bird Refuge is clear for the first time in seven years. The U.S. Fish and Wildlife Service grants $23 million to the Bear River Migratory Bird Refuge so that it may be properly restored. Brooke and Terry go out in a canoe on the Half-Moon Bay. While riding in the canoe, Terry is reminded of a trip she took to Mexico during the Spanish holiday, El Día de los Muertos, also known as “Day of the Dead.” While on this trip, Terry meets a man in the village of Tepoztlán. This man asks Terry what she wants from her dead. He then directs her to a small adobe with a turquoise door and says that if she is meant to find the door, she will. Terry finds the turquoise door and once she enters as well as white pews, and an altar with thirteen candles. Here, there are people praying out loud with a woman who is kneeling at the altar. These people are most likely locals of the area, and they have come to the adobe in honor of the Spanish holiday, El Día de los Muertos. While here, these people are able to experience a sort of spiritual connection with their dead. Terry states that she was also able to experience this spiritual connection. Afterwards, Terry ventures out into the streets of the village and experiences the village's festivities for El Día de los Muertos. Here, Terry meets a woman who tells her of her dead family members.

Terry continues to discuss her family's history of cancer and how as a group of people, it is traditionally uncommon for Mormons. In this section, Terry shares a recurring dream with her father. In her dream, she sees a flash of light in the desert. She learns from her father that when she was young, she witnessed a test bomb explosion. This knowledge allows Terry to then contemplate the medical histories of people who live in the area. She discusses many people who suffered from different types of cancer and died years later. Williams writes, “It was at this moment that I realized the deceit I had been living under.” Terry goes on to discuss how the government did not do anything to put an end to the bomb testing when all the while, the government was aware of the potential deadly effects that the bombs could have on humans. In the Mormon religion, Terry was taught as a child by her mother to not ask questions that would “rock the boat.” Now, Terry feels that abiding by the traditions and rules of her Mormon religion is no longer possible. Williams writes, “Tolerating blind obedience in the name of patriotism or religion ultimately takes our lives.” Terry now knows that she must question everything despite what her religion's values may encourage or what those around her believe.

The closing chapter of this book is a widely anthologized piece called "The Clan of the One-Breasted Women." Told in a dream-like style, this chapter describes a feminist protest at the Nevada nuclear test site. Women from all over the world are gathered in the desert speaking of change and dancing around a bonfire. The women are gathered here because they are mothers marching to claim the desert in honor of their children. Soldiers surround and arrest them. Williams calls her actions, “an act of civil disobedience.” She acted to honor the women who have suffered from the deadly effects of nuclear testing. The chapter concludes with Terry and the other arrested women being left alone in the desert. Yet instead of feeling stranded, they are at home in nature.
