= Debra Bloomfield =

American photographer

- Born: Debra Bloomfield
- Education: M.A. San Francisco State University, 1981
- Known for: Photography
- Awards: Western Heritage Literary Award in Photography, 2005, "Four Corners" monograph; James D. Phelan Art Award in Photography, San Francisco Foundation, 1991-2, "The Trotsky Series"

Debra Bloomfield (born 1952) is an American photographer. She has photographed extensively in Mexico, the American Southwest, Alaska, and California, and has taught photography in the San Francisco Bay Area for over 30 years.

== Life and work ==
Bloomfield was born in Los Angeles, California. She received a B.A. and M.A. from San Francisco State University in 1976 and 1981, respectively. She lives in Berkeley, California and teaches photography at the San Francisco Art Institute.

She has photographed the American landscape for over thirty years. Primarily in color and often in large scale, her photographs are born from an emotional response to location and memory. Her images draw on the visual language of metaphor and explore the relationship between interiority and the external world. Her photographic works include Swimming Pools, Hothouse, Frida/Trotsky, Four Corners, Memory, Oceanscapes, and Wilderness / Up North.

Her work is included in the collections of the San Francisco Museum of Modern Art, the Berkeley Art Museum and Pacific Film Archive, and The Victoria and Albert Museum in London, England, among others. She has received the 1991/92 San Francisco Foundation's James D. Phelan Art Award in Photography for her "Trotsky Series", and the 2005 Western Heritage Literary Award in Photography for her monograph "Four Corners".

== Publications ==
- "Wilderness," 2014 University of New Mexico Press. Essays by Lauren E. Oakes, Rebecca A. Senf, and Terry Tempest Williams.
- "Still: Oceanscapes by Debra Bloomfield," 2008 Chronicle Books. Foreword by Terry Tempest Williams, interview with Corey Keller.
- "Four Corners," 2004 University of New Mexico Press. Essays by Debra Bloomfield, Linda Connor, and Douglas Nickel.

== Exhibitions ==
- "Points of View: Photography from the Collection," Berkeley Art Museum and Pacific Film Archive, 1996
- "California Current--The Photographer's Perspective," Armand Hammer Museum of Art and Culture Center, Los Angeles, CA, 1997
- "Four Corners Project," Richard Levy Gallery, Albuquerque, NM, 2001
- Art Chicago, Chicago, IL, Robert Koch Gallery, 2004
- "Monumental Landscapes," Fahey/ Klein Gallery, Los Angeles, CA, 2004
- "The Landscape of Time and Place," Etherton Gallery, Tucson, AZ, 2004
- "Oceanscapes," Richard Levy Gallery, Albuquerque, NM, 2004
- "Oceanscapes," Robert Koch Gallery, San Francisco, CA, 2004
- "Nineteen Going on Twenty," The Contemporary Museum, Honolulu, HI, 2007
- "Marvels of Modernism," George Eastman House International Museum of Photography and Film, Rochester, NY, 2008
- "Oceanscapes," Robert Koch Gallery, San Francisco, CA, 2008
- "A Grand View: Arizona Landscape Photography," Etherton Gallery, Tucson, AZ, 2010
- "The Summer Show," Scott Nichols Gallery, San Francisco, CA, 2011
- "Altered Reality," Julie Nester Gallery, Park City, UT, 2011
- "Backyard Oasis: The Swimming Pool in Southern California, 1945-1982," Palm Springs Art Museum, Palm Springs, CA, 2012
- "See, Hear, Feel: The Photographs of Debra Bloomfield and Christopher Churchill," Phoenix Art Museum, Phoenix, AZ, 2013-2014
- "Pacific Light," Fahey/Klein Gallery, Los Angeles, CA, 2017
- "Changing Seas," Robert Koch Gallery, San Francisco, CA, 2026

== Sources ==
- "Point of View," by Jane Gottlieb. Photo District News, October 2008
- "Breath of Light," by Roy Durfee. The New Mexican, Sunday, June 6, 2004
