= Frank S. Carden =

Tennessee politician

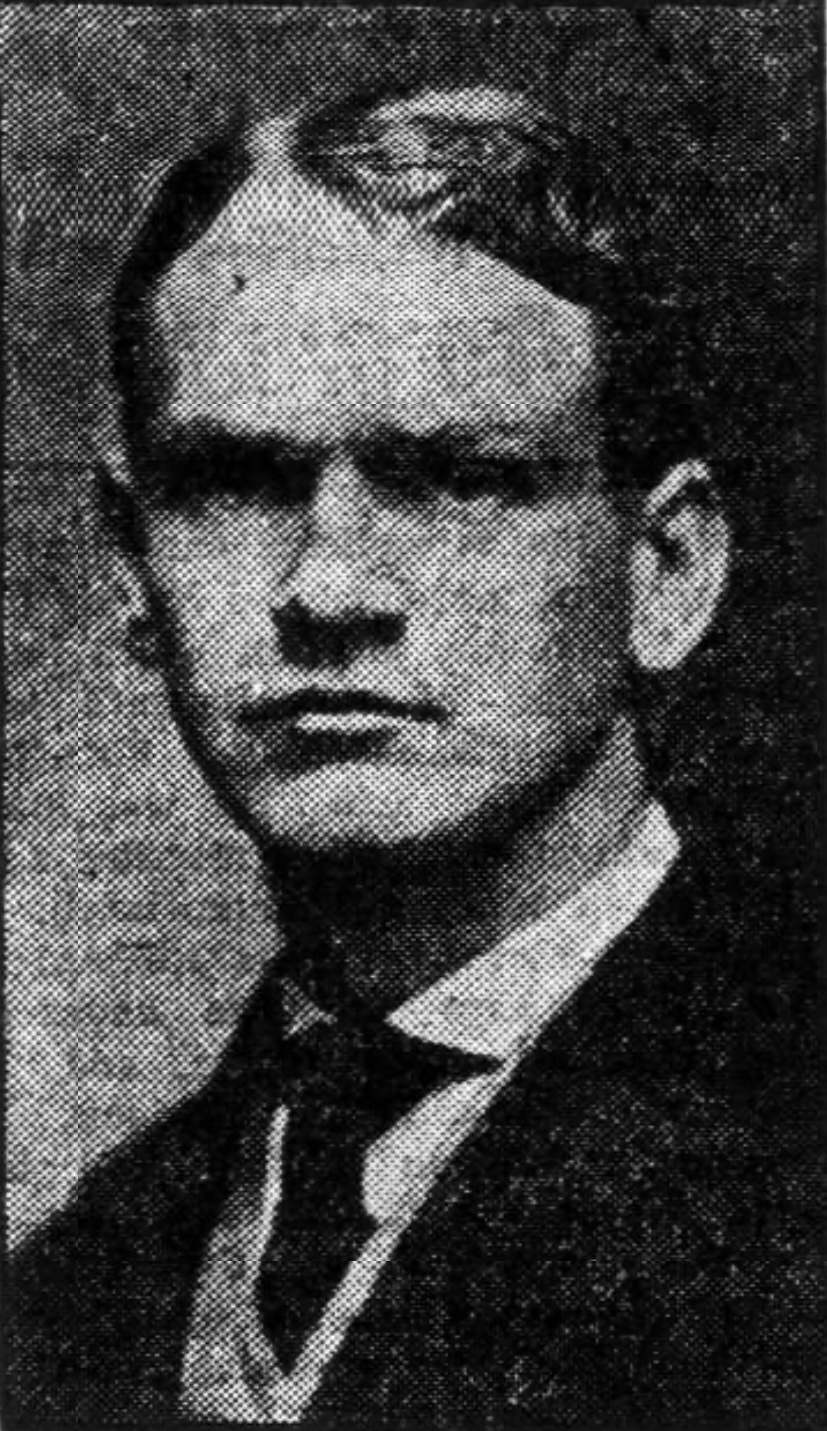

Member of the Tennessee House of Representatives
- In office 1907–1911
- Constituency: Hamilton

Personal details
- Born: February 6, 1882 Franklin, North Carolina, U.S.
- Died: March 4, 1934 (aged 52) Chattanooga, Tennessee, U.S.
- Party: Democratic
- Spouse: Frances Campbell
- Education: Cumberland Law School
- Occupation: Lawyer, politician

Frank S. Carden (February 6, 1882 – March 3, 1934) was an attorney and politician.

== Career ==
Frank Stamper Carden was born in Franklin, North Carolina; his father, W. C. Carden, was a Southern Methodist Minister, and his mother was Martha Stewart. His siblings included Leonard A. Carden and Robert A. Carden, who later were partners in Carden Brothers, an engineering firm; and two sisters, Mary Carden and Mrs. Milton V. Griscomb.

Frank Carden spent two years at Emory and Henry College in Virginia, and then went to Trinity College, graduating in 1901 with a Bachelor of Arts degree. He taught in eastern North Carolina, and then worked for an iron, coal and coke company in West Virginia, before obtaining a law degree from Cumberland Law School. He was editor in chief of the Cumberland Weekly, a student paper of the university, during the spring 1904 term.

Carden declared his candidacy for the Tennessee House of Representatives in April 1906, for Hamilton county, and won the nomination at the Democratic convention on September 15. At the general election in November he won 3,230 votes and was elected for the 1907 term. He chaired the municipal affairs committee during this term. In February 1907, when the Pendleton bill (a temperance bill) came before the house, Carden spoke against it, saying that "the state is running mad over temperance and reform".

In March 1907 he started a law firm, Vance & Carden, in Chattanooga, with a partner, D. B. Vance.

He was elected to the Tennessee House of Representatives again for the 1909 legislative session, this time with 4,579 votes. In January 1909 he spoke against the prohibition bill being debated, and eventually became known as an active opponent of Tennessee's dry laws. In the 1909 session he was chair of the committee on jails and workhouses. That session he introduced a bill to enable the state to earn interest on state money deposited with banks; at that time the state did not earn any interest on their deposits, which could be up to a million dollars. He did not run for re-election for the 1911 session.

In April 1911 he was appointed poll tax collector for Hamilton county, a newly created position, for an eight-year term. He was a member of the board that ran the primary elections for Hamilton County in August 1912.

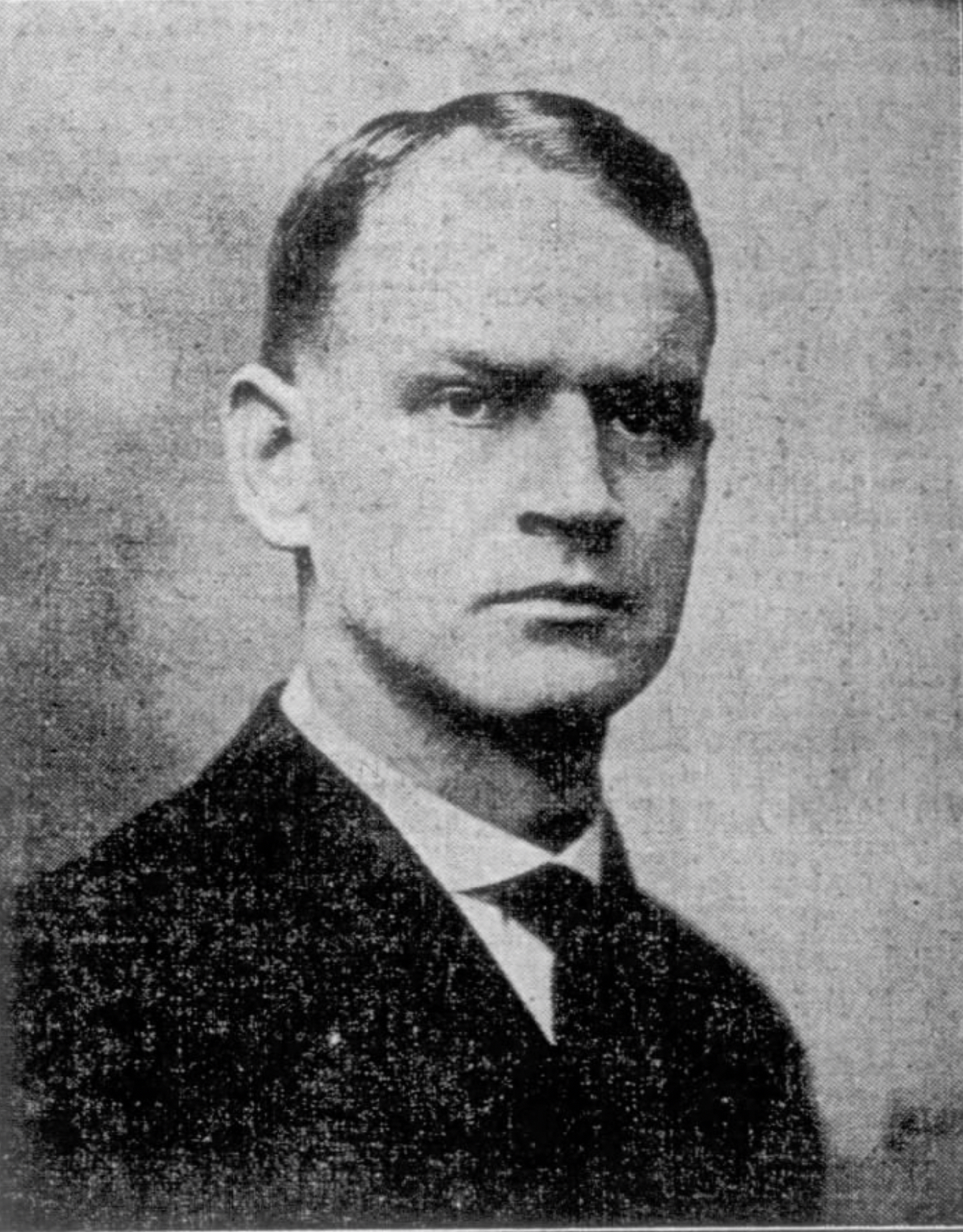
Frank S. Carden in about 1915

In October 1914 he announced his candidacy for city attorney of Chattanooga. He was elected to the post on April 13, 1915 and consequently resigned his post as poll tax collector. That April he also started a law firm, Carden & Snyder, with W. R. Snyder. Carden was re-elected as city attorney in 1919. In 1922 Carden and Ruth Durant Evans assembled all Chattanooga's ordinances into a single volume that became known as the Carden and Evans Code. Carden resigned in July 1922 and returned to practicing law privately.

He was one of the founders of the Children's Hospital at Erlanger in the 1920s. In 1926, Carden was one of the lawyers who wrote an amicus brief for the Tennessee Academy of Science for the Scopes Trial.

He was active in the campaign in Tennessee for the Twenty-First Amendment to the US constitution, repealing prohibition.

He married Frances Campbell on June 25, 1908. They had three children; their daughter Frances was born in October 1909, and their son Campbell in September 1915, He also had a son named Frank Jr., and a daughter, Alice Hall Carden. He died of heart disease in Chattanooga on March 3, 1934, and was buried in Forest Hills Cemetery. At the time of his death he was a senior partner in the law firm of Shepherd, Carden, Curry & Levine.

== Sources ==
=== Newspapers by date ===
- "Frank S. Carden a New Candidate for Democratic Nomination --Cummings and Watson Will Run Again". The Chattanooga News. April 7, 1906. p. 11.
- "Cummings, Carden and Groner are the nominees". The Chattanooga News. September 15, 1906. p. 8.
- "Well Qualified for the Office". The Chattanooga News. September 22, 1906. p. 8.
- "Three Democrats for Legislators". Chattanooga Daily Times. November 7, 1906. p. 9.
- "New Engineering Firm". The Chattanooga Star. February 20, 1907. p. 3.
- "New Law Firm". The Chattanooga News. March 7, 1907. p. 9.
- "Temperance Sidesteps for Other Legislation". Knoxville Sentinel. February 5, 1907. p. 3.
- "Would Make Charter Bill Effective Jan. 1". Knoxville Sentinel. March 21, 1907. p. 1.
- "Carden-Campbell". Nashville Banner. June 26, 1908. p. 7.
- "Hamilton Co.'s Legislative Race". The Chattanooga News. November 4, 1908. p. 12.
- "Frank Carden Makes Brilliant Speech Against Prohibition Force Bill, But It Has No Effect With State-Widers". The Daily Chattanoogan. January 14, 1909. p. 1.
- "Sentenced by Speaker". Chattanooga Daily Times. February 7, 1909. p. 3.
- "Representative Frank Carden". The Chattanooga News. April 22, 1909. p. 4.
- "Society". The Chattanooga News. October 18, 1909. p. 6.
- "Society News". Knoxville Sentinel. October 30, 1909. p. 8.
- "Frank Carden Will Not Run for Legislature". The Chattanooga News. August 22, 1910. p. 3.
- "Frank S. Carden Poll Tax Collector". The Chattanooga News. April 19, 1911. p. 5.
- "F. S. Carden Appointed". Chattanooga Daily Times. April 19, 1911. p. 5.
- "Primary Boards Named for Counties of State". Chattanooga Daily Times. July 8, 1912. p. 3.
- "Three for City Attorney". Chattanooga Daily Times. October 6, 1914. p. 5.
- "Littleton Ticket Won". Journal and Tribune. Knoxville, Tennessee. April 14, 1915. p. 5.
- "Form Law Partnership". Chattanooga Daily Times. April 20, 1915. p. 12.
- "Bryan New Delinquent Poll Tax Collector". Chattanooga Daily Times. April 21, 1915. p. 11.
- "Personal Mention of Well-Known People". Chattanooga Daily Times. September 4, 1915. p. 6.
- "Carden's City Code Ready for Distribution". Chattanooga Daily Times. April 30, 1922. p. 5.
- "City Attorney Frank Carden Resigns Office". Chattanooga Daily Times. July 7, 1922. p. 14.
- "Science Academy's Brief Quotes Two Vandy Professors". The Tennessean. Nashville, Tennessee. May 28, 1926. pp. 1, 11.
- "Miss Carden Bride of Cecil F. Holland". Chattanooga Daily Times. September 17, 1933. p. 18.
- "Frank Carden, Noted Lawyer, Passes Today". The Chattanooga News. March 3, 1934. p. 1.
- "Heart Attack Proves Fatal to F. S. Carden". Chattanooga Daily Times. March 4, 1934. p. 5.
- "Frank Carden Dies; Long Dry Law Foe". The New York Times. March 4, 1934. p. 31.
- "Last Rites Today for Frank Carden". Chattanooga Daily Times. March 5, 1934. p. 2.
- "Funeral Services for Frank S. Carden Monday". The Chattanooga News. March 5, 1934. p. 2.

=== Newspapers by author ===
- Shalett, Sidney M. (March 4, 1934). "Courthouse Hill". Chattanooga Daily Times. p. 6.

=== Other sources ===
- Students of Cumberland University (1904). The Phoenix. Lebanon, Tennessee: Cumberland University.
