= Competitive Tax Plan =

The Competitive Tax Plan is an approach to taxation, suggested in the United States, that would impose a 10–15% value added tax (VAT) and reduce personal and corporate income taxes. The plan was created by Michael J. Graetz, a tax law professor at Columbia Law School and a former Deputy Assistant Secretary of the Treasury for Tax Policy. Graetz states that the plan would generate enough revenue to exclude families earning less than $100,000 of annual income from having to pay income taxes or file tax returns. The Competitive Tax Plan would provide a new payroll tax offset to replace the Earned Income Tax Credit, protecting low and moderate income workers from any tax increase under the new system. Under the initial proposal, households with an annual income of more than $100,000 would be taxed at a flat 25% rate and the corporate income tax rate would be reduced to 25%. Graetz argues that reducing the corporate tax rate "would make the United States an extremely attractive nation for corporate investments for both U.S. citizens and foreign investors." In 2013, Graetz presented an updated version of his plan for 2015.

== About plan author ==
Michael J. Graetz is a professor at the Columbia Alumni of Tax Law. He was born on November 20, 1944, in Atlanta, Georgia. He is married and has five children.

Graetz is a leading expert on national and international tax law. He has taught at the University of Virginia Law School, University of Southern California, California Institute of Technology, and Yale Law School. He has also worked as an assistant to the secretary and special counsel for the Department of the Treasury. Graetz won the Daniel M. Holland Medal from the National Tax Association. He has written more than 80 articles on a wide range of tax, international taxation, health policy, and social insurance issues.

== The "Competitive Tax Plan" updated for 2015 ==
In his work, Graetz describes the U.S. as a "Low Tax Country" in comparison to other OECD countries. This means that the total federal, state and local tax revenues, as a percentage of GDP, are much lower than that of other OECD countries. Income Tax in the U.S., when compared to EU27 and OECD, is currently equal to or greater than most countries. According to Graetz's data from 2010, the U.S also has low consumption tax as a percentage of total taxation. Furthermore, Graetz mentions that the U.S. has been the only OECD country without a VAT. More than 160 countries all over the world already have a VAT. This needs to change according to his work. To address this, Graetz outlined "the five pieces of competitive tax plan" in his paper Updating the Competitive Tax Plan: A New Epilogue for 100 Million Unnecessary Returns as follows:

- "First, enact a VAT, a broad-based tax on sales of goods and services, now used by more than 160 countries worldwide. Many English-speaking countries call this a goods and services tax (GST)."
- "Second, use the revenue produced by this consumption tax to finance an income tax exemption of $100,000 of family income—freeing more than 120 million American families from income taxation—and lower the income tax rates on income above that amount."
- "Third, lower the corporate income tax rate to 15 percent."
- "Fourth, protect low-and-moderate-income workers from a tax increase through payroll tax cuts."
- "Fifth, protect low-and-moderate income families from a tax increase by substantially expanded refundable tax credits for children, delivered through debit cards to be used at the cash register." There are some basic principles surrounding the proposal of a goods and service tax:
- Broad-base, Single Rate, Credit-Method
- "Models are modern VATs like New Zealand, Australia, Canada, Singapore, and South Africa, not the archaic European VATs."
- "Destination-Based, Border-Adjusted"
- "High-threshold for Registration"
- "Incentive for States to piggy back"
- "Eighteen Month to Two-Year Interval between enactment and implementation for businesses and IRS to gear up" Proposed VAT is 12.9%.

The next point in the competitive tax plan is to shrink the income tax. He proposed to limit the income tax only to high-income earners in order to ensure that the federal tax system remain progressive. Another step is to provide a Family Allowance of $100,000 for married couples ($50,000 for singles, $75,000 for heads of households). This step will eliminate a great part of income tax returns (more than 120 million), and it also will result in fewer than 20 percent of all U.S. tax units that will be required to file income tax returns. He stated specific levels of income tax rates. For example, for married couples, it will be:

- 14% for income between $100,000 and $200,000
- 27% for income between $200,000 and $600,000
- 31% for income over $600,000

The next step of the Proposal is to "Reduce and Reform the Corporate Income Tax". The proposed tax rate is 15 percent. This step should solve the problem of international income taxation as it removes current law incentives to locate deductions in the US and income abroad. It will also repeal the Corporate Alternative Minimum Tax. It should simplify small businesses' taxation.

Another part of the plan is to protect low and middle-income families by delivering new child credits through debit cards that can be used at the cash register. All children qualify for $1,500 per child( but for married couples with more than $150,000 ($75,000 singles and heads of households), these credits phase-out at a rate of 5%*). For low and moderate income workers it will be even more.

Next to protecting low and middle-income families, the plan also speaks about protecting low and moderate-income workers by providing a Payroll Tax Credit of 15.3 percent for wages up to $10,000 and $1,530 per worker for all workers with earnings between $10,000 and $40,000. This credit eliminates all payroll taxes for workers with $10,000 or less of earnings, also it eliminates at least the employees’ share (half) of payroll taxes for workers with earnings below $20,000. Above $40,000, this credit phases out at a rate of 7.65 percent.

No formal bill for the Competitive Tax Plan itself is in Congress; however, Senator Ben Cardin's Progressive Consumption Tax Act has many similar features.

== See also ==
- Income tax in the United States
- Taxation in the United States
- Tax reform
