= Ben Cardin =

American lawyer and former politician (born 1943)

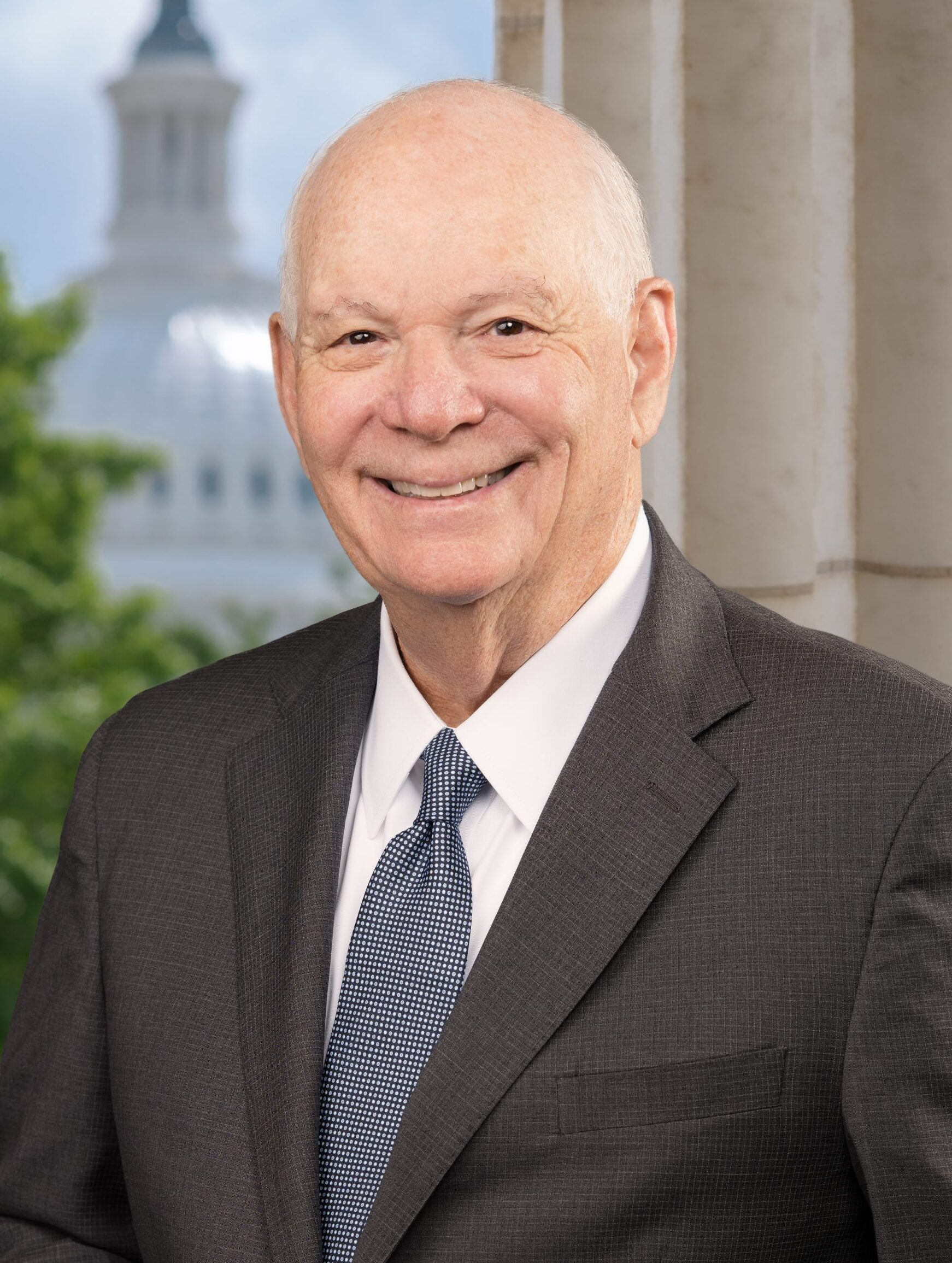
- Official portrait, 2024

United States Senator from Maryland
- In office January 3, 2007 – January 3, 2025
- Preceded by: Paul Sarbanes
- Succeeded by: Angela Alsobrooks
Senate positions
Chair of the Senate Foreign Relations Committee
In office September 27, 2023 – January 3, 2025
Preceded by	Bob Menendez
Succeeded by	Jim Risch
Chair of the Senate Small Business Committee
In office February 3, 2021 – September 27, 2023
Preceded by	Marco Rubio
Succeeded by	Jeanne Shaheen
Ranking Member of the Senate Small Business Committee
In office February 6, 2018 – February 3, 2021
Preceded by	Jeanne Shaheen
Succeeded by	Rand Paul
In office January 3, 2015 – April 2, 2015
Preceded by	Jim Risch
Succeeded by	Jeanne Shaheen
Ranking Member of the Senate Foreign Relations Committee
In office April 2, 2015 – February 6, 2018
Preceded by	Bob Menendez
Succeeded by	Bob Menendez

Member of the U.S. House of Representatives from Maryland's 3rd district
- In office January 3, 1987 – January 3, 2007
- Preceded by: Barbara Mikulski
- Succeeded by: John Sarbanes

103rd Speaker of the Maryland House of Delegates
- In office January 6, 1979 – January 3, 1987
- Preceded by: John Hanson Briscoe
- Succeeded by: Clayton Mitchell

Member of the Maryland House of Delegates from the 42nd district
- In office January 6, 1967 – January 3, 1987
- Preceded by: Maurice Cardin
- Succeeded by: David Shapiro

Personal details
- Born: Benjamin Louis Cardin; October 5, 1943 (age 83) Baltimore, Maryland, U.S.
- Party: Democratic
- Spouse: Myrna Edelman (m. 1964)
- Children: 2
- Relatives: Meyer Cardin (father); Maurice Cardin (uncle); Jon Cardin (nephew)
- Education: University of Pittsburgh (BA); University of Maryland, Baltimore (JD)
- Cardin's voice Cardin questioning Daniel Werfel, nominee for IRS commissioner. Recorded February 15, 2023

Benjamin Louis Cardin (born October 5, 1943) is an American lawyer and former politician who served as a United States senator from Maryland from 2007 to 2025. A member of the Democratic Party, he was the U.S. representative for Maryland's 3rd congressional district from 1987 to 2007. Cardin served in the Maryland House of Delegates from 1967 to 1987 and as its speaker from 1979 to 1987. In 58 years as an elected official, Cardin never lost an election.

Cardin was elected as U.S. senator to succeed Paul Sarbanes in 2006, defeating Republican Michael Steele, the lieutenant governor of Maryland. He became Maryland's senior U.S. senator on January 3, 2017, upon Barbara Mikulski's retirement. Cardin won reelection in 2012 and 2018, and retired from politics on January 3, 2025.

== Early life and career ==
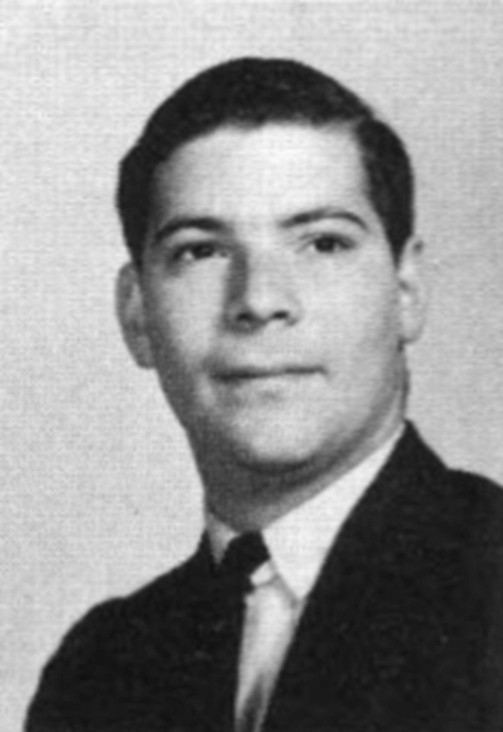
Cardin in the University of Pittsburgh yearbook, 1964

Benjamin Louis Cardin was born in Baltimore, Maryland. The family name was originally "Kardonsky", before it was changed to "Cardin". Cardin's grandparents were Russian Jewish immigrants. His maternal grandfather, Benjamin Green, operated a neighborhood grocery store that later turned into a wholesale food distribution company. His mother Dora was a schoolteacher and his father, Meyer Cardin, served in the Maryland House of Delegates (1935–1937) and later sat on the Baltimore City Supreme Bench (1961–1977).

Cardin and his family attended the Modern Orthodox Beth Tfiloh Congregation near their home, with which the family had been affiliated for three generations. Cardin attended Baltimore City College, graduating in 1961. In 1964, he earned a Bachelor of Arts degree cum laude from the University of Pittsburgh, where he was a member of the Pi Lambda Phi fraternity. He earned a Juris Doctor from the University of Maryland School of Law in 1967, graduating first in his class. Cardin was admitted to the Maryland Bar that same year, and joined the private practice of Rosen and Esterson until 1978.

== Early political career ==
=== Maryland House of Delegates ===
While still in law school, Cardin was elected to the Maryland House of Delegates in November 1966. He held the seat once held by his uncle, Maurice Cardin, who had decided to not run for re-election so that his nephew could instead pursue the seat. He was chairman of the Ways & Means Committee from 1974 to 1979, then served as the 103rd Speaker of the House until he left office. At age 35, he was the youngest Speaker in Maryland history at the time. As Speaker, he was involved with reform efforts involving Maryland's property tax system, school financing formula, and ethical standards for elected officials.

== U.S. House of Representatives ==
In 1986, with Congresswoman Barbara Mikulski mounting what would be a successful bid for the U.S. Senate seat vacated by retiring Senator Charles Mathias, Cardin ran for Mikulski's seat in the 3rd congressional district, which covered a large slice of inner Baltimore, as well as several close-in suburbs. Cardin won the Democratic nomination with 82 percent of the vote—the real contest in this heavily Democratic district. He won the general election with 79 percent of the vote against a perennial candidate, Republican Ross Z. Pierpont. He would be reelected nine times, never dropping below 65 percent of the vote.

Cardin served as one of the House impeachment managers that successfully prosecuted the case in the 1989 impeachment trial of Judge Walter Nixon.

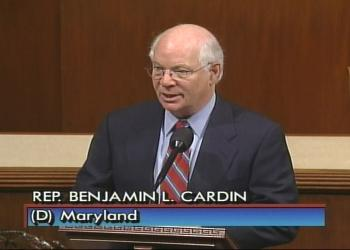
On the floor of the House on June 12, 2006, Representative Cardin calling for the withdrawal of all troops from Iraq by 2007

In the House, Cardin was involved with fiscal issues, pension reform, and health care. His legislation to increase the amount individuals can store in their 401k plans and IRAs was passed in 2001. His bill to expand Medicare to include preventive benefits such as colorectal, prostate, mammogram, and osteoporosis screening was also enacted. He also authored legislation to provide a Medicare prescription drug benefit for chronic illnesses; fund graduate medical education; and guarantee coverage for emergency services.

Cardin has also advocated, via proposed legislation, welfare reform. His bill to increase education and support services for foster children between ages 18 and 21 was signed into law in 1999. He authored bills to expand child support, improve the welfare-to-work program, and increase the child care tax credit.

Cardin has been commended for his work with fiscal policy. He has been honored by Worth magazine and by Treasury and Risk Management for his work protecting retirement plans and government-supported medical care for the elderly. He has also received scores of 100 percent from the League of Conservation Voters and the NAACP, indicating stances that are in favor of environmental protection and civil rights. Cardin was also one of 133 members of Congress to vote against the 2002 Iraq Resolution. In 2023, Cardin voted with a bipartisan majority to repeal the Authorization for Use of Military Force (AUMF) in Iraq.

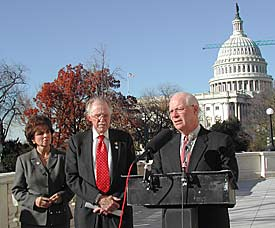
Cardin (at podium) joining fellow Representatives Roscoe Bartlett (center; R-MD) and Jo Ann Davis (left; R-VA) in calling for a study of homeland security needs of the National Capital region, including Maryland, Virginia and the District of Columbia

=== House committee assignments ===
As of May 2006, Cardin served on the following House committees:

- Member of the Ways and Means Committee.
  - Ranking member of the Trade Subcommittee.
  - Member of the Human Resources Subcommittee.
- Chairman of the Commission on Security and Cooperation in Europe.

== U.S. Senate ==
=== Elections ===
==== 2006 ====
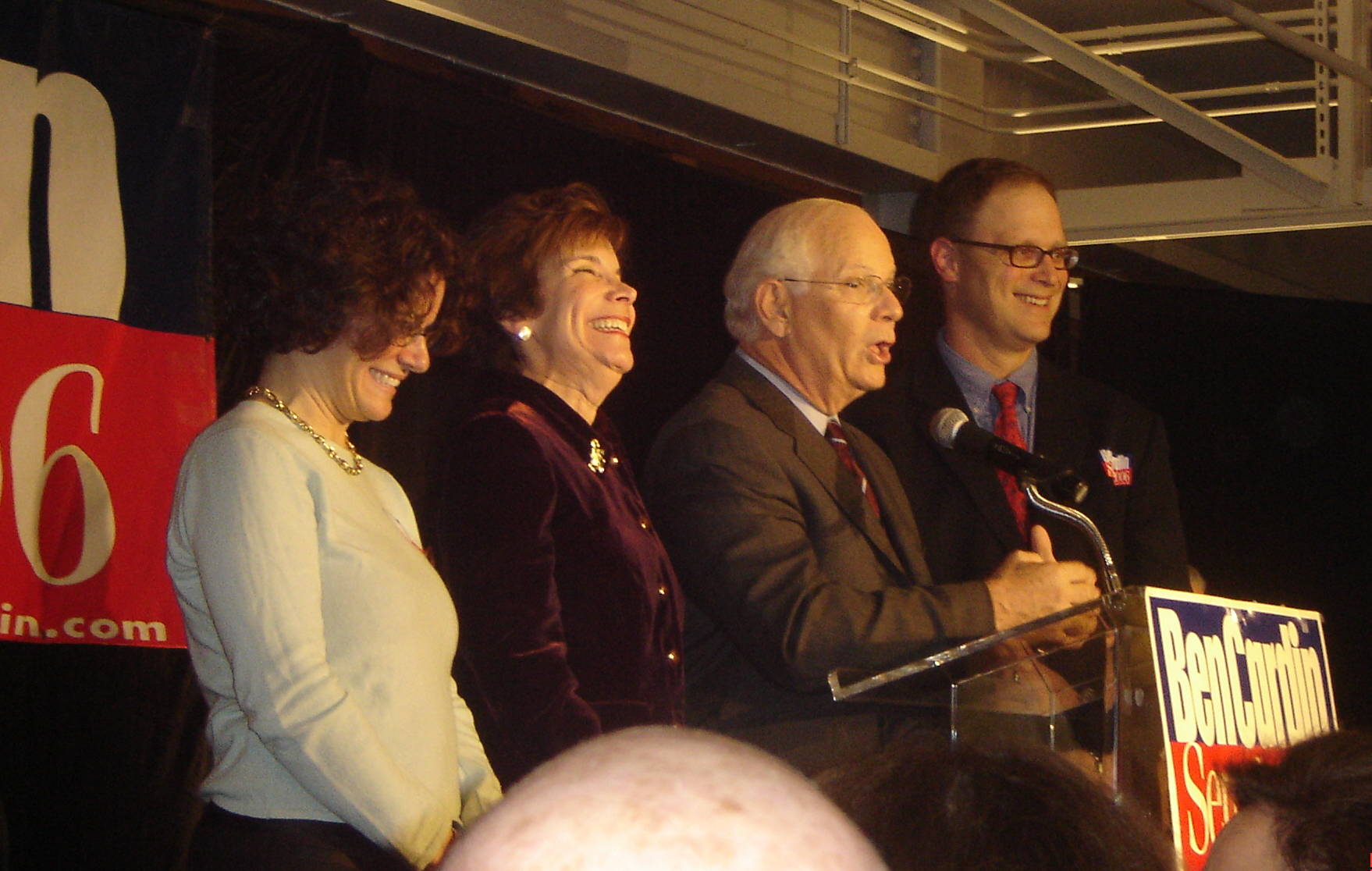
Cardin giving his victory speech shortly after winning the 2006 election.

On April 26, 2005, Cardin announced that he would seek the U.S. Senate seat of long-standing senator Paul Sarbanes (D-MD), following the announcement by Sarbanes that he would not be running for re-election in 2006. On September 12, 2006, Cardin faced a challenging primary battle with other Maryland Democrats, including Allan Lichtman, Josh Rales, Dennis F. Rasmussen, and his former House colleague Kweisi Mfume. Cardin won, however, with 44 percent of the vote, compared to 40 percent for Mfume, five percent for Rales, and two percent for Rasmussen.

Cardin won election on November 7, 2006, defeating Republican challenger Michael Steele 54 percent to 44 percent.

==== 2012 ====
In the general election, he faced Republican Dan Bongino, a former United States Secret Service agent, Independent Rob Sobhani, an economist and businessman, and Libertarian Imad-ad-Dean Ahmad, President of the Minaret of Freedom Institute. Cardin easily won the election, taking 56% of the vote to Bongino's 26.3%, Sobhani's 16.4% and Ahmad's 1%.

==== 2018 ====
Cardin was re-elected for a third term in 2018.

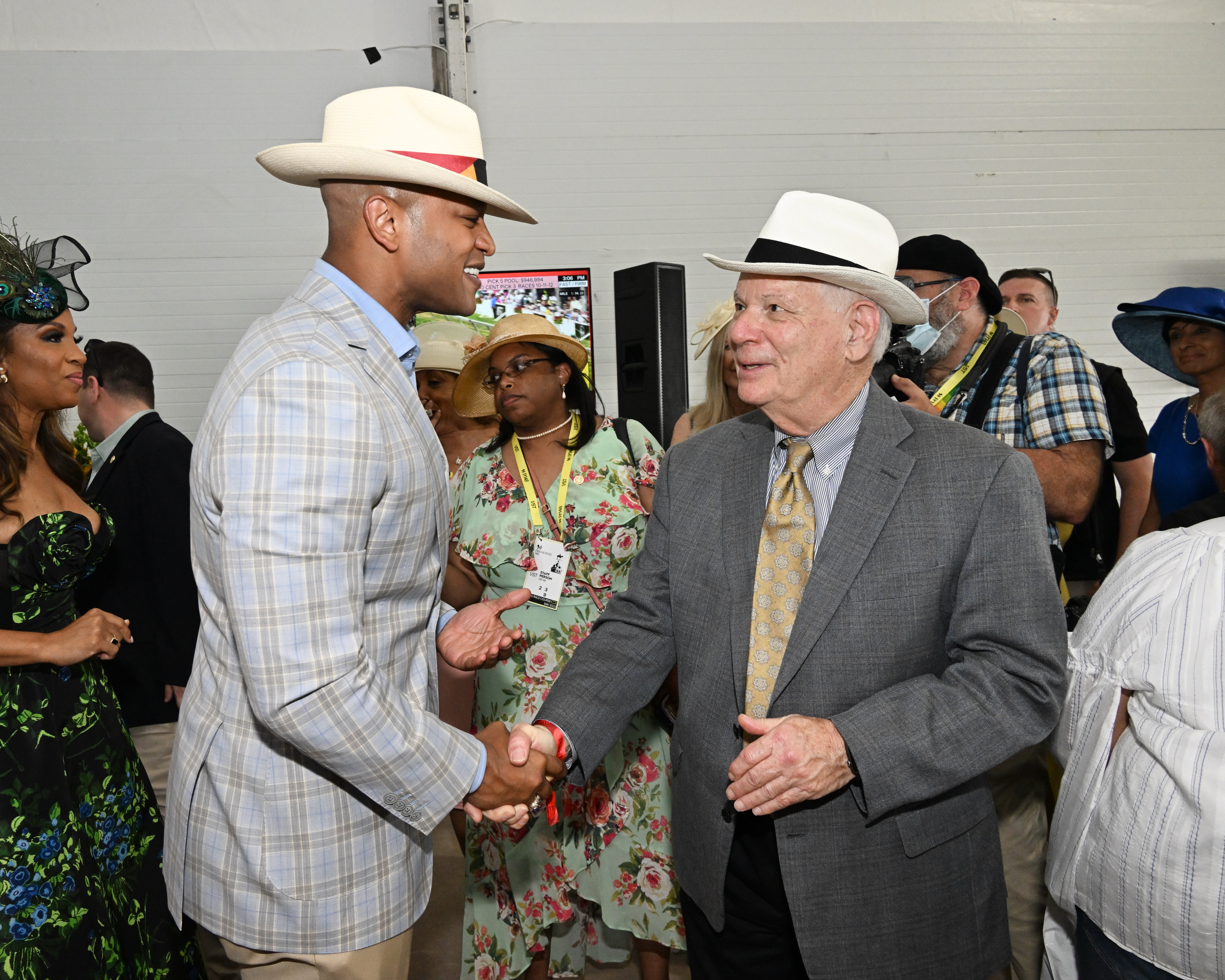
Cardin with Maryland governor Wes Moore on May 20, 2023, at the Preakness Stakes at the Pimlico Racetrack in Baltimore

==== 2024 ====
On May 1, 2023, Cardin announced that he would retire and not seek re-election in 2024.

=== Tenure ===
Cardin was participating in the certification of the 2021 United States Electoral College vote count when the January 6 United States Capitol attack happened. Cardin was on the Senate chamber floor when the rioters breached the Capitol. He was "ushered quickly — and I do mean quickly — away from the Capitol" after Vice President Mike Pence was removed from the chambers. During the attack, while Cardin hid with other senators in a safe location, he tweeted, blaming President Donald Trump for encouraging the rioters. He called for Trump to stop the protestors so the event would end "peacefully." Cardin also compared the police involvement during the attack to that seen during Black Lives Matter protests, calling it a "stark contrast." After the Capitol was secure, Cardin joined Congress to certify the count. After, he said that Trump should be held accountable for the insurrection and called for Republican leaders to tell Trump that he needs to resign. Two days later, on January 8, Cardin called for the invocation of the Twenty-fifth Amendment to the United States Constitution or impeachment to remove Trump.

In 2024, Cardin advocated for the federal government to fund the reconstruction of the Francis Scott Key Bridge in Baltimore after it collapsed when a ship crashed into it.

=== Senate committee assignments ===
- Committee on Environment and Public Works
  - Subcommittee on Clean Air and Nuclear Safety
  - Subcommittee on Fisheries, Water, and Wildlife
  - Subcommittee on Transportation and Infrastructure
- Committee on Finance
  - Subcommittee on Health Care (chair)
  - Subcommittee on International Trade, Customs, and Global Competitiveness
  - Subcommittee on Taxation and IRS Oversight
- Committee on Foreign Relations (chair)
  - Subcommittee on Europe and Regional Security Cooperation
  - Subcommittee on Near East, South Asia, Central Asia, and Counterterrorism
  - Subcommittee on State Department and USAID Management, International Operations, and Bilateral International Development (chair)
  - Subcommittee on Western Hemisphere, Transnational Crime, Civilian Security, Democracy, Human Rights and Global Women's Issues
- Committee on Small Business and Entrepreneurship

Cardin was selected by Majority Leader Chuck Schumer to fill in for Dianne Feinstein on the Judiciary Committee until she returned.

In 2015, Cardin became the ranking Democratic member on the Senate Foreign Relations Committee after the departure of Senator Robert Menendez as ranking Democrat and chairman. Two weeks after Menendez's departure, Cardin was credited with facilitating achievement of a unanimous committee vote in favor of the markup for the bill on the USA's involvement in the negotiations with Iran on nuclear technology.

=== Caucus membership ===
- Senate Oceans Caucus
- Senate Military Family Caucus
- Congressional Coalition on Adoption

==== Legislation sponsored ====
The following is an incomplete list of legislation that Cardin has sponsored:

- Affordable College Textbook Act (S. 1864; 115th Congress)

== International experience ==
Cardin has been a Commissioner on the Commission on Security and Cooperation in Europe (the U.S. Helsinki Commission) since 1993, serving as Ranking Member from 2003 to 2006. He subsequently served two terms as co-chair of the commission, from 2007 to 2008, and 2011 to 2012; and also two terms as chair, from 2009 to 2010, and 2013 to 2014. From 2015 to 2016 he was again ranking member. In 2006 he was elected vice president of the Organization for Security and Cooperation in Europe (OSCE) Parliamentary Assembly, and served through 2014.

== Post-senatorial career ==
In January 2026, Cardin joined Johns Hopkins University as a distinguished senior fellow.

== Ben and Myrna Cardin Center for Civic Engagement & Civil Discourse ==
In September 2025, Towson University established the Ben & Myrna Cardin Center for Civic Engagement & Civil Discourse in partnership with Cardin and his wife, Myrna Cardin, a Towson University alumna. The center focuses on civic engagement, civil discourse and democratic participation through student engagement, faculty collaboration, public programming and community involvement.

Cardin and his wife co-chair the center and provide strategic direction and thought leadership in partnership with Towson University faculty, students, staff and community partners. Cardin also joined Towson University as its second Presidential Scholar in connection with the center's launch. The center officially opened in October 2025.

On August 17, 2026, Cardin and his wife joined Towson University President Mark_R._Ginsberg in announcing the appointment of Nora Demleitner as the inaugural Executive Director of the Ben and Myrna Cardin Center for Civic Engagement & Civil Discourse at Towson University. Demleitner was appointed following a national search and was selected to lead the center's work promoting civic engagement, civil discourse, public service, and democratic participation. Cardin and his wife continue to serve as co-founders of the center and work with Demleitner and the university in advancing its mission.

== Honors ==
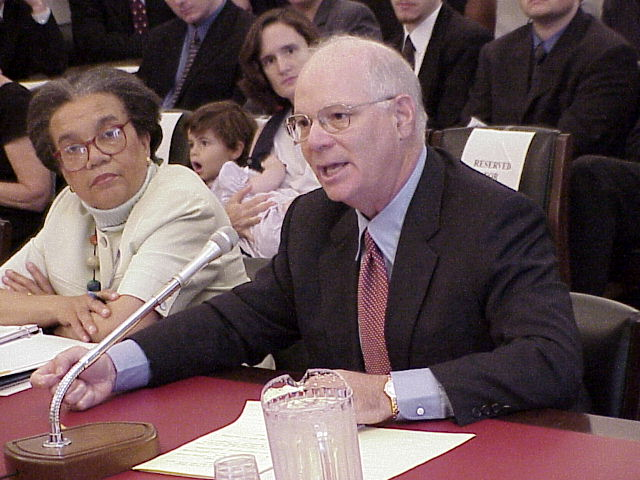
Cardin testifying before the U.S. House Ways and Means subcommittee on Human Resources

As of 2016 Cardin sits on the board of visitors of the University of Maryland School of Law, his law school alma mater.

Ben Cardin has also earned an Honorary Degree from University of Maryland, College Park in the Class of 2025 graduation ceremony held on May 22, 2025.

Cardin has been awarded the following foreign honor:

- Commander of the Order of the Star of Romania, Romania (June 8, 2017)

== Political positions ==
On a list by Congressional Quarterly of the members of Congress who were most supportive of President Barack Obama's legislative agenda in 2009, Cardin was tied for fifth most supportive senator with five other senators. In 2013, National Journal rated him as tied with six other Democratic senators for fifth most liberal senator. The American Conservative Union gave him a 4% lifetime conservative rating in 2020.

=== Agriculture ===
In June 2019, Cardin and 18 other Democratic senators sent a letter to Phyllis Fong, the USDA Inspector General, with the request that her office investigate USDA instances of retaliation and political decision-making and asserted that not conducting an investigation would mean these "actions could be perceived as a part of this administration's broader pattern of not only discounting the value of federal employees, but suppressing, undermining, discounting, and wholesale ignoring scientific data produced by their own qualified scientists."

=== Death penalty ===
Senator Cardin is a supporter of the death penalty but says it should only be applied to the "worst of the worst".

=== Economy ===
In March 2019, Cardin was one of six senators to sign a letter to the Federal Trade Commission (FTC) requesting it "use its rulemaking authority, along with other tools, in order to combat the scourge of non-compete clauses rigging our economy against workers" and espousing the view that such provisions "harm employees by limiting their ability to find alternate work, which leaves them with little leverage to bargain for better wages or working conditions with their immediate employer." The senators furthered that the FTC had the responsibility of protecting both consumers and workers and needed to "act decisively" to address their concerns over "serious anti-competitive harms from the proliferation of non-competes in the economy."

Cardin was an architect of the Paycheck Protection Program for small businesses during the pandemic.

=== Education ===
In 2007, Cardin supported the United States Public Service Academy Act. The Act would serve to create "an undergraduate institution devoted to developing civilian leaders." Like the Military Academies, this would give students 4 years of tuition-free education in exchange for 5 years of public service upon graduation.

=== Environment ===
Liberal environmentalists criticized Cardin for compromising too much while working with conservative James Inhofe on an amendment to Cardin's Chesapeake Bay legislation. Josh Saks, senior legislative representative for water resources campaigns with the National Wildlife Federation, praised Cardin as "the lead voice for clean water and the restoration of America's great waters in Congress."

In November 2018, Cardin was one of 25 Democratic senators to cosponsor a resolution specifying key findings of the Intergovernmental Panel On Climate Change report and National Climate Assessment. The resolution affirmed the senators' acceptance of the findings and their support for bold action toward addressing climate change.

In March 2019, Cardin was one of 11 senators to sponsor the Climate Security Act of 2019, legislation forming a new group within the State Department that would have the responsibility for developing strategies to integrate climate science and data into operations of national security as well as restoring the post of special envoy for the Arctic, which had been dismantled by President Trump in 2017. The proposed envoy would advise the president and the administration on the potential effects of climate on national security and be responsible for facilitating all interagency communication between federal science and security agencies.

=== Elections ===
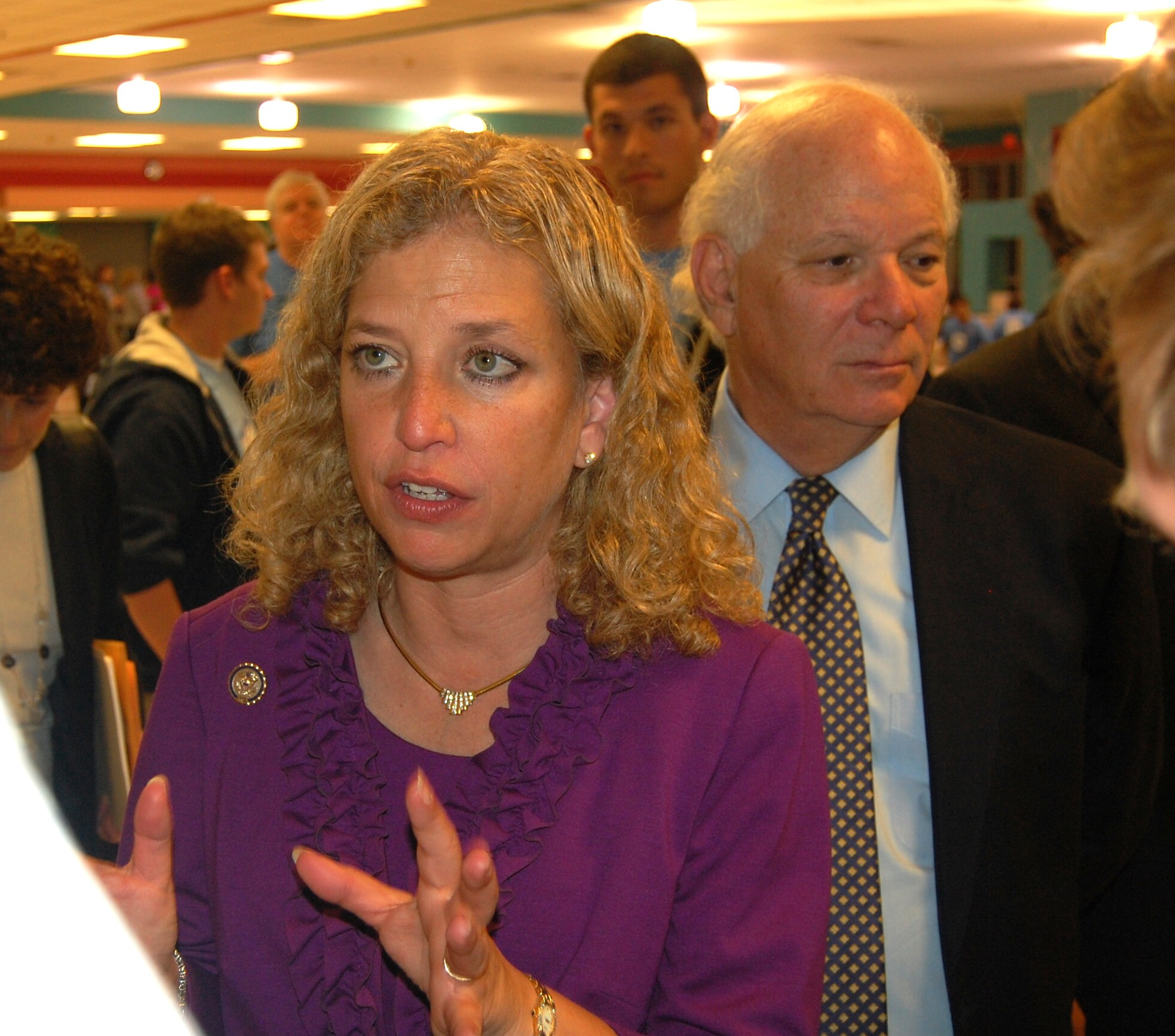
Cardin with Debbie Wasserman Schultz

In October 2018, Cardin, along with Senators Chris Van Hollen and Susan Collins, cosponsored a bipartisan bill that if passed would block "any persons from foreign adversaries from owning or having control over vendors administering U.S. elections." The Protect Our Elections Act would make companies involved in administering elections reveal foreign owners, and informing local, state and federal authorities if said ownership changes. Companies failing to comply would face fines of $100,000.

=== Equal Rights Amendment ===
Cardin has sponsored legislation in support of the Equal Rights Amendment.

=== Gun control ===
Cardin has an "F" grade from the NRA Political Victory Fund (NRA-PVF).

In 2013, he co-sponsored the Large Capacity Ammunition Feeding Device Act in an effort to ban large-capacity ammunition.

In response to the Orlando nightclub shooting, Cardin questioned the legality of military style assault weapons stating that "in my observations in Maryland, I don't know too many people who need to have that type of weapon in order to do hunting in my state or to keep themselves safe."

Cardin opposed the 2016 sale of approximately 26,000 assault rifles to the national police of the Philippines. His opposition led to the U.S. State Department halting the sale.

In the wake of the 2017 Las Vegas shooting, Cardin stated that thoughts and prayers were not going to save more people from dying in mass shootings. He also made a call for action to change gun laws, stating on Twitter that "Automatic weapons aren't needed to hunt deer or ducks; they're meant to kill people." In response to the shooting, Cardin sponsored Dianne Feinstein's proposal to ban bump stocks, which were used by the shooter to kill 58 individuals and injure over 500.

=== Journalism ===
In July 2019, Cardin and Rob Portman introduced the Fallen Journalists Memorial Act, a bill that would create a new memorial that would be privately funded and constructed on federal lands within Washington, D.C. in order to honor journalists, photographers, and broadcasters that have died in the line of duty.

=== Healthcare ===
In the 111th Congress, Cardin helped secure dental benefits in the State Children's Health Insurance Plan.

In August 2019, Cardin was one of 19 senators to sign a letter to Treasury Secretary Steve Mnuchin and Health and Human Services Secretary Alex Azar requesting data from the Trump administration in order to aid in the comprehension of states and Congress on potential consequences in the event that the Texas v. United States Affordable Care Act (ACA) lawsuit prevailed in courts, citing that an overhaul of the present health care system would form "an enormous hole in the pocketbooks of the people we serve as well as wreck state budgets".

In October 2019, Cardin was one of 27 senators to sign a letter to Senate Majority Leader Mitch McConnell and Senate Minority Leader Chuck Schumer advocating for the passage of the Community Health Investment, Modernization, and Excellence (CHIME) Act, which was set to expire the following month. The senators warned that if the funding for the Community Health Center Fund (CHCF) was allowed to expire, it "would cause an estimated 2,400 site closures, 47,000 lost jobs, and threaten the health care of approximately 9 million Americans."

=== Housing ===
In April 2019, Cardin was one of 41 senators to sign a bipartisan letter to the housing subcommittee praising the United States Department of Housing and Urban Development's Section 4 Capacity Building program as authorizing "HUD to partner with national nonprofit community development organizations to provide education, training, and financial support to local community development corporations (CDCs) across the country" and expressing disappointment that President Trump's budget "has slated this program for elimination after decades of successful economic and community development." The senators wrote of their hope that the subcommittee would support continued funding for Section 4 in Fiscal Year 2020.

=== International policy ===
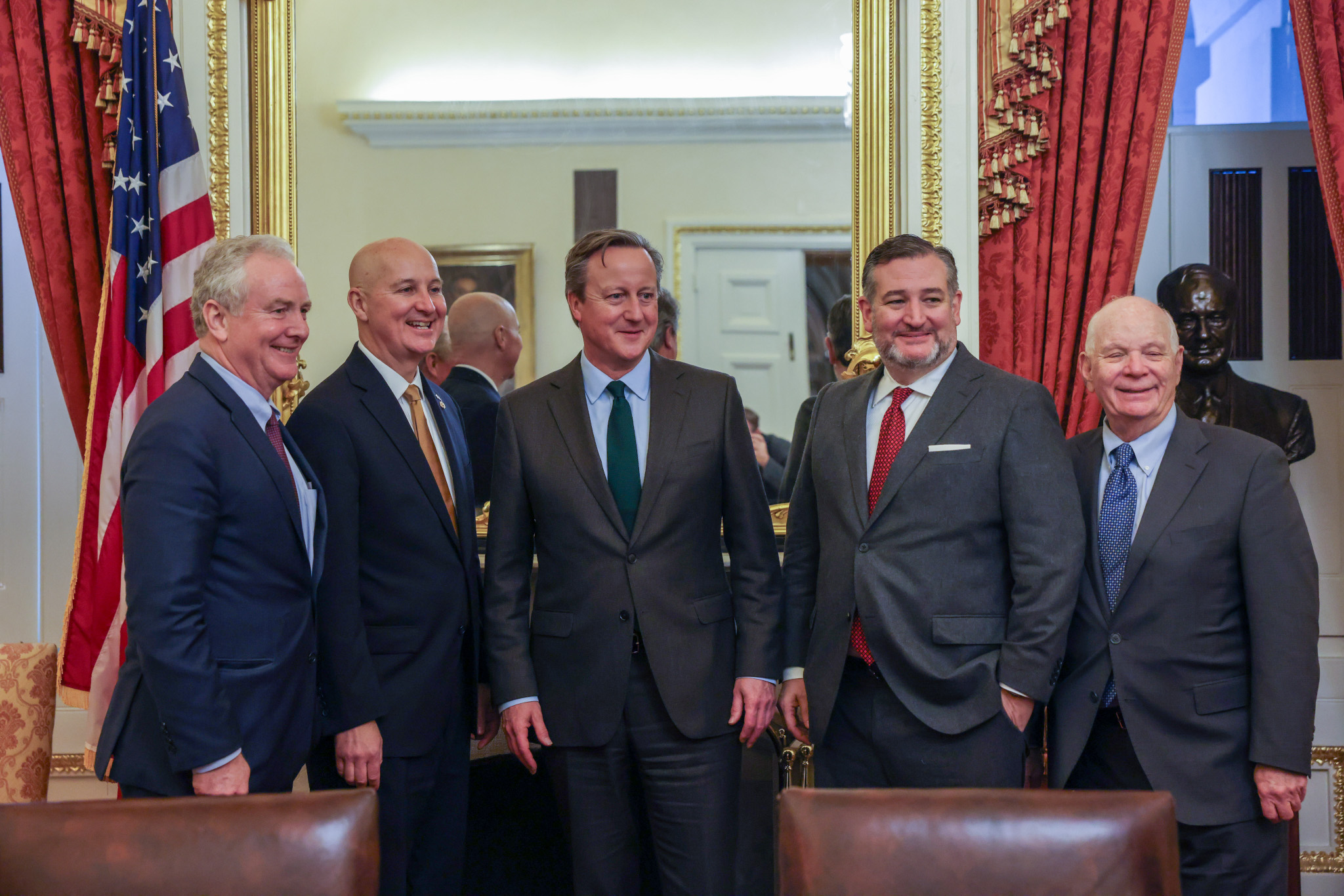
Cardin with UK Foreign Secretary David Cameron in Washington D.C. on December 6, 2023

On October 31, 2011, Cardin endorsed the proposal for the United Nations Parliamentary Assembly (UNPA). He is one of only six persons who served as members of the United States Congress ever to do so and is the only one who did so while in office.

Cardin has often supported positions that aim to strengthen America's relationship with Israel. In 2017, Cardin sponsored a bill, the Israel Anti-Boycott Act (S. 720), that would penalize commercial businesses that wanted to aid International NGOs and/or organizations in boycotting Israel. Cardin has argued that Israel's human rights record should not be considered in regard to sending U.S. military aid to Israel.

He supported civilian nuclear cooperation with India.

Weeks after the 2014 Hong Kong class boycott campaign and Umbrella Movement broke out which demands genuine universal suffrage among other goals, Cardin among bipartisan colleagues joined U.S. Senator Sherrod Brown and Representative Chris Smith's effort to introduce Hong Kong Human Rights and Democracy Act which would update the United States–Hong Kong Policy Act of 1992 and U.S. commitment to Hong Kong's freedom and democracy. "Civil society and democratic freedoms are under attack around the world and Hong Kong is on the front lines. The United States has a responsibility to protect human rights and defend against these threats," Cardin, chairman of the Senate Foreign Relations East Asian and Pacific Affairs Subcommittee said.

In July 2017, Cardin voted in favor of the Countering America's Adversaries Through Sanctions Act that placed sanctions on Iran together with Russia and North Korea. On October 11, 2017, in a joint statement, Cardin and Senator John McCain questioned the Trump administration's commitment to the sanctions bill.

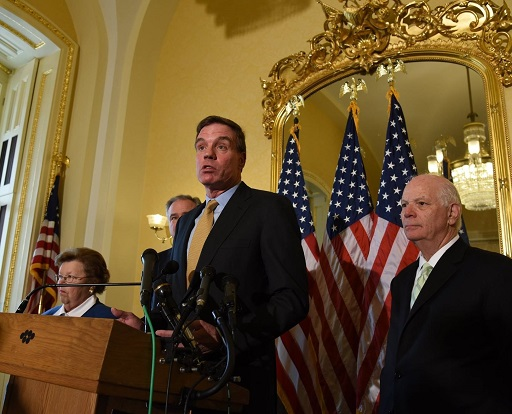
Cardin with Mark Warner in May 2017

In October 2017, Cardin condemned the genocide of the Rohingya Muslim minority in Myanmar and called for a stronger response to the crisis.

In August 2018, Cardin and 16 other lawmakers urged the Trump administration to impose sanctions under the Global Magnitsky Act against Chinese officials who are responsible for human rights abuses against the Uyghur Muslim minority in western China's Xinjiang region. They wrote: "The detention of as many as a million or more Uyghurs and other predominantly Muslim ethnic minorities in 'political reeducation' centers or camps requires a tough, targeted, and global response."

Cardin condemned President Erdoğan's wide-ranging crackdown on dissent following a failed July 2016 coup in America's NATO ally Turkey.

In April 2019, Cardin was one of 34 senators to sign a letter to President Trump encouraging him "to listen to members of your own Administration and reverse a decision that will damage our national security and aggravate conditions inside Central America", asserting that Trump had "consistently expressed a flawed understanding of U.S. foreign assistance" since becoming president and that he was "personally undermining efforts to promote U.S. national security and economic prosperity" through preventing the use of Fiscal Year 2018 national security funding. The senators argued that foreign assistance to Central American countries created less migration to the U.S., citing the funding's helping to improve conditions in those countries.

In 2023, Senator Cardin became the chair of the Senate Foreign Relations Committee. According to Jewish Insider, Cardin's office communicated to some activists that it does not have a plan to move the Mahsa Amini Human rights and Security Accountability Act (MAHSA Act) forward through the committee, likely killing the bipartisan Iran sanctions bill.

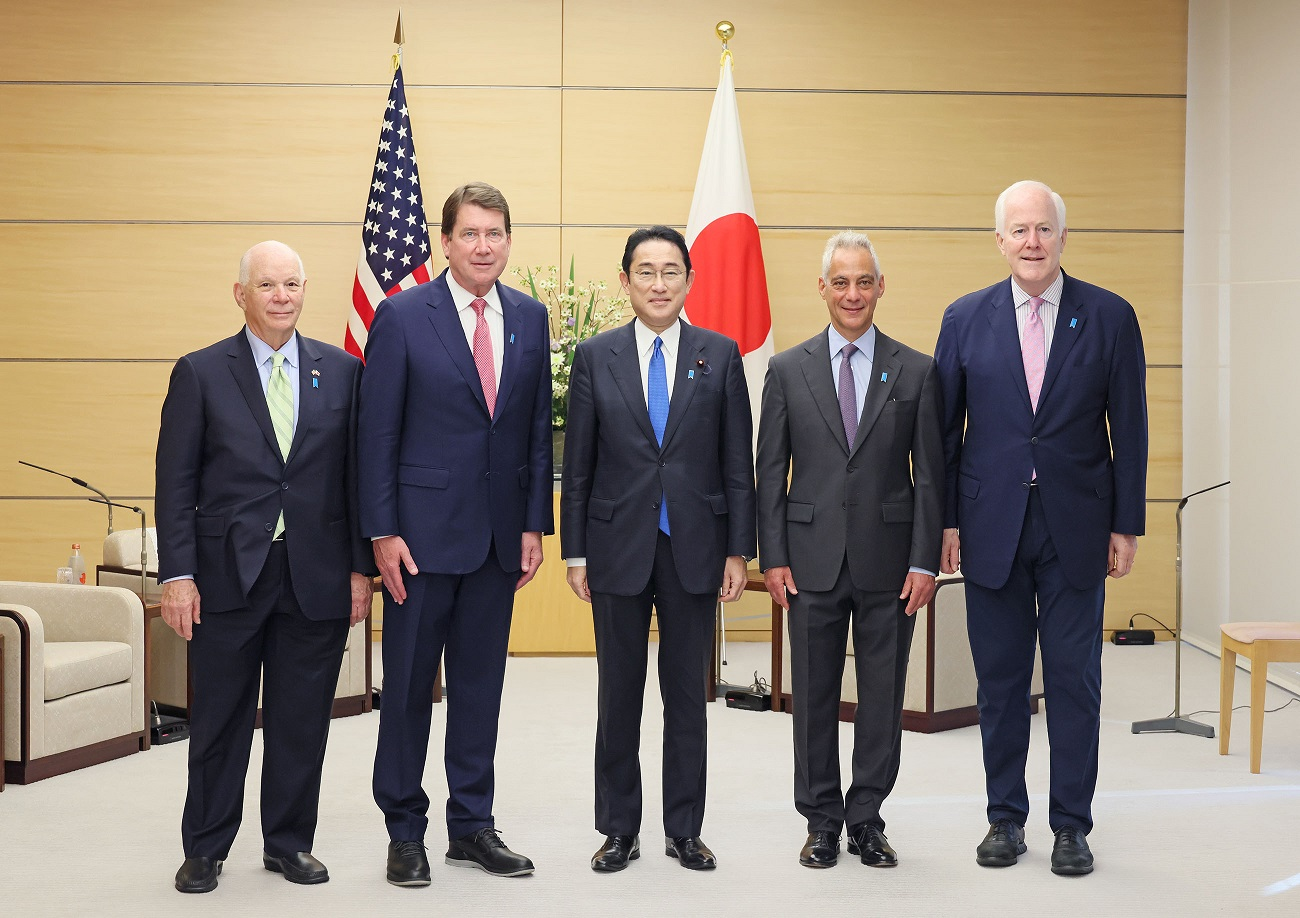
Ben Cardin (far left) with other senators, US ambassador to Japan Rahm Emanuel and PM of Japan Fumio Kishida in 2022

=== LGBTQ+ rights ===
In 2022, Cardin voted for the Respect for Marriage Act, legislation intended to codify same-sex marriage rights into federal law.

=== Online privacy ===
Cardin supports Net Neutrality, as shown by his vote during the 109th Congress in favor of the Markey Amendment to H.R. 5252 which would add Net Neutrality provisions to the federal telecommunications code. Cardin also supports Combating Online Infringement and Counterfeits Act, which gives DOJ the tools to target those site owners who are engaged in illegal digital piracy.

=== Taxes ===
Cardin is opposed to eliminating the tax deduction for charitable donations and supports raising taxes on higher-income earners. During a December 20, 2012, interview with Maria Bartiromo on CNBC, Cardin stated, "We're now a few days away from Christmas. The easiest way to get the revenues is to get the rates from the higher income, uh, taxpayers." In response to the question, "Are you prepared to vote to limit the loophole of charitable deductions?" Cardin responded, "No."

Cardin has, on multiple occasions, introduced a bill to adopt a "Progressive Consumption Tax", which is a variation of Michael J. Graetz's Competitive Tax Plan.

Cardin spoke out after the Pandora Papers were revealed in 2021. Cardin said, "The Pandora Papers are a wake-up call to all who care about the future of democracy. Thirty years after the end of the Cold War, it is time for democracies to band together and demand an end to the unprecedented corruption that has come to be the defining feature of the global order. We must purge the dirty money from our systems and deny kleptocrats safe haven."

=== Whistleblowers ===
In November 2011, Cardin's intended update of the 1917 Espionage Act upset some public disclosure advocates. They complained that it "would make it harder for federal employees to expose government fraud and abuse."

=== Israel ===
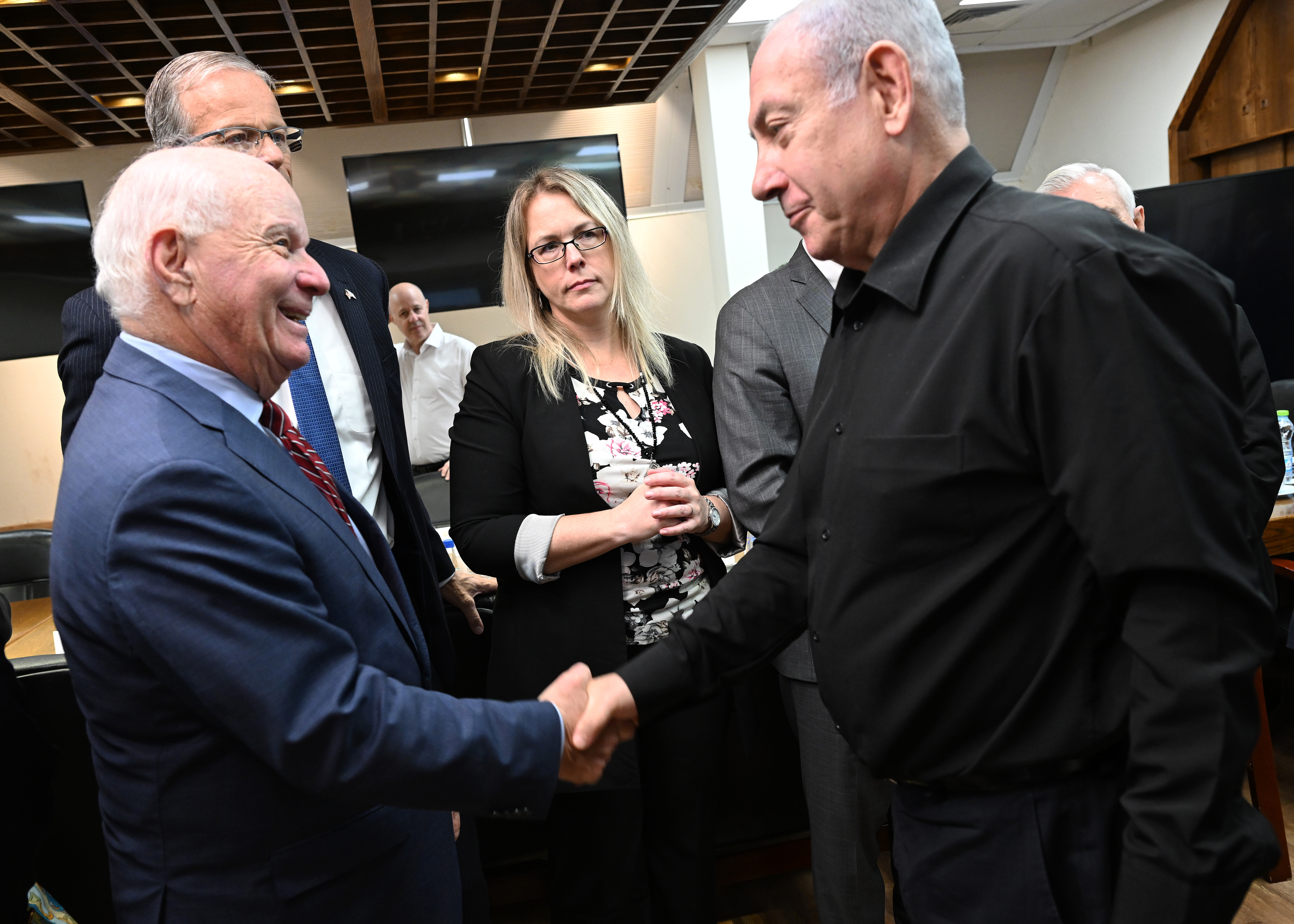
Cardin with Israeli prime minister Benjamin Netanyahu in Israel, October 22, 2023

Cardin is a co-sponsor of a Senate resolution expressing objection to the UN Security Council Resolution 2334, which condemned Israeli settlement building in the occupied Palestinian territories as a violation of international law. Cardin said that "Congress will take action against efforts at the UN, or beyond, that use Resolution 2334 to target Israel."

Cardin supported President Donald Trump's decision to recognize Jerusalem as Israel's capital. He stated: "Jerusalem is the capital of the State of Israel and the location of the US Embassy should reflect this fact."

Cardin and Senator Rob Portman (R-Ohio) proposed the Israel Anti-Boycott Act in late 2018 which would make it illegal for companies to engage in boycotts against Israel and Israeli settlements in the Israeli-occupied territories. The bill would expand the Export Administration Act (EAA) to foreign boycotts imposed by international organizations like the European Union, Arab League and the United Nations. Cardin and Portman were strongly in promotion of the bill, and worked to integrate it into larger spending legislation to be signed by then-President Trump.

In January 2024, Cardin rejected Bernie Sanders' resolution that would have required the State Department to report to Congress on any evidence of human rights violations by Israel in Gaza. In May 2024, Cardin stated that "Israel has not violated International Humanitarian Law" and "military assistance to support Israel's security remains in the U.S. interest and should continue."

== Personal life ==
Cardin married high school sweetheart Myrna Edelman, a teacher, on November 24, 1964. They have a daughter, Deborah. Their son Michael died by suicide on March 24, 1998, at age 30.

In 2002, Cardin's 32-year-old nephew, Jon S. Cardin, was elected as a Delegate representing the 11th district of western Baltimore County. With the 11th legislative district overlapping the 3rd congressional district, there were two Cardins on the ticket in this area in 2002. Present at Jon's swearing in was the oldest living former member of the House of Delegates at 95 years of age, Meyer Cardin, Jon's grandfather and Ben's father. Also in attendance was Cardin, who remarked, "The next generation's taking over."

== Electoral history ==
Maryland's 3rd Congressional District election, 1986
Party	Candidate	Votes	%
Democratic	Ben Cardin	100,161	79.11
Republican	Ross Z. Pierpont	26,452	20.89
Total votes		126,613	100.00
Democratic hold			

Maryland's 3rd Congressional District election, 1988
Party	Candidate	Votes	%
Democratic	Ben Cardin (Incumbent)	133,779	72.90
Republican	Ross Z. Pierpont	49,733	27.10
Total votes		183,512	100.00
Democratic hold			

Maryland's 3rd Congressional District election, 1990
Party	Candidate	Votes	%
Democratic	Ben Cardin (Incumbent)	82,545	69.73
Republican	Harwood Nichols	35,841	30.27
Total votes		118,386	100.00
Democratic hold			

Maryland's 3rd Congressional District election, 1992
Party	Candidate	Votes	%
Democratic	Ben Cardin (Incumbent)	163,354	73.50
Republican	William Bricker	58,869	26.49
Independent	James G. Fitzgerald	29	0.00
Independent	Eric Ashelman	3	0.00
Total votes		222,255	100.00
Democratic hold			

Maryland's 3rd Congressional District election, 1994
Party	Candidate	Votes	%
Democratic	Ben Cardin (Incumbent)	117,269	70.98
Republican	Robert Ryan Tousey	47,966	29.02
Total votes		165,235	100.00
Democratic hold			

Maryland's 3rd Congressional District election, 1996
Party	Candidate	Votes	%
Democratic	Ben Cardin (Incumbent)	130,204	67.31
Republican	Patrick L. McDonough	63,229	32.69
Total votes		193,433	100.00
Democratic hold			

Maryland's 3rd Congressional District election, 1998
Party	Candidate	Votes	%
Democratic	Ben Cardin (Incumbent)	137,501	77.61
Republican	Colin Felix Harby	39,667	22.39
Total votes		177,168	100.00
Democratic hold			

Maryland's 3rd Congressional District election, 2000
Party	Candidate	Votes	%
Democratic	Ben Cardin (Incumbent)	169,347	75.66
Republican	Scott Conwell	53,827	24.05
Libertarian	Joe Pomykala	238	0.11
Write-ins		406	0.18
Total votes		223,818	100.00
Democratic hold			

Maryland's 3rd Congressional District election, 2002
Party	Candidate	Votes	%
Democratic	Ben Cardin (Incumbent)	145,589	65.79
Republican	Scott Conwell	75,721	34.21
Total votes		221,310	100.00
Democratic hold			

Maryland's 3rd Congressional District election, 2004
Party	Candidate	Votes	%	±%
Democratic	Ben Cardin (Incumbent)	182,066	63.44%	−2.35
Republican	Robert P. Duckworth	97,008	33.80%	−0.41
Green	Patsy Allen	7,895	2.75%	+2.75
Total votes		286,969	100.00	
Democratic hold				

Maryland United States Senate primary election results, 2006
Party	Candidate	Votes	%
Democratic	Ben Cardin	257,545	43.67
Democratic	Kweisi Mfume	238,957	40.52
Democratic	Josh Rales	30,737	5.21
Democratic	Dennis F. Rasmussen	10,997	1.86
Democratic	Mike Schaefer	7,773	1.32
Democratic	Allan Lichtman	6,919	1.17
Democratic	Theresa C. Scaldaferri	5,081	0.86
Democratic	James H. Hutchinson	4,949	0.84
Democratic	David Dickerson	3,950	0.67
Democratic	A. Robert Kaufman	3,908	0.66
Democratic	Anthony Jaworski	3,486	0.59
Democratic	Thomas McCaskill	3,459	0.59
Democratic	George T. English	2,305	0.39
Democratic	Bob Robinson	2,208	0.37
Democratic	Lih Young	2,039	0.35
Democratic	Blaine Taylor	1,848	0.31
Democratic	Joseph Werner	1,832	0.31
Democratic	Charles Ulysses Smith	1,702	0.29
Total votes		589,695	100

Maryland United States Senate general election results, 2006
Party	Candidate	Votes	%	±%
Democratic	Ben Cardin	965,477	54.21	−9.0
Republican	Michael Steele	787,182	44.19	+7.5
Green	Kevin Zeese	27,564	1.55	n/a
Write-ins		916	0.05	0
Majority		178,295	100.00	
Turnout		1,781,139		
Democratic hold		Swing		

United States Senate primary election in Maryland, 2012
Party	Candidate	Votes	%
Democratic	Ben Cardin (incumbent)	240,704	74.2
Democratic	C. Anthony Muse	50,807	15.7
Democratic	Chris Garner	9,274	2.9
Democratic	Raymond Levi Blagmon	5,909	1.8
Democratic	J. P. Cusick	4,778	1.5
Democratic	Blaine Taylor	4,376	1.3
Democratic	Lih Young	3,993	1.2
Democratic	Ralph Jaffe	3,313	1.0
Democratic	Ed Tinus	1,064	0.3
Total votes		324,218	100

United States Senate general election in Maryland, 2012
Party	Candidate	Votes	%	±%
Democratic	Ben Cardin (incumbent)	1,474,028	55.98%	+1.77%
Republican	Dan Bongino	693,291	26.33%	−17.86%
Independent	Rob Sobhani	430,934	16.37%	N/A
Libertarian	Dean Ahmad	32,252	1.22%	N/A
n/a	Write-ins	2,729	0.10%	+0.05%
Total votes		2,633,234	100.0%	N/A
Democratic hold				

United States Senate primary election in Maryland, 2018
Party	Candidate	Votes	%
Democratic	Ben Cardin (incumbent)	447,441	79.24%
Democratic	Chelsea Manning	34,611	6.13%
Democratic	Jerome Segal	20,027	3.55%
Democratic	Debbie Wilson	18,953	3.36%
Democratic	Marcia H. Morgan	16,047	2.84%
Democratic	Lih Young	9,874	1.75%
Democratic	Richard Vaughn	9,480	1.68%
Democratic	Erik Jetmir	8,259	1.46%
Total votes		564,692	100%

United States Senate general election in Maryland, 2018
Party	Candidate	Votes	%	±%
Democratic	Ben Cardin (incumbent)	1,491,614	64.86%	+8.88%
Republican	Tony Campbell	697,017	30.31%	+3.98%
Independent	Neal Simon	85,964	3.74%	N/A
Libertarian	Arvin Vohra	22,943	1.00%	−0.22%
Write-in		2,351	0.10%	N/A
Total votes		2,299,889	100%	N/A
Democratic hold				

== See also ==
- List of Jewish members of the United States Congress

== Notes and references ==
=== References ===
Political offices
Preceded by John Hanson Briscoe	Speaker of the Maryland House of Delegates; 1979–1987	Succeeded by Clayton Mitchell
U.S. House of Representatives
Preceded by Barbara Mikulski	Member of the U.S. House of Representatives from Maryland's 3rd congressional district 1987–2007	Succeeded by John Sarbanes
New office	Chair of the House Ethics Reform Task Force; 1997; Served alongside: Bob Livingston	Position abolished
Party political offices
Preceded by Paul Sarbanes	Democratic nominee for U.S. Senator from Maryland (Class 1); 2006, 2012, 2018	Succeeded by Angela Alsobrooks
U.S. Senate
Preceded by Paul Sarbanes	U.S. Senator (Class 1) from Maryland; 2007–2025; Served alongside: Barbara Mikulski, Chris Van Hollen	Succeeded by Angela Alsobrooks
Preceded by Alcee Hastings	Chair of the Joint Helsinki Commission; 2009–2011	Succeeded by Chris Smith
Preceded by Chris Smith	Chair of the Joint Helsinki Commission; 2013–2015	Succeeded by Chris Smith
Preceded by Jim Risch	Ranking Member of the Senate Small Business Committee; 2015	Succeeded by Jeanne Shaheen
Preceded by Bob Menendez	Ranking Member of the Senate Foreign Relations Committee; 2015–2018	Succeeded by Bob Menendez
Preceded by Jeanne Shaheen	Ranking Member of the Senate Small Business Committee; 2018–2021	Succeeded by Marco Rubio
Preceded by Marco Rubio	Chair of the Senate Small Business Committee; 2021–2023	Succeeded by Jeanne Shaheen
Preceded by Alcee Hastings	Chair of the Joint Helsinki Commission; 2021–2023	Succeeded by Joe Wilson
Preceded by Bob Menendez	Chair of the Senate Foreign Relations Committee; 2023–2025	Succeeded by Jim Risch
U.S. order of precedence (ceremonial)
Preceded by Bob Menendez as Former U.S. Senator	Order of precedence of the United States as Former U.S. Senator	Succeeded by Judd Gregg as Former U.S. Senator
