= David A. Carden House =

- U.S. National Register of Historic Places
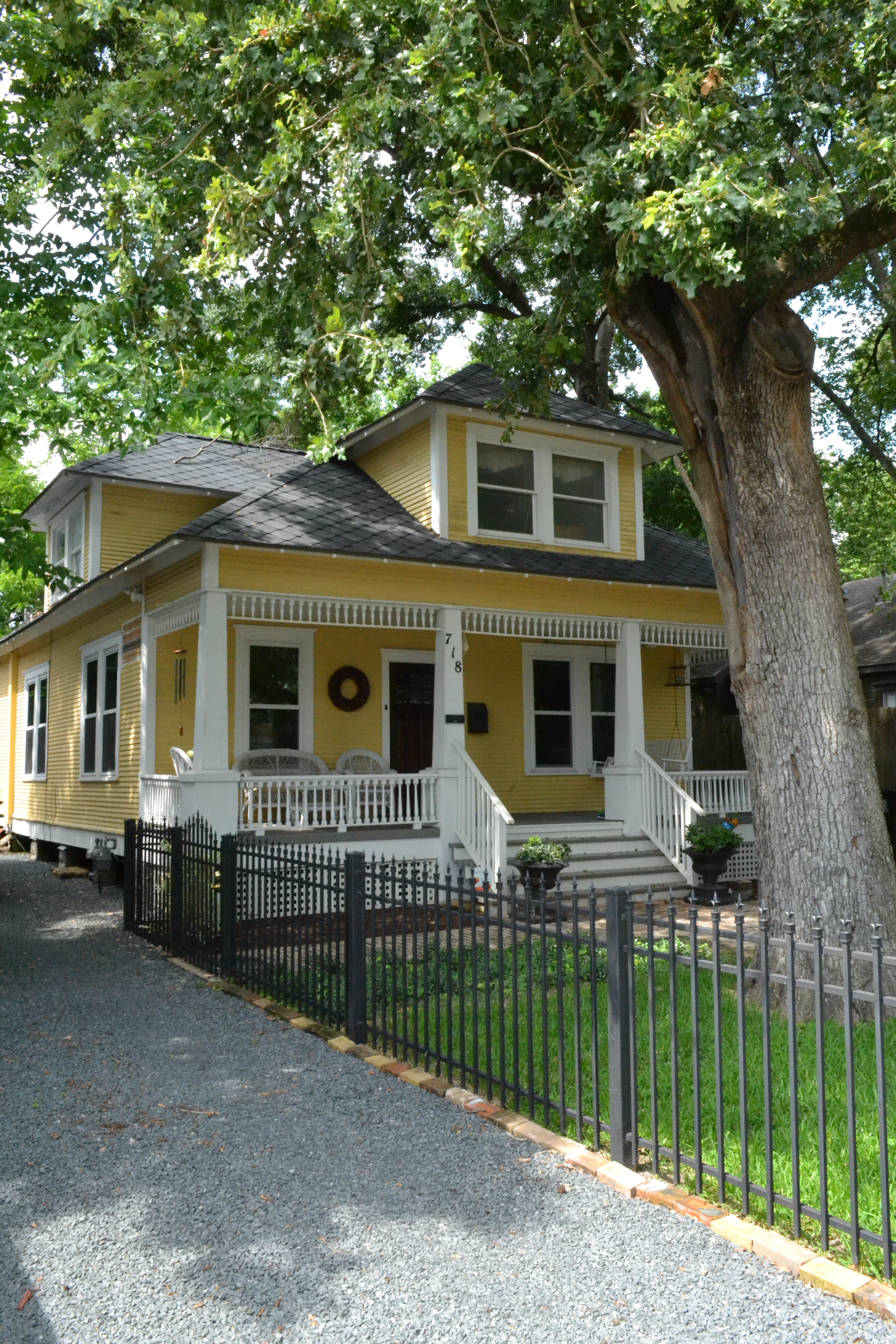

- Location within Texas Location within the United States
- Location: 718 W. 17th Ave., Houston, Texas
- Coordinates: 29°48′02″N 95°24′39″W
- Area: less than one acre
- Built: 1918
- Built by: David A. Carden
- Architectural style: Bungalow/craftsman
- MPS: Houston Heights MRA
- NRHP reference No.: 90001048
- Added to NRHP: July 17, 1990

The David A. Carden House, at 718 W. 17th Ave. in the Houston Heights neighborhood of Houston, Texas, was built in 1918. It was listed on the National Register of Historic Places in 1990.

It is a one-and-a-half-story wood-frame building. Its NRHP nomination states: "The David A. Carden House is an excellent and unique example of an owner-built bungalow in the Houston Heights. Although following certain traditional patterns found in similar designs (ie. hipped roof, dormers, and wide eaves) Mr. Carden borrowed an element from the Victorian styles: the spindled frieze placed along the perimeter of the porch. Echoing this element are the turned-wood balusters. Both assist in making this house a unique statement of owner/builder individuality in the area."
