= Cardan =

Cardan may refer to:

- Gerolamo Cardano or Jerome Cardan (1501–1576), Renaissance mathematician, physician, astrologer, and gambler
- Cornelius Castoriadis (1922–1997), Greek-French philosopher who used the pseudonym Paul Cardan
- Cardan, Gironde, a commune of the Gironde département, in France

== See also ==
- Cardan angle, a type of angle used to describe the orientation of a rigid body with respect to a fixed coordinate system
- Cardan grille, a method of writing secret messages using a grid
- Cardan joint, or universal joint, a joint in a rigid rod that allows the rod to "bend" in any direction
- Cardan shaft, or drive shaft, a vehicle component for transmitting mechanical power and torque and rotation
- Cardan suspension or gimbal, a pivoted support that allows the rotation of an object about a single axis
- Carden (disambiguation)
