= Maurice Cardin =

American politician (1909–2009)

Member of the Maryland House of Delegates from the Baltimore City's 5th district
- In office January 10, 1951 – 1966
- Preceded by: Charles M. Bandiere
- Succeeded by: Ben Cardin

Personal details
- Born: July 19, 1909 Baltimore, Maryland, U.S.
- Died: March 23, 2009 (aged 99) Lake Worth Beach, Florida, U.S.
- Party: Democratic

Maurice Cardin (July 19, 1909 – March 23, 2009) was an American politician who served in the Maryland House of Delegates from Baltimore City's 5th district from 1951 to 1966. His nephew is former Maryland U.S. Senator Ben Cardin, who took over his seat in the Maryland House of Delegates when he retired from politics.

He died of heart failure on March 23, 2009, in Lake Worth Beach, Florida at age 99.
