= The Chattanooga Star =

Newspaper in Tennessee, U.S.

The Chattanooga Star was a daily newspaper in Chattanooga, Tennessee, that was part of Hearst News Services (now Hearst Communications). It was established in 1907 by twelve stockholders, and its first issue was published on January 26, 1907. The editor and manager of the paper was Colonel James Perry Fyffe. Its final publication was on October 10, 1908. The paper's publications are held in the Library of Congress.
