= Nina Beth Cardin =

American writer, activist and rabbi

Nina Beth Cardin is a rabbi, author, and environmental activist. In 1978, she founded the Jewish Women’s Resource Center.

== Rabbinic career and social activism ==
In 1988, Cardin was ordained by the Jewish Theological Seminary, after which she held seminary jobs including Assistant to the Vice Chancellor, Special Assistant to the Chancellor, and Visiting Lecturer in Theology. In 1994, she became the founding associate director of the National Center for Jewish Healing. In 2006, she founded the Baltimore Jewish Environmental Network. From 2007 until 2009 she was general consultant to COEJL, the Coalition on the Environment and Jewish Life. In 2011, she founded the Baltimore Orchard Project, which grows and distributes fruit to the poor in Baltimore.

== Published works ==
Her books include: Tears of Sorrow, Seeds of Hope: A Jewish Spiritual Companion for Infertility and Pregnancy Loss (1999), The Tapestry of Jewish Time: A Spiritual Guide to Holidays and Life-Cycle Events, with Ilene Winn-Lederer (Apr 2000), Rediscovering the Jewish Holidays: Tradition in a Modern Voice, with Gila Gevirtz (Jun 1, 2002), and The Time of Our Lives: A Teen Guide to the Jewish Life Cycle, with Scott Blumenthal (Jun 1, 2003). She has also translated and edited Out of the Depths I Call to You: A Book of Prayers for the Married Jewish Woman, written "Mourning a Miscarriage", a LifeLights™ pastoral care pamphlet, and contributed to the anthology The Women's Torah Commentary: New Insights from Women Rabbis on the 54 Weekly Torah Portions.

== Awards and recognition ==
Jewish Woman Magazine named her one of 10 Women to Watch in 2011.
