= Deutscher Fotobuchpreis =

The Deutscher Fotobuchpreis or German Photobook Prize is an annual group of awards made by a selected jury, with the purpose of celebrating and honoring exemplary projects in the field of visual-led book publishing originated in Germany. Award categories include author, publisher, and graphic designer.

The 2010 jury was: Carolin Ellwanger (Fotofestival Mannheim_Ludwigshafen_Heidelberg); Werner Götze (Lindemanns Fotobuchhandlung, Stuttgart); Hans-Michael Koetzle (Kurator, München); Andreas Langen (Fotograf, Stuttgart); Ulrich Lobstädt (Imageservice Werbeagentur, Stuttgart); Ursula Moll (Galerie Lumas, Stuttgart); Norbert Waning (BFF Bund Freischaffender Foto-Designer, Stuttgart); and Kerstin Weidemeyer (Agentur Foessel Weidemeyer, München).
