= Macky Carden =

American football coach

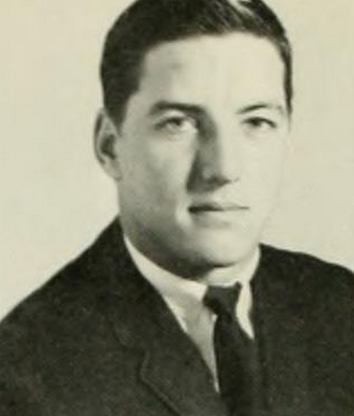
- Carden pictured in Phi Psi Cli 1966, Elon yearbook

Biographical details
- Born: February 12, 1944 (age 82); North Carolina, U.S.
- Education: Elon University (1966)

Coaching career (HC unless noted)
- 1984–1988: Elon

Head coaching record
- Overall: 34–17

Lonnie Mack "Macky" Carden (born February 12, 1944) is an American former college football and collegiate wrestling coach. He serve as head football at Elon University from 1984 to 1988, compiling a record of 34–17. Carden also served as the wrestling coach at Elon. He was inducted into the Elon Sports Hall of Fame in 2008.

== Head coaching record ==
Year	Team	Overall	Conference	Standing	Bowl/playoffs
Elon Fightin' Christians (South Atlantic Conference) (1984–1988)
1984	Elon	7–3	5–2	T–2nd	
1985	Elon	7–3	5–2	2nd	
1986	Elon	8–2	5–2	2nd	
1987	Elon	6–4	4–3	T–3rd	
1988	Elon	6–5	4–3	T–4th	
Elon:		34–17	23–12		
Total:		34–17			
