= William Carden =

William or Bill(y) Carden may refer to:

- William Carden (MP) (by 1524-73 or later), English Member of Parliament
- Bill Carden (footballer) (1886–1962), Australian rules footballer
- Bill Carden (diplomat) (1921–2006), British diplomat and colonial administrator
- Billy Carden (1924–2004), American racing driver
