= Meyer Cardin =

American lawyer and judge (1907-2005)

Member of the Maryland House of Delegates from the Baltimore City's 2nd district
- In office 1935–1939

Personal details
- Born: Meyer Melvin Cardin; July 14, 1907 Baltimore, Maryland, U.S.
- Died: July 12, 2005 (aged 97) Baltimore, Maryland, U.S.
- Party: Democratic
- Children: 2, including Ben
- Education: University of Maryland (LLB)

Meyer Melvin Cardin (July 14, 1907 – July 12, 2005) was an American jurist and politician who served as an associate judge on the Supreme Bench of Baltimore City. He served one term in the Maryland General Assembly and was a member of the Cardin political family. His brother, son, and grandnephew have all been elected to state or national positions.

== Early life and education ==
Cardin was born in Baltimore, Maryland, the son of Anna and Harris Cardin, Russian Jewish immigrants. He grew up in a row house. His parents found employment with a soft drink manufacturer. He attended Baltimore City College and the Army and Navy Prep school. Cardin received his law degree from the University of Maryland School of Law in 1929.

== Career ==
After passing the state bar exam, he partnered with his older brother, Jacob Cardin, in the law firm of Cardin & Cardin. In 1935, Meyer Cardin was elected to the Maryland House of Delegates for a single four-year term, from 1935 to 1939. Cardin was a Democrat.

Cardin's judicial career began in 1955 when he was appointed Baltimore's Chief Police Magistrate. Two years later, he was named Chief Magistrate of the Baltimore Traffic Court. Later he served as Chairman of the Maryland Workman's Compensation Commission from 1958 to 1961, until Governor J. Millard Tawes appointed Meyer Cardin to the Supreme Bench of Baltimore City as an associate judge, a post he held from 1961 until his retirement in 1977. He returned to work in the city's Circuit Court in 1984, continuing to hear cases until 1994, when he was 87.

== Personal life ==
Judge Meyer Cardin met Dora Green, a school teacher, while visiting the Chicago World's Fair in 1933. The couple were married for 36 years until her death in 1972. He had two sons, U.S. Senator Ben Cardin, and Howard L. Cardin. Cardin and his second wife, Sylvia Jacobson, were married for 22 years until her death in 1998.

An active participant in the Masonic community and a 33rd-Degree Mason, Meyer Cardin was a member of St. John's Lodge 34, Yedz Grotto, the Golden Eagle Square and Compass Club and the Scottish Rite.

Cardin died from cancer at his home in Baltimore on July 12, 2005, at the age of 97.
