= Carden Method =

The Carden Method is an educational program developed by Mae Carden and practiced in approximately 80 K-8 schools across the United States. Carden schools are largely nonsectarian and always independent.

== History ==
Mae Carden developed the Carden Method in response to what she perceived as a decline in understanding in progressive education. The first Carden school was established in 1934 in New York City. Mae Carden also established the Carden Educational Foundation, which maintains the collection of teaching materials used in Carden schools.

== Curriculum ==
The Carden curriculum is broad, including traditional subjects such as mathematics, language arts, science, history, and geography, as well as cultural programs in art, music, and French as well as Spanish depending on the school. Each grade level builds on the knowledge and skills gained by the student from the previous year.

Language arts are taught using Sentence Analysis. This also teaches proper sentence structure by reinforcing the fact that all sentences need a subject, called the "Who," and a verb.

Mathematics is taught uniquely as the language of numbers. New concepts are continually introduced, but no concept is ever taught and dropped. Daily problems and tests both cover concepts learned recently and review all the material covered up to that point.

The large majority of the literature recommended by the Carden Method is classical, including works such as The Aeneid, The Adventures of Huckleberry Finn, and The Last of the Mohicans.

In addition to world history, geography is given great importance in order to provide students with a cultural and locational awareness of their world.

Instruction in French and or Spanish begins as early as kindergarten and continues through middle school. Occasionally, students also study Latin beginning in the sixth grade or the beginning of seventh grade. The Latin complements the student's work in French and facilitates the future comprehension of other Romance languages. Study of the Latin language is supplemented by exposure to the Classical world of the Romans and Greeks.

The method has received mixed reviews from education experts, with appreciation for the thorough approach to linguistics, but criticism for the lack of adaptability to modern grammar alterations and alternate vernaculars, some citing it as too rigid, and outdated in respect of modern vernacular, including culturally exclusive vernaculars.

=== Carden Controls ===
Students learn spelling through the Carden "controls", a set of rules for deconstructing a word into its basic phonic parts. The controls are essentially a distillation of classic dictionary marks, but are "presented in such a way that the students are able to remember how and why a word is spelled" and to also explain the reasons why letters are pronounced differently. In addition, the controls are accompanied by a vowel chart, which groups sounds into natural phonic clusters. Spelling instincts are reinforced through daily dictation lessons, which include both familiar and unfamiliar words.

== See also ==
- Montessori method

== Bibliography ==
- Who Was Mae Carden. Heritage Oak Times. November 2005.
- Who was Mae Carden and what is "The Carden Method?". Carden Academy of Maui.
- The Carden Method. Carden School of Whittier.
