= Mae Carden =

American educator (1894–1977)

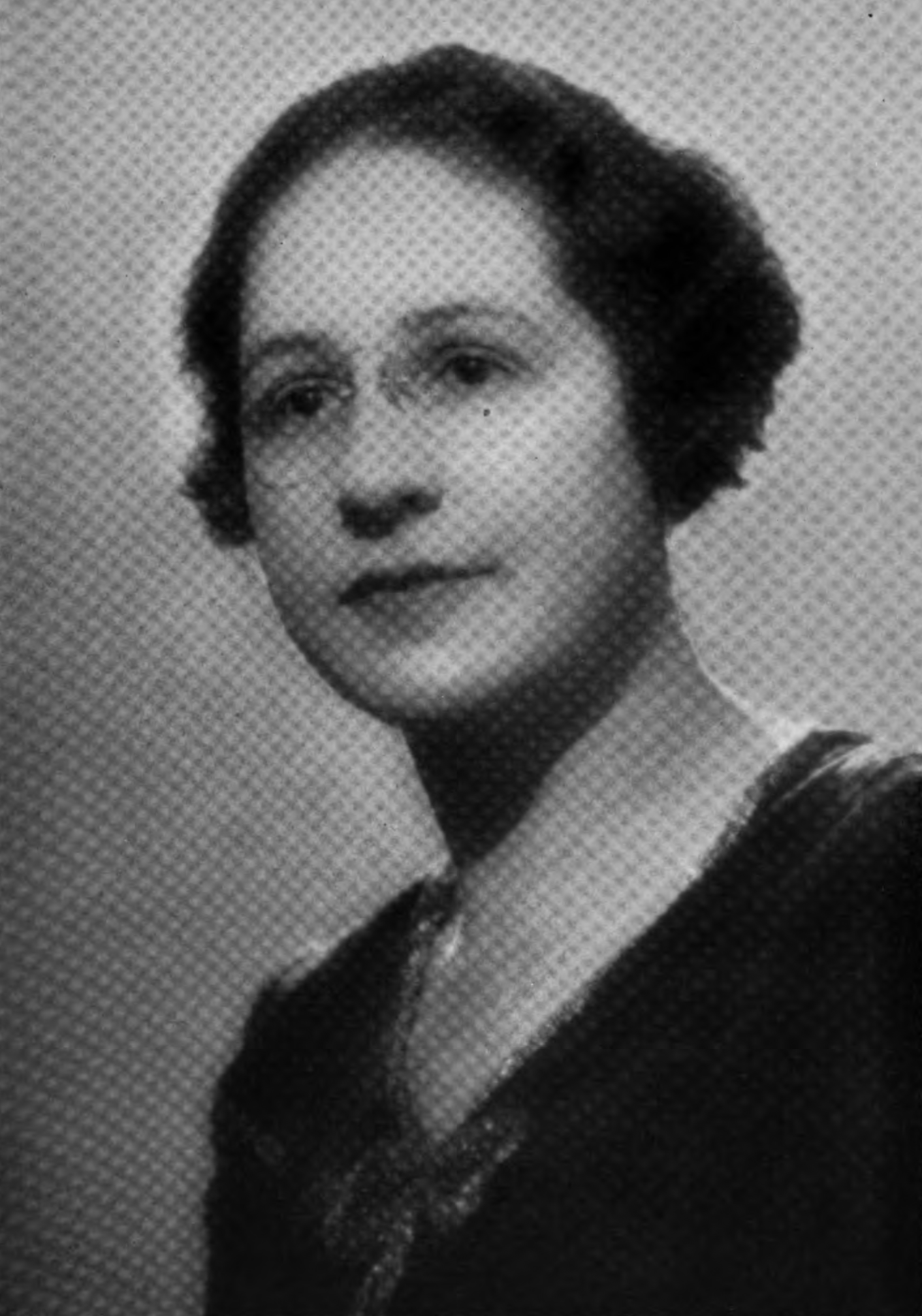
- Carden in 1941
- Born: 1894
- Died: January 1977 (aged 82–83)
- Occupation: Educator
- Known for: Carden Method

Signature
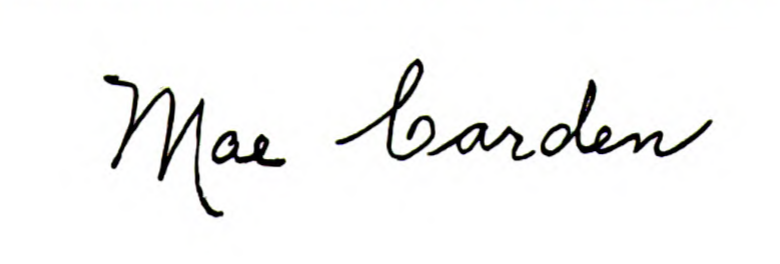

Mae Carden (1894 – January 1977) was an American educator who developed the Carden Method. She created the code for words, and taking apart sentences and knowing how to put them back together. Mae Carden was born in Honolulu and received her primary and secondary education there. She then went on to receive her Bachelor's from Vassar College and her Master's from Columbia University. Throughout her career she emphasized joyful learning; in her own words, "Life is a joy, so should be learning."

== Career ==
Carden established the first Carden School in 1934 at 24 East 68th Street in New York City. In 1935, she moved it to 43 East 67th Street. She demonstrated that children can gain an understanding of their own language and attain the ability to use it correctly when reading, listening, speaking, or writing. Her goal was to teach children to think; her main techniques were analysis and rhythm. Her educational philosophy and teaching techniques became an integral part of the Carden Method. Teachers, students, and parents often shorten the name of this interrelated, eclectic group of approaches to learning, calling it Carden.

In 1949, Mae Carden closed her school in New York City and with close associates, Dorothea Freyfogle and May Crissey, organized Mae Carden, Inc. The new arrangement enabled Mae Carden to give full attention to the use of the Carden Method in other schools.

To assure the continuation of her work, she established The Carden Educational Foundation, Inc., a New York not-for-profit corporation, in 1962. After Mae Carden died in January 1977, aged 82 or 83, the Foundation absorbed all of the activities and purposes of Mae Carden, Inc., and dissolved that organization. All rights, title, and interest in the Carden Method, including Carden and the Carden Curriculum, are vested in the Foundation.
