= Four poster (disambiguation) =

Four poster, Four-Poster, Four-poster, etc. may refer to:

- Four-poster bed
- The Fourposter, a 1951 play by Jan de Hartog
- The Four Poster (film), a 1952 American comedy-drama film based on the 1951 play
- The Four Poster (1964 film), a 1964 Australian TV play based on the 1951 play
- 4-poster or four poster, an automotive test system
- The Four-poster, the English title for Le Lit à colonnes, a 1942 French drama film
