= Red Peppers (TV play) =

1962 Australian TV play

- Ad in SMH 25 Jul 1962
- Based on: plays by Noël Coward
- Directed by: James Upshaw
- Country of origin: Australia
- Original language: English

Production
- Production company: ABC

Original release
- Network: ABN-2
- Release: 25 July 1962 (Sydney)
- Release: 1 August 1962

Red Peppers is a 1962 Australian TV play based on the play Red Peppers. It aired with the play Family Album. Each play ran for half an hour. James Upshaw produced.

They were broadcast on Wednesday July 25, 1962 at 8.30 p.m. on ABM 2. Red Peppers, a telerecording, was shot first, and the live production Family Album followed. It was the first time Noël Coward had been adapted for Australian television, mostly because "it was hard to get the rights," according to Upshaw.

== Cast ==
=== Red Peppers ===
- Lorrae Desmond as Lily
- Colin Croft as George
- Neva Carr Glyn
- Murray Foy
- Henry Gilbert
- Brigid Lenihan

=== Family Album ===
- Lorrae Desmond as Jane Featherways
- Colin Croft as Jasper Featherways

== Production ==
It was Desmond's debut in a straight stage production and followed airing of her own variety show, The Lorrae Desmond Show. She had been in the US. Her co star Colin Croft appeared on her variety show.

"It will be wonderful to be on TV again after night club engagements," said Desmond. "I shall be singing in both comedies hut I am enthusiastic about appearing to a straight play."

== Reception ==
The Bulletin called it "worthy of the highest praise... almost flawless...a delight to watch, if only because it was a breakthrough in local television production. "

The Sydney Morning Herald said "Not even Lorrae Desmond, assisted by a fine _supporting cast and an excellent production... can disguise the perennially unsubstantial quality of Noel Coward's dramatic work" pointing out it was "the first appearance of a Coward play on Australian television, and, one hopes, the last."

The Sunday Sydney Morning Herald thought "Of the two plays, I thought "Family Album" came off a shade better, with acting honours going to Brigid Leniban as the spinster daughter, Lavinia."
