= Chevrolet Volt =

Range extended electric liftback (2010–2019)

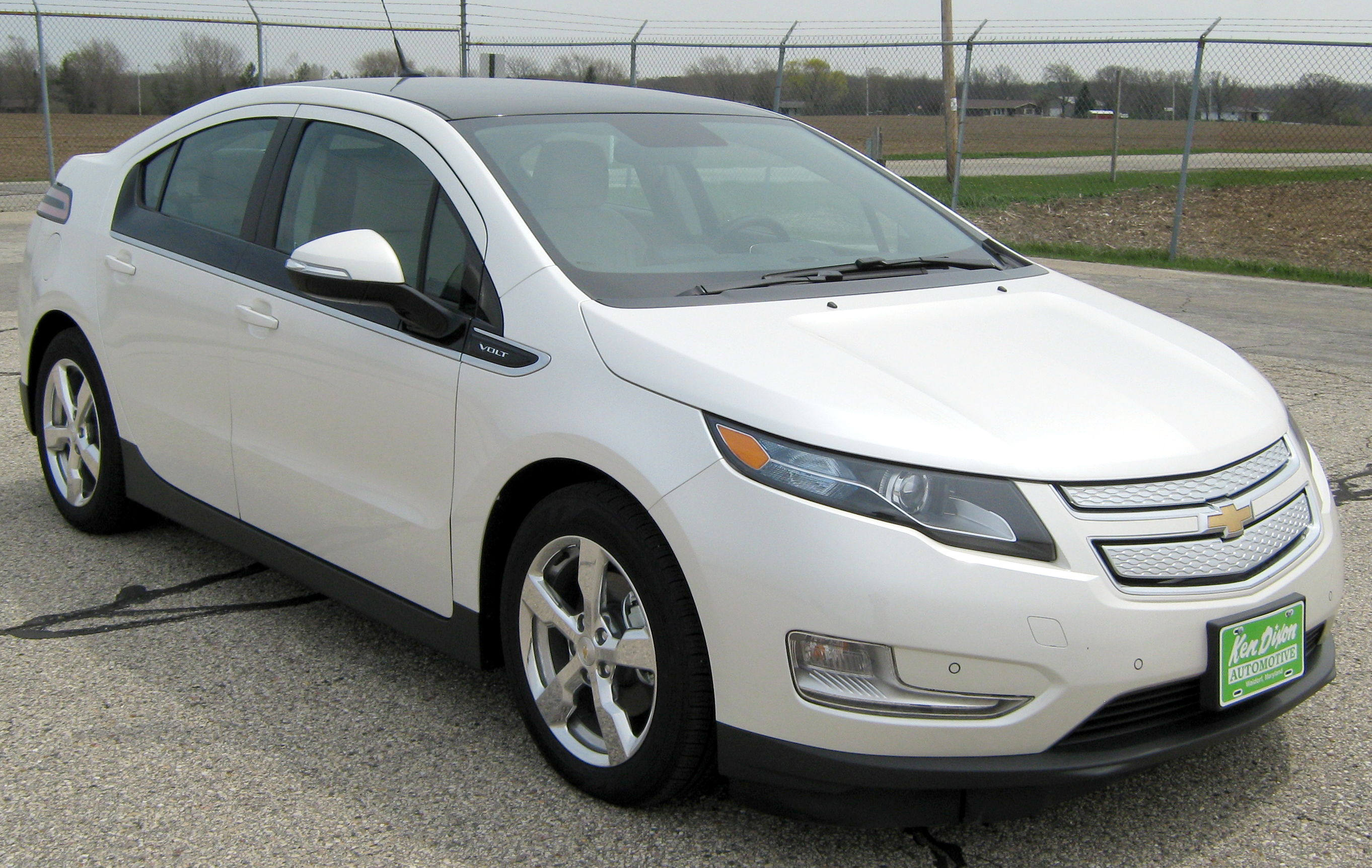
- 2012 Chevrolet Volt

Overview
- Manufacturer: General Motors
- Production: November 2010 – February 2019
- Model years: 2011–2019
- Designer: Jelani Aliyu

Body and chassis
- Class: Compact car (C)
- Body style: 5-door liftback
- Layout: Front-engine, front-wheel drive

The Chevrolet Volt is a plug-in hybrid electric vehicle car that was manufactured across two generations by General Motors, and also marketed in rebadged variants as the Holden Volt in Australia and New Zealand and the Buick Velite 5 in China, and with a different fascia as the Vauxhall Ampera in the United Kingdom and as the Opel Ampera in the remainder of Europe. Volt production ended in February 2019. While similar in some ways to hybrid vehicles, the Chevy Volt is an electric car with an onboard gasoline generator.

Sales of the first-generation Volt began in the United States in mid-December 2010, followed by some European countries and other international markets in 2011. Global combined Volt/Ampera-family sales totaled about 177,000 units by the end of October 2018. The U.S. was the leading market, with 157,054 Volts delivered through the end of 2019, followed by Canada with 16,653 Volts sold through September 2018. Just over 10,000 Opel/Vauxhall Ampera cars had been sold in Europe as of June 2016. Until December 2018, the Volt/Ampera family of vehicles was the world's bestselling plug-in hybrid vehicle. When it was discontinued, the Chevrolet Volt was still listed as the top-selling plug-in hybrid in the American market.

The Volt operates as a pure battery electric vehicle until its battery capacity drops to a predetermined threshold from full charge. From there, its internal combustion engine powers an electric generator to extend the vehicle's range as needed. While running on gasoline at high speeds the engine may be mechanically linked (by a clutch) to the car's gearbox, improving efficiency by 10% to 15%. The Volt's regenerative braking also contributes to the on-board electricity generation. Under the United States Environmental Protection Agency (EPA) cycle, the 2013‍–‍15 model year Volt all-electric range is 38 mi (61 km), with a combined electric mode/gasoline-only rating of 62 mpg_{‑US} (3.8 L/100 km; 74 mpg_{‑imp}) equivalent (MPG equivalent).

The second-generation Volt's improved battery system and drivetrain increased the all-electric range to 53 miles (85 km), its EPA-rated fuel economy in charge-sustaining mode to 42 mpg_{‑US} (5.6 L/100 km; 50 mpg_{‑imp}), and the combined city/highway fuel economy in all-electric mode to 106 MPG-e, up from 98 MPG-e. Deliveries to retail customers in the U.S. and Canada began in October 2015 as a 2016 model year.

The Volt won several awards, including the 2009 Green Car Vision Award, 2011 Green Car of the Year, 2011 North American Car of the Year, 2011 World Green Car, 2011 SAE Best engineered car, 2012 European Car of the Year, and 2016 Green Car of the Year.

== First generation (2010–2015) ==
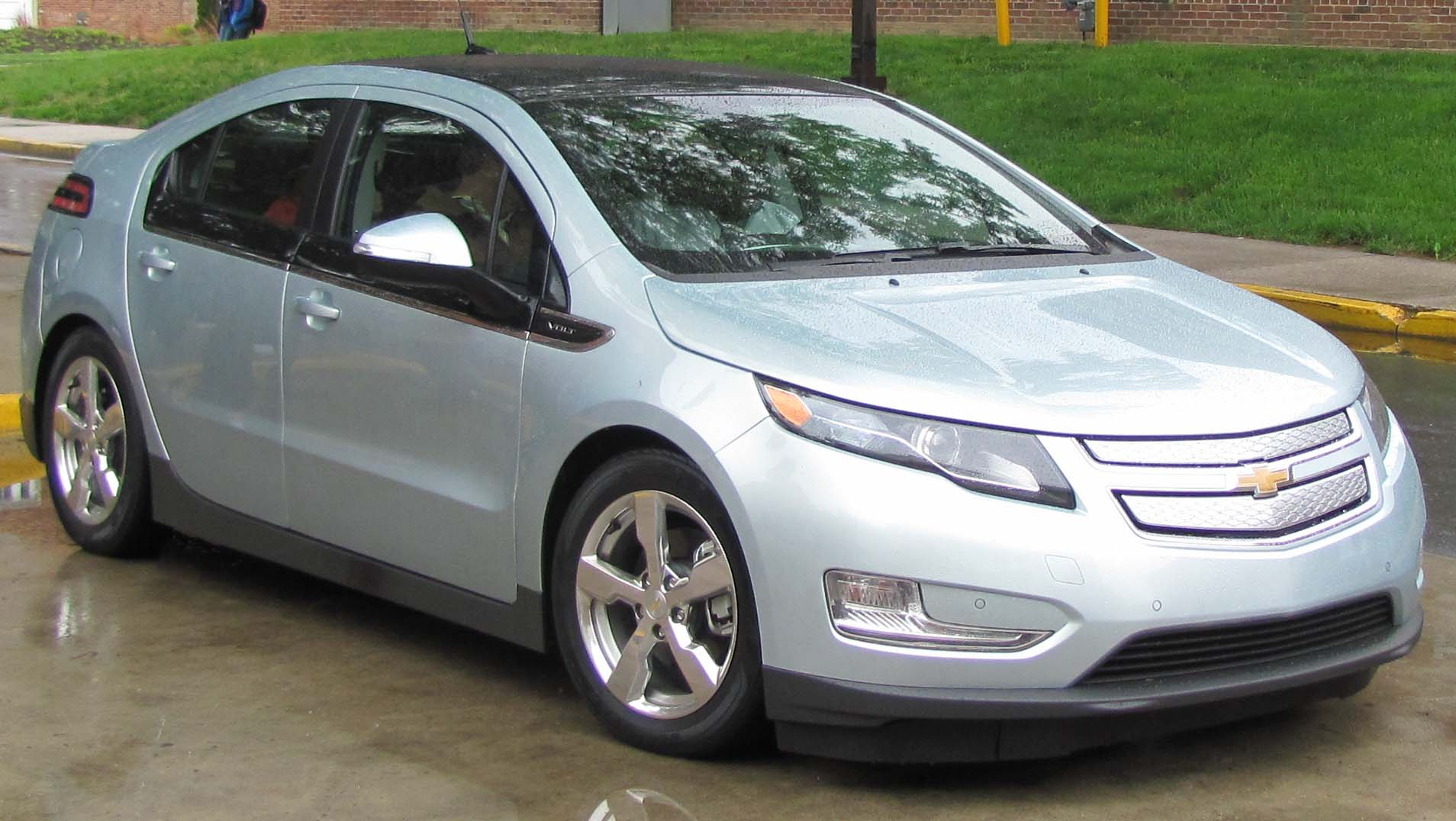

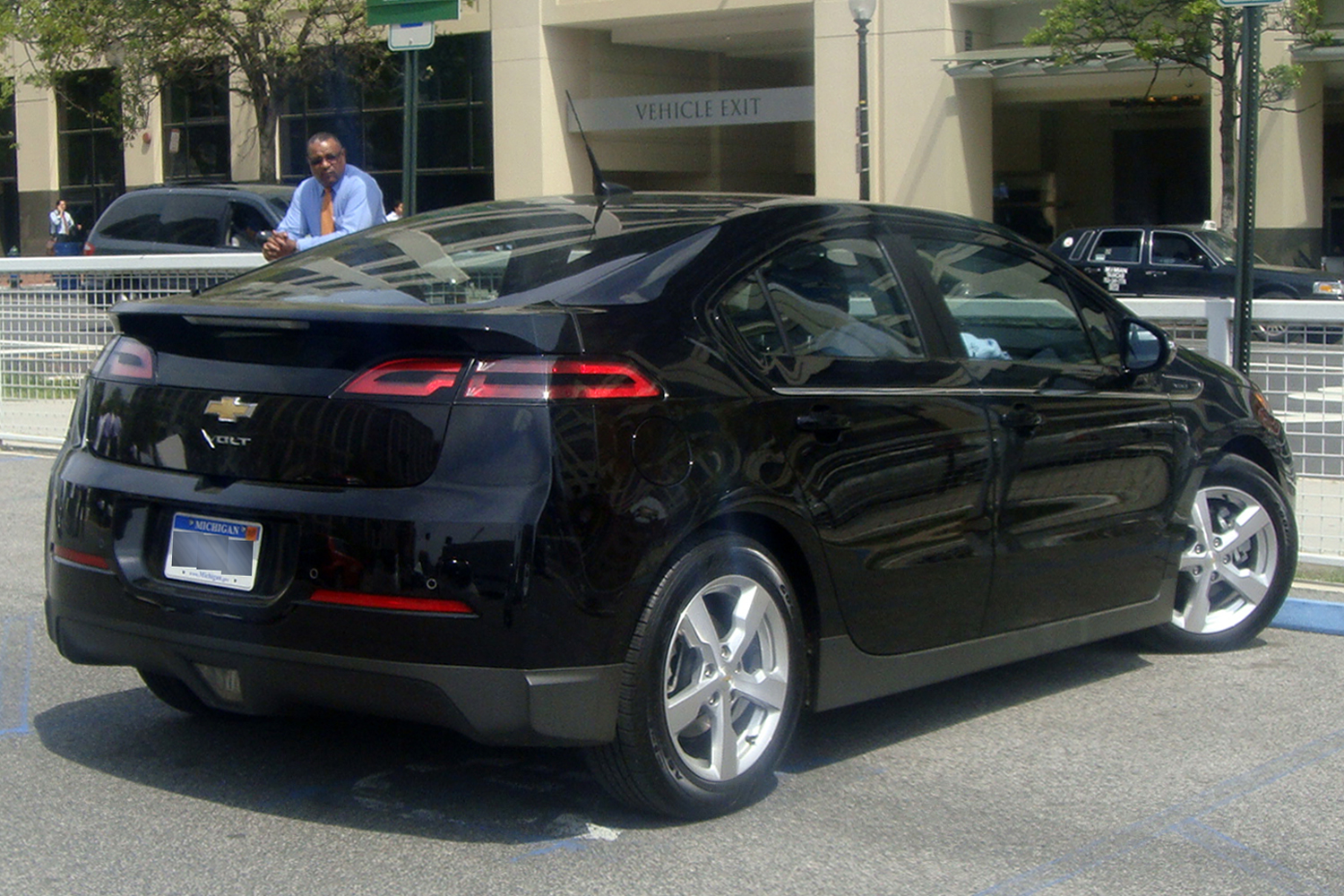
2011 Chevrolet Volt

The production design model officially unveiled on September 16, 2008, as part of General Motors (GM) centennial celebration at the Wintergarden headquarters in Detroit. The production model differed greatly in design from the original concept car. The carmaker cited necessary aerodynamic changes needed to reduce the concept car's high drag coefficient of Cd=0.43 down to Cd=0.28, still higher than the Toyota Prius Cd=0.25. Another reason was the use of General Motors's new global compact vehicle platform Delta II to keep costs reasonable, and shared with the 2010 model year Chevrolet Cruze. Another significant difference from the concept car was the seating, as the production Volt seats four rather than five passengers. This change was due to the higher-than-usual central tunnel that runs from the front console to the rear seat that houses the car's T-shaped battery pack.

After the concept was put into the pipeline for production, GM began looking for a partner to develop the Volt's lithium-ion battery pack. The carmaker evaluated about 25 battery cell chemistries and constructions from around two dozen lithium-ion battery makers around the world. Due to their more promising cell technologies, two companies were selected in June 2007, Compact Power (CPI), which uses a lithium manganese oxide (LiMn_{2}O_{4}) cell made by its parent company, LG Chemical; and Continental Automotive Systems, which uses lithium iron phosphate based cylindrical cells made by A123Systems. By the end of October 2007 CPI (LG Chem) delivered their finished battery pack prototypes, and A123 delivered theirs by January 2008. GM's testing process was conducted at the laboratory the carmaker had created for the GM EV1 program. The battery packs included monitoring systems designed to keep the batteries cool and operating at optimum capacity despite a wide range of ambient temperatures. To ensure the battery pack would last 10 years and 150,000 miles (240,000 km) expected for the battery warranty, the Volt team decided to use only half of the 16 kWh capacity to reduce the rate of capacity degradation, limiting the state of charge (SOC) up to 80% of capacity and never depleting the battery below 30%. GM also expected the battery to withstand 5,000 full discharges without losing more than 10% of its charge capacity. According to GM, as of August 2016, no batteries had been changed due to degradation.

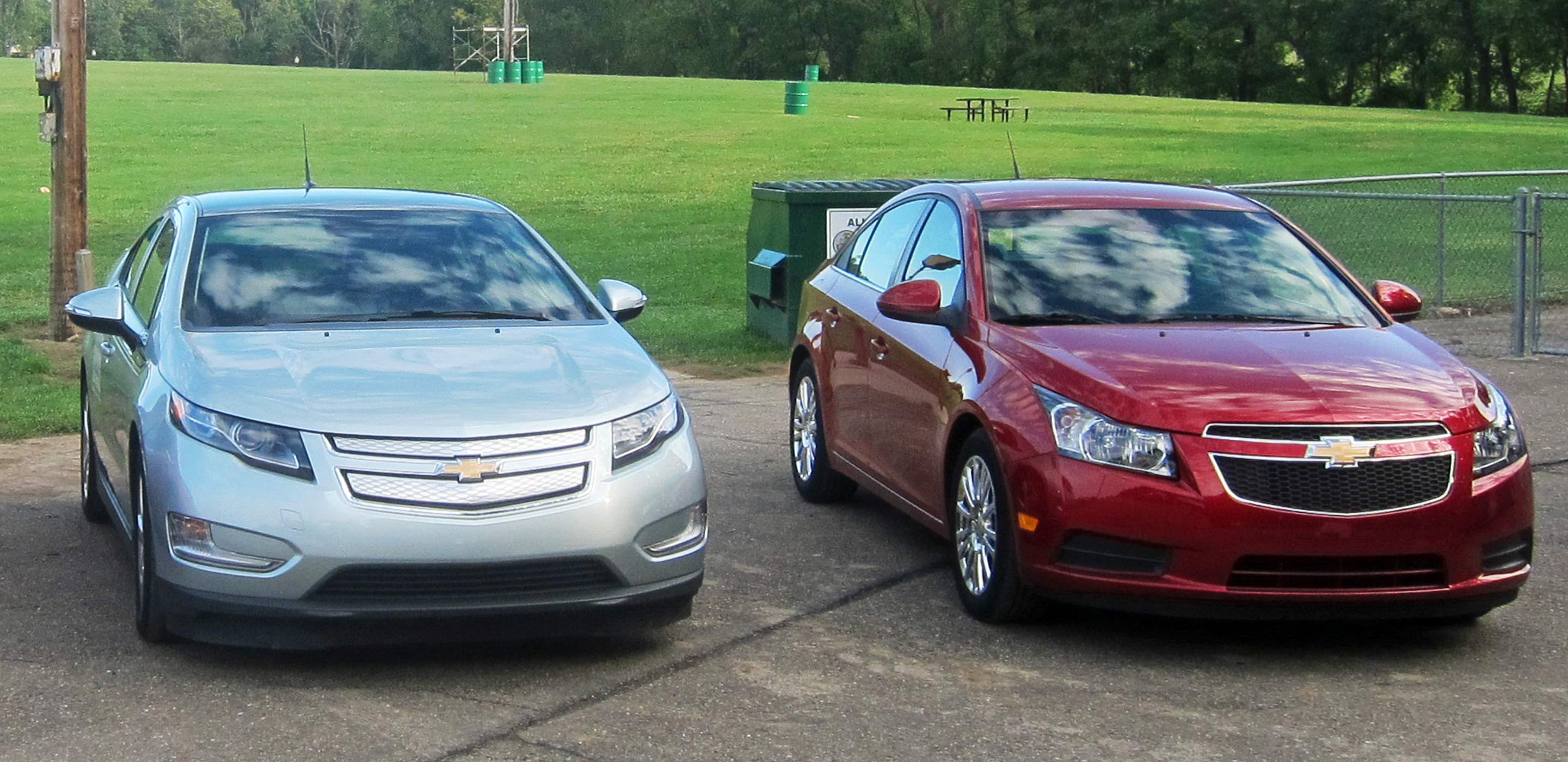
Chevrolet Volt (left) and Chevrolet Cruze Eco (right)

In April 2008 GM started extensive battery testing. In two years, the carmaker put the battery packs to the equivalent of 150,000 real-world miles (240,000 km) and 10 years of use. The durability of the battery pack was tested for a broad range of extreme ambient conditions including a shaker table to simulate potholes and a thermal chamber, to simulate temperatures varying from 116 °F (47 °C), typical of the Southwest deserts, to −40 °F (−40 °C) typical of the Alaskan tundra. In April 2008 the lithium-ion battery pack was placed in Chevrolet Malibus fitted with the Volt powertrain to be used as test mules for further real-world testing. In October 2008, GM chose CPI (LG Chemical) to provide the battery systems for the first production version of the Volt. In July 2008, GM confirmed that a non-turbocharged, 1.4 L 4-cylinder engine would be used as the range extender, and that the intention was to build it in Flint, Michigan. In April 2009, General Motors let journalists test the Volt powertrain without the range-extending generator in the body of Chevrolet Cruze sedans that GM used as test mules at the GM Technical Center in Warren, Michigan.

The first pre-production test car based on the final Volt design was built in June 2009, in Warren, Michigan, and by October 2009, 80 Volts had been built and were tested under various conditions. On March 31, 2010, the first factory-built Volt was produced at the Detroit Hamtramck Assembly Plant to test the production line and for quality control purposes, both of the tooling and the pre-production vehicles produced before regular production began.

Tony Posawatz was the Volt Vehicle Line Director from 2006 to 2012, and he was known as employee #1 and led the team from concept to production.

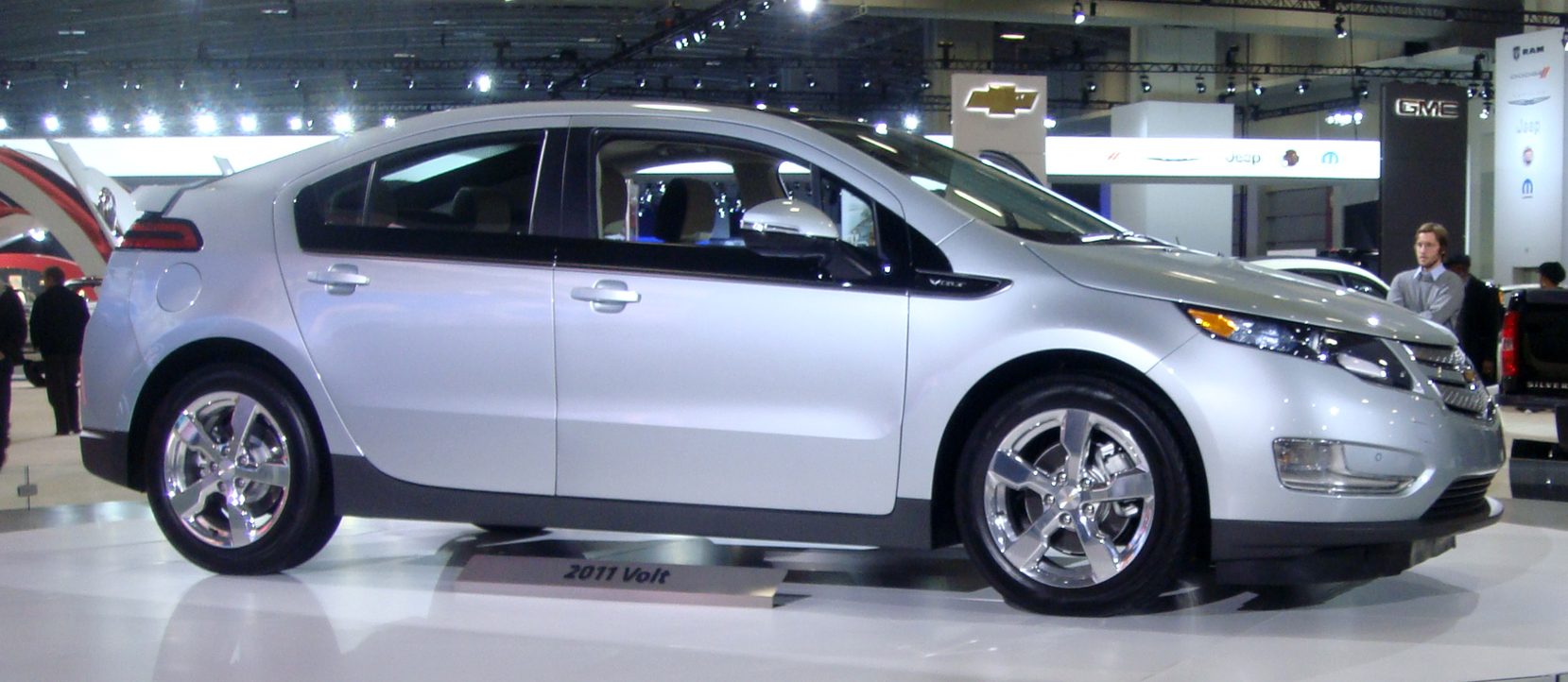
Final production vehicle, the 2011 Chevrolet Volt

General Motors held a ceremony at its Detroit Hamtramck Assembly Plant on November 30, 2010, to introduce the first Chevrolet Volt off the assembly line. The first Volt built for retail sale was earmarked for display at GM's Heritage Center museum in Sterling Heights, Michigan. The second unit was offered at a public auction, with an opening bid of US$50,000 and it was won by Rick Hendrick who paid US$225,000. The proceeds went to fund mathematics and sciences education in Detroit through the Detroit Public Schools Foundation. Deliveries to retail customers in the United States began in mid December 2010. Volt deliveries began in Canada in September 2011. The first deliveries of the Chevrolet Volt in Europe took place in November 2011. The European version of the Volt, the Opel Ampera, was released to retail customers in Europe in February 2012. Deliveries of the right-hand drive Vauxhall Ampera in the UK began in May 2012. The Holden Volt was released in Australia in December 2012.

== Second generation (2016–2019) ==
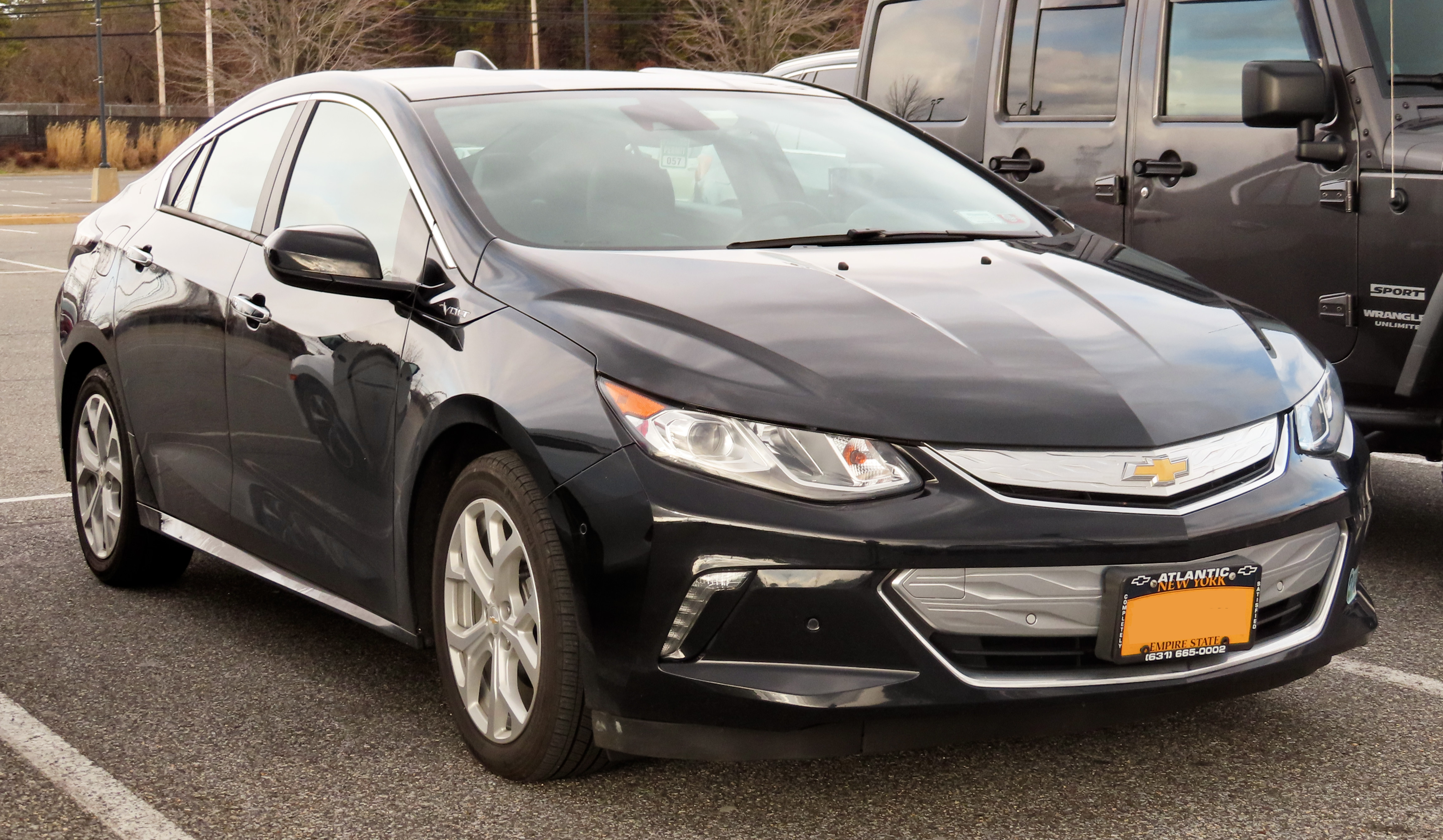

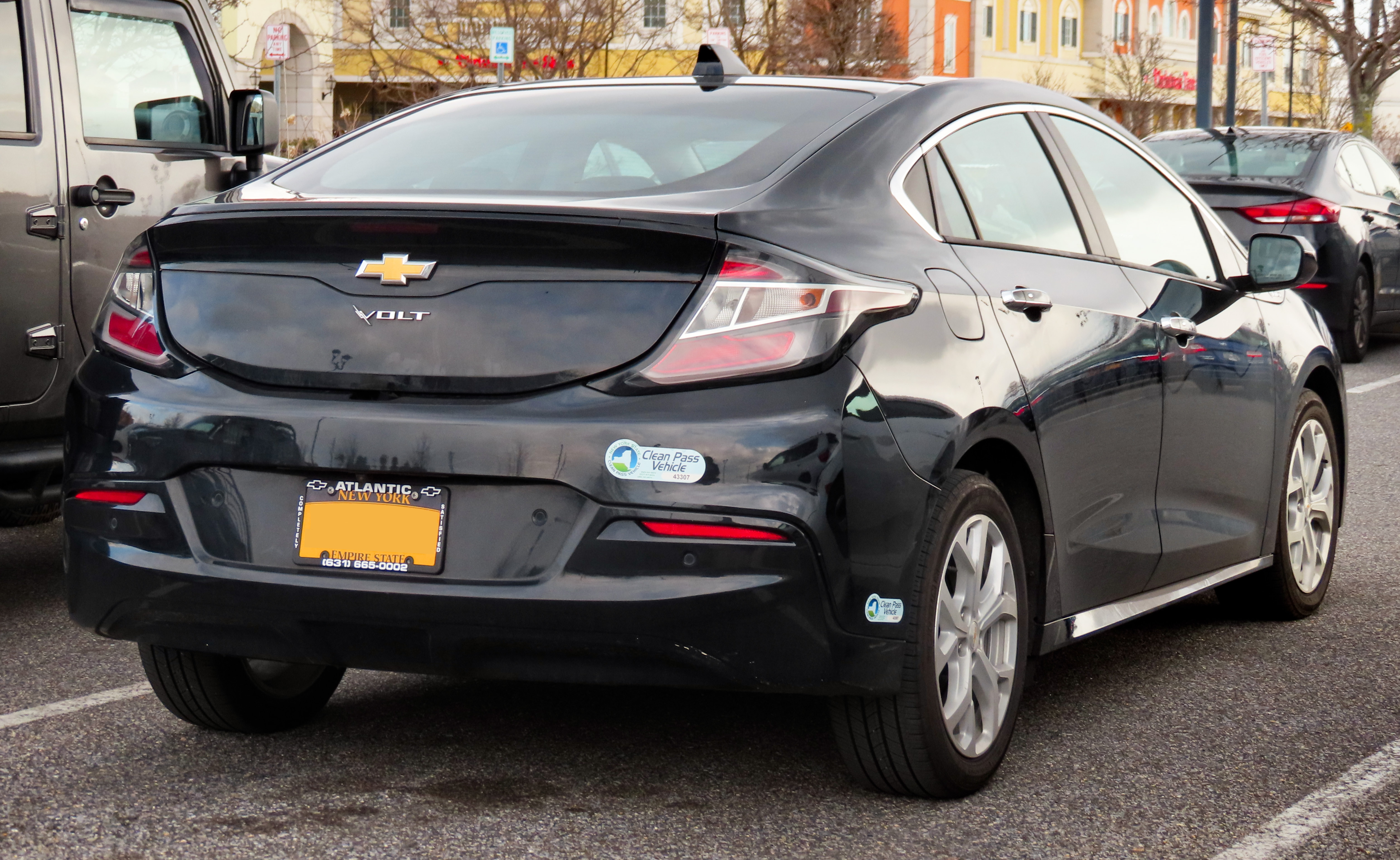
2018 Chevrolet Volt

The second generation Chevrolet Volt was unveiled at the January 2015 North American International Auto Show. Retail deliveries began in the United States and Canada in October 2015 as a 2016 model year, with 1,324 units delivered in the U.S. that month. Availability in the American market was limited to California and the other 10 states that follow California's zero emission vehicle regulations. GM scheduled the second generation as a 2017 model year to be released in the 39 remaining states by early 2016. Manufacturing of the 2017 MY Volt began in February 2016, and the first units arrived at dealerships at the end of February 2016. The 2017 model complied with stricter Tier 3 emissions requirements and was available nationwide.

The second generation Volt had an upgraded powertrain with a 1.5-liter engine that uses regular gasoline; the 18.4 kWh battery pack had new chemistry that stored 20% more electrical energy using fewer cells, 192 compared with 288 on the 2014 Volt. It had a new power controller that was integrated with the motor housing; the electric motors weighed 100 lb (45 kg) less and used smaller amounts of rare earth metals. GM engineers explained that the second generation Volt was developed with extensive input from Volt owners.

The improvements allowed the 2016 Volt to deliver better EPA ratings than the first generation model. The all-electric range was rated at 53 mi (85 km), up from 38 mi (61 km) attained by the 2015 Volt. The gains in efficiency allowed the second generation to improve its combined fuel economy in gasoline-only (charge-sustaining) mode to 42 mpg_{‑US} (5.6 L/100 km; 50 mpg_{‑imp}), up from 37 mpg_{‑US} (6.4 L/100 km; 44 mpg_{‑imp}) for the previous model. The second generation rating for combined city/highway fuel economy in all-electric mode was 106 miles per gallon gasoline equivalent (MPGe; 2.2 Le/100 km), up from 98 MPGe (2.4 Le/100 km) for the 2015 first generation model. The combined gasoline-electricity fuel economy rating of the 2016 model year Volt was 77 mpg_{‑US} (3.1 L/100 km; 92 mpg_{‑imp}) equivalent, 82 MPGe (2.9 Le/100 km) in city driving and 72 MPGe (3.3 Le/100 km) in highway. Both the all-electric range and fuel economy ratings are the same for the 2017 model year Volt.

The second-generation Volt seats five rather than four, as in the first generation.

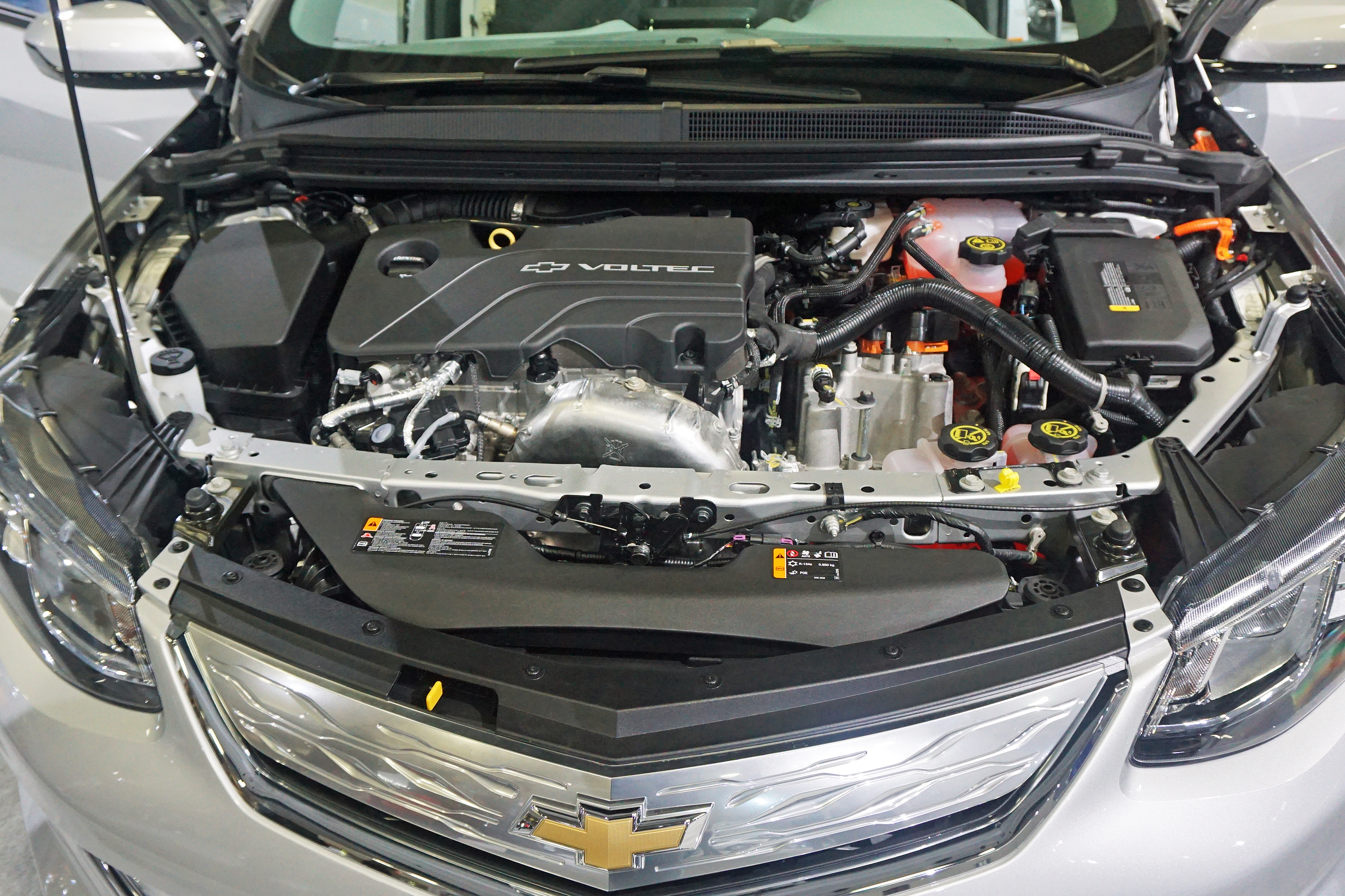
Second generation Voltec 1.5 L gasoline-powered engine (left) and power inverter on top of the traction electric motor (right).

In July 2014, Opel announced that due to a slowdown in sales, they would discontinue the Ampera after the launch of the second generation Volt—and that between 2014 and 2018, Opel planned to introduce a successor electric vehicle in Europe. General Motors announced in February 2016 that the all-electric Opel Ampera-e hatchback would go into production in 2017. This is the European version of the Chevrolet Bolt EV.

In April 2015, General Motors confirmed that it would not build the second-generation Volt in right-hand-drive configuration. Only 246 units had been sold in Australia by mid-April 2015, and the Holden Volt was discontinued once the remaining stock was sold.

== Sales ==
Chevy Volt sales numbers
Calendar year	USA	Canada	Europe (Opel/Vauxhall Ampera)
2010	326	n/a	303
2011	7,671	n/a	5,270
2012	23,461	n/a	3,198
2013	23,094	n/a	939
2014	18,805	1,521	300
2015	15,393	1,463	40
2016	24,739	3,469	
2017	20,349	4,313	
2018	18,306	4,394	
2019	4,910	1,958	
2020	71	9	

== Reception ==
=== Awards and recognition ===
Awards received by the Volt included the following:

U.S. organizations

- 2009 Green Car Vision Award by the Green Car Journal at the Washington Auto Show for "a bold and far-reaching approach that promises to bring an exceptionally fuel efficient model to consumers at reasonable cost."
- 2011 Car and Driver Ten Best Cars. For the first time ever Car and Driver magazine included an electrically powered car among its 10 best.

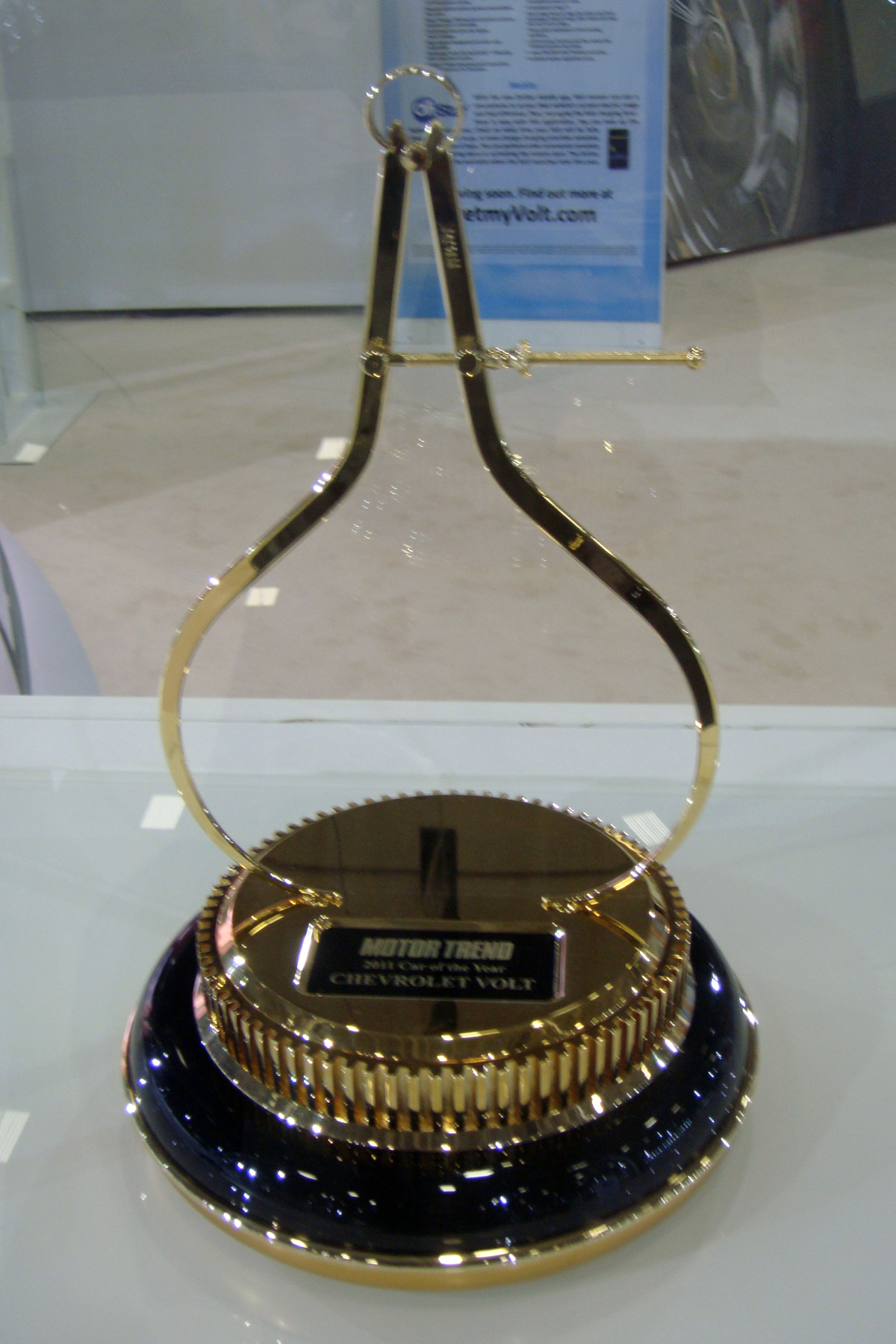
The Chevrolet Volt won the 2011 Motor Trend Car of the Year award.

- 2011 Motor Trend Car of the Year. The magazine commented that "In the 61-year history of the Car of the Year award, there have been few contenders as hyped – or as controversial – as the Chevrolet Volt."
- 2011 Green Car of the Year by Green Car Journal. The magazine editors explained that "This award welcomes a new genre of mass-production electric vehicles to the consumer market, with the Volt as the first-ever electric vehicle to take top prize."
- 2011 Automobile of the Year by Automobile Magazine. The editors commented that the Volt "...is genuinely an all-new car, in the most simplistic sense as well as in the greater notion that the Volt is unlike any vehicle we have ever driven."
- 2011 North American Car of the Year announced at the 2011 North American International Auto Show. Forty-nine American and Canadian automobile writers chose the Volt. The nominees were judged based on "innovation, design, safety, handling, driver satisfaction and value".
- Listed among the 2011 Greenest Vehicles of the Year by the American Council for an Energy-Efficient Economy.
- Listed among the 2011 Best Green Cars by Mother Earth News.
- 2011 Edison Award – Gold in the Transportation Category, Personal Transportation Segment.
- 2012 Best Resale Value Award in the category of electric cars by Kelley Blue Book.
- 2011 The Volt ranked first in Consumer Reports' list of owner-satisfaction based on its 2011 Annual Auto Survey, with 93% respondents who owned the Volt saying they definitely would purchase that same vehicle again. The magazine noted that the Volt had been on sale for just a few months at the time of the survey, and also clarified that the survey took place before the National Highway Traffic Safety Administration investigation regarding the Volt's battery fire risk.
- 2012 Total Cost of Ownership Award in the electric car category, granted by Kelley Blue Book for the lowest projected costs during the initial five-year ownership period in its category.
- 2012 The Volt ranked first, for the second year in a row, in Consumer Reports' list of owner-satisfaction based on its 2012 Annual Auto Survey, with 92% respondents who owned the Volt saying they definitely would purchase that same vehicle again.
- 2016 Green Car of the Year by Green Car Journal (awarded to the second generation Volt). The Chevrolet Volt is the first model to receive this award more than once.

International organizations

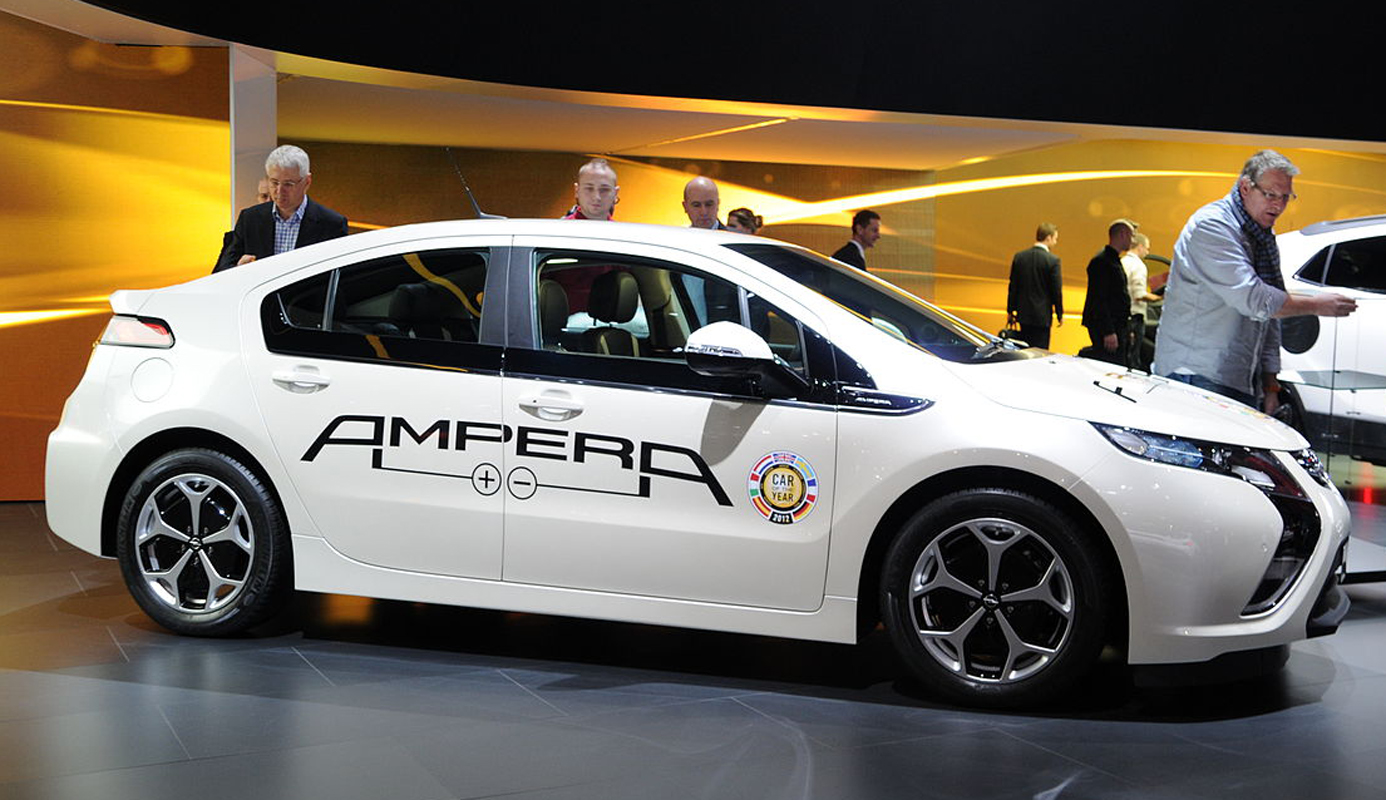
Opel Ampera exhibited with the 2012 European Car of the Year logo at the Geneva Motor Show

- 2009 Festival Automobile International awarded the Grand Prize for Environment to the Volt.
- 2011 World Green Car announced at the 2011 New York Auto Show.
- 2012 International Engine of the Year Award in the category of Green Engine, shared by the Opel Ampera and the Chevrolet Volt for their 1.4 L engine-based extended-range electric powertrain.

European organizations

- 2011 Overall Winner of What Car? Green Awards, granted by the UK magazine to the Vauxhall Ampera.
- 2011 Top Gear's "Green Car of the Year 2011" to the Vauxhall Ampera.
- 2012 Car of the Year in Denmark. In October 2011, 18 Danish motor journalists chose the Opel Ampera as "Car of the Year 2012" by a wide margin, despite being more expensive than the family cars the award usually goes to.
- 2012 European Car of the Year, shared by the Chevrolet Volt and the Opel/Vauxhall. The Ampera/Volt became the first car developed in the U.S. to win this European award.
- 2013 Green Mobility Trophy. Readers of Auto Zeitung in Germany awarded the Opel Ampera the trophy and named the mid-size sedan the best electric vehicle.

Rest of the world organizations

- 2012 Drive's Green Innovation Award to the Holden Volt, as part of the Australia's Drive Car of the Year Awards.

== See also ==
- Cadillac ELR
- Chevrolet Spark EV
- Chevrolet Bolt
- EV Project
- General Motors EV1 – all-electric car from the 1990s
- General Motors XP-883 – plug-in hybrid from 1969
- General Motors Hy-wire – hydrogen powered
- General Motors Sequel – hydrogen powered
- Government incentives for plug-in electric vehicles
- List of bestselling automobiles
- List of modern production plug-in electric vehicles
- Magna International
- Opel Flextreme – Diesel plug-in hybrid by Opel
- Revenge of the Electric Car

== Bibliography ==
- Edsall, Larry (2010). Endres, Chris (ed.). Chevrolet Volt: Charging into the Future. Foreword by Bob Lutz (Hardcover ed.). Minneapolis, Minnesota: Motorbooks. ISBN 978-0-7603-3893-3.
- Fletcher, Seth (2011). Bottled Lightning: Superbatteries, Electric Cars, and the New Lithium Economy (First ed.). New York: Hill and Wang. ISBN 978-0-8090-3053-8.
- Rafinejad, Dariush (2013). "Chevrolet Volt: A Disruptive Innovation Bridge to Electrified Transportation" (PDF). San Francisco, California: Presidio Graduate School. Archived from the original (PDF) on September 27, 2013.
- 2012 Chevrolet Volt Owner Manual (PDF) (First printing ed.). United States: General Motors. 2011. Part no. 20819515 A. Archived from the original (PDF) on October 20, 2013. -->
