= GM Stir-Lec I =

The General Motors Stir-Lec I was a concept hybrid electric car based on the Opel Kadett body in 1969. The power plant consists of 14 lead-acid batteries in the front of the car which transfer energy to a rear-mounted 3 phase electric induction motor, in turn driving the rear wheels. The Stir-Lec I had a top speed of 55 mph (89 km/h). While the car is running, the batteries are constantly recharged by a small Stirling engine in the rear. The engine was allegedly so quiet it was hard to determine if it was running or not, just by sound. Since the Stirling is an external combustion engine, the exhaust has virtually no odor and pollution levels can be made very low.

Another hybrid electric car GM experimented with in 1969 was the XP-883 which featured a similar, but reversed drive line to the Stir-Lec I (using front-wheel drive, with a front-mounted motor and engine, along with rear-mounted batteries).

The Stirling was successfully tested in an Opel Kadett and an AMC Sprint. The clean exhaust of this engine was due to its "continuous and controllable combustion process." It was reported that a fuel efficiency of better than 70 miles per gallon could be realized for a 3,500-pound car. Congressional testimony also asserted, in 1980: ..."if the engine is switched one for one for a 1980 internal combustion engine, a 30% improvement will be realized."

And in 1984: "These engines met or exceeded the miles-per-gallon found with standard internal combustion engines and demonstrated environmental acceptability with a variety of fuels including gasoline, diesel, kerosene and alcohol." The Stirling "would propel a vehicle further on a given amount of fuel than any other engine."

• As of 1972, there were several hybrid electric cars developed by major car companies but never produced.

- GM built three experimental vehicles prior to 1972, the Electrovair, Electrovan, and Stir-Lec 1. The Electrovan was a converted GM van which utilized a "hydrogen oxygen fuel cell," and had a maximum range of 100 to 150 miles.
- The 1968 GM "Stir-Lec" hybrid was a "converted 1968 Opel Kadett with a small 8-hp Stirling engine as its battery charging unit." Pollution was almost negligible, top speed 55 mph, range 150 to 200 miles.
