= James Upshaw =

Australian producer and director

- Born: Australia
- Occupations: TV Producer, TV director
- Years active: 1946-
- Known for: The Lorrae Desmond Show

James Upshaw was an Australian producer and director, best known for his work in TV in the 1960s, including the early variety show The Lorrae Desmond Show, which garnered its hostess Lorrae Desmond as the first female recipient of the Gold Logie Award.

== Select credits ==
- Hit Parade (1957) (TV series)
- Bolshoi Ballet (1959)
- Make Ours Music (1959) (TV variety show)
- The Scent of Fear (1960) (TV movie)
- The Lorrae Desmond Show (1960) (TV series)
- The Big Client (1961) (TV movie)
- Red Peppers (1961) (TV documentary)
- The Red Moore Show (1961) (TV movie)
- Don't Listen Ladies (1963) (TV movie)
- Four for the Show (1963) (TV variety series)
- Spanish dance theatre special (1963)
- The Gordon Boyd Show (1964) (TV series)
- The Four-Poster (1964) (TV movie)
- On Stage (1964) (TV movie)
- The Big Killing (1965) (TV movie)
- Off the Peg (1965) (TV Series)
- Petrushka (1966) (TV ballet)
- Three Cornered Hat (1966) (ballet)
