= Outpost (1959 film) =

- Written by: John Cameron
- Directed by: Christopher Muir
- Country of origin: Australia
- Original language: English

Production
- Production company: ABC

Original release
- Network: ABC
- Release: 18 November 1959 (Melbourne) (live)
- Release: December 1959 (Sydney) (taping)
- Release: 15 December 1959 (Brisbane)

Outpost is a 1959 Australian television play about Australian soldiers in New Guinea during World War Two. It was written for television by John Cameron.

It was one of the most acclaimed early Australian-written TV plays.

== Plot ==
In September 1943, during World War Two, four Australian soldiers are stranded in an isolated army outpost in New Guinea, waiting for an attack on Buna. The soldiers include Sergeant 'Happy' Adams, Signaler 'Tiger' Lyons and Corporal 'Mitch' Mitchell. Tension builds when McCudden, an arrogant NCO from the air force, arrives, bringing mail for Happy.

McCudden is murdered and the soldiers fear a Japanese attack.

Mitch reads in a newspaper that Happy's wife has died in Brisbane. Happy reveals his wife had been having an affair with another man back home and when relatives found out and threatened to write to Happy, she committed suicide. The men discover photographs of McCudden's girlfriends, who included Happy's wife.

== Cast ==
- Syd Conabere as Signaller 'Tiger' Lyons
- Keith Eden as Sergeant 'Happy' Adams
- Paul Karo as Flight Sgt. Steve McCudden
- Dennis Miller as Corporal 'Mitch' Mitchell
- John Morgan as Signaller 'Baron' Peterswald

== Production ==
John Cameron had been a sergeant in the Australian Army Signal Corps during World War Two. He served in New Guinea at Wanagila, where a secret airstrip was being made in preparation for an attack on Japanese-held Buna, 40 miles away.

Cameron was working as a supervisor of facilities at the ABC in Melbourne at the ABC. He had been involved with theatre since his says at university and said he had the story in mind for many years but was prompted to write it when he heard about the shortage of TV scripts and decided to write his own. It took him eight weekends over June and July and he submitted it under a pen name, "John Alexander". The identity of the writer surprised the ABC.

The production was performed "live" in a Melbourne studio, with the exception of a jungle sequence, which was pre-recorded. It was the first TV performance for Dennis Miller. The director was Chris Muir, made it just before he filmed Albert Herring for the ABC. Muir said he liked the play's "economy of dialogue and mounting tension."

Kunai grass was imported for use in the show. Bananas were bought especially from Queensland. The Australian Army provided firearms including Owen guns, Tommy guns and rifles

== Reception ==
The Sydney Morning Herald said:

The author makes no better than commonplace use of the clever idea... playwright and play could have been helped by clevered hints of the general heat malaise, crawling fear and eginess of jungle fighting from producer Christopher Muir, whose imagination never rose above neat routine. The cast performed creditably, powerful or rich playing being excluded for the most part by flat, everyday commonplace of the dialogue... Paul Karo's portrait... was much too overdone to be convincing, but there was much conviction in the performance of young and intense Denis Miller and sufficient conviction in the work of his more experienced co players.

Cameron went on to write the television plays The Teeth of the Wind (1962), Otherwise Engaged (1965), and The Quiet Season (1965).

== US screening ==
The play was bought for screening in the US by CBS in 1961 along with another Australian play, The Scent of Fear. The two dramas screened on June 18, 1961 in several key markets including New York, Los Angeles, Philadelphia, Chicago and St Louis.

The New York Times wrote that "unfortunately Mr Cameron telegraphed his resolution early in the drama and also greviously overtaxed the element of coincidence. But the settings and direction were first rate."

== See also ==
- List of live television plays broadcast on Australian Broadcasting Corporation (1950s)
