= Lorrae Desmond =

Australian actress (1929–2021)

Lorrae Desmond AM, MBE
- A Country Practice star Lorrae Desmond
- Born: Beryl Hunt; 2 October 1929; Mittagong, New South Wales, Australia
- Died: 23 May 2021 (aged 91); Gold Coast, Queensland, Australia
- Other names: Sheila Hunt; Beryl Gorshenin; Lorrae Gorshenin
- Occupations: Actress; singer; recording artist; television presenter; radio presenter; theatre lyricist
- Years active: 1945–2001 (retired)
- Spouse: Alex Gorshenin (m. 1963–1976)
- Awards: Member of the Order of the British Empire; Logie 1984 – Best Supporting Actress in a Series for: A Country Practice (1981); Gold Logie (1962)

Lorrae Desmond (born Beryl Hunt; 2 October 1929 – 23 May 2021) (Note: Desmond's age was corrected when awarded in the Australia Day honours in 2021, which gave her as then being 91 years old, hence a birth year of 1929; other official sources had previously given her birth year as 1932.) was an Australian Gold Logie-award-winning variety entertainer whose career as a pop and jazz singer, lyricist, recording artist, radio and television presenter, media personality, actor, cabaret, pantomime and theatre performer and playwright and set designer, spanned over 55 years starting from the post WII years, both locally in the United Kingdom and Australia. Desmond was known as the Forces Sweetheart for her numerous overseas tours performing for military personnel.

== Early life ==
Desmond was born on 2 October 1929, in the Southern Highlands town of Mittagong, New South Wales, to Alice and Dr. Desmond Hunt. She left Mittagong after the fire season, and briefly lived on an island on the Great Barrier Reef in Queensland. After leaving Mittagong Primary School, she trained as a hairdresser, but inspired by singer Gracie Fields, decided she wanted to become an entertainer. By the age of 10, Desmond had travelled to Britain with her family.

== Career ==
=== United Kingdom ===
Desmond started her career in post-WWII England in 1945, as a singing cigarette girl, and became a celebrity there.

Desmond carved out a career as a variety performer, in the vein of entertainer Cicely Courtneidge, both a solo artist and with backing group 'The Rebels' (sometimes credited as 'Lorrae Desmond and The Rebels'). She made studio recordings, and featured in theatre, cabaret and pantomime. In 1957, Desmond competed in the second semi-final of the Festival of British Popular Songs, where the winner got to participate in the Eurovision Song Contest.

Desmond also presented her own radio shows, primarily at the BBC during World War II, including Meet Lorrae and Swing with Lorrae.

Desmond also featured in her own comedy television series Trouble for Two in 1958, and was in the cast of several of the Terry-Thomas TV specials.

=== Australia ===
Returning to Australia, Desmond's career kicked off in 1960, as presenter of the self-titled music variety show The Lorrae Desmond Show. In 1961, she made history by being the first woman on television to win the Gold Logie (which was in fact Silver, as women at the time received the silver statuette, and men received the gold statuette). The Gold Logie award that year was a dual honour, with Tommy Hanlon Jr. also winning the coveted trophy.

She next appeared in the television play Red Peppers in 1962.

The Australian Government invited Desmond to tour South Vietnam with the Entertainment Unit from 1967 to 1971, to entertain the troops. She was widely courted as being an Australian Forces Sweetheart, alongside Dinah Lee, Little Pattie, Cathy Wayne, Sylvia Raye, Lynne Fletcher and Jacqui De Paul. Australia didn't have its own honours system at the time, however Desmond was appointed a Member of the Order of the British Empire (MBE) in 1970 for services to "entertainment and the welfare of the Australian Forces in Vietnam". She also toured the Middle East, Malaysia, Singapore, Kenya and Somalia, where she became known for her live singing performances, in the style of Vera Lynn and Anne Shelton.

As a variety entertainer and vocalist, Desmond made numerous cabaret performances on television, including In Melbourne Tonight, The Graham Kennedy Show, The Kamahl Show, The Ted Hamilton Show and appeared on Parkinson in Australia, and The Jack Benny Show.

Desmond started taking roles in local soap operas and serials starting from the late 1960s, including a guest roles in Crawford Productions staple series Homicide, and Number 96 in 1973. After this, she landed a more permanent role in Arcade in 1980, but the series was unsuccessful and cancelled after 16 episodes.

Desmond then landed her best-known role as Shirley Dean Gilroy in the Seven Network's new series A Country Practice. She appeared from the series' inception in November 1981 until 1992. In 1984, she won the Logie for Best Supporting Actress for the role. In one of the series' iconic episodes in 1992, Desmond decided to leave the series and the long-running character Shirley was killed off in an off-screen plane crash, with the actress stating she did not want a prolonged death storyline arc like that of Molly Jones (Anne Tenney).

Later, in 1997, Desmond had a guest appearance on long-running soap opera Home and Away as Isobel Dupre, the mother of regular character Donald Fisher played by Norman Coburn.

In 2006, Desmond took part in an A Country Practice reunion special, as part of the "Television Turns 50" celebrations, and then the series' 30th-anniversary reunion in 2011. In 2017, Desmond, who was the first female to win a Gold Logie, appeared at the Logie awards to present an award opposite her cousin's son, Chinese Australian actor and presenter Sam Pang.

Desmond toured Australia, performing in a stage production of High Society as well as her own one-woman show.

=== Writing ===
Desmond co-wrote the lyrics to the musical Man of Sorrows (originally titled Jesus Christ Revolution), which premiered in Melbourne in 1972.

About the industry, Desmond said:

What I really wanted to do was write lyrics for songs. I did do a few weeks in Home and Away after ACP, but I'm a bit sick of performing—after you've been doing it for 50 years you're just going around in circles! The thing I liked most about being a performer was putting the act together, which is why I've come back to writing. It's still pleasant to be recognised as Shirley because people are always nice to me. And with those ACP repeats on Hallmark, it goes from generation to generation.

In 2001, Desmond obtained the rights to write the lyrics for a musical play based on Bryce Courtenay's novel Smoky Joe's Cafe, about the effects of the Vietnam War on a veteran. The play, entitled Honey, premiered in 2007 at the Riverside Theatre Parramatta.

Desmond was also a magazine columnist for That's Life; she wrote an article called "Ask Lorrae", in which readers would write in, asking for advice and information.

== Personal life and death ==
Desmond was married to Sydney surgeon Dr. Alex Gorshenin from 1963 to 1976. They travelled to the United States together, where he continued to study.

Prior to her marriage, Desmond was involved in a long-running affair of several years with the English comic actor Terry-Thomas. In his book Bounder (2008), Graham McCann states that Desmond might have even married Terry-Thomas, who had been her constant companion for ten years. Instead, the actor married Belinda Cunningham, despite a 26-year age gap between the two. Desmond refuted this in an ABC interview in April 2008, saying that whilst she dated Thomas for 10 years, they would never have married.

Desmond died on 23 May 2021, in Gold Coast, Queensland, aged 91.

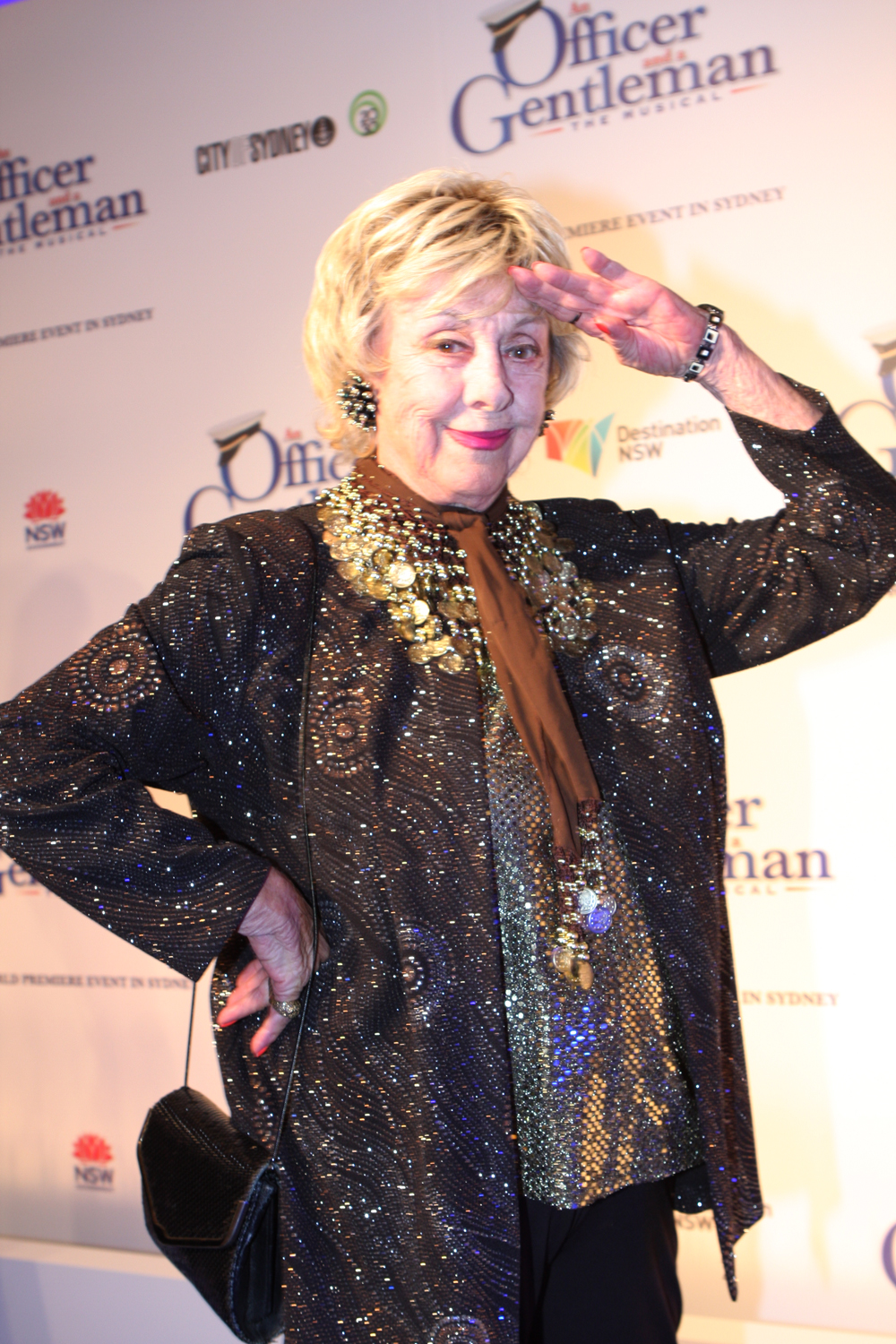

== Awards ==
Year	Association	Category	Work	Result
1962	Logie Awards	Gold Logie Award for Most Popular Personality on Australian Television	The Lorrae Desmond Show	Won
1984	Logie Awards	Silver Logie Award – Best Supporting Actress In A Series	A Country Practice	Won
2009	Mo Awards	John Campbell Fellowship Award	Lorrae Desmond	Won

== Honours ==
Year	Honour	Awarded for
1970	Member of the Order of the British Empire (MBE)	For services to entertainment and the welfare of the Australian Forces in Vietnam
2021	Member of the Order of Australia	For significant service to the performing arts as an actor, entertainer and singer.

== Filmography ==
=== Film ===
Year	Title	Role	Type
1955	Stock Car	Singer	Feature film
1964	Muloorina	Self	Short film

=== Television ===
Year	Title	Role	Type
1956	Strictly T-T		
1956	Hancock's Half Hour	Secretary	1 episode
1957	Mostly Maynard		1 episode
1957	Sheep's Clothing	Herself	3 episodes
1958	Trouble for Two		4 episodes
1960–1964	The Lorrae Desmond Show	Host	
1962	Red Peppers	Lily	TV play
1962	Family Album	Jane Featherways	TV play
1968	Homicide	Harriet Murphy	1 episode
1969	Riptide	Madge Scobie	1 episode
1973	Number 96	Marion Carlton	2 episodes
1975	Shannon's Mob	Cassandra	1 episode
1976	The Outsiders	Rose	1 episode
1980	Arcade	Molly Sparks	35 episodes
1981–1992	A Country Practice	Shirley Dean Gilroy	TV series, 816 episodes
1997	Home and Away	Isobel DuPre	16 episodes

== Theatre ==
Year	Title	Role	Venue / Co.
1972	Man of Sorrows (originally titled Jesus Christ Revolution)	Co-writer / lyrics	
2007	Honey	Lyrics (adaptation of Bryce Courtenay's novel Smoky Joe's Cafe)	Riverside Theatre Parramatta

== Publications ==
Year	Title	Role
	That's Life	Magazine columnist ("Ask Lorrae" column)
