= Man of Sorrows (musical) =

Man of Sorrows (originally titled Jesus Christ Revolution) is an Australian musical with music by Enzo Toppano and lyrics by Peggy Mortimer and Lorrae Desmond. The rock musical depicts the life of Jesus Christ, from his birth to his crucifixion and the resurrection.

== Productions ==
The musical premiered under the title Jesus Christ Revolution at the Comedy Theatre, Melbourne on 8 January 1972. The cast included Steve Anthony as Jesus, Erl Dalby as Judas and Una Valli as Mary (as well as a young John Paul Young). It closed after three weeks due to weak audience demand.

The name was changed to Man of Sorrows for a subsequent Sydney production, which opened at the Pitt Street Congregational Centre on 6 June 1972. The cast included Ron Stevens as Jesus, Erl Dalby (from the Melbourne production) as Judas, Jennifer Bailey as Mother Mary and Janet Roberts as Mary Magdalene.

A 1973 New Zealand production featured Rob Guest as Jesus.

A studio recording of the songs "Hail All Hail" performed by Neil Williams, Kerrie Biddell and chorus and "My Boy's Different" performed by Biddell was released in May 1972.
