= The Scent of Fear =

"The Scent of Fear" is television play written by Ted Willis. It was originally written for British anthology series Armchair Theatre, adapted from the story "Stowaway" by Mary Higgins Clark which was reportedly based on a real story that happened in 1949. It was filmed for Australian TV in 1960.

== Plot ==
A youth in an Iron Curtain country, to escape from police, hides in a plane that is to fly to the UK. An air hostess finds him and he begs her not to turn him in. She has to hide him from various policemen.

== 1959 British TV Version ==
"The Scent of Fear"
- Armchair Theatre episode
- Directed by: John Llewellyn Moxey
- Teleplay by: Ted Willis
- Original air date: 1959

The play was first produced by ABC Weekend TV for the British ITV network in 1959.

=== Cast ===
- Anthony Quayle as Colonel Kralik
- Lorenza Colville as Eva Kralik
- Frederick Schiller as Neumann
- Alexis Chesnakov as Pechka
- Neil McCallum as Karl Schling
- Dorothy Tutin as Joan Bridey
- John Carson as Tom Brook
- Barrie Cookson as Harry Mylner
- Jack Stewart as Dusty Fraser
- Jacqueline Ellis as Peggy Court
- Carl Duering as Sten
- Wolfe Morris as Mueller
- David Ritch as Brandt
- Walter Gotell as 1st Policeman
- Jan Conrad as 2nd Policeman

== 1960 Australian TV Version ==
The Scent of Fear
- Written by: Ted Willis
- Directed by: James Upshaw

Original release
- Release: 7 September – 3 November 1960

The Australian version was directed by James Upshaw. Broadcast live on ABC's Sydney station, it was kinescoped ("telerecorded") for showing on other ABC stations.

It was one of several thrillers filmed in the early days of Australian television.

=== Cast ===
- Max Meldrum as the youth
- Eric Reiman as Colonel Kralik
- Diana Perryman as Joan Bridey, the hostess
- Owen Weingott as Sten, disguised Communist head of police
- Deryck Barnes
- Brian Anderson
- Colin Croft
- Noni Rathesay
- Carlotta Kalmar
- Leonard Teale
- George Roubiceck
- Kenneth Hacker
- Custl Korner
- Peter Williams
- Tony Standen
- Barry Davies
- Felix Martin
- John Bell
- Val Zika

=== Production ===
The show was filmed at ABC's Sydney studios with exteriors shot at Sydney's Kingsford Smith airport. Diana Perryman, who played an airhorstee, had been done.

=== Reception ===
The Sydney Morning Herald gave it a mixed review, but noted that "Max Meldrum made a superbly terrified fugitive" and "Owen Weingott was excellent as Sten, the disguised communist head of secret police".

=== US Screening ===
The play was bought for screening in the US by CBS in 1961 along with another Australian play, Outpost.

== See also ==
- List of live television plays broadcast on Australian Broadcasting Corporation (1950s)
- List of television plays broadcast on Australian Broadcasting Corporation (1960s)
