= Simulation table =

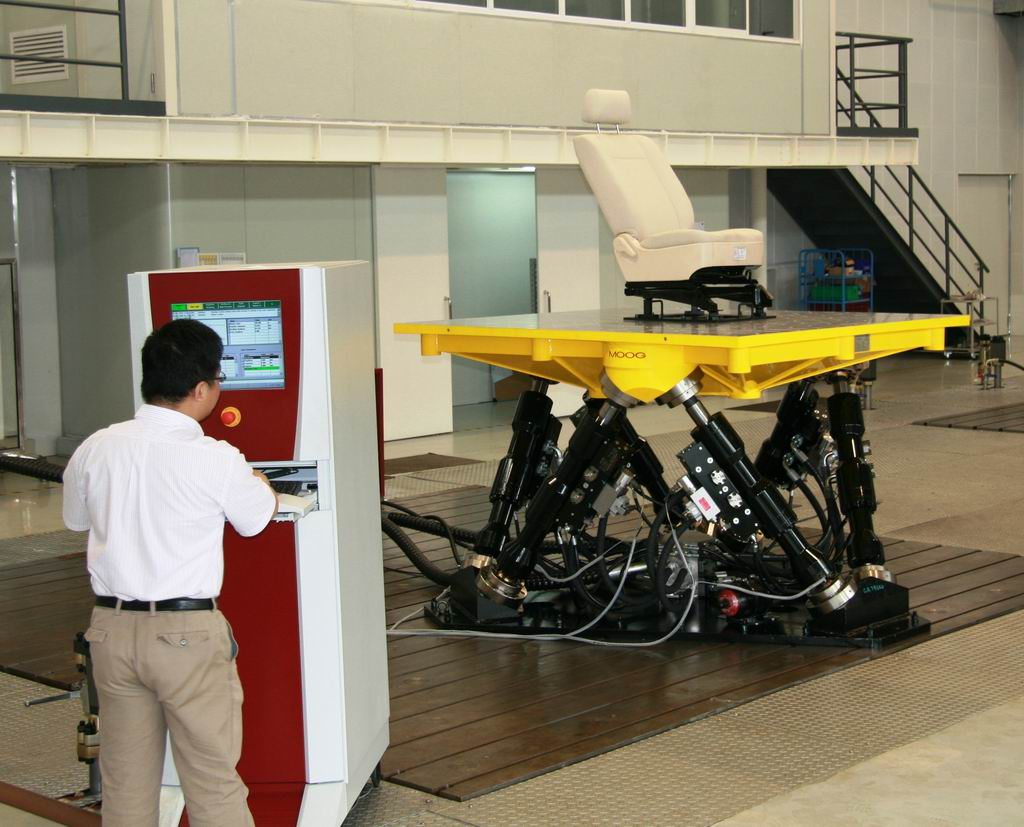
A modern multi-axis shaker table

A simulation table or multi-axis shaker table (MAST) is an automotive test system specifically designed for the high-frequency testing of vehicle components.

They can simulate acceleration and displacement outputs and reproduce key data collected on proving grounds by providing a full six degrees of freedom (6 DOF).

These test systems consist of a hexapod platform with a low resonance table on top. The test system can be used to simulate any kind of vibration in all six degrees of freedom.

The movements of the test system are tightly controlled by a digital test controller.

Simulation tables can be either electrical or hydraulical. Electric simulation table usually achieve a frequency range up to 25 Hz with a maximum payload of around 500 kilograms (1,100 lb).

For higher payloads or frequencies hydraulic simulation tables are used. Low frequency hydraulic simulation tables can easily reach 0.1 Hz to 120 Hz and test payloads up to 100 tons, while specialized high frequency simulation tables can reach in excess of 100 Hz, with more than 14 G of vertical acceleration to payloads beyond 680 kg (1,500 lb).
