= The Fourposter =

Play written by Jan de Hartog

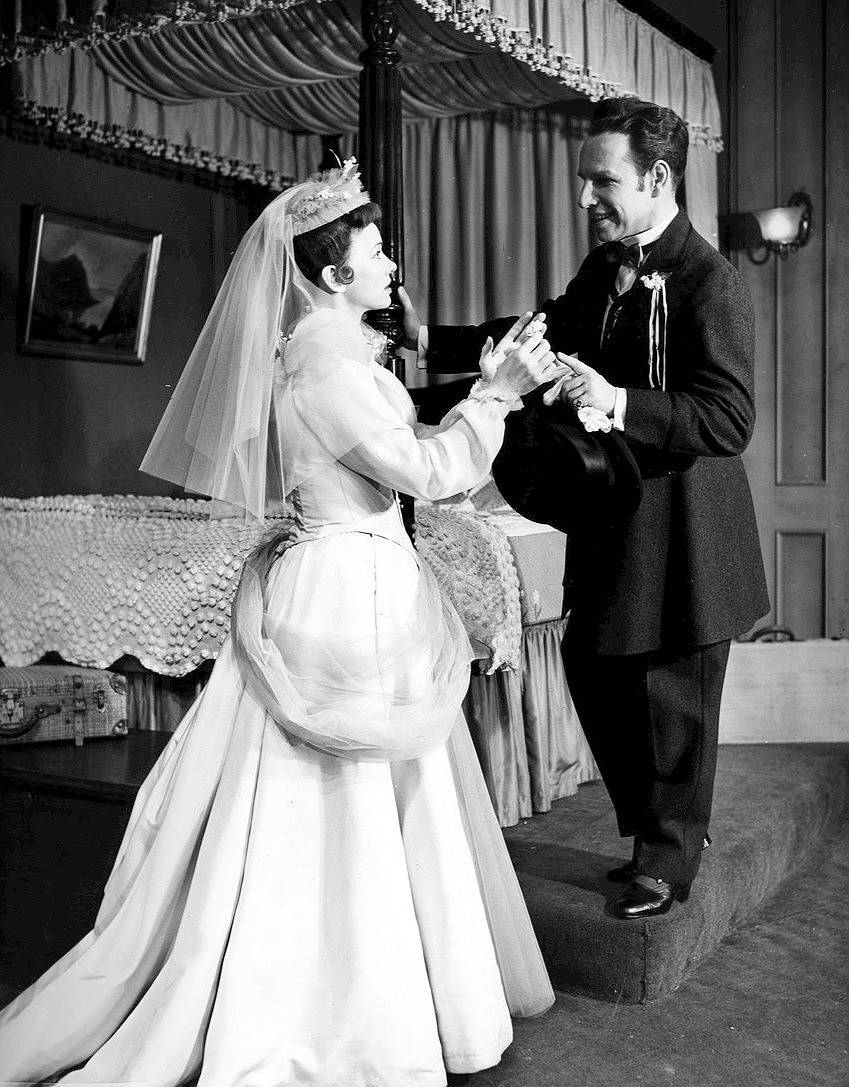
- Jessica Tandy and Hume Cronyn as Agnes and Michael, 1952
- Original language: English
- Written by: Jan de Hartog
- Characters: Michael and Agnes
- Subject: Marriage
- Genre: Drama
- Setting: Bedroom, 1890 to 1925

Premiere
- Date: 21 August 1950
- Place: New Theatre, Cambridge

The Fourposter is a play written by Jan de Hartog. The two-character story spans 35 years, from 1890 to 1925, as it focuses on the trials and tribulations, laughters and sorrows, and hopes and disappointments experienced by Agnes and Michael throughout their marriage. The set consists solely of their bedroom, dominated by the large, fourposter bed in the centre of the room. Among the couple's milestones are the consummation of their marriage, the birth of their first child, Michael's success as a writer, his extramarital affair, their daughter's wedding, and their preparations to move to smaller quarters and pass their home on to another newlywed couple.

After a pre-London tour, it opened in the West End in 1950. A Broadway production followed in 1951, and the play has been adapted for film, television and musical theatre.

== Productions ==
The world premiere was given at the New Theatre, Cambridge, on 21 August 1950, in a seven-week pre-London tour. The play, directed by Peter Ashmore, starred Dulcie Gray as Agnes and her real-life husband Michael Denison as Michael, and opened in the West End at the Ambassadors Theatre from 12 October to 9 December 1950. The run closed in anticipation of a transfer to New York, but negotiations fell through because the American producer insisted that if it were a success the stars must agree to stay in the piece for eighteen months, which their contractual filming obligations in Britain made impossible.

A Broadway production, directed by José Ferrer, opened on 24 October 1951, at the Ethel Barrymore Theatre, later moving to the John Golden to complete its 632-performance run. Original cast Hume Cronyn and Jessica Tandy later were replaced first by Burgess Meredith and Betty Field, and then Romney Brent and Sylvia Sidney. It received Tony Awards for Best Play and Best Director. The ending of the play was changed for American audiences. In the original version the final scene showed the two characters coming to terms with Agnes's terminal illness. For the US the author substituted a softer ending.

== Adaptations ==
=== Film ===
The partially animated 1952 film adaptation directed by Irving Reis, which altered the title to The Four Poster to avoid confusion, and changed the characters' names to John and Abby, starred Rex Harrison and Lilli Palmer, who won the Venice Film Festival's Volpi Cup for her performance. The film was nominated for both the Academy Award and Golden Globe Award for Best Black-and-White Cinematography. The film version alters the ending to have the couple die at the end, and then their ghosts re-enter the house as newlyweds, prepared to enjoy their life together all over again.

=== Television ===
Cronyn and Tandy recreated their roles for a July 1955 telecast live on the NBC anthology series Producers' Showcase.

The play was adapted for Australian TV by the ABC in 1964, directed by James Upshaw, and featuring Alasdair Duncan and Anne Haddy.

=== Musical theatre ===
In 1966, Tom Jones and Harvey Schmidt adapted the play for their musical production I Do! I Do!.

== Sources ==
- Denison, Michael (1985). Double Act. London: Michael Joseph. ISBN 978-0-7181-2290-4.
