= The Big Client =

- Written by: Malcolm Hulke; Eric Paice
- Directed by: James Upshaw
- Country of origin: Australia
- Original language: English

Production
- Running time: 75 mins
- Production company: ABC

Original release
- Network: ABC
- Release: 19 July 1961
- Release: 30 August 1961
- Release: 13 September 1961

The Big Client is a 1961 Australian television play. It was directed by James Upshaw. It screened "live" on the ABC on 19 July 1961 and was recorded in Sydney Australian TV drama was relatively rare at the time.

== Plot ==
In London, Henderson is an American millionaire launching a brand of tranquillisers. Fred Cooper, head of a London advertising firm JCB, tries to get Henderson to sign with them. Fred is ruthless, more so than three directors of JCB, Sam Bloomberg, Philip Comely and Peter Jones.

== Cast ==
- James Condon as Henderson
- Barry Linehan as Fred Cooper
- Alastair Duncan as Dave Mason
- Ric Hutton as Peter Jones
- Noel Brophy as Sam Bloomberg
- Deryck Barnes as Philip Comely
- Keith Buckley as Geoff Manning
- Coralie Neville as Greta Heffner
- Pamela Page as Jennifer King
- Diana Perryman as Eleanor Comely

== Production ==
The play by British writers Eric Paice and Malcolm Hulke had been filmed on British TV for the series Armchair Theatre in 1959, directed by Ted Kotcheff. Geoffrey Wedlock did the sets.

== Reception ==
The TV critic from the Sydney Morning Herald thought an advertising executive would have been hard put to clarify the curious dramatic direction—embracing shifts of meaning and emphasis" in the play, adding "it was a fault of the play_, not, generally speaking, of the actors or of James Upshaw's compact though not very imaginative production."
