= Chevrolet Sequel =

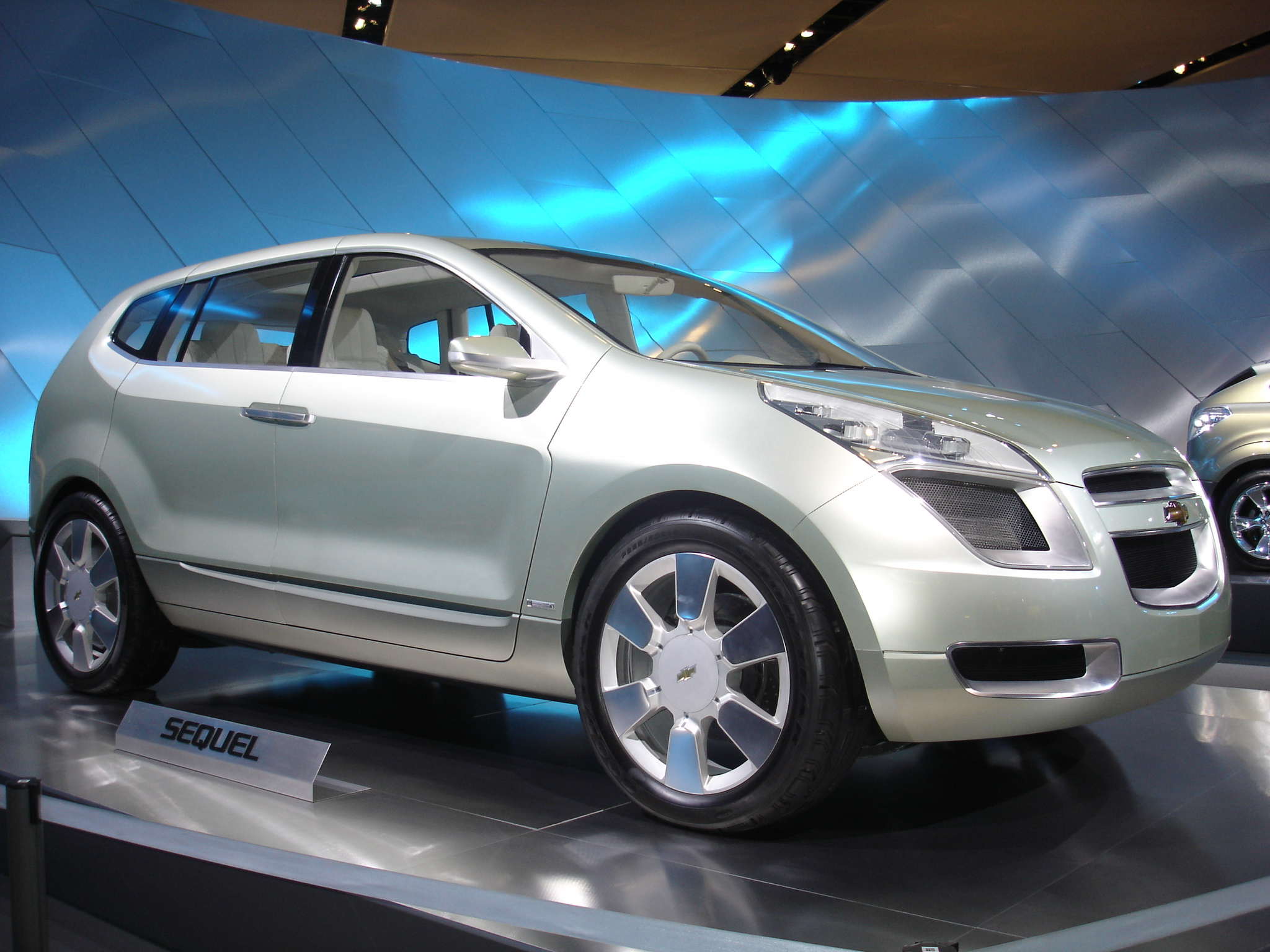

Overview
- Manufacturer: Chevrolet (General Motors)
- Production: 2005 (auto show concept); 2006 (running concept)

Body and chassis
- Class: Full-size hybrid crossover SUV
- Body style: 5-door SUV

Powertrain
- Engine: Hydrogen fuel cell

Dimensions
- Wheelbase: 3,040 mm (119.7 in)
- Length: 4,994 mm (196.6 in)
- Curb weight: 2,070 kg (4,564 lb)

The Chevrolet Sequel is a purpose-built hydrogen fuel cell-powered concept car and sport utility vehicle from Chevrolet, employing the then-latest generation of General Motors' fuel cell technology.

The Sequel's powertrain included an electronic control unit and a fourth-generation version of GM's fuel-cell stack. The Sequel became the basis for the design of the gas-powered Chevrolet Traverse, which was the replacement for the Uplander minivan.

== Characteristics ==
The Sequel's fuel-cell stack had a rated power output of 73 kW (98 hp), supplemented by a lithium-ion battery pack rated at 65 kW (87 hp). One 65 kW (87 hp) electric motor drove the front wheels, and individual 25 kW (34 hp) wheel-motors (outboard of the rear brakes) drove each rear wheel, providing total tractive power of 115 kW (154 hp).

The Sequel stored 8 kg (18 lb) of gaseous hydrogen in three cylindrical, carbon-composite fuel tanks, pressurized to 700 bar (10,000 psi) and mounted longitudinally beneath the cabin floor. As a result, the range of the vehicle was more than 480 km (300 mi).

The Sequel was just short of five metres long (4,994 mm, 196.1 in.), on a similarly long (3,040 mm, 119.7 in.) wheelbase in order to accommodate the extremely long fuel tanks.

== Possible production ==
GM made no commitment to building the Sequel. However, GM vice-chairman Bob Lutz has said he would push the company's strategy board to approve full production of a fuel-cell vehicle by 2011 model year. Due to the extremely high cost of fuel cells, GM opted to instead build several hydrogen-powered Chevrolet Equinox-based vehicles as testbeds. It then decided to change its direction of alternative-fueled vehicles, and unveiled the concept Volt in 2008, followed by the production version in 2010. As of October 2006, GM has built two Sequels.

== See also ==
- General Motors Hy-wire
- Zero-emissions vehicle
