= The Lorrae Desmond Show =

Australian TV series (1960–1964)

- Genre: Variety
- Presented by: Lorrae Desmond
- Starring: The Channel 2 singers; Jim Gussey and the ABC Dance Band; John Lasen and the Squires; Colin Croft; Michael Cole; Ted Hamilton
- Country of origin: Australia
- Original language: English
- No. of episodes: 45

Production
- Producer: James Upshaw
- Running time: 30 minutes

Original release
- Network: ABC Television
- Release: 1960 – 27 April 1964

The Lorrae Desmond Show was an early black and white, Australian television music and variety show, produced by James Upshaw which aired from 1960 to 1964 on ABC Television hosted by singer and entertainer Lorrae Desmond, later best known for her role as Shirley Gilroy in soap opera/serial A Country Practice, who won the Gold Logie for the program. The Lorrae Desmond Show was a similar to The Dinah Shore Show in the US, with emphasis on live performances and dance numbers. The final episode aired on 27 April 1964. Over 20 episodes of the series are held by the National Film and Sound Archive

Desmond at the time had been described as a talent in the vein of a young Cicely Courtneidge.

== Cast ==
Cast:

- The Channel 2 singers
- Jim Gussey and the ABC Dance Band
- John Lasen and the Squires
- Colin Croft
- Michael Cole
- Ted Hamilton
