= Smoky Joe's Cafe =

Book by Bryce Courtenay

- Author: Bryce Courtenay
- Language: English
- Genre: Novel
- Publisher: Penguin
- Publication date: 1 January 2001
- Publication place: Australia
- Media type: Print
- Pages: 273 pp.
- ISBN: 014029807X

Smoky Joe's Cafe, a 2001 novel by Bryce Courtenay, deals with the psychological and physical scars on Thommo left by the Vietnam War and Agent Orange. When it is discovered his daughter has leukaemia, his veteran mates band together as "The Dirty Dozen" behind a scheme to grow marijuana and convert it to "Hash Honey". With the assistance of Thommo's wife Wendy and a North Vietnamese veteran, the scheme is a success, and the money raised helps pay for a bone marrow transplant from a previously unknown part-aboriginal cousin found in the town of Daintree.

The book ends with Thommo's daughter writing after her father's death about his life, last days and the 2000 ANZAC Day.

== Reception ==
Andrea Henry of the Daily Mirror called the novel "another tale made for the big screen, a heart-melting, rippin' good yarn that'll make you want to break out the 4X as well as the Kleenex." Robin Carson of the Edmonton Journal wrote that Courtenay "paints the characters in this novella vividly, and does not lose the story in the details of the Vietmam War. The story is compelling, and has enough mystery to keep the reader involved throughout." Andrew Riemer of The Sydney Morning Herald called it "reassuringly traditional" and a "farrago of fantasy and populism", stating: "Its core is a tale or anecdote of great antiquity and seemingly inexhaustable appeal."
