= General Motors Hy-wire =

Hydrogen-powered concept car

GM Hy-wire

Overview
- Manufacturer: GM
- Production: 2002
- Designer: Adrian Chernoff

Body and chassis
- Class: Concept car
- Body style: 4-door station wagon
- Layout: Front-engine, front-wheel-drive layout
- Platform: AUTOnomy skateboard
- Related: Chevrolet Sequel

Powertrain
- Engine: Motor Single electric Power: 60 kW

Dimensions
- Wheelbase: 3,114 mm (122.6 inches)
- Length: 5 meters (195 inches)
- Curb weight: GVWR 4,185 lb (1,898 kg)

Chronology
- Predecessor: GM AUTOnomy

The Hy-wire (Hydrogen drive-by-wire) is a concept car from General Motors originally introduced in January 2002. The car runs on hydrogen fuel cells and uses a drive-by-wire system, meaning that the car is controlled electronically. GM asked school children to name the car, and one of them suggested "Hy-wire".

In 2003, General Motors stated that it was confident that it could produce a commercially viable model by 2010.

== Design ==
Due to hydrogen fuel cell drive system used by the Hy-wire, the conventional car layout has been revamped. Without the need for a conventional engine block and transmission system coupled to the steering column and pedals through mechanical linkage, the car's power system and single electric motor are built into a flat skateboard configuration. This serves to lower the car's center of gravity, but more importantly to standardize vehicle drive train systems. Because all propulsion and energy storage systems are housed in the skateboard, designers are free to arrange the passenger compartment however they see fit. This allows for highly flexible modular vehicle configurations such as a 4-door sedan, mini van, or even a small bus to be placed on the same drive system, with the only difference being the shape of the car's upper body and the location of seats. The skateboard itself contains crumple zones similar to those in conventional automobiles.

=== Driver interface ===
The car's drive-by-wire system coupled with cameras instead of mirrors and multiple LCD displays for feedback to the driver theoretically allows the driver's seat to be located anywhere; however, most current designs still favor the driver in front of or beside the other passengers for maximum visibility. The coupling of the controls to the drive system means neither the driver's seat nor the steering and throttle controls must be fixed in place. For example, the 2003 concept model has a single control interface that can be operated from either the right or left front seats, and the 2004 concept design places the two front seats on a rotating platform which allows the driver and passenger seats to be swapped or the driver to sit in front of the passenger for greater flexibility.

=== Powerplant ===
The Hy-wire is powered by a fuel cell capable of producing 94 kilowatts of power continuously and up to 129 kilowatts for short periods. The fuel cell itself is supplied with hydrogen from 3 tanks of compressed hydrogen located in the chassis. With its three-phase electric motor the 1,814 kg (4,000 lb) vehicle has a top speed of 160 km/h (100 mph).

== See also ==
- General Motors Sequel
- List of fuel cell vehicles
- Zero-emissions vehicle
- Video of Hy-wire in operation by Top Gear
