= The Red Moore Show =

- Genre: Variety
- Starring: Red Moore; Peggy Mortimer; Colin Croft
- Country of origin: Australia
- Original language: English

Production
- Producer: James Upshaw
- Running time: 30 minutes

Original release
- Network: ABC Television
- Release: 1962

The Red Moore Show is a 1962 Australian television series which aired on ABC Television. Starring Red Moore, it also featured Peggy Mortimer (wife of Enzo Toppano and mother of Peta Toppano) and Colin Croft. The series was a half-hour variety show, and aired for a single series.

== Reception ==
The Sydney Morning Herald gave the show a mixed review, saying that "I feel that someone has slipped badly" but also that "If both Moore and producer Upshaw can come up with a swift bit of pruning, the Red Moore Show could still come through with flying colours".

== See also ==
- The Toppanos
