= The Four Poster (1964 film) =

- Based on: play by Jan de Hartog
- Directed by: James Upshaw
- Starring: Alastair Duncan, Anne Haddy
- Country of origin: Australia
- Original language: English

Production
- Running time: 102 minutes
- Production company: ABC

Original release
- Release: 12 August 1964 (Sydney)
- Release: 26 August 1964 (Melbourne)

The Four Poster is a 1964 Australian television play based on the play The Fourposter by Jan de Hartog. It starred Anne Haddy and Alastair Duncan and was directed by James Upshaw.

== Cast ==
- Anne Haddy as Agnes
- Alastair Duncan as Michael

== Production ==
It was one of 20 television plays produced by the ABC in 1964.

It was filmed in Sydney and was the first televised play to feature only two characters

== Reception ==
The critic from the Sydney Morning Herald said "there is no point in pretending that" the play was "important or even honest" being essentially "a family radio serial... but as an exercise in the capacities of two performers to turn from newly married youngsters into nostalgic or ghostly elders, it retains at least a sporting interest."

The Age called it "a treat".
