= Off the Peg =

- Genre: Variety
- Starring: Colin Croft
- Country of origin: Australia
- Original language: English
- No. of episodes: 7

Production
- Running time: 30 minutes

Original release
- Network: ABC Television
- Release: 9 July – 20 August 1965

Off the Peg is an Australian television series that aired in 1965. Starring Colin Croft, it was a variety series on ABC. It was announced as having "little, if any, talking" and as being "all songs, music and dancing". It aired during July and August. In Sydney the episode telecast 16 July 1965 aired at 9:30PM, and aired against Double Your Dollars on TCN-9, a film on ATN-7 and a film on TEN-10. It was announced that eight episodes would air, but according to TV guides, only seven were actually scheduled.

The National Film and Sound Archive holds six audio recordings of performances from the series.

== Episodes ==
No.	Title	Original release date
1	Episode 1	9 July 1965
2	Episode 2	16 July 1965
3	Episode 3	23 July 1965
4	Episode 4	30 July 1965
5	Episode 5	6 August 1965
6	Episode 6	13 August 1965
Guests: Wendy Blacklock, Bunny Gibson, Stuart Finch
7	Episode 7	20 August 1965
Guests: Norma Shirlee, Gita Rivera, Johnny Rohan
