= General Motors XP-883 =

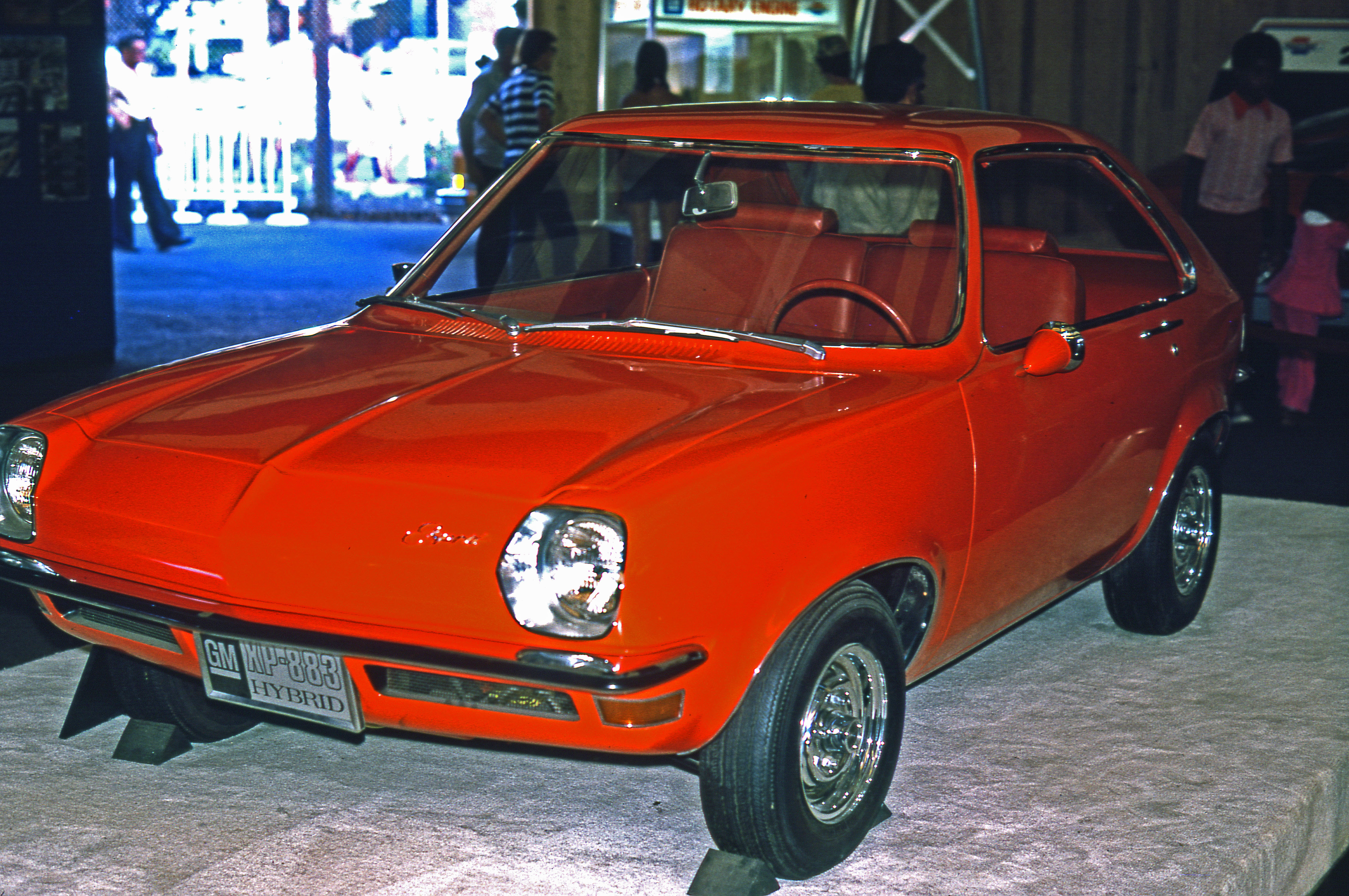
General Motors XP-883 plug-in hybrid concept car built 1969, on display at the 1974 World's Fair in Spokane, Washington.

In the late 1960s, General Motors Company directed its GM R&D and Pontiac divisions to develop concept mini-cars for urban drivers. GM developed the XP-883 an experimental plug-in hybrid car demonstrated by General Motors in 1969. Primarily intended as a commuter vehicle, the very small car had a fiberglass body with a design resembling the future Chevrolet Chevette. The two-door hatchback had seating for two adults and two children, though the children sat in rear-facing seats and would enter and exit through the tailgate. It was powered by the combination of a two-cylinder engine and a DC electric motor plus batteries. Electricity was stored in six 12-volt batteries placed between the rear wheels. The related Pontiac concept was the Pontiac X-4 with a radical two stroke aircraft type radial engine.

At 35 cubic inches (570 cm^{3}), the engine was small enough to bypass laws of the day mandating emissions control devices. The batteries could be charged using a standard 115-volt wall outlet and could power the vehicle in all-electric mode during city driving. In hybrid mode, it had a maximum speed of 60 miles per hour (97 km/h), which could be reached in 28 seconds. A speed of 40 miles per hour (64 km/h) could be attained in twelve seconds. The electric motor powered the car until it reached 10 miles per hour (16 km/h), at which point the gasoline engine would kick in when running in hybrid mode. At cruising speeds, the gasoline engine would normally provide all of the power.

While the XP-883 was built using off-the-shelf technology, General Motors did not provide an electric car to consumers until about 25 years later, when the GM EV1 was made available for lease (at the same time the factory Chevrolet S-10 EV was manufactured for sale as opposed to strictly for lease). GM's full hybrid system appeared first in their city buses and their first "mild" hybrid light vehicles, called BAS Hybrid, appeared in 2006 as a MY2007 Saturn Vue Green Line. A non-bus light vehicle version of GM's "Two-Mode" full hybrid system entered the market in 2008 in various MY2009 vehicles, for details see Global Hybrid Cooperation. In late 2010, GM introduced the original generation of the Chevrolet Volt, calling such a vehicle technology related to the pioneer XP-883 an EREV (Extended Range Electric Vehicle).
