= Digital test controller =

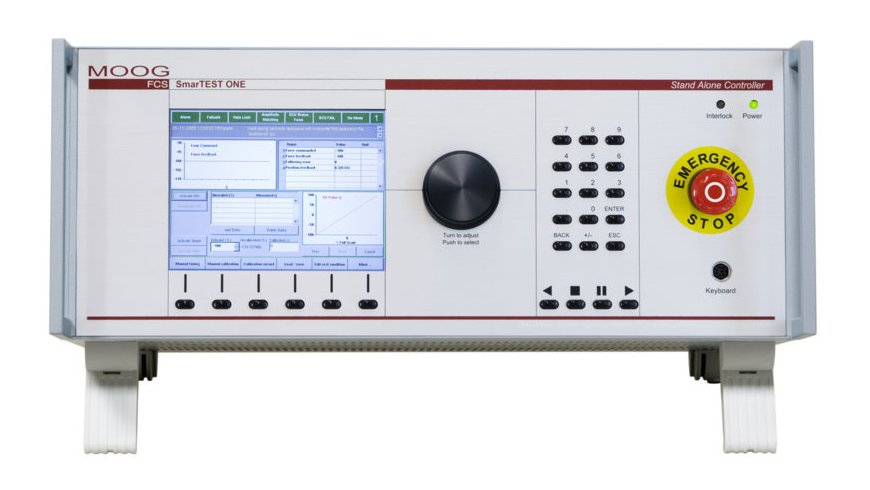
A modern digital test controller

Digital test controllers are devices (usually computer based) that provide motion control by processing digital signals. Typically a controller has inputs connected to sensors on the device they control, which measure the feedback, its current state (for example the current position), and process this signal to provide an output to a hydraulical, electrical or other type of servomechanism control of the controlled device, with the aim of matching a control signal.

A good example is an elevator. The control signal is the button selects the floor the passenger wants to go. The controller of the elevator looks at which floor the elevator currently is (current position), at the floor selected (by the button) and by comparing them to each other derives a signal to control a servo (either hydraulic or electric) that makes the elevator move until the right floor is reached.

In the older days test controllers were usually analog, but with the rapid developments in digital signal processing and computer technology, test controllers are almost exclusively digital devices. This offers many advantages, because it allows the user to execute all kinds of additional operations on the digital signals, in addition to the standard PID controller. Digital test controllers offered by Moog, provide novel advantages for this type of system control.
