= The Slaughter of St. Teresa's Day (film) =

1960 film by Alan Burke

- Ad from SMH 21 March 1960
- Based on: play The Slaughter of St Teresa's Day by Peter Kenna
- Written by: Peter Kenna
- Directed by: Alan Burke
- Starring: Neva Carr Glyn
- Country of origin: Australia
- Original language: English

Production
- Running time: 75 mins
- Production company: ABC

Original release
- Network: ABC
- Release: 23 March 1960 (Sydney, live)
- Release: 29 June 1960 (Melbourne, taped)

The Slaughter of St. Teresa's Day was a 1960 Australian TV play based on the 1959 stage play of the same name by Peter Kenna.

It was filmed by the ABC and directed by Alan Burke on 23 March 1960 at a time when local drama production was rare. The spelling of the title was "Theresa's Day" not "Teresa's Day" like the play.

Neva Carr Glyn reprised the role that Kenna had written for her. Extra scenes and characters were added from the play.

== Plot ==
Oola Maguire is throwing a St. Theresa's Day Party for her clients and friends, along with her right "hand" Essie Farrell. She has a party every year on that day to celebrate surviving the time she was shot by a gunman. Her rules for the party are no guns and no alcohol. Oola also does not invite any women.

Before the guests arrive she is introduced to Horrie, a friend of her associate Charlie Gibson; Horrie has just got out of prison after serving a five-year sentence. Other guests include Whitey Maguire, who has just got out of prison after two years, and his girlfriend Wilma Cartwright, a former prostitute; Oola wants to reconcile Whitey with his father Paddy.

Oola's 16-year-old convent educated daughter Thelma visits the party accompanied by two nuns, Sister Mary Luke and Sister Mary Mark. Thelma is considering becoming a nun.

The guests arrive and are unhappy about giving up their guns but do it for Oola's sake. The men propose a "treasure hunt" which will enable them to drink.

Whitey and Paddy confront each other - Paddy was unhappy about Whitey dating Wilma. Whitey defends Wilma, saying she waited for him for two years. It turns out Wilma and Whitey were secretly married shortly before the party.

Oola finds Thelma in the arms of conman Horrie. A confrontation follows, leading to gunfire - as some people still had guns with them.

Thelma returns to the convent. It is ambiguous as to what her future relationship with her mother will be.

== Cast ==
- Neva Carr Glyn as Oola Maguire
- Annette Andre as Thelma Maguire
- Walter Sullivan as Horrie Darcel
- Alma Butterfield as Essie Farrell
- Frank Waters as Uncle Paddy Maguire
- Wendy Playfair as Wilma Cartwright
- Rodney Milgate as Whitey Maguire
- Gordon Glenwright as Charlie Gibson
- Mary Mackay as Sister Mary Luke
- Moya O'Sullivan as Sister Mary Mark
- Nat Levison as Barney Doyle
- Kenneth Goodlet
- Les Berryman
- Ron Dunphy
- John Fegan
- Christopher Douglas

== Production ==
For the late 1950s most locally made plays on Australian television were imported scripts. Slaughter of St Teresa's Day was an attempt to make local content. According to Filmink the original play "was naturalistic, road-tested, critically approved, offered showy roles and all took place in one location. As such it was ideal for television adaptation."

Director Alan Burke had worked at the Elizabethan Theatre Trust, who presented the original production of the play. Many of the cast from the stage show reprised their performance for TV.

It was designed by Philip Hickie, who also designed the original stage production. Annette Andre said "that was a good play. It gave me an opportunity to play a significant role in a modern drama with a good cast and a very good script, and addressing a real life situation. I guess it was the beginning of the “kitchen sink” dramas." Walter Sullivan took over the role played by Grant Taylor on stage.

Les Weldon did the technical supervision.

== Reception ==
The Australian Woman's Weekly called it " one of the best bits of live TV I have seen... Alma Butterfield as Aunt Essie stole the acting honors. She was splendid, such a real character — everyone's elderly aunt, the one that lives with the family and smoothes things out for them. Neva Carr-Glyn as Oola was good, but not in Aunt Essie's class. There should be more TV like this. It was excellent entertainment."

Max Harris of The Bulletin wrote this was when "Australian television drama came of age ."

The critic for the Sydney Morning Herald thought the play "lost little of its waywardness and some of its liveliness in a television production" and had faults with the play ("Kenna seems unable to settle decisively on one theme and to develop it boldly enough to carry his admirable intentions and considerable ability") but felt it was a "very worthwhile production, organised with some tact and imagination by Alan Burke."

The critic for the Sunday Sydney Morning Herald said "there are few TV dramas I have enjoyed more... It could have been written with television specifically in mind."

The critic for The Age (newspaper) called it "a gem of a TV script... a triumph for the ladies... a landmark in Australian TV drama."

In December 1960, reviewing the year in television, the Age thought it was "one of the most entertaining and best produced of its ilk."

In 1967, Agnes Harrison reviewed the first decade of Australian television and wrote Day was "Australian drama at its very best".

Reviewing the play years later Filmink stated the play was "creaky. It very much comes across like televised theatre; Alan Burke was skilled at blocking and handling his cast, but had some way to go before mastering the art of the close up. The actors sometimes play to the gallery." However the critic then added:

It completely captures a time and a place in Australia’s history. Oola Maguire’s blustering, laughing, sentimental bookie, cackling away with Essie, brilliantly brings to life a segment of society in my grandparents’ generation, with their garish side tables, pictures of saints, transistor radios and men with moustaches; it’s the time of SP bookies, and sing-a-longs around the piano, of prostitutes, sly grog, and schools run by nuns. It’s there in hundreds of little details: the way Walter Sullivan’s Horrie cleans his fingernails with a dagger, or how Essie answers the phone, or Oola’s reading glasses, or Wilma’s anxious dancing, or how the men hold their cigarettes and drink beer and swagger and say “right oh”. It’s an Australia that has vanished now, but which Kenna and company bring to life for 75 minutes... It’s not a masterpiece but it is important, and should be better known.

== See also ==
- List of television plays broadcast on Australian Broadcasting Corporation (1960s)
