= John Tate (actor) =

Australian actor (1915–1979)

- Born: John Paul Tate; January 1915; Sydney, Australia
- Died: 19 March 1979 (aged 64); Freshwater Bay, Isle of Wight, England
- Spouse: Neva Carr Glynn (m. 1940; div. 1954)
- Children: Nick Tate

John Paul Tate (January 1915 – 19 March 1979) was an Australian actor.

== Early life ==
Tate was born in Sydney, Australia in 1915. He was of Russian descent.

== Career ==
After starting professionally with a part in a radio serial, Tate then gained small roles in several movies. He played Charles Ulm in the 1946 adventure film Smithy and had a recurring role as Jack Mason in the 1950s Australian soap Dynasty. He was best known for appearing in the 1959 American post-apocalyptic science fiction drama film On the Beach.

After his success in On the Beach, Tate decided to move to England in the 1960s. where he appeared in various television series including The Saint, Danger Man, Man of the World, The Champions and Department S. He played Magwitch in the 1967 television adaptation of Great Expectations He also voiced many guest stars in Thunderbirds.

He played Captain SS Midland in the 1963 science fiction film, The Day of the Triffids and Julian Singleton in the 1963 musical comedy film It's All Happening. He had further guest roles in television series such as The Baron, Strange Report, The Troubleshooters and The Power Game.

== Personal life ==
Tate was married to Margaret Anne Barton. His second marriage was to actress and stage manager Neva Carr Glyn on 19 July 1940 at St Mark's Anglican Church, Darling Point, Sydney. They first met at ABC Studios, playing opposite each other in the radio play Castles of England and fell in love quickly. They appeared in numerous shows together, and began to be teamed in romantic leads, including in Melody Romances and Aphrodite. Together with Glyn, Tate had a son, the actor Nick Tate, who was born in Sydney in 1952. Tate and Glyn were divorced in 1954.

Tate eventually moved to England, where he lived for the rest of his life. He died on 19 March 1979 at the age of 64, at his home in Freshwater Bay, Isle of Wight in the UK.

== Filmography ==
=== Film ===
Year	Title	Role	Notes
1943	Fourth Liberty Loan: I Had a Son		Short film
1944	First Victory Loan: Return Journey		Short documentary film
1946	Smithy	Charles Ulm	Feature film
1958	Smiley Gets a Gun	Dave Rudge (uncredited)	Feature film
1958	His Excellency		TV film
1959	Thunder of Silence		TV play
1959	On the Beach	Admiral Bridie	Feature film
1961	The Devil's Hands	Inspector Yeagar	Short film
1962	Under Western Eyes	Landlord	TV film
1962	The Slaughter of St Teresa's Day	Charlie	TV play
1962	The Pot Carriers	Prison Officer I / C Visiting Room	Feature film
1962	We Joined the Navy	Inspector at Royal Navy College	Feature film
1963	The Day of the Triffids	Captain – SS Midland	Feature film
1963	It's All Happening	Julian Singleton	Feature film
1966	Bindle (One of Them Days)	Mr Stokes	Feature film
1966	Invasion	Dundy	Feature film
1970	Julius Caesar	Clitus	Feature film
1976	The Autobiography of a Flea	Aged Priest	Feature film (final film role)

=== Television ===
Year	Title	Role	Notes
1956	The Sheriff of Cochise	Man	TV series, 1 episode
1958	Whirlybirds	State Policeman	TV series, 1 episode
1959	Shell Presents		Anthology TV series, 1 episode
1960	U.S. Marshal	Schuster	TV series, 1 episode
1961	Whiplash	Wenders	TV series, 1 episode
1961–1966	ITV Play of the Week	Head Warder / Softy / Sergeant Major Broome / Pop Lewis / Nick Storey / Bludgeon / Professor Leighton	Anthology TV series, 7 episodes
1962	Drama 61-67	Grandpa / Byker / Bryce Hewitt	Anthology TV series, 3 episodes
1962	Emergency Ward 10	Philip Ross	TV series, 5 episodes
1962	Maigret	Jericho	TV series, 1 episode
1962; 1967	Armchair Theatre	Mr Halliday / Bly	Anthology TV series, 2 episodes
1962–1970	Z-Cars	Colonel Bullen / Kimble / Mr Gregory / Captain Anderson	TV series, 6 episodes
1963	BBC Sunday-Night Play	Taxi Driver	Anthology TV series, 1 episode
1963	Man of the World	Washington Official	TV series, 1 episode
1963	Moonstrike	Sissons	TV series, 1 episode
1963	Bud		TV series, 1 episode
1963	Taxi!	Mr Barker	TV series, 1 episode
1963; 1964	The Avengers	Colonel Wesley / Willie	TV series, 2 episodes
1964	First Night	Larkin	Anthology TV series, 1 episode
1964	Dixon of Dock Green	Paddy O'Brien	TV series, 1 episode
1964	The Villains	Carsley	TV series, 1 episode
1964	Gideon's Way	Bert Macey	TV series, 1 episode
1964	The Brothers Karamazov	Father Ferapont	Miniseries, 2 episodes
1964; 1965	ITV Sunday Night Drama	Major Tucker-Smith / Joe	Anthology TV series, 2 episodes
1964–1967	The Saint	Skinner / Dave Snyders / Assayer	TV series
1965	R3	Dr Stroud	TV series, 1 episode
1965	For Whom the Bell Tolls	Agustin	TV series, 4 episodes
1965–1966	The Troubleshooters	Milt Addis / Uncle Jed / Tosh Brinkwater	TV series, 3 episodes
1965–1966	Thunderbirds	McColl / Security Guard / Frank Hopper / Sir Harry / Maxie / Scheiler / Foreign Colonel / Blackmer / Captain, Ocean Pioneer II / Stevens / Commander, Ocean Pioneer I / Scottish Onlooker / Solarnaut Camp	TV series, 7 episodes
1966	The Liars	Horton	TV series, 1 episode
1966	Danger Man	Fisherman	TV series, 1 episode
1966	Redcap	Burton	TV series, 1 episode
1966	The Baron	Josef Holz	TV series, 1 episode
1966	This Man Craig	Mr Ogilvy	TV series, 1 episode
1966	King of the River	Butters	TV series, 1 episode
1966	BBC Play of the Month	Lord Lufkin	Anthology TV series, 1 episode
1966	The Power Game	Billy Straker	TV series, 2 episodes
1967	Softly, Softly	Des Dwyer	TV series, 1 episode
1967	Great Expectations	Magwitch	TV series, 4 episodes
1967	Trapped	Tommy Bowman	TV series, 1 episode
1967	Wuthering Heights	Mr Earnshaw	Miniseries, 1 episode
1968	The First Lady	Joe Woodward	TV series, 1 episode
1968	The Champions	Schmeltz	TV series, 1 episode
1968	Sherlock Holmes	Peter Carey / John Turner	TV series, 2 episodes
1969	The Expert	James Redmond	TV series, 1 episode
1969	Fraud Squad	Oakington	TV series, 1 episode
1969	Christ Recrucified	Captain Fortounas	Miniseries, 2 episodes
1969	Department S	Henri Rachou	TV series, 1 episode
1969	Strange Report	Wiglow	TV series, 1 episode
1970	Dynasty	Jack Mason	TV series, 10 episodes

== Stage ==
Year	Title	Role	Notes
1944	Claudia	Jerry Seymour	His Majesty's Theatre, Auckland with J. C. Williamson (alongside wife Neva Carr Glyn)
1944	Arsenic and Old Lace	Teddy Brewster	His Majesty's Theatre, Auckland with J. C. Williamson
1944	Susan and God	Michael O'Hara	His Majesty's Theatre, Auckland with J. C. Williamson (alongside wife Neva Carr Glyn)
1944	The Man Who Came to Dinner	Beverley Carlton	His Majesty's Theatre, Auckland (alongside wife Neva Carr Glyn)
1944	Kiss and Tell	Private Earhart	His Majesty's Theatre, Dunedin with J. C. Williamson (alongside wife Neva Carr Glyn)
1946	Dangerous Corner		Minerva Theatre, Sydney with Whitehall Productions (alongside wife Neva Carr Glyn)
1947	Clutterbuck	Clutterbuck	Minerva Theatre, Sydney with Whitehall Productions (alongside wife Neva Carr Glyn)
1947	Grand National Night		Minerva Theatre, Sydney with Whitehall Productions (alongside wife Neva Carr Glyn)
1948	Light and Shade: The Lost Generation		Minerva Theatre, Sydney with Whitehall Productions
1948	Off the Record		Minerva Theatre, Sydney with Whitehall Productions

== Radio ==
Year	Title	Role	Note
1937	As Ye Sow		2FC / ABC Radio serial (alongside wife Neva Carr Glyn)
1938	Castles of England		ABC Radio serial, episode: "Pevensey Castle" (alongside wife Neva Carr Glyn)
1938	A Bachelor Reverie	Richard Matheson	(alongside wife Neva Carr Glyn)
	Melody Romances		(alongside wife Neva Carr Glyn)
	Aphrodite		(alongside wife Neva Carr Glyn)
1940	Grey Face	Scotland Yard Chief Inspector Read	ABC Radio serial
1940s	Charlie Chuckle		Grace Gibson radio serial
1940s	Lady of the Heather		2CH radio serial
1941	The Fire on the Snow	Edward Adrian Wilson	ABC Radio play
1942	Milky Way		Lux Radio Theatre radio play
1943	Crackerjack		2UE variety show (alongside wife Neva Carr Glyn)
1946–	Victoria Regina (aka Victoria, Queen of England)	Prince Albert	2UW radio serial (alongside wife Neva Carr Glyn)
1947	The Suicide Club	Colonel Gerald, Master-of-the-Horse	2CH Playhouse of Favourites radio play
1947	Limelight and Shadow		2UW radio serial
1947	Hester's Diary	John Carmichael	2UE / 2CH radio serial
1947–1948	Big Sister	John	3AW, 2GB, 2UW radio serial (alongside wife Neva Carr Glyn)
1949	Through the Looking Glass		Lux Radio Theatre show (alongside wife Neva Carr Glyn
1949	The Bette Dickson Show		Radio variety show
1950	The Meeting of the Waters		ABC Radio play
1951	Vengeance is Mine	Tennyson Grey	2UW radio serial
1950s	Brand of Justice		2UW radio serial
1950s	Strange Stories of the Sea		3DB radio serial
1951	Thistledown	Teodor Fristedt	ABC Radio play
1951	Tapestries of Life		Grace Gibson 2GB radio serial
1952	The General Motors Hour		2GB radio show
1952	The Second Threshold	Josiah Bolton	General Motors Hour play
1952	Inner Sanctum		2GB radio serial, episode 13: "The Grey Wolf" (alongside wife Neva Carr Glyn)
1954	The Mary Jane	Stever	ABC Radio serial
1954	Ned Kelly	Tarleton	ABC Radio play
1954	Stairway to Fame		Radio serial (alongside wife Neva Carr Glyn)
1954–	Theatrette		3KZ radio serial
1955	The Long Memory		General Motors Hour play (episode 199)
1955	The Clock	Doctor	3XY radio serial, episode 8: "Aunt Emmy"
1955	Little Boy Lost		Lux Radio Theatre serial
1956	Double Door		General Motors Hour play (episode 207) (alongside wife Neva Carr Glyn)
1957	The Sea Hound		2GB radio serial
Late 1950s	Life Can Be Beautiful		Grace Gibson 2UE radio series
1950s-early 1960s	A Shot in the Dark		Radio serial
1952–early 1960s	A Rocky Starr Adventure		3DB, 2CH, 4BK radio serial
1960	The Hidden Truth	Mink	Radio serial
	How Green Was My Valley		
