= Wendy Playfair =

Australian actress (1926–2026)

- Playfair as Minnie Donovan in TV series Prisoner
- Born: 28 August 1926; Woollahra, New South Wales, Australia
- Died: 11 March 2026 (aged 99); Sydney, Australia
- Other name: Wendy Williams
- Occupation: Actress
- Years active: Radio (c. 1940s), theatre 1945–1960, television and film 1960–2013
- Known for: Prisoner as Minnie Donovan
- Family: John Thomas Playfair; Thomas Alfred John Playfair (uncle); Judy Playfair (cousin); Kip Williams (grandson)
- Awards: Macquarie Radio Award

Wendy Playfair Williams (28 August 1926 – 11 March 2026) was an Australian theatre, radio, television and film character actress, best known for her roles in television serials.

Playfair started her career in the post-WWII years in theatre plays and radio serials, but became best known for her stint in television series Prisoner in 1983–1984 as inmate Minerva "Minnie" Donovan. Playfair's other important roles were in the television series Home and Away and the 2009 film Accidents Happen starring Geena Davis.

== Early life ==
Wendy Playfair was born in Woollahra, Sydney, on 28 August 1926, to Edmund Strathmore Creer (Strath) Playfair (1894–1965) and Kathleen Ryrie (Babs) née Campbell (1899–1989). She was the third of four sisters. Direct descendants of famous English-born Sydney butcher, politician and philanthropist John Thomas Playfair, the family were well-to-do, socially prominent and in the meat trade.

== Career ==
Playfair whilst still at school joined Bryant's Playhouse, a Little Theatre group. She went on to study with other Little Theatres after she finished school, attending drama classes at night, while working an office job during the day. As radio work picked up, she gave up her office job to focus on her acting career.

Playfair started her career in theatre and radio from the mid-1940s, where she worked for the ABC and consistently in morning serials for Grace Gibson, as well as in many radio plays. Playfair received the radio Macquarie Award. Prior to television she had also appeared in a few stage roles, but was best known as a radio performer.

She was a staple on the small screen in character roles from 1960, when she appeared in the television adaptation of a production of the play The Slaughter of St Theresa's Day.

Playfair primarily appeared in cameo roles, with guesting roles in series starting from the late 1960s until 2013, such as Homicide, Hunter, The Young Doctors, Return to Eden, Spirited, Rake and Packed to the Rafters.

However, she had several parts as different characters in serials A Country Practice (three roles), Home and Away (two roles) and All Saints (two roles).

She also had parts in telemovies and films, including Ride a Wild Pony (aka Harness Racing), the only Walt Disney film ever produced in Australia and a pivotal role in the film Accidents Happen, opposite Geena Davis in 2009.

In 2022, Playfair gave a rare interview with the podcast series Talking Prisoner.

== Personal life and death ==
Playfair married James Williams at All Saints Anglican Church in Woollahra, Sydney, on 6 July 1951. On 5 July 1953, the couple had a daughter.

She was the cousin of Olympic silver medallist Judy Playfair, aunt of Skye Leckie, niece of politician Thomas Alfred John Playfair and grandmother of Kip Williams. Her youngest sister married barrister Sir John Atwill, who was president of the Liberal Party of Australia.

Playfair died in Sydney on 11 March 2026, aged 99.

== Awards ==
Year	Work	Award	Category	Result	Ref.
1951	If This Be Error	Macquarie Awards	Best Female Supporting Role	Won	

== Filmography ==
=== Film ===
Year	Title	Role	Type	Ref.
1971	Three to Go	Mother (Segment: "Judy")	Feature film	
1993	Terra Nullius		Short film	
2009	Accidents Happen	Mrs. Smolensky	Feature film Australia/UK	
2010	The Tree	Aunt Harriet	Feature film	

=== Television ===
Year	Title	Role	Type	Ref.
1960	The Slaughter of St. Teresa's Day	Wilma Cartwright	TV play	
1962	The Funnel Web	Irene Charlton	TV movie	
1965	The Affair		TV play	
1967	Divorce Court		1 episode	
1967; 1968	Homicide	Ann Radford / Jennifer Chandler	2 episodes	
1968	Hunter	Mrs. West	1 episode	
1973	Matlock Police	Ethel Parker	1 episode	
1974	The Evil Touch		1 episode	
1974	Things That Go Bump in the Night	Audrey	1 episode	
1975	Ride a Wild Pony (aka Harness Racing)	Mrs. Quayle	TV movie	
1977	Say You Want Me		TV movie	
1978	Bit Part	Emma	TV movie	
1978	Shimmering Light	Gwen Stuart	TV movie	
1978	Father Dear Father in Australia	Mrs. Town	1 episode	
1979	Glenview High		1 episode	
1980	The Young Doctors	Mrs. Steele	1 episode	
1981	Bellamy	Milly	1 episode	
1982–1992	A Country Practice	Lillian Palmer / Gwen Bowman / Val Jackson	5 episodes	
1983	Carson's Law	Nola Douglas	1 episode	
1983–1984	Prisoner	Minnie Donovan	33 episodes	
1984	Mother and Son		1 episode	
1984	Special Squad		1 episode	
1985	Fortress	Old Woman	TV movie	
1986	Return To Eden	Rena McMaster	8 episodes	
1987	Willing and Abel		1 episode	
1988	Swap Shop		1 episode	
1990	Rafferty's Rules		1 episode	
1994	Cody: Bad Love	Mrs. Unwin	TV movie	
1997	Big Sky	Mrs. Toohey	Season 1, 1 episode	
2000; 2003	All Saints	Gloria Mayberry / Hannah 'Bubba' Rosen	2 episodes	
2002	Don't Blame The Koalas	Mrs. Smythe (voice)	1 episode	
2005–2009	Home and Away	Audrey Long / Mrs. Grey	3 episodes	
2010	Spirited	Geisela Mackenzie	Season 2, 1 episode	
2010	Rake	Elspeth	1 episode	
2011	Laid	Old Lady	1 episode	
2013	Packed to the Rafters	Moira Beckett	Season 6, 1 episode	
2022	Talking Prisoner	Guest	Podcast, 1 episode	
	House of Horace	Mrs Wilson-Smith		

== Theatre ==
Year	Title	Role	Type	Ref.
1945	The Springtime of Others		Bryant's Playhouse	
1946	Sheppey		Mosman Town Hall with Mosman Theatre Guild	
1947	To Kill a Cat		Mosman Town Hall with Mosman Theatre Guild	
1947	The Admirable Crichton	Tweeny	Mosman Theatre Guild	
1947	Over the Fence is Out	Betty	Mosman Theatre Guild	
1949	The Blue Bird		Theatre Royal Sydney with J. C. Williamson's	
1949	Pirates at the Barn	Kathy	Darlington Deaf and Dumb Institute, Sydney & Minerva Theatre, Sydney with Mosman Children's Theatre	
1950	Before the Party		St James' Hall, Sydney with John Alden Company	
1950	The Old Bachelor	Lead role	Mosman Town Hall	
1950	The Anonymous Lover		Parramatta City Hall	
1951	Madame Louise	Penny	Palace Theatre, Sydney with Sir Benjamin Fuller	
1951	Love's a Luxury	Serving maid	Palace Theatre, Sydney with Sir Benjamin Fuller	
1951	A Message from Margaret		Palace Theatre, Sydney	
1986	Room to Move		Stables Theatre, Sydney with Griffin Theatre Company	

== Radio ==
Year	Title	Role	Type	Ref.
1949	The Apple Tree		Caltex Theatre on 2GB	
1949	Sense and Sensibility	Elinor	2FC, BAR, 4QG	
1950	Lady in Distress			
1950	The Story of Mary Lane	Peggy Douglas	2KA	
1950	The Middle Watch	Lead role	2GB	
1950	The Fire Within		2GB	
1950	Before the Party		St James's Hall with John Alden Company	
1950s	Ellen Dodd		2UW	
1951	Long Shots Don't Win		2UW	
1951	If This Be Error	Nina Moore		
1951	Hart of the Territory		2GB	
1952	The Divorce of Lady X	Leslie	5DN	
1952	Doña Clarines	Marcela	2FC	
1952	Night of Suspense	Diana	Caltex Theatre on 5DN	
1953	Snow Bound		The General Motors Hour, episode 86 on 5DN	
1953	For Love or Money		2GB	
1953	The English Family	Elizabeth	2GB	
1953	The Diplomat	Gillian Rogers	2UE	
1953	The Diamond Studded Horse	Shirley Malcolmson-Stuart	2UE	
1954	The Adventures of Ellery Queen	Nikki Porter		
1954	Society Steps Out	Compere	2SM	
1954	Code of the Hills		2UE	
1954	The Bride of Fate	Blanche	4BK	
1955	The Clock	Jeannie Claire	Episode 4: "The Actor"	
1955	The Clock	Hazel	Episode 10: "The Helping Hand"	
1956	The Clock	Lola	Episode 15: "The Hitchhiker"	
1956	The Clock	Doris	Episode 19: "Amazon Island"	
1956	The Clock	Juliet	Episode 23: "Star-Crossed Lovers"	
1956	The Clock	Lucy	Episode 32: "Behind the Mask"	
1956	The Clock	Francine	Episode 51: "The Angel with Two Faces"	
1956	Dangerous Assignment	Hildegarde	Episode 52: "Vienna"	
1958	The Mapmaker	Ann Chappel	Caltex Theatre on 2CA	
1960s	The Big Fisherman			
1960s	From Paris with Love	Martine Cordier		
1960s	The Tilsit Inheritance	Ginny Tilsit		
1961	Cattleman			
	Leave Her to Heaven			
	Requiem for Paul Jason	Janice Gantry		
	The Robe	Diana		
	Starlight Theatre			
	A Relative Affair	Rosemary Linton		
	The Shame of Sefton Ridge			
	Harvest of Hate			
