= Neva Carr Glyn =

Australian actress (1908–1975)

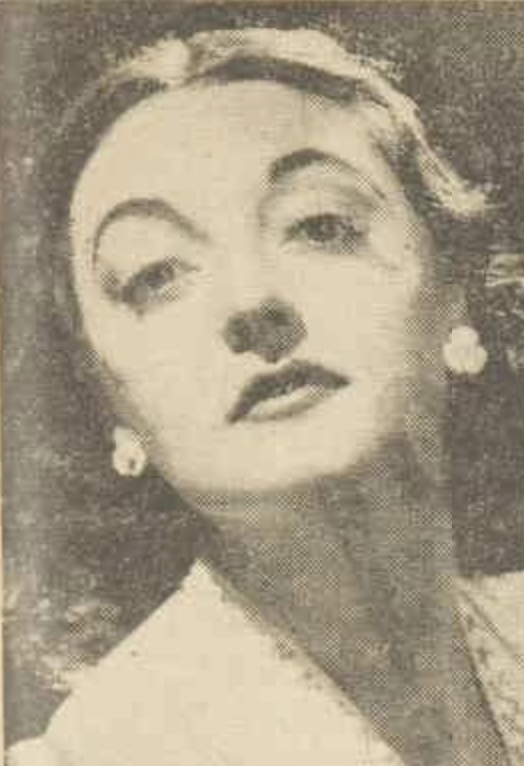
- Glyn c. 1945
- Born: Vera Josephine Mary Carr Glyn; 10 May 1908; Melbourne, Victoria, Australia
- Died: 10 August 1975 (aged 67); Melbourne, Victoria, Australia
- Occupations: Stage and screen actress, radio performer
- Years active: 1908–1975
- Spouse: John Tate (m. 1940; div. 1954)
- Children: Nick Tate

Vera "Neva" Josephine Mary Carr Glyn (10 May 1908 – 10 August 1975) was an Australian stage, film, television and radio actress.

== Early life ==
Carr Glyn was born in Melbourne Australia to Adolphus Benjamin Carr Glyn known professionally as Arthur Carr Glyn (died 16 January 1923), who was a humorous baritone and stage manager born in Belfast, Ireland, (the son of Major Carr Glyn) and Marie Carr Glyn (late Mola), née Marie Dunoon Senior (10 June 1874 – 24 December 1953), a Scottish actress, comedienne and singer with the stage name "Marie Avis". She had one half-sister Gwendoline Arnold O'Neill and two half-brothers Sacheverill Arnold Mola and Rupert Arnold Mola. She was named "Neva" after her great-aunt who was a contralto of some quality. Both spellings of her surname appear in print roughly equally and apparently arbitrarily.

== Early career ==
Neva was born while her parents were with the Fred Niblo company touring the J. C. Williamson circuit. Her theatrical debut was four months later, in New Zealand, when Fred Niblo carried her on stage. She was playing the young William to her mother's Lady Isabel Vane in East Lynne at the age of four.

From age five to twelve, when her father died, she was a boarder in various convent schools, ending in Sydney. At eight she was enrolled in the Minnie Hooper School of Dancing and at eleven she was dancing in a revue The Queen of Sheba at the Sydney Town Hall.

At thirteen her dancing skills won her a place in the chorus line of a Fuller Brothers pantomime Dick Whittington and His Cat at the Majestic Theatre, Newtown then in 1925 toured with the Band Box Revue. For the following six years she worked for them under contract, touring Australia and New Zealand in revues. Robinson Crusoe from 1925 to 1926 as Principal Girl, "Aladdin" 1927–28 as Principal boy and Clowns in Clover for the Frank Neil company are noted appearances, this last starring Roy Rene. Other stars she worked with at this time were Jim Gerald and George Wallace.

In 1929 she and her mother joined the Frank Neil company in a tour of South Africa playing leads in such comedies as Up in Mabel's Room.

She travelled to London in 1931 and got a break with the Firth Shephard company playing the Sigmund Romberg operetta Nina Rosa (produced by Carol Reed) then with Firth Shephard and Leslie Henson in a string of "Aldwych comedies" such as Living Dangerously (1934), Accidentally Yours (1935), and Aren't Men Beasts? in 1936. She also appeared in four movies including Girls, Please! (1934) with Sydney Howard and The Squeaker (1937) with Ann Todd.

There in 1936 she married an Australian grazier named Arthur John but left him when he insisted she give up the stage. In 1937 she returned to Australia and was soon in work, playing in Cinderella (playing Dandini) and other pantomimes by day and revues with Jim Gerald and Ella Shields at night.

== Radio and stage ==
The following year she was working for the Australian Broadcasting Commission doing radio plays with Peter Finch. The two became a famous pair, starring in dozens of dramas including a Max Afford husband-and-wife detective series Greyface as Jeffery and Elizabeth Blackburn. It was around this time that she was given the nickname "Nessie".

In 1940 she married actor John Tate and their son Nick Tate, also an actor was born in 1942. In 1941 they commenced as a husband-and-wife team for the Macquarie network, where they were known as the "sweethearts of radio", playing romantic leads on the Lux Theatre, the premier drama show in the days when radio was king, and the dark-haired imperious Neva was one of the three "Queens of Radio" (with Lyndall Barbour and Thelma Scott). She played Mrs Cogg, the undertaker's wife in the series Granny Martin Steps Out. She also appeared in Star Theatre shows for Macquarie; one series with John Tate, another with Arundel Nixon. She played in the long-running ABC series Blue Hills.

She had not left the stage entirely; in 1944 she and John toured New Zealand, and she had regular appearances at the Minerva Theatre such as Love from a Stranger with Grant Taylor, Clutterbuck, Storm in a Teacup, Separate Rooms and Dangerous Corner by J.B. Priestley. But the marriage was foundering. John went off to Central Australia to live with the Arunta tribe (they divorced in 1954). She joined John Alden's Shakespearean touring company; playing roles such as Portia in The Merchant of Venice, Paulina in A Winter's Tale and Mistress Ford in The Merry Wives of Windsor. In 1957 she joined the Trust Players at the Elizabethan Theatre (the old "Majestic" renamed), also toured performing Richard Beynon's The Shifting Heart and Peter Kenna's Slaughter on St. Teresa's Day. Neva appeared in two episodes of Skippy the Bush Kangaroo, 'Esmerelda' and 'Fred'.

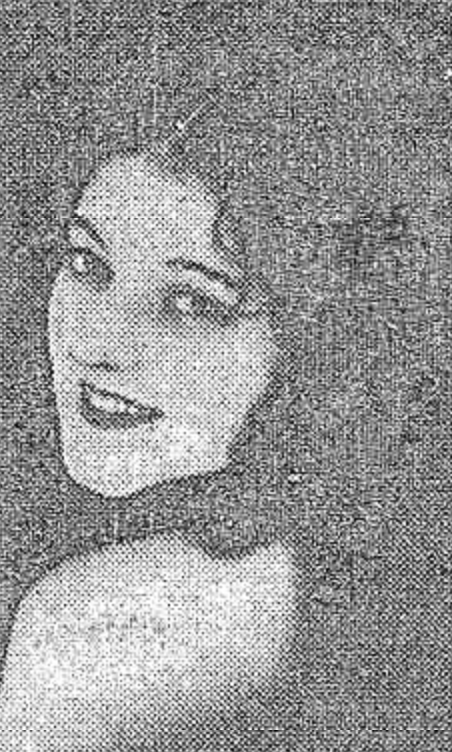
Neva Carr Glyn c. 1926

== Film and television career ==
The world was changing for Neva. Television had taken over as the star medium and required youthful good looks and different skills.

She appeared in Slaughter of St Teresa's Day with Annette Andre who called her "a wonderful actress – I was always terrified of her, she was a really tough lady, but very professional and experienced. I have to say I learned a lot from her." She had played the role on stage.

She was consigned to unsympathetic older roles like Mrs Gillipop in The Gillipops, and in movies like Age of Consent (1969) and Ride a Wild Pony (1975). Her last role was in the ABC-TV series Certain Women. She died mid-series.

== Recognition ==
- In 1950 she won the Macquarie Network's award for "best performance by an actress in a leading role" (in Half Light).
- In 1951 she won the Macquarie Network's award for "best performance by an actress in a leading role" (in If This Be Error).

== Filmography ==
=== Film ===
- Girls, Please! (1934, feature film)
- The Squeaker (aka Murder on Diamond Row) (1937, feature film)
- First Victory Loan: Return Journey (1944, short film)
- Murder Story (1957, TV movie) as Jim Tanner's mother
- The Bastard Country (1959, TV movie) as Connie Naismith
- Harlequinade (1961, TV movie) as Edna Selby
- A Night Out (1961, TV movie) as Mother
- Red Peppers (1962, TV movie)
- Prelude to Harvest (1963, TV movie) as Mrs Barnsley
- Don't Listen Ladies (1963, TV movie) as Julie
- Rape of the Belt (1964, TV movie) as Hera
- A Touch of Gold (1967, TV movie)
- Age of Consent (1969, feature film) as Ma Ryan
- Ride a Wild Pony (1975, feature film) as Miss Gwen

=== Television ===
- The Adventures of Long John Silver (1958)
- The Slaughter of St Teresa's Day (1960)
- Whiplash (1960-61)
- The Mavis Bramston Show (1966)
- A Touch of Gold (1967)
- Skippy the Bush Kangaroo (episodes: 'Esmerelda' and 'Fred') (1967-68)
- The Cousin from Fiji (1972)
- Certain Women

== Stage ==
- East Lynne (1912) as William
- The Queen of Sheba (1919) as a dancer at Sydney Town Hall
- Dick Whittington and His Cat (1921, pantomime) in the chorus line for Fuller Brothers at Majestic Theatre, Newtown
- Band Box Revue (1925-31) (Australia & New Zealand tour)
- Robinson Crusoe (1925-26) as Principal Girl
- Aladdin (1927–28) as Principal Boy
- Clowns in Clover for Frank Neil Company
- Up in Mabel's Room (1929) as Mabel for Frank Neil Company (South African tour)
- Nina Rosa (1931, operetta) for Firth Shephard Company
- Living Dangerously (1934) for Firth Shephard Company
- Accidentally Yours (1935) for Firth Shephard Company
- Aren't Men Beasts? (1936) for Firth Shephard Company
- Cinderella (1937) as Dandini
- Love from a Stranger at Minerva Theatre
- Clutterbuck at Minerva Theatre
- Storm in a Teacup at Minerva Theatre
- Separate Rooms at Minerva Theatre
- Dangerous Corner by J.B. Priestley
- The Merchant of Venice as Portia for John Alden Shakespeare Company
- A Winter's Tale as Paulina for John Alden Shakespeare Company
- The Merry Wives of Windsor as Mistress Ford for John Alden Shakespeare Company
- The Shifting Heart for John Alden Shakespeare Company
- The Bastard Country (1959) as Connie Naismith
- The Slaughter of St Theresa's Day (1960) as Oola Maguire

== Selected radio performances ==
- The Laughing Woman with Peter Finch for the ABC in 1941
- Mrs Parkington with John Saul for Macquarie Network in 1946
- If This Be Error by Rachel Grieve and Mollie Greenhalgh for Macquarie Network 1951
- Shadow of the Vine by Beverley Nichols for the General Motors Hour 1952
- Mildred Pierce by James M. Cain in 1953
