= Reach for the Sky (radio serial) =

1954 Australian radio serial

- ABC Weekly 2 Oct 1954
- Genre: drama serial
- Running time: 30 mins (9:00 pm – 9:30 pm)
- Country of origin: Australia
- Language: English
- Starring: Rod Taylor
- Created by: book Reach for the Sky by Paul Brickhill
- Written by: Morris West
- Directed by: Gordon Grimsdale
- Original release: August 1954 – 1955
- No. of series: 1
- No. of episodes: 52

Reach for the Sky is a 1954 Australian radio serial based on the book of the same name by Australian author Paul Brickhill which was a biography of Douglas Bader. It was one of the most acclaimed Australian radio dramas of the 1950s, and a notable success for Rod Taylor who played Bader.

The novel had been a huge best seller, selling almost 100,000 copies in Australia alone.

The script was written by Morris West who had adapted other Brickhill books for radio such as The Dambusters and The Great Escape, both of which also starred Taylor.

== Reception ==
According to Gordon Grimsdale who directed in the scene where Bader "is informed of the loss of both his legs, a halt in production had to be called to allow several members of the cast to recover from the emotional stress of the scene."

The Advocate wrote "Mr. West has excelled himself in this adaptation... would be a pity to miss such a presentation of so moving and gallant a story."

The Adelaide Mail called it "excellent radio".

The Daily Telegraph said Taylor gave "one of the most moving performances I have yet heard from any radio actor, either here or abroad."

== Cast ==
- Rod Taylor and then Bruce Stewart as Douglas Bader
- Neva Carr Glynn
- James Mills
- David Nettheim
- Madge Ryan
- Margo Lee
- Dinah Shearing
