= Man of Letters =

Man of Letters may refer to:

- Man of letters
- Man of Letters (film), a 1984 television film
