= Hart of the Territory =

1951 Australian radio serial

- Genre: drama serial
- Country of origin: Australia
- Language: English
- Written by: Tony Scott Veitch
- Produced by: Colin Cragin
- Recording studio: Sydney
- Original release: 1951 – 1952

ABC Weekly 27 October 1951

Hart of the Territory is a 1951 Australian radio serial by Anthony Scott Veitch and produced by Colin Cragin. It was set in the Northern Territory. Sydney John Kay wrote the music. Extensive research went into the scripts.

The show aired Monday to Thursday nights with episodes going for fifteen minutes.

The show ran until late 1952.

The Adelaide Mail said "the virility of Hart of the Territory is a welcome change after a surfeit of soap operas."

The Daily Telegraph said "The script is so admirably laconic, and the acting held in such restraint; that the story concerning enemy spies in the Rum Jungle – becomes mighty convincing."

The series was repeated in 1956.

== Premise ==
Gil Hart, a city man, inherits a station in the Territory.

== Cast ==
- Charles Tingwell as Gil Hart
- Ken Wayne
- Margaret Christensen as Leslie Winters
- Dinah Shearing
- Lloyd Berrell
- Brian Wright as Narrator
- Frank Waters
- Wendy Playfair
- Alfred Bristowe
- Ron Whelan
