= The Bastard Country =

1959 play by Anthony Coburn

- Original language: English
- Written by: Anthony Coburn
- Genre: drama
- Setting: A farm on the Victorian-New South Wales border

Premiere
- Date: 6 May 1959
- Place: Elizabethan Theatre Trust, Sydney
- Directed by: Robin Lovejoy

The Bastard Country is a 1959 Australian play by Anthony Coburn. It was also known as Fire on the Wind.

The play was a finalist in the 1957 London Observer playwriting competition. Anthony Coburn, an Australian who lived in London since 1950, says he deliberately picked the title because "I wanted something to catch the judges' attention."

It was performed by the Australian Elizabethan Theatre Trust in 1959. It was the third play of the season that year. Director Robin Lovejoy called it "probably the most violent play in plot and language that has been seen in Sydney for many years. Many people think it an unreal picture of Australian life. But all the violence grows inevitably out of the characters as people, not because they are specifically Australian."

Grant Taylor played the key role.

The play was toured around the country along with two other Trust productions Man and Superman and Long Day's Journey into Night. For this run it was retitled Fire on the Wind.

== Adaptations ==
It was adapted for radio in 1960.

== Plot ==
John Willy is a violent man who owns a farm in northern Victoria and has a mistress, Connie. He is visited by Greek Nick Diargos, who intends to kill him as revenge for raping and murdering Nick's wife in Greece when John was a soldier.

However he falls for John's daughter Mary.

== Original cast ==
- Neva Carr Glyn as Connie Naismith
- Patricia Conolly as May Willy
- Neil Fitzpatrick as Possum Willy
- Ron Haddrick as Doctor Gorman
- Rodney Milgate as Billy Willy
- Desmond Rolfe as Jim Richards
- Grant Taylor as Nick Diargos
- Frank Waters as John Willy

== Reception ==
The Sydney Morning Herald said "the play is built so that its situations will hit hard and sensationally but it is not play which much to prove beyond the simple collisions of its plot." It praised the direction and the acting, saying Taylor gives "probably the finest performance of his career."

The Sydney Tribune said the 1959 production featured "one of the finest performances that this reviewer has seen on the Elizabethan stage— that of Grant Taylor's portrayal of Nick Diargos, the vengeance-seeking Greek. He invests Diargos with an awe-inspiring strength and yet with gentleness and dignity and his performance is one of the main reasons for the play's great impact on the audience."

== British productions ==
The play made its British debut at the Birmingham Repertory Company in August 1960. The cast included Brian Blessed. The Guardian called it "a good play... a close fresh direct look at people." Kenneth Tynan in the Observer said it was "a fierce, crude, ham-fisted play reminiscent of O'Neill" where "the last act swoops disastrously into melodrama" but added "a long time had passed since I saw a play that cried out more vociferously for movie treatment in the grand, outdoor manner."

The production was not financially successful.

The play was produced in Manchester in 1964 and Stoke-on-Trent in 1966.
