= Overland Patrol =

British radio drama series

Overland Patrol is a 1965 BBC radio drama series set in Australia. It originally starred Grant Taylor then he was replaced by Charles Tingwell. Episodes went for 30 minutes. It ran until 1967.

The writers included Maurice Travers and Anthony Scott Veitch. The producer was Vernon Harris.

The series aired on Australian radio.

== Premise ==
Sgt Adam Strang investigates crimes in the Australian outback.

== Cast ==
- Grant Taylor as Sgt Adam Strang
- Brian McDermott as Constable Michael Dawson

== Select episodes ==
1. The Long, Hot, Dusty Day - Strang is given a young constable to help him who is from England.
2. The Long Stringer - Strang deals with horsebreaker 'Stringer' Long
3. The Place Where Eagles Drink - the search for an eloping couple
4. The Old Hand - Strang deals with an old soldier
5. Red Eyes in the River
6. The Blind Water Hen
7. Chinaman's Luck
8. Black Opal
9. The No Hoper
10. Spanish Gold
11. The Bower Bird
12. The Waterloo Coat
13. The Poddy Dodger
14. The Sundowners (Tingwell replaced Taylor)
15. Children of the Dreamtime
16. The Old Mates
17. Gun Licence
18. Walkabout
19. The Man from Thursday
20. Eye of the Tracker
21. Boomerang
22. Carey's Brand
23. Road Train
24. The Spinner
25. The Corinthian Cup
26. The Big Sky
27. Home for Christmas
28. The Wells of Mataranka
29. The Inlanders
30. Never Never Mailman
31. Mirage
32. Cannon's Circus
33. The Crow Strangler
34. The Ear Basher
35. The Painted Caves
36. The Arnhem Land Lily
37. The Old Man of Oorawalla
38. Bird of Passage
39. A Bangtail Muster
