= Opal of Destiny =

- Newcastle Herald 2 Sept 1952
- Genre: drama serial
- Running time: 15 mins (9:00 pm – 9:15 pm)
- Country of origin: Australia
- Language: English
- Home station: 2UW
- Starring: Harp McGuire
- Written by: Anthony Scott Veitch
- Directed by: Tom Farley
- Recording studio: Sydney
- Original release: September 1 – December 31, 1952
- No. of series: 1
- No. of episodes: 52

ABC Weekly 6 Sept 1952

Opal of Destiny is a 1952 Australian radio serial written by Anthony Scott Veitch and directed by Tom Farley.

There were 52 episodes and the serial was recorded in advance of broadcast. It was made by the Columbia George Edwards Production Company, who had an exclusive deal with 2UW in Sydney.

== Premise ==
An ex-US naval pilot comes to Australia to start life anew and winds up in Lightning Ridge.

== Cast ==
- Harp McGuire
- Alan White
- Paul McNaughton
- David Eadie
- Tom Farley
- Rodney Taylor
- Grant Taylor
- Brian Wright
- Alan Trevor
- Marie Clark
- Diana Davidson
- Jean Robertson

== Reception ==
The Daily Telegraph said "This gives a carelessly written, shoddily acted picture of an American in Paddo a poor pastiche, blotched with all the naughtiest hues of Harlem, and daubed with, some of the ruddier tints of Broadway's café-society. Let us have no more of these pallid imitations. New York and Chicago have had both gang warfare and a distinguished, if eccentric, elite. Sydney has had neither worth mentioning. If our authors wish to be nationally and authentic ally husky, let them start writing about; the Pushes."
