= Anthony Scott Veitch =

Australian writer

Anthony Scott Veitch (6 January 1914 – 23 February 1983) was an Australian writer of radio, films, novels and TV. He worked for a number of years in British film and TV. His feature credits include The Kangaroo Kid (1950) and Coast of Skeletons (1964). He wrote more than 100 novels, including westerns and historical fiction.

== Biography ==
Veitch was born in Scotland. He moved to Australia when he was fourteen. He did a variety of jobs, then joined the church and studied for two years before deciding to leave.

Veitch worked in publicity and broke into radio writing the radio adaptation of the film Rhodes of Africa in 1936 then he joined to company of James Raglan.

While writing he was advertising manager for 2KO, Newcastle, and servied in the army in intelligence. After the war he focused on writing.

== Select credits ==
- Rhodes of Africa (1936) - radio play
- The Queen's Necklace (1938) - radio
- historical pageant on Methodism (1945)
- Mutiny on the Bounty (1941) - radio serial
- Road to Tokyo (1945)
- Fog Bound (1947) - stage play
- Courage (1947) - radio feature
- Torch of Remembrance (1947) - radio feature
- Grief Goes Over (1947) - radio play
- Shadow radio
- The Strange Destiny of Lady Stanhope - radio serial
- Transatlantic Liner - radio serial
- Shenandoah (1947)
- Mantle of Greatness (1948) - radio series
- The Tender Heart (1948–52) - radio serial
- The Second Mrs Manning (1949) - radio serial
- Fly Away Peter (1949) - radio play
- The Saxby Millions (1949) - radio serial
- Short Story (1950) - radio play
- The Kangaroo Kid (1950) - feature film
- The Remarkable Mr Robinson (1950) radio play
- Vengeance is Mine (1951) - radio serial
- Dangerous Lady (1951) - radio serial
- Harp in the South (1951) - radio serial
- Hart of the Territory (1951) - radio serial
- Apple Trees (1952) - radio serial
- Opal of Destiny (1952) - radio serial
- Shirley Butler (1953) - radio feature
- The Battling Bensons - radio serial
- Parrish without Gates (1955) - radio feature
- No Hiding Place (1963) - TV episode
- Crane (1964) - TV episode
- Coast of Skeletons - film
- This Man Craig - TV episode
- Overland Patrol (1966–67) - radio adventure series
- Champion House (1967) - TV episode
- Six Steps in the Dark (1967) - radio play
- The Young Pioneers (1967) radio serial about Auystralia in the 1830s
- The Bloody Judge (1970) - film
- Mister Pybus (1970) - radio series
- The View from Mount Stromlo (1973) - radio play
- The Darling Darcy (1973) - radio play
- Ricochet (1974) - radio thriller series
- Northward the Coast (1978) - radio play
- Blindworm (1978) radio serial
- The Seafarer (1979) - radio serial about Mary Bryant
- A Crying in the Night (1979) - radio play based on the life of Frederick Bailey Deeming - won Awgie
- Spindrift: The Mary Bryant Story (1980) - book
- Run from the Morning (1980) - book
- Roses and Boronia (1980) - radio serial
- Roses and Boronia (1981) - novel
- Cat in a Pepper Tree (1982) radio serial
- The Currency Lass
