= A Little South of Heaven =

- Based on: radio play by D'Arcy Niland; Ruth Park
- Written by: George F. Kerr
- Directed by: Alan Burke
- Starring: Owen Weingott
- Country of origin: Australia
- Original language: English

Production
- Producer: Les Weldon
- Running time: 60 mins
- Production company: ABC

Original release
- Release: 19 April 1961 (Sydney)
- Release: 13 September 1961 (Melbourne, taped)

A Little South of Heaven is Australian live television play which aired in 1961 on ABC. It was based on a radio play by D'Arcy Niland and Ruth Park.

== Plot ==
Set in Sydney. An Italian widow who has moved to Australia plans a marriage for her son Primo to an Italian, Serena, despite his affections for an Australian, Ruby. However he sends Serena the photo of Primo's more handsome cousin Franki.

== Cast ==
- Lyndall Barbour as Mama Chiapetta
- Owen Weingott as Primo
- Henry Gilbert as Father Felix
- Delore Whiteman as Ruby
- Ben Gabriel as Eddy
- Anthony Wickert as Franki
- Victoria Anoux as Serena
- Alma Butterfield as Mrs Stringer

== Radio play ==
It was based on a radio play that had been performed in Australia and on the BBC in 1960. The BBC production starred Ina De La Haye and Robert Rietty.

The story has some similarities with the stage play They Knew What They Wanted.

== Reception ==
A TV critic from The Sydney Morning Herald called it "rather stale fare" as the plot and characters were too predictable, adding that thematically the play "a warm-blooded extension of an Immigration Department pamphlet; bur its mainspring was a device as old as comedy and diplomacy... A neat, visually fluent, but also stodgily predictable, 60 minutes of viewing."

Val Marshall of the same paper thought it was almost as good as The Big Day, "a play that has remained pretty much par for the course for Australian TV drama ever since". She felt "in spite of some miscasting and an occasional spot where action bogged down in words... [it] came off remarkably well."

== See also ==
- List of television plays broadcast on Australian Broadcasting Corporation (1960s)
