= Alma Butterfield =

Australian writer and actress

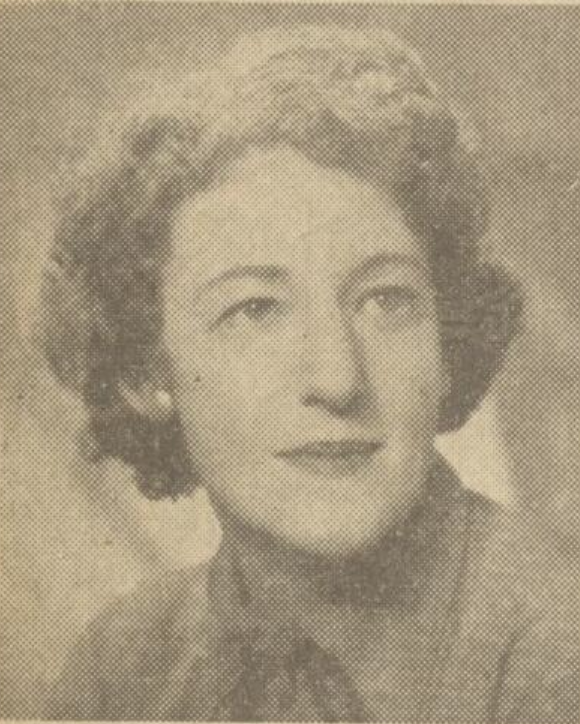
- Born: Melbourne, Victoria
- Occupations: Actress and writer

Alma Butterfield was an Australian writer and character actress. She worked with the Melbourne Little Theatre, early in her career, but was best known for her work on radio including the Gwen Meredith serials The Lawsons and a long stint on its sequel Blue Hills as Mrs. Jenkins. According to one critic her performance in TV movie The Slaughter of St Terese's Day was "sublime: she brilliantly encapsulates an entire generation of Australian womanhood, with her hunched shoulders, faded dress, mangled vocabulary and verbal sniping."

As a writer she authored six children's stories, two children's plays and several poems, as well as contributing humorous stories to magazines.

== Select credits ==
=== Television ===
- The Slaughter of St Teresa's Day (TV movie) (1960)
- A Little South of Heaven (TV movie) (1961)

=== Radio ===
- The Lawsons as Mrs. Brown
- Blue Hills - Mrs Jenkins
- Hagens Circus - (radio)
- Aunt Jenny Real Life Stories
