= First Victory Loan: Return Journey =

- Directed by: Ken G. Hall
- Written by: Robert MacKinnon
- Produced by: Ken G. Hall
- Starring: Neva Carr-Glynn; John Tate
- Cinematography: Bert Nicholas
- Edited by: William Shepherd
- Production company: Cinesound Productions
- Release date: 1944
- Running time: 13 minutes
- Country: Australia
- Language: English

First Victory Loan: Return Journey is a short documentary film directed by Ken G. Hall made to encourage people to subscribe to the First Victory Loan.

== Plot ==
A Padre visits the Davidson Family to console the mother and wife of an Australian soldier killed at the front.

Attempting to calm the angry wife, the padre relates his experience of his ship being torpedoed and then being stranded at sea on an open lifeboat for many days. One of the two who died of wounds on the lifeboat was the Padre's only brother.

== Cast ==
- John Tate
- Neva Carr Glynn
- Ronald Whelan
- Marshall Crosby
- Joe Valli
