= Julie Was =

- Genre: drama play
- Running time: 75 mins (8:00 pm – 9:00 pm)
- Country of origin: Australia
- Language: English
- Home station: 2BL
- Syndicates: ABC
- Starring: Patricia Connolly
- Written by: Peter Kenna
- Directed by: Leslie Rees
- Original release: August 3, 1959

Julie Was is a 1959 Australian radio play by Peter Kenna. It was his first radio play and followed his debut as a writer with The Slaughter of St Teresa's Day.

According to Leslie Rees, it "showed with some unusual emotional truth the life of a small-town girl, spoilt and bored, a kind of junior rural Hedda Gabler, a liar and a trouble-maker, who sought the love denied her by her mother’s defection, but met her match in a young schoolteacher."

According to the ABC, "in a play that is critical of a certain type of person, Kenna is both fluent and sensitive. with hints of Tennessee Williams and even Ibsen, but with a clearly observed Australian theme and setting. "

The play was repeated in 1960. A copy of the script is at the Hangar Library.

== Premise ==
"Julie is the spoilt only child of Mick Grant, easy-going owner of the local pub in a country town. Mick’s beautiful wife left him when Julie was a baby. Julie, spoilt and bored, is a liar and a trouble-maker: yet she seeks the affection denied her bv her mother’s defection. Her father has always given her whatever she wanted, and she doesn’t realise that there is anything she cannot have simply by demanding it. Then a new school teacher comes to the little town, young, handsome Matthew O’Donnell. Julie decides that she wants him. Unhappily for her, Matthew' has other ideas."
