= The Tender Heart =

- ABC Weekly 25 Oct 1952
- Genre: drama serial
- Running time: 15 mins (11:45 am – 12:00 am)
- Country of origin: Australia
- Language: English
- Starring: Muriel Steinbeck
- Written by: Anthony Scott Veitch
- No. of series: 1
- No. of episodes: 52

The Tender Heart is a 1948 Australian radio serial by Anthony Scott Veitch. It starred Muriel Steinbeck. The serial debuted in 1948 and was repeated in 1952.

The show was made for Hepworth Productions.

A copy of the serial is held by the National Film and Sound Archive.

== Premise ==
According to The Sun, the series was "about an attractive and clever young nurse who is emotionally involved with a handsome doctor (naturally) and an artist."

== Cast ==
- Muriel Steinbeck
- Alan White
- Moray Powell
- Frank Waters as Peter Thorpe
- Athol Fleming
