= Macbeth (1960 Australian film) =

1960 film by William Sterling

- Based on: play by William Shakespeare
- Directed by: William Sterling
- Music by: Robert Hughes
- Country of origin: Australia
- Original language: English

Production
- Running time: 90 minutes
- Production company: ABC

Original release
- Network: ABC
- Release: 7 September 1960 (Melbourne)
- Release: 19 October 1960 (Sydney)
- Release: 19 August 1962 (Brisbane)

Macbeth is a 1960 Australian TV film based on the play by William Shakespeare. It was directed by William Sterling.

The ABC would present another version of the play in 1965.

== Cast ==
- Kenneth Goodlet as Macbeth
- Keith Eden as Macduff
- Christine Hill
- Douglas Kelly as Duncan
- Mark Kelly
- Rod Milgate as Malcolm
- Wynn Roberts as Banquo
- Dinah Shearing as Lady Macbeth

== Production ==
The play was filmed in conjunction with The Life and Death of Richard II which was shot in Sydney. Macbeth had several months of planning and rehearsals. Nine sets were used. There was location filming at Beaconsfield and Cape Schank (for the witches scene). It was set in the eleventh century and was described as akin to Orson Welles' 1948 film production of the play.

Barry Creyton has a small role. "I literally carried a spear," he later said.

== Reception ==
The Sydney Morning Herald wrote that the production as "visually efficient" but also "a dreadful warning of what can happen when a producer becomes frightened of a great text... a torrent of gabble and shouting. Some of the most concise dramatic poetry in all Shakespeare received treatment worthy of the race results."

The Age said it was an "inordinately successful presentation." In its year review of drama, that paper said it was one of the "outstanding" productions of the year.
