= Vengeance is Mine (radio serial) =

- Daily Telegraph 11 Nov 1952
- Genre: drama serial
- Running time: 60 mins (8:00 pm – 9:00 pm)
- Country of origin: Australia
- Language: English
- Home station: 2UW
- Starring: Muriel Steinbeck
- Written by: Anthony Scott Veitch
- Recording studio: Sydney
- Original release: 21 October 1951

Vengeance is Mine is a 1951 Australian radio serial written by Tony Scott Veitch starring Grant Taylor and Muriel Steinbeck.

Episodes went for one hour.

== Premise ==
According to ABC Weekly "With the death of Tennyson Grey, a web of intrigue is spun against his wife, Elizabeth. A whispering campaign is started libelling this young and attractive woman. Soon the villagers are showing resentment against the lady whose aloofness is dubbed haughtiness, whose refusal to subscribe to a public monument of Tennyson Grey is called a scandal and a callous disregard for a great man’s memory. Rumours multiply, gossip flies from house to house, and it is only the devotion of Tim Kinnane, who steam-rollers opposition and drags whispers into the open, that clears her name."

== Cast ==
- John Tate as Tennyson Grey
- Muriel Steinbeck as Tennyson Grey's wife, Lady Elizabeth
- Grant Taylor as Tim Kinnane
