= The Slaughter of St Teresa's Day =

Play by Peter Kenna and TV adaptation

The Slaughter of St. Teresa's Day
- SMH 8 Match 1959
- Original language: English
- Written by: Peter Kenna
- Subject: Catholicism families
- Setting: Kings Cross, Sydney

Premiere
- Date: 11 March 1959
- Place: Elizabethan Theatre Trust, Sydney

The Slaughter of St. Teresa's Day is a play by Australian author Peter Kenna.

== Plot ==
Oola Maguire, a bookie, holds a party every St. Teresa's Day. The guests are the people she has quarreled with in the past year, and there is only one rule: Firearms must be parked in the hall. Her daughter Thelma is brought home from the convent she attends with two nuns.

== Background ==
SMH 16 March 1959

It won a National Playwrights Competition in 1958 and was produced in Sydney the following year by the Australian Elizabethan Theatre Trust. The judges of the competition were Hugh Hunt and Kylie Tennant.

Judge Kylie Tennant called it "a witty commentary on human behaviour, passion, pride and vanity and the curious innocence which keeps people lovable for all their cunning and downright wickedness. It has humour, tolerance and the ability to bring people on the stage alive."

Kenna wrote the play while rehearsing in The Bells Are Ringing at the Princess Theatre in Melbourne. "Sometimes its easier to write when you have to squeeze time in for writing", he said.

Kenna said the play was "about outlaws. Not outlaws in the sense that they are rejected by society, but outlaws in the sense that they break some of the rules."

Kenna revised the play for publication by Currency Press in 1972. According to one account "Some scenes have been re-written so that what was formerly spelt out in dialogue is now left to visual symbolism and the audience's imagination; an entire scene in which the statue of St Teresa was smashed has been removed. Not only did this parallel too closely the smashing of the dolls in 'The Summer of the Seventeenth Doll' but its purpose was only to underline a point already well established."

== 1959 original stage production ==
SMH 11 March 1959

The original 1959 stage production was directed by Robin Lovejoy. It was the fourth "straight" Australian play from the Elizabethan Theatre Trust.

Kenna wrote the part of Oona for Neva Carr Glynn. "It's one of the most difficult parts I've had", she said. "But it's a magnificent one."

=== Original cast ===
- Neva Carr Glynn as Oola Maguire
- Grant Taylor as Horrie Darcel
- Dinah Shearing as Wilma Cartwright
- Frank Waters as Paddy Maguire
- Dorothy Whitely as Essie Farrell
- Des Rolfe as Charlie Gibson
- Patricia Connolly as Thelma
- Rodney Milgate as Whitey Maguire
- Diana Bell as Sister Mary Francis
- Philippa Baker as Sister Mary Mark
- Mary Mackay as Sister Mary Luke
- Reg Lye as Barney

=== Reception ===
The Sydney Morning Herald said the play "has the kind of power and color to give much incidental excitement immediately to an audience."

The Sydney Tribune said it was "a play that every theatre-lover should see; whether you like it or loathe it, you won't be bored by it." The Woman's Weekly called it "a lively, amusing play that deserves a good run."

The Bulletin called it "a study in opposites, but there is no real conflict. The main action is between mother and daughter, and since from Act I mother has acquiesced in daughter's going into a convent, if only to get rid of her, there is no real feeling of a problem solved when she goes there. A play like this, fact piled on fact, spaced-out by "delicious cameos", or conversation pieces that hold-up the plot, increases one's regressive nostalgia for the play-of-stratagem, where a conflict of wills produces a swift continuity of action and counteraction."

Reviewing it years later, Filmink magazine said the play "has a brilliant core character, a fascinating world, a rogue's gallery of colourful support players, clever dramatic set-ups that you know are going to be paid off in exciting ways (“guns left at the door”, “no drinking”), and a very solid dramatic situation (a gangster tries to seduce a criminal mother and convent-educated daughter). Kenna writes with a wonderful compassion, humour and empathy for these outsiders; he seems to like, and understand, all his characters, be they prostitutes, murderers or nuns."

== 1960 Australian TV adaptation ==
See The Slaughter of St. Teresa's Day (1960 film)

== Radio ==
Kenna adapted the play for radio in a version which broadcast in 1960 and 1961.

== 1962 British TV adaptation ==
The Slaughter of St. Teresa's Day
- Written by: Peter Kenna
- Produced by: John Jacobs
- Starring: Susannah York
- Release date: 6 April 1962
- Running time: 75 mins
- Country: United Kingdom
- Language: English

The play was filmed by the BBC in 1962, when Kenna was living in England.

The Sunday Times reviewing a later Kenna play Goodbye Gloria Goodbye said it was "not wholly successful, but like Kenna's earlier The Slaughter of St Teresa's Day... of a distinctive flavour"

=== Cast ===
- Susannah York as Thelma Maguire
- Madge Ryan as Oola Maguire
- Vincent Ball as Horrie Darcel
- Maggie Fitzgibbon as Wilma
- J.G. Devlin as Paddy Maguire
- Molly Urquhart as Sister Mary Luke
- Margaret Wedlake as Sister Mary Mark
- Ethel Gabriel as Essie Farrell
- Johnny Briggs as Whitey Maguire
- John Tate (actor) as Charlie
- Reg Lye as Barney

=== Radio ===
The play also aired on British radio in 1963.
