= Shenandoah (radio play) =

- Genre: Drama serial
- Running time: 15 minutes
- Country of origin: Australia
- Language: English
- Starring: Grant Taylor
- Written by: Anthony Scott Veitch
- Original release: 1947
- Sponsored by: Qantas

Shenandoah is a 1947 Australian radio serial about a horse that wins the Melbourne Cup. Episodes went for 15 minutes.

It was written by Anthony Scott Veitch and made by AWA. One of the sponsors was Qantas.

The Brisbane Telegraph said "the author... or someone acting in an advisory capacity has achieved the authentic touch. This is station life — to the life. The story though richly melodramatic, is good radio; and characters are well drawn."

== Cast ==
- Grant Taylor as Rick Ballantyne
- Madeleine Howell
- Lou Vernon as Doc O'Banion
