= Mutiny on the Bounty (radio serial) =

- Daily Examiner 3 March 1938
- Genre: drama serial
- Country of origin: Australia
- Language: English
- Starring: Harvey Adams
- Written by: Anthony Scott Veitch
- Directed by: Harvey Adams
- Original release: 1938 – 1938
- No. of series: 1
- No. of episodes: 52

Wireless Weekly 11 Feb 1938

Mutiny on the Bounty is a 1938 Australian radio serial about the Mutiny on the Bounty. It was written by Anthony Scott Veitch and directed by Harvey Adams, who also starred.

According to one account "Probably never before in Australian radio drama has such a cast been assembled to make a drama, nor have such care and expense been lavished on a radio production."

The show was a milestone in the career of Scott Veith and included a number of actors who became film stars including Peter Finch and Ron Randell.

The show was repeated in 1941.

== Cast ==
- Harvey Adams as Captain Bligh
- Leonard Bennett as Fletcher Christian
- Lew Warton as Burkitt
- Sidney Wheeler
- Victor Gouriet
- Lou Vernon as Mr. Samuel
- Peter Finch as James Morrison
- Gwen Munro as Talua, the native wife of Christian
- Lola Kelly as Luana, a native girl
- Duncan MacDougall as the fiddler, Michael Byrne
- Ron Randell as Tinkler
- Reg Hawthorn as John Fryer
- Alex Davidson as the surgeon
- Bert Barton as Churchill
- George Hewlett,
- John Fernside
- James Raglan,
