= Dinah Shearing =

Australian actress (1926–2021)

- Born: Dinah Hilary Shearing; 12 February 1926; Sydney, Australia
- Died: 14 June 2021 (aged 95); Erina, New South Wales, Australia
- Education: East Sydney Technical College; Sydney Conservatorium of Music
- Occupations: Actress, singer

Dinah Hilary Shearing AM (12 February 1926 – 14 June 2021) also known as Dinah Hilary Milgate, was an Australian actress and singer, active in all facets of the industry, she played numerous character role's on television in many internationally renowned series. but was in particular best known locally in theatre and radio.

== Early life and education ==
Dinah Hilary Shearing was born on 12 February 1926 in Sydney, to English parents, while they were visiting Australia. Growing up alongside two sisters, she attended school in Birmingham in the UK, before the family permanently relocated to Australia when Shearing was twelve, where she attended a public school in Sydney.

With a talent for art, at the age of 15, Shearing gained a scholarship at the East Sydney Technical College (now the National Art School) At the end of her third year, she worked at a Sydney department store during a three month break from school. Upon seeing some of her art, her manager offered her a position as a sketch artist for the store. Having fallen behind in her art studies, Shearing opted not to complete them. During this time, she was also studying singing at Sydney Conservatorium of Music, where she attained honours in exams to A.Mus.A in 1945.

== Career ==
Shearing appeared on stage, radio, television and films in a career that spanned more than 60 years.

After graduating from her studies, Shearing performed in a small musical comedy group, touring army camps. She then began acting with May Hollinworth's Metropolitan Theatre in Sydney, landing her first role in the play Winterset.

After further roles with the Metropolitan Theatre, Shearing's "distinctively mellifluous voice" led to her being recruited into radio during its so-called "Golden Era". Her first broadcast was on the Macquarie Network in a play entitled The Mariners. She soon became a national favourite in Grace Gibson Productions serials such as Dr Paul (in which she played the leading character for ten years), Tudor Princess and Tudor Queen, as well as Dossier on Dumetrius. Other radio serials and programmes included The Colgate Hour, Macquarie Radio Theatre, Lux Radio Theatre and most notably, work with the Australian Broadcasting Corporation.

From there, Shearing was drafted into the Elizabethan Theatre Trust and later, the Old Tote Theatre Company and gave performances that "transcended her young years", touring nationally from her Sydney base. Most memorably, she gave what critics called "the definitive" performance of Mary Tyrone in Eugene O'Neill's Long Day's Journey into Night. She also worked with the Sydney Theatre Company, Melbourne Theatre Company and Independent Theatre. Her performances drew admiring reviews from Sydney critics, including Lindsay Brown, Harry Kippax, and Geoffrey Thomas.

Shearing also appeared in some of Australia's earliest television dramas. making her TV debut in the ABC play A Phoenix Too Frequent in 1957. She also starred as Lady Macbeth in 1960 TV production of Macbeth. After taking a hiatus from performing to raise a family, Shearing returned to the small screen in 1970, with a guest appearance in the drama series Delta.

Further television credits included TV Spells Magic, Catwalk, The Sullivans, All The Rivers Run, Five Mile Creek, The Harp in the South, E Street, A Country Practice, G.P., All Saints and the TV movie Man of Letters. She also had a regular role in soap opera Family and Friends. Her final television appearance was in the sci-fi series Farscape in 2002.

Shearing became a Member of the Order of Australia in the Queen's Birthday Honours in June 1993.

== Honours and awards ==
| Year | Work | Award | Category | Result | Ref. |
|---|---|---|---|---|---|
| 1952 | One Way Street | Macquarie Award | Best Female Lead | Won | |
| 1985 | Man of Letters | Penguin Award | | Won | |
| 1985 | All the Rivers Run | Penguin Award | | Commendation | |
| 1993 | Coriolanus | Critics Award | | Won | |
| 1993 | Lifetime of Excellence | Glugs Theatrical Award | | Won | |
| 1993 | Dinah Shearing | Queen's Birthday Honours | Member of the Order of Australia | Honoured | |
| 1999 | A Delicate Balance | Glugs Theatrical Award | Norman Kessell Award | Won | |

== Personal life ==
Shearing met playwright and painter Rodney Milgate in London and 18 months later, on 9 May 1960 they were married in Woollahra, Sydney at All Saints Church – the same church in which her parents were married. The couple had two sons.

Shearing was a speaker for Heart Research Institute from 1993 to 1999, and a volunteer reader for Royal Society for the Blind in the 1960s.

== Later life and death ==
In later life Shearing resided at Erina, New South Wales, on the NSW Central Coast, and was active in community arts programmes, volunteer work, and had also branched into directing not long before her death.

She died on 14 June 2021, aged 95. She was survived by her two sons and four grandchildren. Her husband, Milgate died in 2014.

== Theatre ==
| Year | Title | Role | Type | Ref. |
|---|---|---|---|---|
| 1946 | Winterset | Street Urchin | Metropolitan Theatre, Sydney, St Peters Church Hall, Sydney | |
| 1946 | Hotel Universe | | St Peters Church Hall, Sydney | |
| 1947 | The Country Wife | Lady Fidget | Metropolitan Theatre, Sydney | |
| 1947 | Ned Kelly | Mrs Barry | Metropolitan Theatre, Sydney | |
| 1947 | Deep are the Roots | | New Theatre, Sydney | |
| 1948 | The First Joanna | Joan Deveron | Metropolitan Theatre Sydney | |
| 1948 | A Midsummer Night's Dream | Fairy | Metropolitan Theatre Sydney, Killara Soldiers Memorial Hall | |
| 1949 | Twelfth Night | Viola | Metropolitan Theatre Sydney, Killara Soldiers Memorial Hall | |
| 1950 | Amphitryon 38 | | Independent Theatre, Sydney | |
| 1950 | Young Wives' Tale | Sabina | Lux Radio Theatre on 2GB, 3DB, 4BK, 5AD | |
| 1951 | King Lear | Regan | St James' Hall, Sydney with John Alden Company | |
| 1952 | The Relapse | Berinthia | | |
| 1952 | A Phoenix Too Frequent | Dynamene | Mercury Theatre | |
| 1953 | The Holly and the Ivy | Margaret | | |
| 1956 | Twelfth Night | Viola | Elizabethan Theatre, Sydney, Comedy Theatre, Melbourne, Playhouse, Perth with J. C. Williamson's | |
| 1956–1957 | The Rivals | Lydia Languish | Australian tour | |
| | Invitation to a Voyage | | | |
| | Bell Book and Candle | | | |
| 1957 | The Relapse | Berinthia | Elizabethan Theatre, Sydney, Playhouse, Perth | |
| 1957–1958 | The Shifting Heart | Maria Fowler | Australian tour with AETT | |
| 1959 | Man and Superman | Ann Whitefield | Elizabethan Theatre Sydney, Playhouse, Perth | |
| 1959 | Long Day's Journey into Night | Mary Cavan Tyrone | Elizabethan Theatre Sydney, Playhouse, Perth | |
| 1959 | Fire on the Wind | | National Theatre, Launceston, Playhouse, Perth | |
| 1959 | Julius Caesar | Portia | Elizabethan Theatre Sydney | |
| 1959 | The Slaughter of St Teresa's Day | Wilma Cartwright | Elizabethan Theatre Sydney | |
| 1960 | The Rape of the Belt | | Elizabethan Theatre Sydney | |
| 1960 | Murder in the Cathedral | Chorus | University of Adelaide | |
| 1964 | A Phoenix Too Frequent | | | |
| 1965 | The Country Wife | | UNSW Old Tote Theatre, Sydney | |
| 1966 | Tiny Alice | | UNSW Old Tote Theatre, Sydney | |
| 1966 | Persephone | | Sydney Symphony Orchestra | |
| 1972–1973 | An Ideal Husband | Lady Chiltern | Comedy Theatre, Melbourne, Her Majesty's Theatre, Brisbane, Playhouse, Perth with MTC | |
| 1973 | King Richard II | Duchess of York | Sydney Opera House | |
| 1973–1974 | What If You Died Tomorrow? | Carmel Scott | Sydney Opera House, Canberra Theatre, Comedy Theatre, Melbourne | |
| 1974 | Macbeth | | Sydney Opera House | |
| 1980 | Children | Mother | Bondi Pavilion, Sydney | |
| 1980 | Inside the Island | Lillian Dawson | Nimrod Theatre, Sydney | |
| 1987 | Long Day's Journey into Night | Mary Cavan Tyrone | Marian St Theatre, Sydney | |
| 1989 | Knuckledusters – The Jewels of Edith Sitwell | | Canberra Theatre, Russell St Theatre, Melbourne | |
| 1989 | Shellcove Road | | Marian St Theatre, Sydney with Northside Theatre Company | |
| 1991 | The Hundred Year Ambush | | Newtown Studio Theatre, Sydney | |
| 1991 | Great Expectations – The Musical | | Seymour Centre, Sydney | |
| 1992 | The Winslow Boy | | Sydney Opera House, Suncorp Theatre, Brisbane | |
| 1993 | The Old Boy | | Ensemble Theatre, Sydney | |
| 1993 | Coriolanus | | Sydney Opera House with STC | |
| 1995 | Medee | A Woman | Sydney Opera House with Australian Opera | |
| 1998 | A Delicate Balance | | Sydney Opera House with STC | |
| 2000 | Mother’s Day | | Independent Theatre, Sydney with Ensemble Theatre | |
| 2000 | A Cheery Soul | Mrs. Lillie / Mr. Bleeker | Sydney Opera House with Belvoir / STC | |
| 2001 | Morning Sacrifice | | Wharf Theatre, Sydney with STC | |
| 2003 | La Serenissima: The Fascination of Venice | Poetry recitals | S.H. Ervin Gallery, Sydney | |
| 2003, 2008 | Poetry recitals | Reader | Gosford Regional Gallery | |
| 2005 | International Women's Day | Two monologues | Gosford Regional Gallery | |
| 2008 | The Makropoulos Secret | | Australian Opera | |
| 2012 | Christchurch Camerata Orchestra | Reader | Christchurch Camerata Orchestra | |

== Radio ==
| Year | Title | Role | Notes | Ref. |
|---|---|---|---|---|
| | The Mariners | | Macquarie Network | |
| 1940s–1950s | Cashmere Bouquet Show | | 2UE | |
| 1947–1948 | Lilian Dale Affair | Lilian Dale | | |
| 1947–1948 | The Devil's Duchess | | 2UW / 2KO | |
| 1947–1948 | Office Wife | Marcia | | |
| 1950 | I Hate Crime | | Episode: "The Case of the Montana Mauler" on 2UE | |
| 1950 | I Hate Crime | | Episode: "The Clue of the Scratched Brief-Case" on 2UE | |
| 1950s | Dinner at Antoine's | Odile St Amant | 2UW | |
| 1950s | Gabrielle | | 2UW / 5AD | |
| 1950s | My Heart's Desire | | 4IP | |
| 1950s | Romances of the Pacific | | | |
| 1950s | Radio Cab | | | |
| 1951 | Dossier on Dumetrius | Hedy Bergner | 2UE | |
| 1951 | A Woman Scorned | | 2UW | |
| 1951 | Paula Lehmann | | 2UE | |
| 1951–1960s | Hart of the Territory | Felicity Wayne | 2GB | |
| 1952 | One Way Street | | Macquarie Broadcasting Service & 2GB | |
| 1952 | The Night Was Our Friend | | The General Motors Hour on 3AW | |
| 1952 | Dutch with Dames | | 2UE | |
| 1953 | It Never Rains | | 4BH | |
| 1954 | Tudor Princess | Young Elizabeth | 2UW / 3KZ | |
| 1954 | Tudor Queen | Queen Elizabeth I | | |
| 1954 | For Love of a Woman | | 2UW | |
| 1954 | Reach for the Sky | | 2UE / 3DB | |
| 1955 | Fallen Angel | | | |
| c.1955 | Starlight Theatre Volume 1 | | | |
| 1955–1956 | The Clock | Leah / Enid / Cora / Dianna | Episode 6: "The One-Eyed Cat", Episode 14: "The Bank Vault", Episode 28: "Retribution", Episode 36: "The Dream Home", Episode 42: "Trouble at Key West" | |
| 1958 | The Alcestis | Alcestis | ABC Radio | |
| 1958 | The Ponyman | | 2GB | |
| 1959 | As You Like It | Rosalind | 2BL-NC-CN / 4QR | |
| 1960 | Passage of the Tangmar | Ilona Fedorov | | |
| 1960s | Give Me No Pity | Jane Worthington | | |
| 1960s–1970s | Dr Paul | Virginia Martin | 2UW | |
| c.1962 | The Scarlet Frontier | Isabelle | | |
| c.1963 | This Side of Innocence | Amalie Maxwell | | |
| 1970s | Clayton Place | Catherine Marlowe | 3AW | |
| 1970s | A Relative Affair | | | |
| 1970s | Strange Homecoming | | | |
| 1979 | The Drowned Phoenician Sailor | Laura | ABC Radio Sydney | |
| 1979 | Alladyce and the Holy Virago | Isobel | ABC Radio Sydney | |
| 1979 | A Wicked Pack of Cards | Laura | ABC Radio Sydney | |
| | Becket | Queen Eleanor | | |
| | Big City | | | |
| | The Knave of Hearts | Peggy Browning | | |
| | Romantic Stories | Amanda Gray | | |
| 1990 | Summer of the Aliens | | BBC Radio | |

== Filmography ==
=== Television ===
| Year | Title | Role | Type | Ref. |
|---|---|---|---|---|
| 1957 | A Phoenix too Frequent | Dynamene | TV movie | |
| 1958 | Sixty Point Bold | Maria Charvet | TV play | |
| 1960 | Macbeth | Lady Macbeth | TV movie | |
| 1961 | Delta | Hannah Thompson | 1 episode | |
| 1972 | The Survivor | | TV movie | |
| 1972 | Catwalk | Moya Sandford | 1 episode | |
| 1982 | Cop Shop | Sophia Caruso | 1 episode | |
| 1982–1983 | The Sullivans | Mary Sullivan | 45 episodes | |
| 1983 | All the Rivers Run | Aunt Hester | Miniseries, 3 episodes | |
| 1983 | Learned Friends | | | |
| 1984 | Man of Letters | Beth Serry | TV movie | |
| 1984 | Singles | Allison's mother | Miniseries, 5 episodes | |
| 1984 | Saturday Saturday | | | |
| 1985 | Five Mile Creek | Mrs Armstrong | 5 episodes | |
| 1985 | Special Squad | Minister | 1 episode | |
| 1985 | Emmett Stone | Muriel | TV movie | |
| 1985–1993 | A Country Practice | Heather Moss / Monika Schnelle | 4 episodes | |
| 1986 | Dancing Daze | | Miniseries | |
| 1987 | The Harp in the South | Sister Beatrix | 3 episodes | |
| 1988 | Rafferty's Rules | Vera Grey | 1 episode | |
| 1989 | E Street | Helen Kennedy | 8 episodes | |
| 1990 | Family and Friends | Antoinetta Rossi | | |
| 1993 | Police Rescue | Mrs Conway | Season 3, 1 episode | |
| 1994 | G.P. | Rose Browning | 1 episode | |
| 1998 | Wildside | Anna Weissman | 1 episode | |
| 1998; 2000 | All Saints | Caroline Edgewater / Judith Ashton | 2 episodes | |
| 1999 | Time and Tide | Irene | TV movie | |
| 2000 | The Lost World | Anna Summerlee | 1 episode | |
| 2001 | Flat Chat | | 1 episode | |
| 2002 | Farscape | Elack's Pilot (voice) | Season 4, 3 episodes | |

=== Film ===
| Year | Title | Role | Type | Ref. |
|---|---|---|---|---|
| 1983 | Buddies | Merle | Feature film | |
| 1985 | A Spy in the Family | | Feature film | |
| 2001 | The Long Wet | | Feature film | |

== Directorial and crew ==
| Year | Title | Role | Type | Ref. |
|---|---|---|---|---|
| 1947 | Lady Windermere's Fan | Costume Designer | Metropolitan Theatre Sydney | |
| 1948 | A Midsummer Night's Dream | Costume Designer | Metropolitan Theatre Sydney, Killara Soldiers Memorial Hall | |
| 2003 | Archibald Prize: The Play | Co-director | The Actor's Forum | |
| 2003 | Winners | Director | The Actor's Forum | |
| 2006 | Collected Stories | Director | | |
| 2006–2007 | The Actor's Forum | Director | The Actor's Forum | |
| 2007 | Lettice and Lovage | Director | | |
| 2008 | The Fortunates | | | |
| 2009 | Katandra Players | | Katandra Players | |
| 2010 | Wilde Woman | Director | | |
| | Stopover | | | |
| | Flaws in the Looking Glass | Director | | |
