= Shirley Butler =

Australian radio program

Shirley Butler is a 1953 Australian radio feature about the unsolved murder of Sydney woman Shirley Butler.

It was made for 2SM radio station, written and produced by Anthony Scott Veitch, commissioned by Tom Jacobs. Extensive research was done for the program which was made with the involvement of the police. The broadcast went for 16 minutes.

According to the Adelaide Mail the broadcasts "made radio and criminal investigation history."

According to the Sydney Sun "2SM's switchboard has been jammed with congratulatory calls on its dramatic Wednesday night broadcast seeking further information about the Christmas Eve murder of Shirley Butler at Waverton."

According to the Adelaide Mail "So far, the broadcast has not brought in the evidence which could lead the police to the killer, but in the estimation of the police authorities, it has opened up a brand new field of crime detection which may play a major part in criminal investigations in the future."

== Cast ==
- Alan Trevor as narrator
- Margaret Christiansen
- Marie Clarke
- Bruce Stewart
- Queenie Ashton
- David Eadie
- Laurel Mather
