= Mary Mackay (actor) =

Irish-Australian actress

Mary Mackay was an Irish-Australian actress. She was born in Ireland and worked at the Abbey Theatre, and in London. In the 1950s, she moved to Australia where she worked on stage, radio, television and film. She arrived in Australia with the company for Call Me Madam.

Mackay hosted a number of Australian television talk shows.

Mackay married a T. Carmichael. She was also an A.T.S. major during World War II.

== Select credits ==
- A Tongue of Silver (1959)
- The Slaughter of St Teresa's Day (1960)
- Quiet Night (1961)
- Funnel Web (1962)
- The Stranger (1964)
- Enough to Make a Pair of Sailor's Trousers (1966)
- Where Dead Men Lie (1971)
- Caddie (1976)
- The Alternative (1977)
- Harlequin (1980)
- Undercover (1984)
