= Firth Shephard =

Firth Shephard (27 April 1891 – 3 January 1949) was a British writer, theatre producer and presenter of plays.

== Life and career ==
Shephard was born in London, the son of Richard Shephard and his wife Elizabeth, nee Oliver). He married Constance Evans, formerly a concert entertainer.

Among the works written by Shepard are Parlez-vous Français? " (with Fred Karno), 1915; Hot and Cold, 1915; Extra Special, 1916; Oh, Julie (with Lee Branson), 1920; Faust on Toast (with Adrian Ross), 1921; Little Miss Puck, 1924; Dear Little Billie, 1925; Shephard's Pie, 1925; Lady Luck, 1927; As a manager, Shephard produced Dear Little Billie (with Laddie Cliff), Whispering Wires, 1927 and many revues. He entered into partnership with Leslie Henson in 1928, and together they produced Skin Deep, 1928, Her Past, 1929, Follow Through, A Warm Corner, 1929, It's a Boy, Oh, Daddy!1930, Counsel's Opinion, It's a Girl, 1931, The Love Pirate, Party, Night of the Garter, 1932, a revival of Lonsdale's On Approval, Nice Goings On, Ladies' Night, 1933, Indoor Fireworks, Half-a-Crown, Living Dangerously and Lucky Break, 1934. Among his best-running productions of the 1930s was Ian Hay's Housemaster, which ran for 662 performances.

In the early years of the Second World War, Shephard conceived the idea of sending a topical revue on tour, reusing the title Shephard's Pie. According to The Stage, that show launched Shephard on his career as a war-time man of the theatre. After that he achieved some long runs despite the difficulties and dangers of operating a London theatre in wartime. Examples included The Man Who Came To Dinner (708 performances), Junior Miss (518 performances) and Arsenic and Old Lace (1, 337 performances).

== Sources ==
- Gaye, Freda, ed. (1967). Who's Who in the Theatre (fourteenth ed.). London: Sir Isaac Pitman and Sons. OCLC 5997224.
- Parker, John, ed. (1939). Who's Who in the Theatre (ninth ed.). London: Sir Isaac Pitman and Sons. OCLC 473894893.
