= Rod Milgate =

Australian painter and playwright

Rodney Armour Milgate (30 June 1934 – 19 September 2014) was an Australian painter and playwright. He was a professor of the Visual Arts School of the (then) City Art Institute, University of NSW and newsreader (on the broadcast television Channel 7).

== Biography ==
Rodney Armour Milgate was born at Kyogle, New South Wales on 30 June 1934.

Milgate was considered one of Australia's most influential artists, especially during the 60s and 70s. His work is represented in major collections around the world and he had many solo exhibitions and awards for his work, including the Blake Prize for Religious Art three times. His play, A Refined Look at existence, first presented in February 1968, was described as "An ironic comedy drama which reworks Euripides' The Bacchae, set in a NSW country town. Daring in form, this was possibly the earliest play to capture the emotional turbulence that characterised the 1960s." In 1960, he married Australian actress Dinah Shearing and the couple had two sons. Milgate retired to the Central Coast, north of Sydney, where he died on Friday, 19 September 2014.

== Selected work ==
=== Awards ===
- 1964 John Fairfax Human Image Prize
- 1966 Blake Prize for Religious Art
- 1968 Harkness Fellowship (Commonwealth Fund, New York), two-year tenure
- 1970 D' Arcy Morris Memorial Prize
- 1972 Gold Coast Purchase Prize (jointly)
- 1975 Blake Prize for Religious Art
- 1977 Blake Prize for Religious Art (jointly with John Coburn)
- 1978 Six month Residency, Owen Tooth Memorial Cottage, The Karolyi Foundation, Vence, France

Six month Residency, Studio Cite Internationale des Arts, Paris, France

- 1986 Gosford City Art Award – New World
- 1987 Sydney Morning Herald Heritage Art Award
- 1991 Mosman Art Award
- 1993 Outstanding Achievement in Poetry (Editor's Choice), National Library of Poetry, Maryland, USA
- 1993 CoFA, University of New South Wales, Faculty Research Grant
- 1995 Positive Images Prize, Pittwater Council, NSW – 'Incident at Avalon Beach', a poem (writing award)
- 1996 Three months residency, University of NSW Studio, Cite Internationale des Arts, Paris, France

=== Selected solo exhibitions ===
- 1962 Macquarie Galleries, Sydney
- 1963 South Yarra Galleries, Melbourne

Macquarie Galleries, Sydney

- 1965 Macquarie Galleries, Sydney

South Yarra Galleries, Melbourne
Johnstone Galleries, Brisbane
Macquarie Galleries, Canberra

- 1966 Commonwealth Institute Galleries (by invitation), Whitechapel, London

Macquarie Galleries, Sydney
Macquarie Galleries, Canberra

- 1967 Johnstone Galleries, Brisbane

Von Bertouch Galleries, Newcastle, NSW
Macquarie Galleries, Sydney

- 1969 Macquarie Galleries, Sydney
- 1970 Johnstone Galleries, Brisbane

Macquarie Galleries, Canberra

- 1971 Macquarie Galleries, Sydney
- 1972 Johnstone Galleries, Brisbane

South Yarra Galleries, Melbourne

- 1973 Macquarie Galleries, Sydney

Macquarie Galleries, Canberra

- 1974 Macquarie Galleries, Sydney
- 1976 Macquarie Galleries, Sydney
- 1977 Macquarie Galleries, Canberra
- 1980 Macquarie Galleries, Sydney

St James Room, David Jones, Sydney
Touring exhibition, Phillip Bacon Galleries, Brisbane, and St Johns Cathedral, Brisbane
Solander Gallery, Canberra

- 1982 Painters Gallery, Sydney
- 1983 Barry Stern Exhibiting Gallery, Sydney
- 1989 Bonython-Meadmore Gallery, Sydney
- 1989 Long Gallery, Wollongong University, NSW (public exhibition of PhD presentation)
- 1991 David Jones Art Gallery, Sydney
- 1991–92 Fourteen Stations of the Cross (17 major oil paintings accompanied by poems read and recorded by Dinah Shearing and Ron Haddrick), toured Orange Regional Art Gallery,

NSW; Dubbo Regional Art Gallery,
NSW; Noosa Art Gallery, Queensland
A Search for Meaning – Recent Paintings, Blaxland Galleries, Sydney
Poetics in the Paintings of Rod
Milgate, Manly Art Gallery Survey Exhibition, Sydney

- 1994 Points of View, Ivan Dougherty Gallery, College of Fine Arts, University of New South Wales
- 1995 The Art of Rod Milgate, Manly Art Gallery and Museum
- 1996 Wagner Galleries, Sydney
- 1998 Artarmon Galleries, Sydney
- 2002 Journey into self, Gosford Regional Art Gallery, NSW
- 2012 Allograph, Gosford Regional Art Gallery, NSW

=== Productions and writings ===
- 1966 A Refined Look at Existence (three-act stage play), produced at Jane Street Theatre, University of New South Wales, Kensington, Sydney by Robin Lovejoy

Art composition: a contemporary view (book) Pub. Angus and Robertson, Sydney
"The nature of creativity". Commissioned article for October Hemisphere magazine. Pub. Commonwealth Office of education

- 1968 At Least You Get Something Out of That, play commissioned by New South Wales Drama Foundation, produced at Old Tote Theatre Season of Australian plays (including revival of A Refined Look at Existence)
- 1977 Grass Up to Your Ears and Buckets with Holes in Them (two stage plays)
- 1978 Incident at Novala Beach (novel)
- 1979 A Golden Pathway Through Europe selected for workshop production presentation at the Australian National Playwrights Conference, Australian National University, Canberra

Triage or the Fortunates (stage play) 'First Hearing', 'Australian Letters', 'Poet's Tongue' and 'Quality Street' broadcast on ABC National Radio
Pictures at an exhibition (book of poetry) Pub. Elizabethan Press, Sydney

- 1980 A Golden Pathway Through Europe produced at Ensemble Theatre, Milsons Point, Sydney

Favourites (stage play)

- 1981 Intruders and Destiny's Mill (two stage plays)

Grass Up to Your Ears selected for reading at the Australian National Playwrights Conference, Australian National University, Canberra

- 1982 The Story of Larry Foley (film script)
- 1983 'Work in Progress', ABC telefilm, The Creative Eye, series on Australian artists

Destiny's Mill selected for workshop production presentation at National Playwrights' Conference, Australian National University, Canberra

- 1984 Triage or the Fortunates adapted for radio and accepted for production ABC Radio, Sydney

Wrote Archibald Prize (stage play)

- 1985 Anniversary Waltz (stage play) Workshop reading of Intruders at Hunter Valley Theatre Company, Newcastle, NSW
- 1991 Workshop reading of Anniversary Waltz, Iron €ove Theatre, Sydney
- 1992 The Search for Meaning – Fourteen Stations of the Cross subject of monograph for ABC National Radio, presented by Caroline Jones, produced by Stephen Godley; poems recorded by Ron Haddrick and Dinah Shearing, Catholic Broadcasting Services, Sydney, * * 1992
- 1993 Incident at Novala Beach Published by College of Fine Arts, NSW University.

The coming of dawn, An anthology Pub. The National Library of Poetry, Owing Mills, Maryland USA
'The Sound of Poetry', cassette recording, one of ten international poems selected and recorded by National Library of Poetry, Owing Mills MD, Maryland, USA

- 1996 Archibald Prize (stage play), Domain Theatre, Art Gallery of New South Wales; director Aarne Neeme

== Acting appearances ==
- The Slaughter of St Teresa's Day (1960) (TV movie)
