= Man of Letters (film) =

- Directed by: Chris Thomson
- Written by: Alma De Groen
- Based on: novel by Glen Tomasetti
- Produced by: Chris Thomson
- Starring: Warren Mitchell; Dinah Shearing
- Production company: ABC
- Release date: 5 August 1984
- Running time: 83 minutes
- Country: Australia
- Language: English

Man of Letters is a 1984 television film about a womanising academic. It was the second in a collection of six films in the series Sunday Australian Movies and stars Warren Mitchell as Sir Dorton Serry.

== Cast ==
- Warren Mitchell as Sir Dorton Serry
- Dinah Shearing as Beth Serry
- Carol Raye as Ursula Penhindle
- Arna-Maria Winchester as Doona Douglas
- Simon Burvill-Holmes as George Highwire
- Pat Bishop as Ann Turtle
- Genevieve Mooy as Con
- Steve Jacobs as Hall
- Ailsa Piper as Winnie Harmstrung

== Reception ==
Matthew Bolton in the Age says "Mitchell plays his part just short of excessively. He controls Sir Dorton's madness and manages to project a picture of an acute, rambling, pathetic lunatic. It's not a pretty sight even though Mitchell does allow for some comic aspects in the breakdown." Robyn Ferrell of the Sydney Morning Herald says "The novel, which is delightful, unfortunately appears to falter in drawing its moral and the film does not correct this, leaving the ending confused. Having created an egotistical monster as the main character, the novel falls victim to his charm. The film exacerbates this by placing Warren Mitchell in the part, at which he excels." In The Sydney Morning Herald Richard Coleman said it was an improvement on the first film of the series "because, unlike last week, the story had something in it for the actors." Dennis Pryor in the Age says "The film does not hang together and I kept wondering why I did not turn it off. Yet I kept watching because of some brilliant scenes." John O'Hara writes in Cinema Papers "The story-line develops slowly, relying on a voice-over narration to give an ironic, or at least self-deprecating, commentary from the professor. Sequences are connected by often unnecessary establishing shots: in the car, at airports, hotel lobbies, office corridors. But the film falls down by cheapening its material, trying to score off everything. Cheap shots are passed off as wit, and literally everything is up for grabs."
