= Fourth Liberty Loans: I Had A Son =

- Directed by: Ken G. Hall
- Written by: Robert MacKinnon
- Produced by: Ken G. Hall
- Starring: John Tate
- Cinematography: Bert Nicholas
- Edited by: William Shepherd
- Production company: Cinesound Productions
- Distributed by: Columbia
- Release date: 1943
- Running time: 9 minutes
- Country: Australia
- Language: English

Fourth Liberty Loans: I Had A Son is a short film from Ken G. Hall made for propaganda purposes in World War Two.

It was part of the Fourth Liberty Loans campaign by the Australian government.

The film was criticised in some sectors.

== Plot ==
A father mourns the loss of his fighter pilot son, who crashes in New Guinea during World War II and survives, then sacrifices his life to save other Australian soldiers from a Japanese ambush.

== Cast ==
- John Tate
- George Randall
