= Frank Waters (actor) =

Australian actor

Frank Waters (1915–1972) was an Australian actor. He was from Adelaide and worked extensively in Australian theatre, radio, TV and film.

He was spotted by Anthony Quayle when the latter was touring Australia; Quayle offered Waters a scholarship at Stratford. He was there for eight months.

== Select credits ==
- Always Another Dawn (1948)
- The Slaughter of St Teresa's Day (1960)
- The Grey Nurse Said Nothing (1960)
- Swamp Creatures (1960)
- Thunder on Sycamore Street (1960)
- The Outcasts (1961)
