= Peter Kenna =

Australian playwright, radio actor and screenwriter

Peter Joseph Kenna
- Born: 18 March 1930; Balmain, New South Wales
- Died: 29 November 1987 (aged 57); Sydney, Australia
- Occupations: playwright, film and screenwriter

Peter Joseph Kenna (18 March 1930 – 29 November 1987) was an Australian playwright, radio actor and screenwriter. He has been called "a quasi-legendary figure in Australian theatre, never quite fashionable, but never quite forgotten either."

== Biography ==
=== Early life ===
Born in Balmain, New South Wales, Kenna left school at fourteen and took up various jobs. He started working in the theatre by participating in concert parties at the camps in Sydney during World War II.

=== Career ===
His first play was written when he was 21.

In 1959. the play The Slaughter of St Teresa's Day was produced in Sydney, based on the life of Tilly Devine. The play was turned into a television drama in 1960.

He went to London in the early 1960s.

He wrote the screenplay for the film The Good Wife (also known as The Umbrella Woman) produced in 1987, a World War II drama about a man, his wife and his brother. The film starred Bryan Brown, Rachel Ward and Sam Neill. Rachel Ward won the Tokyo International Film Festival award for best actress for the film, and Jennie Tate the Australian Film Institute award for Best Achievement in Costume Design.

=== Death ===
He died in Sydney on 29 November 1987 after a long illness.

== Works ==
=== Plays ===
- The Slaughter of St Teresa's Day (1959 - published 1972, Currency Press)
- Talk to the Moon (1963 - published 1977, Currency Press)
- Listen Closely (1972 - published 1977, Currency Press)
- Muriel's Virtues (1966)
- Animal Grab
- An Eager Hope
- The Fair Sister
- The Landladies
- A Hard God (1974, Currency Press)
- Mates (1977, Currency Press)
- Trespassers Will Be Prosecuted (1977, Currency Press)
- Furtive Love (1980, Currency Press)

=== Television writing ===
- The Slaughter of St Theresa's Day (1960) (adapted for TV)
- Dust or Polish (1972) (TV, adaptation of a novel by Norman Lindsay)
- The Emigrants (1976) (BBC TV)
- A Hard God (1981) (adapted for TV)

=== Radio ===
- Julie Was

=== Film ===
- The Good Wife (1987)
