= Minerva Theatre, Sydney =

Australian performance venue

Minerva Theatre
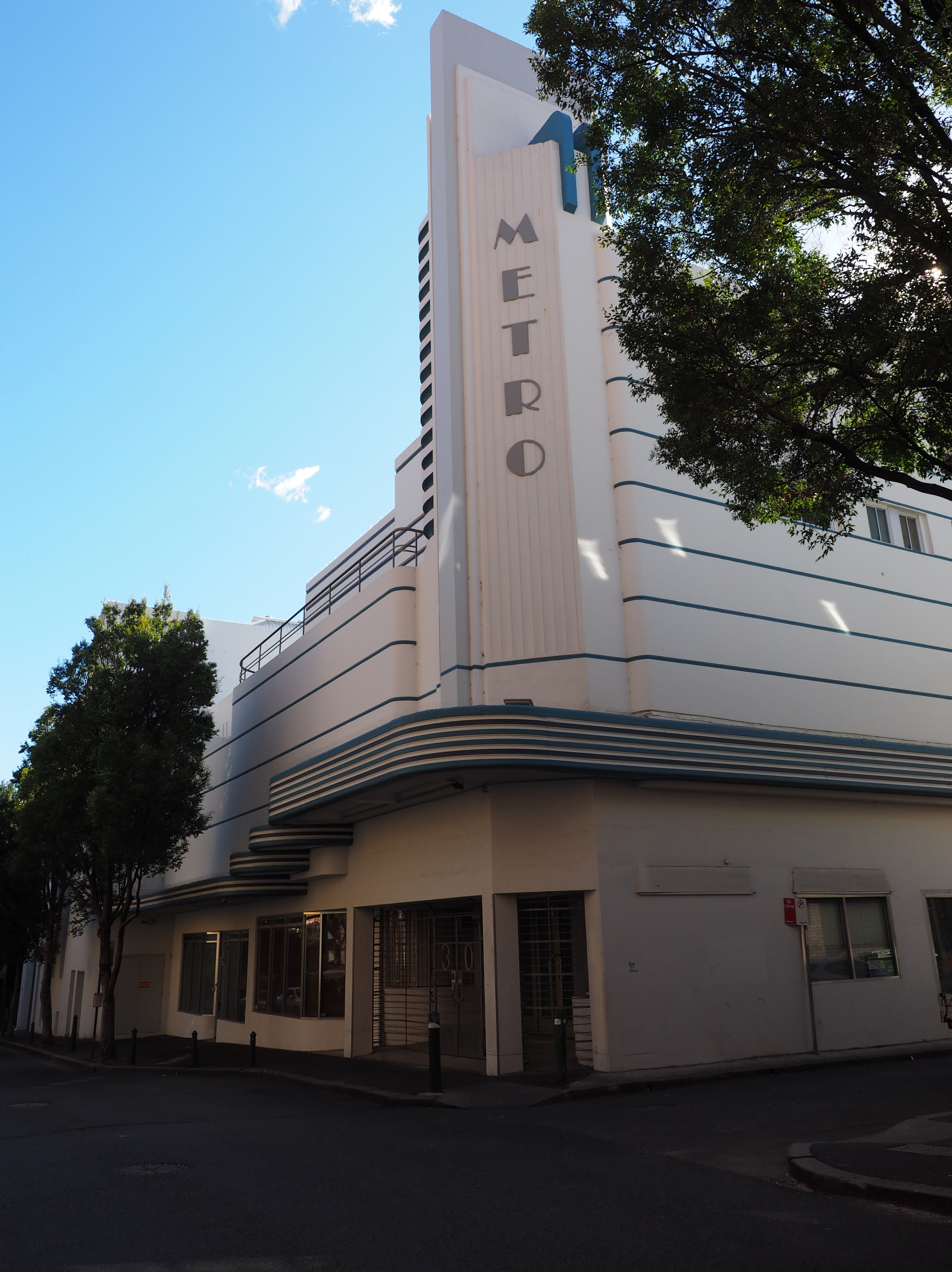
- The Minerva Theatre building in 2019
- Interactive map of Minerva Theatre
- Address: Orwell Street, Kings Cross, Sydney; Kings Cross, New South Wales; Australia
- Coordinates: 33°52′19″S 151°13′28″E
- Owner: Sacred Firebird

Construction
- Opened: 1939 as a live theatre venue

The Minerva Theatre was a theatre located in Orwell Street in Kings Cross, Sydney. Originally a live venue, it was converted to the Metro Cinema in 1950, before returning to live shows in 1969. It ceased operating as a theatre in 1979. From 2019 onwards, there were community efforts to ensure the building would continue operating as a theatre.

== History ==
In 1937, David N Martin, a theatrical publicity and advertising agent, formed a new theatre company named Minerva Centre Ltd to erect two live theatres on opposite sides of Macleay Street, Potts Point. An early design for the Orwell Street site by Bruce Dellit was rejected in favour of a more modest design by cinema specialists Crick & Furse, which opened on 18 May 1939 with a production of Robert Sherwood's Idiot's Delight. The site for the other proposed theatre site was acquired by the City of Sydney and is now the Fitzroy Gardens. The site in front of the Minerva facing Macleay Street was developed as the Minerva Cafe and Nightclub, with a vaulted roof.

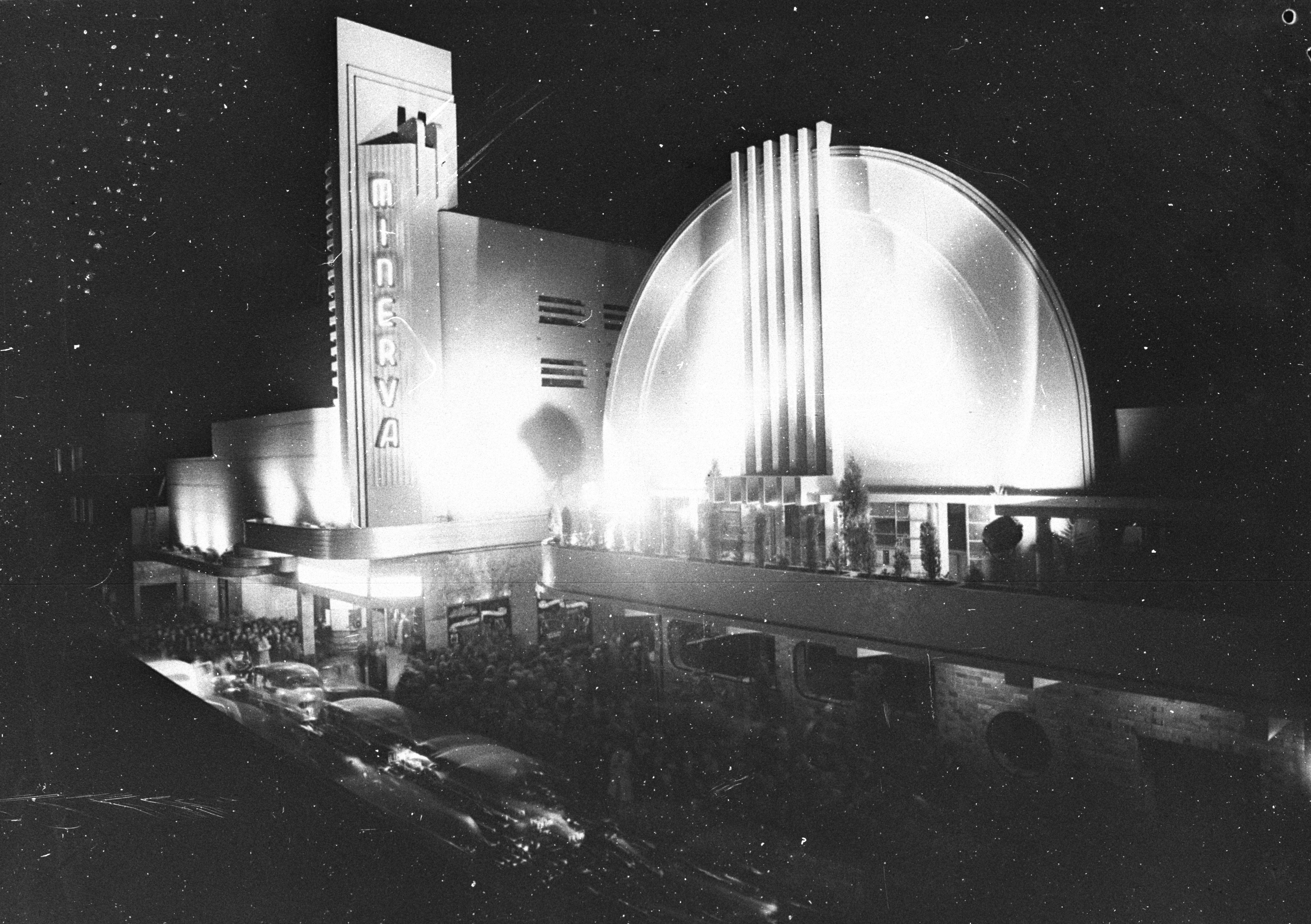
Opening night, Minerva Theatre, 18 May 1939

In May 1941 it was leased by Whitehall Theatrical Productions, an independent production company. They remained in the venue for almost a decade, staging their last show there in April 1950.

Metro-Goldwyn-Mayer purchased the building in 1950 and converted to a movie theatre, renaming it the Metro Cinema. Harry M. Miller returned the venue to live theatre in 1969 with a production of the musical Hair.

In 1979 the building was converted to a market. In the early 1980s, it became offices for the Kennedy Miller film production company.

In 2019, Kennedy Miller sold the building to the Abacus Property Group, amidst hopes by members of the local community that it could become a community centre and theatre. Heritage listed by the City of Sydney including the interior, it was nominated by them to the NSW Heritage Register in 2019. The Metro-Minerva Theatre Action Group (MTAG) was formed in 2019 to lobby and campaign for the reinstatement of the Minerva to a fully functioning theatre. In 2021, property developer Central Element purchased the building from Abacus.

On 9 November 2023, the City of Sydney approved plans for the Metro-Minerva building to become a hotel/nightclub. The MTAG website was then updated with the below message:

We are devastated at this news, and this heritage gem will be lost forever after this irrevocable alteration for a business plan that stacks up or has longevity... Thank you for your support over the years. Sadly, despite much pressure for local residents, due to a system stacked against us and the inertia of the NSW arts minister, we have lost.

Central Element put the building on the market in January 2024 and it was sold to Gretel Packer's company Sacred Firebird for $26 million in July 2024.

== Design ==
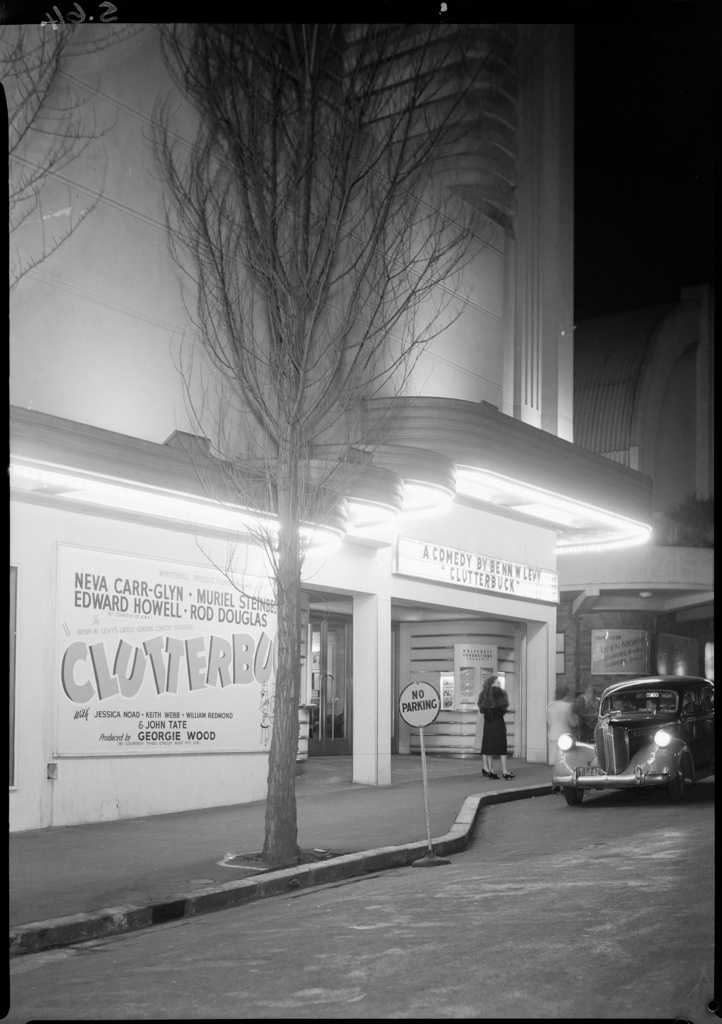
Minerva Theatre, June 1947

The Art Deco theatre was designed for comfort, with lounge seating and only 1000 seats. The stage had a proscenium design and there were two small side stages.

The City of Sydney heritage citation states that :

"The Metro Theatre, although altered, is an exceptional example and represents the apotheosis of the Art Deco Streamline Moderne style in New South Wales. The Metro Theatre has an expertly controlled geometric massing of the exterior form, exhibiting all the trademarks of the Streamline Moderne style. Strongly influenced by Expressionism, the tower is one of the most strikingly successful Streamline Moderne structures ever realised in New South Wales. Although altered internally, the shell of the auditorium remains. Strongly influenced by Expressionism, the auditorium is one of the most striking theatre interiors ever realised in New South Wales."
