= Penguin Award =

Australian broadcasting award

The Penguin Award was an annual award given for excellence in broadcasting by the Television Society of Australia, whose members included managers of the metropolitan stations, chief engineers of GTV-9 and HSV-7, the director of RMIT radio school, and members of the Broadcasting Control Board. The society was formed in 1954. The society gave out their first awards in 1959. In 1960, the society held a competition to design an award trophy, which was won by Desmond White, an artist and designer at the Australian Broadcasting Corporation. White's winning design was nicknamed the "Penguin", as the trophy depicts an ear listening to a television tube, but strongly resembles a penguin. The awards were initially given for specific aspects of "live" television shows, documentaries, and commercials, with the ceremonies held in November.

== Past winners ==
=== 1968 ===
Presented on 10 November 1968.

- Best Lead Actor in a Drama Series – Leonard Teale, Homicide, Channel 7
- Best Supporting Actor in a Drama Series – Stewart Ginn, My Name's McGooley, Channel 7
- Best Direction of a Drama Series – Alex Emmanuel, Homicide, Channel 7
- Best Lead Talent in a Variety Show – Graham Kennedy
- Best Documentary – For Better or Worse, ABC

=== 1970 ===
- Special Award: Outstanding Achievement in Television, 1969 Moon Telecasts – Dept of Supply, Australian Government (coordinating agency in Australia for NASA)

=== 1972 ===
- Leading Quizmaster – Tony Barber, The Great Temptation, Channel 7
- Leading Drama Talent – TIE – James Laurenson, Boney and Michael Pate, Matlock Police, Network 10
- Leading National Newsreader – Brian Naylor
- Commonwealth Film Development Corporation $3000 TV Drama Prize – Division 4: Episode 'The Return of John Kelso'
- Special Commendation – Over There. Episode 'A Long Way From The Junction', ABC
- Shell $2000 Documentary Award – A Big Country. Episode 'The Whalers', ABC
- Best Supporting Actor in a Television Series – Frank Taylor, Division 4
- Leading Variety Talent – Mary Jane Boyd – Matt Flinders Show, ABC
- Leading Reporter Current Affairs – Richard Carleton, This Day Tonight, ABC
- Best Variety Series – The Matt Flinders Show, ABC
- Best Current Affairs Program – A Current Affair, Network 9
- The Society's Trophy – Mr C.L. Faudell. Founder & Past President of the TV Society of Australia

=== 1973 ===
Presented in a joint function with the Australian Film Institute Awards in Melbourne on 2 December 1973.

- Best Drama Series – Seven Little Australians, ABC
- Best Children's Show – Seven Little Australians, ABC
- Best Actor – Leonard Teale – Seven Little Australians, ABC
- Best Supporting Actress – Ruth Cracknell – Seven Little Australians, ABC
- Best Variety Series – Showcase '73
- Best Single Program – Malaysia....Where are all the Children going?, Network 10
- Best Current Affairs Show – A Current Affair, Network 9
- Best Variety Entertainer – Jill Perryman, Perryman on Parade, ABC
- Best Newsreader – Geoff Raymond, ABC
- Best Current Affairs Presentation – Mike Willesee, A Current Affair
- Best Drama Script – Frank Hardy, Boney Episode: Boney Meets the Daybreak Killer

=== 1974 ===
Presented at the New Hilton Hotel in Melbourne on 8 December 1974.

- Best Actress – Helen Morse – Marion
- Best Actor – Frank Wilson – And the Big Men Fly
- Best Drama Script – Cliff Green, Marion
- ? – David Zweck, Marion
- ? – Oscar Whitbread, Marion
- Best Drama Series – Billy and Percy – Oscar Whitbread and John Power
- Best Entertainer – Ernie Sigley

=== 1975 ===
- Best Actor – John Meillon, The Fourth Wish, ABC
- Best Actress – Olivia Hamnett, Rush, ABC
- Best Variety Entertainer – Garry McDonald
- Best Newsreader/Reporter – Geoff Raymond, ABC
- Best Current Affairs Interviewer – Richard Carleton, ABC
- Best Script – Michael Craig, The Fourth Wish, ABC
- Best Producer/Director – Oscar Whitbread, Rush, ABC
- Best Documentary – Wildlife in Papua New Guinea and Nation Emerging
- Best Adult Drama – They Don't Clap Losers
- Best Original Theme Music – Rush, ABC

=== 1976 ===
- Best Actor – John Waters for Rush (ABC)
- Best Actress – Penne Hackforth-Jones for Tandarra
- Best Supporting Actor – George Mallaby for Power Without Glory (ABC)
- Best Supporting Actress – Heather Canning for Power Without Glory (ABC)
- Best Drama Series – Power Without Glory (ABC)
- Best Variety Series – The Don Lane Show (Channel 9)
- Best Variety Special – Neil Diamond – Thank You Australia Concert (9 Network)
- Best Children's Program – Solo One (Crawford Productions)
- Best Musical – The Fool on the Hill (ABC)
- Best Current Affairs Interviewer – Mike Walsh
- Best Variety Entertainer – Don Lane
- Best Original Music – Mike Brady for Solo One
- Best Current Affairs Program – Four Corners (ABC)
- Best Documentary – A Big Country (ABC)

=== 1977 ===
- Best Actor – Peter Adams, The Alternative
- Best Actress – Wendy Hughes, The Alternative
- Best Supporting Actor – Alwyn Kurts, The Alternative
- Best Supporting Actress – Arianthe Galani, Pig in a Poke, ABC
- Australian Film Commission $3000 Prize in Adult Drama – The Alternative
- Australian Film Commission Open Drama – Pig in a Poke, ABC
- Best Drama Script – Pig in a Poke, ABC
- Best Individual Production Achievement – Power Without Glory, ABC
- Best Drama Director – Carl Schultz, The Tichborne Affair, ABC
- Best Variety Musical Entertainer – Don Lane
- Best Newsreader – Brian Naylor
- Best Documentary Script – Fred "Cul" Cullen, Australians at War, Network 10
- Best Drama Production One Shot – The Tichborne Affair, ABC
- Best Variety Musical Program Series – The Don Lane Show, Network 9
- Best Variety Musical Program Special – Sammy Davis Jr in Australia, Channel 7
- Best Current Affairs – Four Corners
- Best Documentary – In the Wild with Harry Butler
- Best Children's Program – Fat Cat & Friends
- Best Outside Broadcast – Centenary Test Cricket Match, ABC
- Best Imported Program – The Duchess of Duke Street

=== 1979 ===
- Best Documentary – A Big Country, ABC
- The Shell Prize for Best News Story – The Heathcote Fires, Channel 9
- Best Comedy Program – Neutral Ground, ABC
- Best Variety Series – The Don Lane Show, Channel 9
- Best Adult Drama – Bit Part, ABC
- Best Children's Drama – Top Mates, ABC
- Best Children's Program – Shirl's Neighbourhood, Channel 7
- Best Current Affairs Show – Countrywide, ABC
- Best Sustained Performance by an Actor in a Series – Peter Adams, Cop Shop
- Best Sustained Performance by an Actress in a Series – Carol Burns, Prisoner
- Best Single Performance by an Actress – Jill Perryman, Palace of Dreams, ABC
- Best Entertainer – Don Lane, Channel 9
- Best New Talent – Liddy Clark, Ride on Stranger, ABC
- Best Television Play Direction – Peter Weir, The Plumber, Channel 9
- The $1000 Adult Drama Prize – The Summer of the 17th Doll, Channel 7
- Best Set Design – Against the Wind, Channel 7
- Best Musical Score – Against the Wind, Channel 7
- Best Camera Work – Against the Wind, Channel 7
- The Colin Bednall Award for Outstanding Contribution – Ian Fairweather

=== 1980 ===
- Best Single Performance by an Actor – John Hargreaves, The Banana Bender, ABC
- Best Sustained Performance by an Actor in a Series – Brian James, Skyways, Channel 7
- Best Single Performance by an Actress – Bunny Brooke, Rock Pool, ABC
- Best Sustained Performance by an Actress in a Series – Vivean Gray, The Sullivans, Channel 9
- Best TV Play or TV Movie Direction – Kevin James Dobson, Young Ramsay
- Best Current Affairs Program – 60 Minutes, Channel 9
- Best Documentary – Do Not Pass Go

=== 1982 ===
- Best Drama Series – A Town Like Alice, Channel 7
- Best Light Entertainment Series – Parkinson in Australia, Network 10
- Best Light Entertainment Program – Women's Weekly Fashion Awards
- Best Musical Program – The Don Lane Show, Channel 9
- Best Children's Light Entertainment – The Curiosity Show
- Best Current Affairs – Nationwide, ABC
- Best Sporting Telecast – 1981 VFL Grand Final
- Best Sustained Performance by an Actor in a Series – Bryan Brown, A Town Like Alice, Channel 7
- Best Sustained Performance by an Actress in a Series – Rowena Wallace, Sons & Daughters
- Best Light Entertainment Personality – Ian Turpie, The New Price is Right
- Best Newsreader – Jim Waley, Channel 9
- Best Children's TV Personality – Humphrey B. Bear
- Best TV Play or TV Movie Direction – Di Drew, 1915, ABC
- Best Drama Script – Out of Line, ABC
- Best Drama Series Script – Peter Yeldham, 1915, ABC
- Best Musical Score – Shirl's Neighbourhood, Channel 7
- Best Costume Design – Jim Murray, 1915, ABC
- Best Set Design & Best Editing – The Women's Weekly Fashion Awards

=== 1983 ===
- Best Drama Program – The Dean Case, ABC
- Best Limited-Mini Series Drama Program – The Dismissal, Channel 10
- Best Drama Serial – Carson's Law, Channel 10
- Best Children's Drama – Kicking Around
- Best Musical-Variety Series – The Daryl Somers Show, Channel 9
- Best Light Entertainment Non-Musical Series – Sale of the Century, Channel 9
- Best Variety Program – Sydney Entertainment Centre Opening, Channel 9
- Best Current Affairs – Focus
- Best News Program – Eye Witness News, Channel 10
- Best News Story – The Azaria Chamberlain Case, Channel 10
- Best Documentary – Birdmen of Kilimanjaro, Channel 10
- Best Sports Telecast – The Commonwealth Games, ABC
- Best Single Performance by an Actor in a Limited Miniseries – Bill Hunter, The Dismissal, Channel 10
- Best Single Performance by an Actor in a Series – William Zappa, Women of the Sun
- Best Sustained Performance by an Actor in a Serial/Series – Kevin Miles, Carson's Law, Channel 10
- Best Single Performance by an Actress in a Series – Mawuyul Yanthaluwuy, Women of the Sun
- Best Single Performance by an Actress in a Serial – Sally McKenzie, Cop Shop, Channel 7
- Best Sustained Performance by an Actress in a Serial/Series – Rowena Wallace, Sons & Daughters, Channel 7
- Best Light Entertainment Personality – Bert Newton, The Don Lane Show, Channel 9
- Best Newsreader – David Johnston, Channel 10
- Best TV Play or TV Movie Direction – George Miller, The Dismissal, Channel 10
- Best Drama Series Script – Sonia Borg & Hyllus Maris, Women of the Sun
- Best Drama Serial Script – Terry Stapleton, Carson's Law, Channel 10
- Best Lighting & Best Set Design – Carson's Law, Channel 10

=== 1984 ===
- Best Variety Program – Wak's Works, Channel 7 Brisbane

=== 1985 ===
- Best Miniseries Drama Program – All the Rivers Run (Channel 7)
- Best Light Entertainment Production – Australia You're Standing In It (ABC)
- Best Single Performance by an Actor in a Serial – Frank Gallacher for A Country Practice (Channel 7)
- Best Single Performance by an Actor in a Miniseries – Jack Thompson for Waterfront (Channel 10)
- Best Single Performance by an Actress in a Miniseries – Greta Scacchi for Waterfront (Channel 10)
- Best Performance by an Actor in a Miniseries – Henri Szeps for Palace of Dreams (ABC)
- Best Single Drama Performance by an Actor – Warren Mitchell for Man of Letters
- Best Single Performance by a Supporting Actress – Dinah Shearing for Man of Letters
- Best Performance by an Actress in a Supporting Role in a Miniseries – Kris McQuade, Palace of Dreams
- Best Sustained Performance by an Actress in a Series – Lorraine Bayly for Carson's Law (Channel 10)
- Best Light Entertainment Personality – Ian Turpie for The New Price is Right (Channel 7)
- Best Newsreaders – David Johnson and Jo Pearson, Eyewitness News (Channel 10)
- Best Current Affairs Personality – Jim Waley for Sunday (Channel 9)
- Best Light Entertainment Variety Series – Paul Hogan's England (Channel 9)
- Best Current Affairs – Sunday (Channel 9)
- Best Musical Score or Song – Bruce Rowland for All the Rivers Run (Channel 7)
- Best Children's Affairs Personality – Mr. Squiggle
- Best TV Play or Telemovie Direction – Michael Jenkins for Scales of Justice (ABC)
- Critics Award for Excellence in TV Program Production – Sunday (Channel 9)
- Colin Bednall Award for Excellence – Bobby Limb
- Special Award for Excellence in 28 Years in the Industry – Alf Potter

=== 1986 ===
- Best Drama Serial – Prisoner (Channel 10)
- Best Miniseries – The Dunera Boys (Channel 10)
- Best Situation Comedy – Mother and Son (ABC)
- Best One-off Drama – The Perfectionist (Channel 10)
- Best Sustained Performance by an Actor in a Principal/Supporting Role in a Series/Serial – Mark Little for The Flying Doctors (Network Nine)
- Best Performance by a Supporting Actor in a One-off Drama – Simon Chilvers for The Dunera Boys (Channel 10)
- Best Performance by an Actor in a Principal Role in a One-off Drama – Shane Connor for Emerging (ABC)
- Best Performance by an Actor in a Series – Max Cullen for The Flying Doctors
- Best Performance by an Actress in a Principal Role in a One-off Drama – Dasha Blahova for Displaced Persons (ABC)
- Best Performance by an Actress in a Series – Glenda Linscott for Prisoner (Network Ten)
- Best Sustained Performance by an Actress in a Series – Ruth Cracknell for Mother and Son (ABC)
- Best Performance by a Supporting Actress in a One-off Drama – Julia Blake for The Dunera Boys (Channel Ten)
- Best Miniseries Script – Ben Lewin for The Dunera Boys (Channel Ten)
- Best News Program – Eyewitness News – Russell Street Bombing
- Best Current Affairs – Sunday (Network Nine)
- Best Newsreader – Brian Naylor
- Best Documentary – Coup d'État (ABC)
- Best Sporting Telecast – 1985 Australian Grand Prix (Network Nine)
- Critics Award – Four Corners (ABC)
- Best Children's Drama – Top Kids (ATV10)
- Colin Bednall Award for Lifetime Achievement – Jim Fisher, Chief engineer of HSV7

=== 1987 ===
- Best One-off Drama/Miniseries – Vietnam (Network Ten)
- Best Drama Series or Serial – Rafferty's Rules (Channel Seven)
- Best Light Entertainment Program – Hey Hey It's Saturday (Channel Nine)
- Best One-off Variety Program – Elton John – Tour De Force (ABC)
- Best Current Affairs Program – Four Corners: "Dead Heart" (ABC)
- Best News Program – "Clifton Hill Massacre" (HSV-7)
- Best Television Documentary – Suzi's Story (Network Ten)
- Best Sporting Telecast – 1987 Australian Grand Prix (Network Nine)
- Best Performance By a Male Actor in a Principal Role in a One-off Drama – Drew Forsythe for Whose Baby? (Channel Seven)
- Best Performance By a Female Actor in a Principal Role in a One-off Drama – Anne Phelan for The Harp in the South (Network Ten)
- Best Performance By a Female Actor in a Supporting Role in a One-off Drama – Lisa Crittenden for Whose Baby? (Channel Seven)
- Best Performance By a Male Actor in a Series/Serial – Gerard Kennedy for The Flying Doctors (Network Nine)
- Best Performance By an Actress in a Series/Serial – Anne Charleston for Neighbours (Network Ten)
- Best Sustained Performance By an Actress in a Series – Anne Haddy for Neighbours (Network Ten)
- Best Light Entertainment Personality – Max Gillies (ABC)
- Best News Presenter – Brian Naylor (Network Nine)
- Best Current Affairs Presenter – Andrew Olle for Four Corners (ABC)
- Best Weather Presenter – Rob Gell – (Network Ten)
- Best Sports Presenter – Sandy Roberts – (Channel Seven)
- Best Educational Programme – Curriculum by Design – Producer: T. Guthridge

=== 1988 ===
- Best Miniseries – The Shiralee (Channel Seven)
- Best Drama Series – Rafferty's Rules (Channel Seven)
- Best Actor in a Series – Peter Carroll for Rafferty's Rules
- Best Scriptwriter, Drama Series – Michael Cove for Rafferty's Rules
- Best Children's Drama – Peter and Pompey
- Best Scriptwriter for One-off Drama – John Misto for Peter and Pompey
- Best Children's Program – Kaboodle
- Best Juvenile Actor – Damien Walters for Captain Johnno
- Best Light Entertainment Program – Hey Hey It's Saturday
- Best Special Event – John Farnham, Age of Reason Live at the Expo Concert
- Best Comedy – The Comedy Company (Channel Ten)
- Best News Program – National Nine News
- Best Current Affairs – Page One (Channel Ten)
- Best Sports Telecast – Australian Open tennis final (Channel Seven)
- Best Documentary – Out of Sight, Out of Mind
- Best Actor in a One-off Drama – Steve Bisley for The Clean Machine (Channel Ten)
- Best Actress in a One-off Drama – Anne Phelan for Poor Man's Orange (Channel Ten)
- Best Actress in a Serial – Lenore Smith for The Flying Doctors (Channel Nine)
- Best Male Presenter – Jim Waley for Sunday
- Best Female Presenter – Helen Wellings for The Investigators
- Special Award for Documentary – Nature of Australia: A Portrait of the Island Continent: A Separate Creation
- Special Award for Camera Work – David Parer
- Special Award for Achievement in Victorian Television – Keith Taylor
- Special Award for Special Event – Australia Live: The Celebration of a Nation – Peter Faiman
- Special Award for Achievement – Geoffrey Robertson's Hypotheticals for Blood on the Wattle
- Colin Bednall Award for Lifetime Achievement – Eric Pearce

=== 1989 ===
- Best Miniseries – Edens Lost (ABC)
- Best Drama Series – The Flying Doctors (Nine Network)
- Best Drama Serial – Neighbours (Channel Ten)
- Best Children's Drama – A Waltz Through the Hills
- Best Children's Program – Wild Wombat (Channel Seven)
- Best Light Entertainment Program – The Money or the Gun (ABC)
- Best Special Event Program – John Farnham and the MSO
- Best Comedy Program – Fast Forward (Channel Seven)
- Best News Program – National Nine News
- Best Weekly Current Affairs Program – Four Corners (ABC)
- Best Daily Current Affairs Program – A Current Affair (Nine Network)
- Best Sports Program – 1989 Australian Masters (Channel Seven)
- Best Documentary – Nobody's Children
- Colin Bednall Award for Lifetime Achievement – Marie Trevor, producer

=== 1990 ===
Held at the Hilton Hotel, Melbourne on 1 December 1990.

- Best News Story – Fall of the Berlin Wall (Nine Network)
- Best Light Entertainment Program – Burke's Backyard
- Best Drama Series – G.P.
- Best Drama Serial – Home and Away
- Best Sports Program –
- Best Sports Presenters –
- Best Light Entertainment Presenter
- Best Sports Reporter – Stephen Phillips, Channel Nine

== See also ==
- List of television awards
