= Ray Meagher =

Australian actor (born 1944)

Ray Meagher OAM
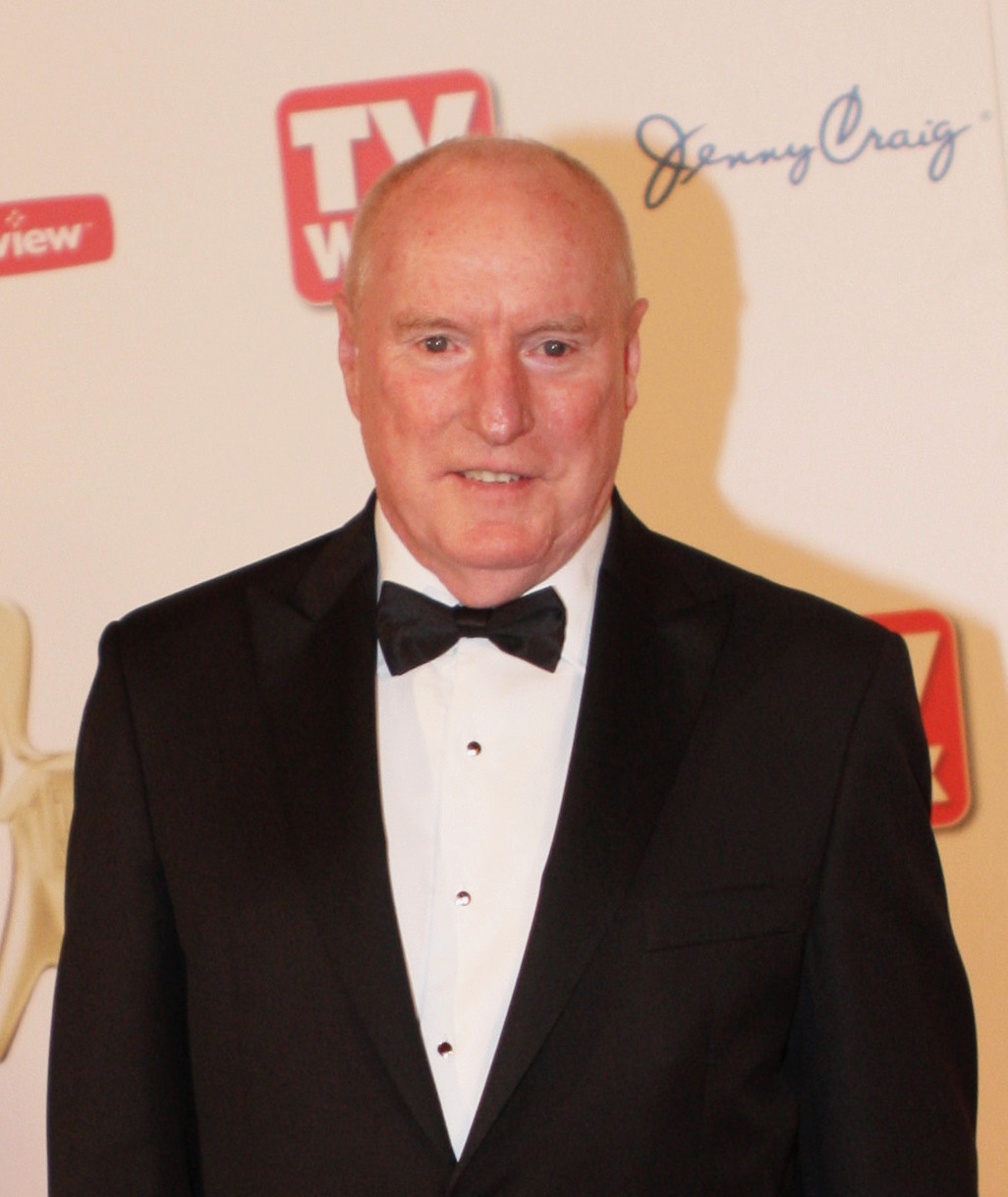
- Born: 4 July 1944 (age 82); Roma, Queensland, Australia
- Occupation: Actor
- Years active: 1972–present
- Spouse: Gilly Meagher (m. 2010)

Raymond Francis Meagher (born 4 July 1944) is an Australian actor, who has appeared in Australian film and television since the mid-1970s. He is notable as the longest continuing performer in an Australian television role, portraying Alf Stewart on Home and Away, having played the role since the first episode in 1988. Meagher won a Gold Logie Award for his role in Home and Away in 2010 and has currently played the role of Alf for over 37 years.

== Early life ==
Meagher was born in Roma, Queensland and spent the early years of his life on Eidsvold Cattle Station while attending a Wondai convent school. At the age of nine, he moved to the Gold Coast to begin boarding school at Marist College Eagle Heights. Meagher completed his secondary schooling at Marist College Ashgrove in Brisbane where he became a keen sportsman at high school, representing the school at a number of sports including rugby union, a sport which he ultimately played at state level.

Meagher played at first five eighth for Queensland at senior level in the late 1960s, including playing against France.

== Career ==
=== Film ===
Meagher played Sergeant Drummond in the 1980 war drama Breaker Morant, which he said was one of his favourite roles. His other film appearances include The Chant of Jimmie Blacksmith (1978), Newsfront (1978), My Brilliant Career (1979), The Shiralee (1987), Mad Dog Morgan (1976), Money Movers (1978), The Odd Angry Shot (1979), The Earthling (1980), Hoodwink (1981), Runaway Island (1982), and The Fire in the Stone (1984). He had a cameo in the 1979 war comedy The Odd Angry Shot.

=== Television ===
Meagher first appeared on television as host of the late night ABC folk music programme Around Folk in June–August 1973. His first regular acting work on television was in the soap opera Number 96, briefly appearing as Fred Shrimpton in 1977. Meagher became "a much in demand character actor", with his early television roles including Matlock Police, Ben Hall, Rush, Certain Women, Pig in a Poke, The Restless Years, Glenview High, The Oracle, Kingswood Country, Cop Shop, Skyways, Sporting Chance, Holiday Island, and Bellamy. Subsequent television acting roles included three different roles as villains in Prisoner, including Geoff Butler between 1979 and 1980, Kurt Renner in 1984, and Ernest Craven in 1986. He also had two different guest starring roles in A Country Practice and substantial roles in several 1980s miniseries.

In 1984, Meagher was cast in the Nine Network miniseries A Fortunate Life, based on Albert Facey's book of the same name. He plays the role of evil cattle-rustler Bad Bob. Marie Ussher of TV Week observed that Meagher was often cast as the "baddie" or tough, ruthless characters in his early career. He also appeared in an episode of Five Mile Creek as Irish bushranger Lightning Ridge. Meagher won a Penguin Award for Best Lead Actor in an Australian telemovie for his starring role in Mail Order Bride (1984) for the ABC. He filmed the 12-part series Five Times Dizzy in Sydney in 1986. Meagher played The Red Headed Person, who was billed as "a tough standover man." Meagher liked playing "heavy" characters, who showed their lighter sides. While filming Five Times Dizzy, Meagher also flew back and forth to Melbourne to film miniseries The Great Bookie Robbery in which he plays Bob Temple. During the same period, he also made an appearance in A Country Practice as alcoholic, pub owner Wally, followed by a role in television film The Blue Lightning for America's CBS network.

Meagher joined the cast of soap opera Home and Away in 1987 and has appeared in the role of Alf Stewart continuously since the first episode aired in January 1988. Meagher holds a Guinness World Record as the longest-serving actor in an Australian serial. Meagher also appeared in the 1988 children's series The True Story of Spit MacPhee, along with John Bach and Elspeth Ballantyne.

In September 2009, Meagher was the third-highest paid personality on Australian television, behind Eddie McGuire and Rove McManus.

Meagher won the Gold Logie Award for Most Popular Personality on Australian Television at the 2010 Logie Awards, where he was also nominated for "Most Popular Actor". Meagher subsequently won that Logie Award in 2018.

=== Stage ===
In 2007, Meagher took over the role of Bob the mechanic in Priscilla Queen of the Desert from Bill Hunter. From 30 September 2010, he took over the role of Bob in the West End production of Priscilla until March 2011. In June 2011, it was announced that Meagher would be returning to the West End production from October. He then rejoined the show for its New Zealand tour in 2016.

Meagher regularly travelled to the United Kingdom to take part in the traditional Christmas pantomimes. From December 1996 until early January 1997, he played Baron Hardup in the Chichester Festival Theatre's production of Cinderella. From November 1999 until January 2000, he starred in a production of Peter Pan at the Grand Opera House in Belfast. In December 2008, he played Abanazar in a production of Aladdin at the Anvil Theatre in Basingstoke and in 2009 he performed as Captain Hook in Peter Pan at the Assembly Hall Theatre in Royal Tunbridge Wells.

== Filmography ==
=== Film ===
Year	Title	Role	Notes
1978	The Chant of Jimmie Blacksmith	Dud Edmonds	
1978	Newsfront	Len's Second Brother	
1979	The Odd Angry Shot	Range Corporal	
1979	My Brilliant Career	Mailman	
1979	The Journalist	Senior Investigator	
1980	Breaker Morant	Sgt. Maj. Drummond	
1980	Mystery Island	Policeman	
1980	A Piece of Cake	Duty Sarglant	Short film
1981	Hoodwink	Shaw	
1982	On the Run	Joe Thompson	
1984	On the Loose	Russell Leech	
1984	The Fire in the Stone	Dosh	
1985	Relatives	Herb Taylor	
1985	Bootleg	Lawker	
1986	Short Changed	Marshall	
1987	Dark Age	Rex Garret	
1987	The Place at the Coast	Uncle Doug	
1989	Luigi's Ladies	Lance	

=== Television ===
Year	Title	Role	Notes
1973	Around Folk	Host	
1973	Matlock Police	Kurt Fisher	Episode: "By Hook or by Crook"
1976	Do I Have to Kill My Child?	Des	TV film
1977	Number 96	Fred Shrimpton	Season 6
1978	Glenview High	Policeman	Episode: "Accident"
1978	Run From the Morning		
1978	Because He's My Friend	Kevin	TV film
1979	Skyways	Sergeant Murphy	Episode: "The Crated Crim"
1979	Top Mates		Miniseries
1979–80; 1984; 1986	Prisoner	Geoff Butler / Ernest Craven / Kurt Renner	Season 1–2; 28 episodes
1981	Sporting Chance		
1981	Holiday Island		
1982–86	A Country Practice	Wally Stanley / Trev Bennett / Tom Skilton	6 episodes
1982	Mystery at Castle House	Stakovich	TV film
1982	Runaway Island		TV film
1983	The Weekly's War	Frank Packer	Miniseries
1983	The Disappearance of Azaria Chamberlain	Mr. Lowe	TV film
1984	Five Mile Creek	Lightning Ridge	Episode: "The Hangman's Noose"
1984	Kingswood Country	Keith Mitchell / Bank Manager	2 episodes
1984	Mail Order Bride	Kevin	TV film
1985	A Fortunate Life	Bad Bob	Miniseries. Episode: "Starting Out (1897–1905)"
1985	Mother and Son	Geoff	Episode: "The Card Game"
1985	Colour in the Creek	Clarrie	8 episodes
1986	Land of Hope		Miniseries
1986	Five Times Dizzy	The Red Headed Person	
1986	The Great Bookie Robbery	Bob Temple	Miniseries
1986	The Blue Lightning	Hale	TV film
1987	The Shiralee	Polkadot	TV film
1988	True Believers	Tom Burke	Miniseries
1988	The True Story of Spit MacPhee	Frank Arbuckle	Miniseries
1988	Vietnam	Army Sergeant	Miniseries
1988	Spit MacPhee	Frank Arbuckle	
1988–present	Home and Away	Alf Stewart	Series regular
2002	Home and Away: Secrets and the City	Alf Stewart	Video special
2003	Home and Away: Hearts Divided	Alf Stewart	Video special

=== Theatre ===
Year	Title	Role	Notes
1975	The Floating World		Nimrod Theatre Company
1996–1997	Cinderella	Baron Hardup	Chichester Festival Theatre
1999–2000	Peter Pan	Captain Hook	Grand Opera House, Belfast
2007	Priscilla Queen of the Desert	Bob the mechanic	Regent Theatre, Melbourne
2008	Aladdin	Abanazar	Anvil Theatre in Basingstoke
2009	Peter Pan	Captain Hook	Assembly Hall Theatre, Tunbridge Wells
2010–2011	Priscilla Queen of the Desert	Bob the mechanic	West End of London
2016	Priscilla Queen of the Desert	Bob the mechanic	New Zealand tour

== Awards and nominations ==
Year	Association	Category	Work	Result	Ref
1984	Penguin Awards	Best Actor	Mail Order Bride	Won	
2008	Digital Spy Soap Awards	Most Popular Actor	Home and Away	Nominated	
2004	Inside Soap Awards	Best Actor	Home and Away	Nominated	
2006	Inside Soap Awards	Best Actor	Home and Away	Nominated	
2006	Inside Soap Awards	Funniest Star	Home and Away	Nominated	
2018	Inside Soap Awards	Best Daytime Star	Home and Away	Won	
2019	Inside Soap Awards	Best Daytime Star	Home and Away	Nominated	
2020	Inside Soap Awards	Best Daytime Star	Home and Away	Nominated	
2010	Logie Awards	Most Popular Personality on Australian Television	Home and Away	Won	
2010	Logie Awards	Most Popular Actor	Home and Away	Nominated	
2012	Logie Awards	Most Popular Actor	Home and Away	Nominated	
2018	Logie Awards	Most Popular Actor	Home and Away	Won	
2019	Logie Awards	Most Popular Actor	Home and Away	Nominated	
2022	Logie Awards	Most Popular Personality on Australian Television	Home and Away	Nominated	
2022	Logie Awards	Most Popular Actor	Home and Away	Nominated	
2023	Logie Awards	Most Popular Actor	Home and Away	Nominated	

Awards and achievements
Preceded by Rebecca Gibney for Packed to the Rafters	Gold Logie Award; Most Popular Personality on Australian Television; 2010 for Home and Away	Succeeded by Karl Stefanovic for Today
