= Stephen MacLean =

Australian writer and filmmaker

Stephen MacLean (1950 – April 2006) was an Australian screenwriter, journalist, broadcaster, and director of films and television series. His best known work is a biography of Peter Allen which was adapted to create the hit musical The Boy from Oz, and wrote the script of the 1982 semi-autobiographical film Starstruck. He was also an amateur musicologist, with extensive knowledge of the songs and the singers of the mid-20th century, and worked with many musicians.

== Early life ==
MacLean was born in 1950 and grew up in Williamstown, a suburb of Melbourne, Victoria. His mother worked in a pub and his merchant seaman father was often away, until he was injured in an accident at sea. After this the family ran a corner store. He had an older brother, Lewis, and two sisters. After discovering Judy Garland at the age of 12, MacLean started a record collection and became an avid reader. His father left the family and Lewis was killed in a car accident when Stephen was 15 years old, which affected his mother profoundly.

He started going to revues and dreamt of a career in show business. After persuading his sister to phone theatrical agents on his behalf, he started getting parts as an extra in television series.

== Career ==
MacLean, obsessed with show biz, loved Garland, Frances Faye and other stars. He started by doing cleaning and odd jobs at Crawford Productions, and after a while became a studio floor manager. After leaving Crawford, in the late 1960s he started work at the pop music magazine Go-Set, along with Molly Meldrum and David Elfick, in Melbourne and then Sydney. At this time he also worked on ABC Television's music show GTK.

In the early 1970s he began travelling, and for many years lived between Sydney, New York, Los Angeles (where he got to know Peggy Lee) and London. He got to know Jim Sharman, who created The Rocky Horror Show in 1973, and even worked on the show for a while.

In Australia, he worked freelance, again doing some work for ABC Television, including creating documentaries on Johnny O'Keefe and his promoter, Lee Gordon.

== Film ==
When in London, his old friend David Elfick visited him, and gave him £300 to write the screenplay for the film that became Starstruck (1982), a film musical directed by Gillian Armstrong. The story was based on his own childhood and the pub in which his mother worked, the Newport Hotel near the Newport railway station. Elfick produced the film, and he and MacLean wanted to select the music for it, but in the end let Armstrong had different ideas, and they all agreed that it was a good soundtrack.

A few years later he wrote the screenplay for and directed Around the World in 80 Ways (1988), which was produced by Elfick and starred Philip Quast, Kelly Dingwall, Diana Davidson, Gosia Dobrowolska, Allan Penney and Rob Steele. However this film, MacLean's only feature film as director, did not do well at the box office, partly because of its late and limited distribution (it was completed in 1986 and only released in the US in 1988).

== Peter Allen ==
MacLean is said to have idolised Peter Allen, after first meeting him when he talked his way into meeting him after a performance one night. He followed his career all over the world, interviewed him many times, filmed his Australian solo cabaret debut, and became close to Allen's mother, Marion Woolnough. After Allen's death in 1992 MacLean started work on a biography of Allen, which was published in 1996, entitled Peter Allen: The Boy from Oz, (alternative title The Boy from Oz: The Peter Allen Story). This work was later adapted to create the hit musical The Boy from Oz.

While working on the biography, he suggested making Allen's life into a film to producer Ben Gannon, having previously alerted Gannon to Allen's work back in the early 1970s. Gannon, however, thought that a documentary should come first, and produced The Boy from Oz, which was written and directed by MacLean. This screened on ABC Television in 1995.

After the biography was published in 1996, Gannon and Robert Fox decided to use the work as the basis for a stage musical. The book to be used for the show was commissioned from Nick Enright, and MacLean acted as consultant on workshopping the musical. The Boy from Oz stage musical, directed by Gale Edwards, premiered at Her Majesty's Theatre, Sydney, on 5 March 1998, and went on to play on Broadway and elsewhere with great success.

== Personal life ==
He was an openly gay man, who was 190 cm (6.2 ft) feet tall.

== Later years and death ==
In 2003, MacLean was diagnosed with oesophageal cancer and was treated for it in Sydney, before moving to Thailand. He died in Pattaya in April 2006.
