= Rebecca Riggs =

Australian actress

Rebecca Riggs is an Australian actress best known for her role as Commandant Grayza in the science fiction television series Farscape.

== Career ==
=== Film ===
Riggs had parts in films such as Jerry Maguire and Raw Nerve.

=== Television ===
Riggs played the recurring role of Commandant Grayza in the TV show Farscape.

She has also appeared in many Australian television series including Backberner, All Saints, Day of the Roses, Medivac and Fire.

=== Theatre ===
Riggs has appeared as a stage performer in Australia with such companies as Bell Shakespeare Company, Queensland Theatre Company, Darwin Theatre Company, La Boite and TN.

She has undertaken a variety of theatre roles . She has played Juliet and Lady Capulet in two different productions of Romeo and Juliet, Lady Macbeth in Macbeth, Trinculo in The Tempest, Bianca in Othello, Viola in Twelfth Night and Kate in The Taming of the Shrew. She has also appeared in modern Australian plays including the musicals Summer Rain and an acclaimed performance as Judy Garland in The Boy from Oz.

Riggs has performed a one woman/fifteen character show The Tall Green Stranger in the Ceramic Pot, and also in cabarets at the L.A. Creation Conventions in 2009 and 2011: The Shower Show (2009) and Witch Way? (2011).

She has performed with many improvisational troupes throughout Australia and has sung with bands, choirs and a cappella groups such as Darc Marc, The Lutin Girls Choir, The Star Pickets, Schrödinger's Cats, and many more.

== Filmography ==
=== Film ===
Year	Title	Role	Type
1990	Raw Nerve		Feature film
1996	Jerry Maguire		Feature film
1999	Alien Cargo	Meryl Leonardi, SSS17 Sleeper	Feature film

=== Television ===
Year	Title	Role	Type
1995	Fire	Jane Connor	TV series, 2 episodes
1995	Space: Above and Beyond	Mrs Vansen	TV series, 1 episode
1996	Medivac	Mary Jessup	TV series, 1 episode
1996	Gladiators	Competitor	TV game show
1998	Day of the Roses	Cherilyn Skow	TV miniseries, 2 episodes
	Backberner		TV series
1999-2005	All Saints	Jenny Carmichael / Brenda Stewart	TV series, 2 episodes: Desperate Remedies, False Convictions
2002-03	Farscape	Commandant Grayza	TV series, 12 episodes
2004	Farscape: The Peacekeeper Wars	Commandant Grayza	TV miniseries, 2 episodes
2019	Reef Break	Jan / Realtor	TV series, 1 episode
2020	The End	Ella the Group Leader	TV series, 1 episode

== Personal life ==
She is also now committed to refining communication in disaster and crisis through her work with consultancy Crisis Ready and the not for profit organization Emergency Media and Public Affairs. She is a fan of the Sci Fi genre.
