= Summer of the Seventeenth Doll (disambiguation) =

Summer of the Seventeenth Doll is a 1955 Australian play by Ray Lawler.

Summer of the Seventeenth Doll may also refer to:

- Summer of the Seventeenth Doll (1959 film), an Australian-British film based on the play
- Summer of the Seventeenth Doll (1964 film), a British TV adaptation of the play
- Summer of the Seventeenth Doll (1978 film), an Australian TV film adaptation of the play
- Summer of the Seventeenth Doll (opera), a 1996 chamber opera based on the play
