= Spring & Fall =

Australian anthology television series

Spring & Fall is an Australian anthology television series concerning social problems like unemployment, alcoholism, and drug addiction.

There were ten self-contained episodes, six in the first series broadcast by the ABC in 1980 and four in the second series in 1982.

The first season started in August 1980 with "Cold Comfort" which focused on the subject of unemployment. In the Canberra Times Keith Gosman said "'Cold Comfort' did its best to document rather than to preach and that was its strength." The second episode "The Last Card" tackled alcoholism with Brian Courtis writing in the Age "'The Last Card' is valuable drama. It arouses and stimulates without scraping its fingernails on the blackboard of one's brain." "The Silent Cry" looks at a failing marriage which brings up a disturbing past. "Winner" follows a ruthless real estate agent. "The Slammer" sees a young man who is sent to prison. John Teerds in the Age says it is "rich in realism" and is "finely constructed" and he praises Ian Gilmour's performance in the lead role. In some places this was the final with the sixth episode "Out of Line" showing in 1981 as a "refugee episode". It showed Jamie fleeing to King's Cross and getting involved in drugs and prostitution. The Ages Barbara Hooks wrote "But instead of coming away in deep mourning for lost youth and families in despair. I experienced an uncomfortable feeling that the principal characters in the play deserved what they got as victims of their own folly. Even if they were written realistically to evoke such a callous response is surely self-defeating if not dangerous in a play which could have and should have aroused compassion and conscience. The Sydney Morning Herald's Garry Shelley says "Yves Stening and Ric Herbert are splendid as Jamie and Sadie in roles which are quite taxing and, at times, unpleasant. Writer Oliver Robb has given them a good script and director Chris Tomson has made certain that they retain their naturalness."

Season two opened in June 1982 with "Every Man For Herself" which featured Angela in a sweat shop looking at problems faced by immigrant workers. Garrie Hutchinson in the Age wrote "What we had was the argument, very well done, lots of points made, good gritty naturalistic acting — what it could flower into is a kind of When The Boat Come In." Jane Inglis in the Tribune said "The value of programs like Every Man for Herself is the exposure given to real social problems and, specifically, its usefulness in trade union training schemes." "Perfect Company" sees Ruth Cracknell playing an elderly lady who is a victim of youth violence. The next episode "Jimmy Dancer" was delayed for a week due to ABC's birthday celebrations. It told of a radio announcer dying from cancer. Jenny Tabakoff in the Sydney Morning Herald said "Dont be put off by its subject, Jimmy Dancer is thoughtful and thought-provoking Australian drama at its best." The last episode was "Thanks Brother" which looked at a three month strike.

== Episodes ==
=== Season One ===
No.	Title	Director	Writer	Starring
1.1	"Cold Comfort"	Chris Thomson	Laura Jones	Steve Bisley, Lynette Curran, Fiona Page, Mark Kounnas, Pega Williams
1.2	"The Last Card"	Michael Jenkins		Max Gillies, Robyn Nevin, Arkie Whiteley, Adam Garnett
1.3	"The Silent Cry"	Michael Carson	Marion Ord	Michele Fawdon, Edmund Pegge, Anne Haddy, Annette Andre, Robert Alexander
1.4	"Winner"	Chris Thomson	John Dingwell	Graeme Blundell, Willie Fennell, Phillip Ross, Joyce Jacobs, Christine Amor
1.5	"The Slammer"	Russell Webb	Mervyn Rutherford	Ian Gilmour, Barry Otto, Gary Waddell, Beverley Blankenship
1.6	"Out of Line"	Chris Thomson	Oliver Robb	Yves Stening, Ric Herbert, Carole Skinner, John Hamblin, Ilene Woods, Tracy Mann

=== Season Two ===
No.	Title	Director	Writer	Starring
2.1	"Every Man for Herself"	Michael Carson	Laura Jones	Filomena Calabria, Mark Hashfield, Sheila Kennelly, Lynne Porteous, Joe Hasham.
2.2	"Perfect Company"	Di Drew	Marion Ord	Ruth Cracknell, Robyn Nevin, Dorothy St. Heaps
2.3	"Jimmy Dancer"	Michael Carson	Robert Caswell	Garry McDonald, Judy Morris, Leeanne Starr
2.4	"Thanks Brother"	Julian Pringle	Michael Jenkins	Paul Chubb, Les Foxcroft, Dennis Miller, Rob Baxter, Ian Mortimer

The first episode, "Cold Comfort", received a Logie Award for Best Single Drama in 1981. Judy Morris won a Logie for her performance in Jimmy Dancer. Michell Fawdon won for Best Actress in a Single TV Performance at the 1981 Sammy Awards. Oliver Robb won the Penguin Award for Drama Script fot "Out of Line".
