= The Custodian =

1993 Australian film by John Dingwall

- UK DVD cover
- Directed by: John Dingwall
- Written by: John Dingwall
- Produced by: Adrienne Read
- Starring: Anthony LaPaglia; Hugo Weaving; Barry Otto; Kelly Dingwall
- Cinematography: Steve Mason
- Edited by: Michael Honey
- Music by: Phillip Houghton
- Release date: 16 September 1993 (Australia)
- Country: Australia
- Language: English

The Custodian is a 1993 Australian mystery thriller film written and directed by John Dingwall in his last directorial effort. The film stars Anthony LaPaglia, Hugo Weaving, Barry Otto, and Dingwall's real life son Kelly Dingwall in his last feature film before he retired from acting in 1997. LaPaglia plays Det. Sgt. James Quinlan, a police officer who attempts to bring to justice a cabal of corrupt cops, which includes his partner, Det. Frank Church, played by Weaving.

John Dingwall claims that he wrote around 16 drafts of the script.

It received three Australian Film Institute nominations.

== Plot ==
Detective Sgt. James Quinlan leaves his alcoholic wife after years of being nagged about their lifestyle, comparing him unfavourably with his friend and partner Frank Church whom he believes, but cannot prove, is corrupt. He abandons his straight life to join Church in order to get on the inside of the circle of double-agents, whose extent he cannot guess but must include high-ranking police, and probably judiciary and media. He establishes contacts with a young idealistic reporter and Ferguson, an Internal Affairs lawyer without revealing his identity, meanwhile building a dossier of corrupt officers, including himself. For his own protection he confides in no-one, and at the resulting trial is convicted and sentenced to 12 years' jail with six others. Only a codeword, "chicken neck", spoken by Quinlan leads the reporter to guess the truth and collaborates with Ferguson in getting Quinlan a reduced sentence.

== Cast ==
- Anthony LaPaglia as Detective Sgt. James Quinlan
- Hugo Weaving as Detective Frank Church
- Barry Otto as Internal Affairs lawyer Brian Ferguson
- Kelly Dingwall as reporter Tony Reynolds
- Essie Davis as coffee shop proprietor Jilly
- Gosia Dobrowolska as police secretary Josie
- Skye Wansey as Claire Ferguson
- Khristina Totos (credited as Christina Totos) as Pixie Church
- Naomi Watts as Louise
- Joy Smithers as Helen Quinlan
- Bill Hunter as managing director
- Tim McKenzie as Beeston
- Norman Kaye as Judge
- Steven Grives as Brennan
- Bogdan Koca as psychologist
- Russell Newman as Police Commissioner
- Andrew Sharp as Ross Delhunty
- Andrew S. Gilbert as cameraman
- Wayne Pygram as Detective Massey
- Bob Baines as Detective Inspector Blewitt
- Kee Chan as chief executive
- Shane McNamara as Antonavitch
- John Batchelor as waiter
