= John Dingwall =

Australian screenwriter (1940–2004)

- Born: Rockhampton, Queensland, Australia
- Died: May 3, 2004; Murwillumbah, New South Wales
- Occupations: Screenwriter, director, journalist
- Children: 5

John Dingwall (died 3 May 2004) was an Australian writer of film and television, best known for his screenplay Sunday Too Far Away (1975). Dingwall should not be confused with the Scottish journalist of the same name.

== Career ==
Dingwall was born in Rockhampton, Queensland, where he commenced his career as a journalist with a cadetship at the city's daily newspaper, The Morning Bulletin. He then moved to Sydney, where he worked as a police reporter for The Sydney Morning Herald.

His experience with the courts and police kickstarted a career in television drama, when he began writing for television production house Crawford Productions, working on police procedural series such as Homicide and Division Four. He won a 1970 Australian Writers' Guild Award (AWGIE) for writing the episode “Johnny Reb” of Homicide.

He moved into features with 1975 Australian New Wave film Sunday Too Far Away, which was based on his brother-in-law's experiences as a sheep shearer.

In 1977, Dingwall co-created and co-wrote the award-winning television series Pig in a Poke. In 1983, he penned the Australian Film Institute Award-winning screenplay for the comedy adventure film Buddies. Faced with distribution difficulties, he took the film on the road, touring it around regional Queensland cinemas. He later mortgaged his house to finance the 1988 cult horror film Phobia, which he wrote and directed.

== Personal life ==
Dingwall had five children, including his son Kelly Dingwall, and former actor, best known for his roles as Brian 'Dodge' Forbes in the soap opera Home and Away and a rookie reporter Tony Reynolds in the 1993 mystery thriller film The Custodian.

== Death ==
Dingwall died of cancer in Murwillumbah, northern New South Wales, just south of the Gold Coast on 3 May 2004, at the age of 63. His partner at the time of his death was Dimitra Meleti.

== Filmography ==
=== Film ===
Year	Title	Role	Notes
1975	Sunday Too Far Away	Writer	Feature film
1983	Buddies	Writer / Producer	Feature film
1987	Phobia	Director / Writer	Feature film
1993	The Custodian	Director / Writer	Feature film

=== Television ===
Year	Title	Role	Notes
1968–1974	Homicide	Writer	13 episodes
1970	Dynasty	Writer	Season 1, episode 6: "Paper of the People"
1970–1972	Division 4	Writer	9 episodes
1972	Matlock Police	Writer	Season 2, episode 59: "The Cow Hand"
1973	The Comedy Game	Writer	Season 2, episode 2: "Catch What I Mean?"
1975	The Seven Ages of Man	Director/ Writer	Miniseries, episode 3: "The Lover"
1977	Pig in a Poke	Writer / Creator	
1980	Spring & Fall	Writer	Anthology series, episode: "Winner"
1998	Wildside	Writer	Season 1
