= Alien Cargo =

- VHS cover
- Genre: Science fiction
- Written by: Carla Jean Wagner
- Directed by: Mark Haber
- Starring: Jason London; Missy Crider; Simon Westaway; Elizabeth Alexander; Alan Dale; Warwick Young
- Music by: Patrick O'Hearn
- Country of origin: United States
- Original language: English

Production
- Executive producer: Chip Hayes
- Producer: Michael Lake
- Cinematography: John Stokes
- Editor: Joel Goodman
- Running time: 90 minutes
- Production companies: Village Roadshow Pictures; Wilshire Court Productions

Original release
- Network: UPN
- Release: January 28, 1999

Alien Cargo is a 1999 American science fiction television film directed by Mark Haber, written by Carla Jean Wagner, and starring Jason London, Missy Crider, Elizabeth Alexander and Alan Dale. In the film, a space-cargo transport ship is attacked by an unknown alien life form that manipulates all organic life into releasing their inner evil psyche. It aired on UPN on January 28, 1999.

== Plot ==
After months of hyper-sleep aboard the cargo transport ship Solar System Shipping Vessel No.17 (SSS-17), two crew members awaken: Chris McNiel and Theta Kaplan. They discover that they've been awakened from hyper-sleep, by the ship's computer, almost ten months past their scheduled time, as something has gone terribly wrong on board. The ship's internal systems are badly damaged, they have almost no fuel and their position is some way off the ecliptic. They slowly realize that the vessel's first shift probably killed each other and caused the ship's desolation but, as of yet, they don't know why. They calculate that they have only nine hours of life-support power left and then it will fail. With the help of the ship's log they discover a space probe that one of the crew of the first shift brought on board. They then find a strange substance and begin to analyze it.

Soon after the discovery of the probe and the substance they start to argue, which quickly escalates into violence. They then try to kill each other in a running struggle throughout the damaged ship. Meanwhile, the crew of a nearby deep-space research ship following a comet and which has been alerted to their predicament evaluate if they can attempt a rescue.

Trapped in the freezing cargo hold, a near hypothermic Kaplan regains her senses and realises that the strange substance must be a biological agent which induces psychosis but becomes inert at low body temperatures. Based upon this information the ship's computer suggests a drug which should cure the infection. After injecting herself with the cure, Kaplan manages to trap a still psychotic McNiel and treat him. The two then have to convince the reluctant research ship to try a rescue plan to slingshot the crew over. As they make departure preparations, they discover that the drug had only a temporary effect and that they are still infected and cannot risk contaminating the rest of the crew or their rescuers.

They decide to transfer the uninfected sleepers over with minutes to spare before their sleep chambers fail. McNiel and Kaplan decide to remain with No.17 as it hurtles towards the sun, to prevent future contamination. To while away the time left, they dismantle the probe and discover that it contains a canister of the blue contaminant. It is discovered that the probe was originally from Earth and they speculate that it picked up the virus in space and went on to accidentally contaminate an unknown alien race, who then sent the probe back where it came from as some kind of retaliation.

== Cast ==
- Jason London as Christopher 'Chris' McNiel
- Missy Crider as Theta Kaplan
- Simon Westaway as Adam Iberra, SSS17 First Watch
- Elizabeth Alexander as Rojean Page, Explorer Dolphin
- Alan Dale as Eichhorn, Explorer Dolphin
- Warwick Young as Omer Janowitz, SSS17 First Watch
- David Ross Paterson as Warren Schiedell, SSS Group Manager (as David Paterson)
- Kevin Copeland as Hunt Ballard, SSS17 Sleeper
- Diana Glenn as Leilani Griffin, SSS17 Sleeper
- Theresa Wong as Yvonne Hagan, SSS17 Sleeper
- Jennifer Congram as Voice of Shoshoni, SSS17 Computer / SSS Communication Central
- Julian Garner as a Titan Miner
- Helen Houard as Eli Follette, SSS17 Sleeper
- Rebecca Riggs as Meryl Leonardi, SSS17 Sleeper
- Sean Dennehy as Rupert O'Day, SSS17 Sleeper
