= Mail Order Bride (1984 film) =

- Directed by: Stephen Wallace
- Written by: Robyn Davidson
- Produced by: Michael Carson
- Starring: Ray Meagher; Charito Ortez
- Cinematography: Julian Penney
- Edited by: William Russo
- Music by: Ralph Schneider
- Production company: Australian Broadcasting Corporation
- Distributed by: Australian Broadcasting Corporation
- Release date: 2 September 1984
- Running time: 86 minutes
- Country: Australia
- Language: English

Mail Order Bride is a 1984 Australian television film about a builder who imports a Filipino bride. It was the sixth in a collection of six films in the series Sunday Australian Movies.

== Plot summary ==
After an exchange of letters, a Filipino woman known as "Ampy" (Charito Ortez) marries Kevin (Ray Meagher), a builder living in a caravan park in a small town in far-western New South Wales. They struggle to adjust to life together as religious and cultural differences, combined with the inherent violence, alcohol abuse and racism of the isolated community, threaten to destroy any chance of their marriage succeeding. It isn't until Kevin's 'best mate' Tommo (Paul Sonkkila) bashes and rapes Ampy that Kevin eventually finds the courage to turn his back on his old life and move away to start over with Ampy in a new town.

== Cast ==
- Ray Meagher as Kevin
- Sheila Kennelly as Dorothy
- Charito Ortez as Ampy
- Paul Sonkkila as Tommo
- Robert Noble as Donnie
- Lorrie Cruickshank as Ruth
- Bill Conn as John
- Justine Saunders as Iris
- Frank McNamara as Priest
- Brian Anderson as Mayor
- Bob Barrett as Keith
- Geoffrey Brown as First Cop (as Jeffrey Brown)
- Peter Calrow as Publican (as Peter Galrow)
- Paul Gillett as First Man
- Lillian Crombie as Aboriginal Woman
- Lily Shearer as Woman in Pub

== Reception ==
Marie McNamara of The Age says "Mail-Order Bride is gripping. It's poignant hilarious local drama at its best. But be warned – it will shame any self-respecting Australian male chauvinist. Mail-Order Bride is a wild indictment of racist Australia." Leonie Lamont in The Sun-Herald said the film "contains all the ugly elements of racism, sexism and ockerism packed into the daily life of a small rural town. While the heavy-handed way in which some of the characters are drawn detracts from its strong message of bigotry, it is nevertheless an intriguing drama." John O'Hara writes in Cinema Papers "Mail-Order Bride is rewarding for its rhythms and transitions, its easy changes of mood and pace, and the way it draws viewers into an understated view of small-town country life and attitudes. It is a scarifying indictment of prejudice, violence and racial terrorism, and deserves a wider release than Sunday-night television. It should become as much part of the culture, and reflections on it, as Wake in Fright. And it does all this without a big-name star and on a small budget. This film vindicates the ABC's attempt to tackle serious issues by commissioning local drama."
