= The Apple Game =

- Directed by: Věra Chytilová
- Starring: Dagmar Bláhová; Jiří Menzel
- Edited by: Alois Fisárek
- Release date: October 1977 (CIFF)
- Running time: 1h 40min
- Country: Czechoslovakia
- Language: Czech

The Apple Game (Czech: Hra o jablko) is a 1977 Czechoslovak comedy film directed by Věra Chytilová.

== Cast ==
- Dagmar Bláhová - Anna Símová
- Jiří Menzel - MUDr. Josef John
- Jiří Kodet - MUDr. Arnost Rýdl
- Evelyna Steimarová - Marta Rýdlová
- Nina Popelíková - John's mother
- Bohuš Záhorský - Professor
