= The Shoe-Horn Sonata =

Play by John Misto

The Shoe Horn Sonatas
- Original language: English
- Written by: John Misto
- Genre: War drama

Premiere
- Date: 1995
- Place: Ensemble Theatre, Sydney

The Shoe-Horn Sonata is a 1995 Australian play by John Misto about Australian nurses in World War II. The play has been much revived and has become a study text in Australian schools.

The play won the Australia Remembers National Play Competition in 1995.
