= Whipping Boy (film) =

1996 Australian television film

- Directed by: Di Drewe
- Written by: Peter Yeldham
- Based on: Whipping Boy by Gabrielle Lord (1992)
- Produced by: Ray Alchin; James Davern
- Starring: Sigrid Thornton; Temuera Morrison
- Cinematography: Geoff Burton
- Edited by: Michael Honey
- Music by: Mike Perjanik
- Release date: November 11, 1996
- Running time: 95 minutes
- Country: Australia
- Language: English

Whipping Boy is a 1996 Australian television film shown on Channel Ten. It was based on Gabrielle Lord's 1992 novel of the same name, adapted by Peter Yeldham, directed by Di Drewe and starred Sigrid Thornton and Temuera Morrison.

== Premise ==
Lawyer, Cass Meredith heads a government taskforce investigating a pedophilia ring in Kings Cross, Sydney.

== Cast ==
- Sigrid Thornton as Cass Meredith
- Temuera Morrison as Jack
- Tammy Macintosh as Seal
- Treffyn Koreshoff as Josh
- Jennifer Vuletic as Loveday
- Ralph Cotterill as Shuffler
- Martin Jacobs
- Kelly Dingwall as Dismal
- Maria Mercedes as Saphra
- Michael Denkha as Komras
- David Baldwin as Headmaster Pantle

== Reception ==
Robin Oliver in The Sydney Morning Herald complimented the performances of the leads saying the film is "Acceptable as strong drama though rapidly drifting into silliness." In The Age’s Green Guide, Jim Schembri wrote "Bad direction. Terrible acting. Awful dialogue. Stupid characters. Offensive treatment. Take your pick, it's all here." Also in The Age, Simon Hughes wrote "As a thriller, Whipping Boy performs its function moderately well. The adenalin rises and rises pretty much as the producers would have it do. Where it falls down is in those nagging details. Why, for instance, would someone like Cass not foresee the danger to her child? And any couch sleuth could smell those red herrings a country kilometre off. But it is the failure of Whipping Boy to even suggest a motive for paedophilia that is its chief failing. In opting for pure entertainment over understanding, its creators have gone for the money rather than the box."

When repeated in 1998, Doug Anderson wrote in The Sydney Morning Herald "How bad is this thriller, adapted from a Gabrielle Lord novel by JNP Productions? So immaculately frightful it took nearly 50 minutes to realise I had seen it before. So relentlessly ordinary that almost every recollection of it had been expunged from memory."
