= Sunday Australian Movies =

Australian anthology series

Sunday Australian Movies was an anthology series of Australian films screened by the ABC from 1984 to 1985. All were shot on film with Australian directors and screenplays.

The first season began on 29 July and ran through to 2 September and all the films were presented by Wendy Hughes.

John O'Hara writes in Cinema Papers "The films have been commissioned from different writers, directors and producers, and the results are very mixed. They differ in subject, mood and style to some extent; they tackle difficult subjects, including unemployment, racism and sexism. They range across personal fantasies about death, sex and the sea. Only one of them, Stephen Wallace's Mail-Order Bride, manages to be entirely successful within the constraints of the series."

Dennis Pryor in the Age wrote "The ABC suffers from a nervous condition known to telepsychiatrists as the Wagstaff complex. The complex reveals itself in the habit of having someone introduce their major offerings as if the viewers were peasants standing in line to be presented to a duchess." Marie McNamara of the Age wrote of Hughes's introductions "The cautious viewer has learned to take these superlatives with a grain of the proverbial". The Sydney Morning Herald's Shorts column commented "Hughes's ums and ahs and tosses of the head looked gratuitous. Why, we. wonder, would you want to pretend someone hasn't prepared something intelligent for you to say?"

The second season began on 8 September 1985 with Natural Causes and ran through to 20 October.

== Episodes ==
Season 1

1. White Man's Legend
2. Man of Letters
3. Kindred Spirits
4. Crime of the Decade
5. Every Move She Makes
6. Mail Order Bride

Season 2

1. Natural Causes
2. The Long Way Home
3. Time's Raging
4. Displaced Persons
5. Breaking Up
6. Rooted
7. Emerging
