= Lisa Peers =

Australian actress (born 1956)

Lisa Peers (born 1956) is an Australian actor who has been active since the 1970s. Her best-known films include Sunday Too Far Away.

She works in the corporate sector.

== Select credits ==
- Sunday Too Far Away (1975)
- Solo (1977)
- Punishment (1981)
- Monkey Grip (1982)
- Buddies (1983)
- Candid Camera on Australia (1989)
