= Václav Dobiáš =

Czech composer (1909–1978)

Václav Dobiáš (22 September 1909 – 18 May 1978) was a Czech composer.

== Life ==
Dobiáš was born in Radčice, Bohemia, Austria-Hungary, on 22 September 1909. He studied in Prague with Josef Bohuslav Foerster (in 1930–1931) and then at the Prague Conservatory under Vítězslav Novák (in 1937–1939).

Many of his early works show considerable influence from folk music. Later in his life he became interested in quarter tone composition, especially after studying with Alois Hába. After working in the Czech Ministry of Information, he became professor at the Prague Academy of Music in 1950. Some of his 1940s and 1950s works, especially his cantatas, were written in praise of communism. His work was also part of the music event in the art competition at the 1948 Summer Olympics.

Dobiáš died in Prague on 18 May 1978.

== Works ==
=== Chamber music ===
- String Quartet No. 1 (1931)
- Sonata for Violin and Piano (1936)
- String Quartet No. 2 (1936)
- Říkadla, Nonet (1938)
- String Quartet No. 3 (1938)
- Sonata for Cello and Piano (1939)
- Lento for 3 harps, 1940
- String Quartet No. 4 (1942)
- Pastorální dechový kvintet, wind quintet (1943)
- Ballade for Viola and Piano (1944)
- Little Suite for Cello and Piano (1944)
- 4 Nocturnes for Cello and Piano (1944)
- Quartettino for String Quartet (1944)
- Dance for Cello and Piano (1946)
- Taneční fantasie (Dance Fantasy), Nonet (1948)
- O rodné zemí, Nonet (1952)

=== Other works ===
- Suite for piano (1939)
- Concertino for violin (1941)
- Stalingrad, cantata (1945)
- Sinfonietta (1946)
- Slavnostní pochod (1948)
- Buduj vlast, posílíš mir (Build Your Country, Strengthen Peace), cantata (1950)
- Symphony No. 2 (1956–57)
- Festive Overture (1966)
