= Radčice =

- Municipality
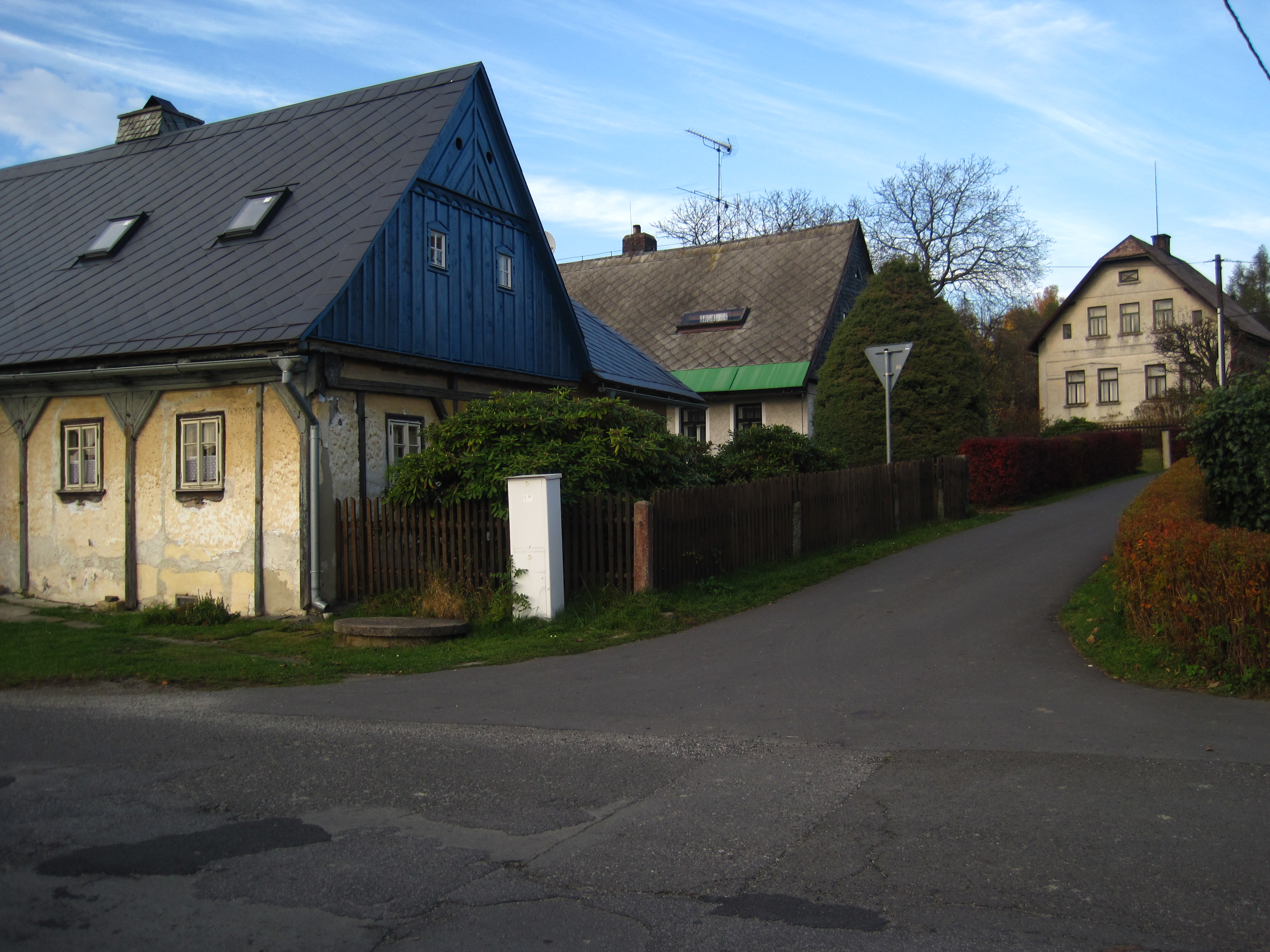
- Houses in Radčice

- Location in the Czech Republic
- Coordinates: 50°40′22″N 15°16′40″E
- Country: Czech Republic
- Region: Liberec
- District: Jablonec nad Nisou
- First mentioned: 1543

Area
  - Total: 1.84 km^{2} (0.71 sq mi)
- Elevation: 545 m (1,788 ft)

Population (2026-01-01)
  - Total: 179
  - Density: 97.3/km^{2} (252/sq mi)
- Time zone: UTC+1 (CET)
  - Summer (DST): UTC+2 (CEST)
- Postal code: 468 22
- Website: www.radcice.eu

Radčice is a municipality and village in Jablonec nad Nisou District in the Liberec Region of the Czech Republic. It has about 200 inhabitants.

== Demographics ==
Historical population
Year	Pop.	±%
1869	347	—
1880	446	+28.5%
1890	422	−5.4%
1900	389	−7.8%
1910	432	+11.1%
1921	405	−6.2%
1930	475	+17.3%
1950	302	−36.4%
1961	316	+4.6%
1970	283	−10.4%
1980	239	−15.5%
1991	187	−21.8%
2001	152	−18.7%
2011	178	+17.1%
2021	182	+2.2%
Source: Censuses

== Notable people ==
- Václav Dobiáš (1909–1978), composer
- Dagmar Bláhová (born 1949), actress
