= Phobia (1988 film) =

- Directed by: John Dingwall
- Written by: John Dingwall
- Produced by: John Mandelberg
- Starring: Gosia Dobrowolska; Sean Scully
- Cinematography: Steve Newman
- Release date: 1988
- Running time: 85 minutes
- Country: Australia
- Language: English
- Budget: AU$120,000

Phobia is a 1988 Australian film written and directed by John Dingwall.

== Cast ==
- Gosia Dobrowolska as Renata Simmons
- Sean Scully as David Simmonds

== Production ==
Dingwall wanted to make the film for as low a budget as possible so wrote it around two characters and one location. He wrote the script in a week.

Paul Thompson was meant to star opposite Gosia Dobrowolska but he dropped out of the project at the least moment and was replaced by Sean Scully. Dingwall mortgaged his house to pay for the budget himself. The film was shot over three weeks in February and March 1988 with a week of rehearsal using a young crew.

== Release ==
The film struggled to obtain a release. It was released via SBS and all the crew were paid their deferments.

It was nominated for Sean Scully as Best Actor at the Australian Film Institute Awards in 1988.
