= Bootleg (1985 film) =

1985 film

- Directed by: John Prescott
- Written by: John Prescott
- Produced by: Trevor Hawkins; John Prescott; Jeanne Taylor
- Starring: John Flaus; Ray Meagher; Carmen Duncan; John Gregg
- Production companies: Bootleg Films; Queensland Film Corporation; Australian Film Commission
- Distributed by: Fatal Visions (video)
- Release date: 1985
- Country: Australia
- Language: English
- Budget: $153,000

Bootleg is a 1985 Australian film directed by John Prescott and starring John Flaus as a detective in Queensland.

== Premise ==
Joe Hart, a private investigator, is sent to Queensland on assignment following a bomb explosion. He becomes involved with a bootleg music racket, a prostitute, the anti-nuclear movement and various other criminals. Some confuse him for Gromonski, a jazz saxophonist.

== Cast ==
- Ray Meagher as Lawker, a conservative policeman
- Carmen Duncan as Rita, a prostitute
- John Gregg as T. C. Brown, an anti-nuclear campaigner
- Max Meldrum as Walter Stone
- lan Nimmo as Lucan
- Shelly Friend as Netha
- John Flaus as Joe Hart
- Trevor Hawkins as Mechanic
- Aaron Lovelock as Paperboy
- Gay Catterall as Annabelle Hart
- Jenny Fern as Receptionist

== Production ==
The film was partly financed by the Queensland Film Corporation who also invested in Prescott's short film A Town Like This which had won an AFI Award for Best Short Film. The movie was also financed by the Australian Film Commission.

== Reception ==
Academic and writer Susan Dermody said she regarded the film as "a loving but usually floundering essay of the detective film noir, with strange elements in it that seem to have seeped over from early Eisenstcin... The most interesting moments arc those that seem about to make use of the undersides of Brisbane in all its seedy, subtropical splendour as a special new landscape of the noir detective story, but the knots of story keep pulling away from this possibility before it really happens. The Queensland politics seem (even for Queensland) overblown, as though the actors escaped the uncertain clutches of the director, John Prescott. Still, with John Flaus in it, its eccentric credentials arc unmisiakeable."

According to academic Susan Ward, "While the film has been lauded for its cinematic flair, the film has a convoluted plot line with many subplots ending up on the cutting room floor, but like Australian Dream, it is a testimony to the level of cooperation and commitment by local crews, to work on features that gave them the opportunity to showcase their creative skills."
