= I've Come About the Suicide =

- Directed by: Sophia Turkiewicz
- Written by: Craig Cronin
- Produced by: James Michael Vernon; Jan Tyrrell
- Starring: Barry Otto; Gosia Dobrowolska
- Production company: Cine Funds Limited
- Release date: 16 December 1988 (TV)
- Running time: 89 mins
- Country: Australia
- Language: English

I've Come About the Suicide is a 1987 Australian comedy about a writer and his man servant who try to convince the world that the writer has gone mad.

== Cast ==
- Barry Otto as Garfield Lawson
- Gosia Dobrowolska as Genevieve Lawson
- Gwen Plumb as Miss Clemesha
- Jonathan Biggins as Bell-hop
- Patrick Ward as John Regus
