= Natural Causes (1985 film) =

- Directed by: Michael Carson
- Written by: John Misto
- Produced by: Michael Carson
- Starring: Geraldine Turner; Gary Day
- Cinematography: Julian Penney
- Edited by: Bill Russo
- Music by: Chris Neal
- Production company: ABC
- Distributed by: ABC
- Release date: 1985
- Country: Australia
- Language: English

Natural Causes is a 1985 Australian television film about ex-hippies having a reunion. It is the first in a series of ABC telemovies showcasing Australian talent. It is the first in the second series of Sunday Australian Movies, ABC telemovies showcasing Australian talent.

== Cast ==
- Geraldine Turner as Danni
- Gary Day as Warren
- Robyn Gurney as Cass
- Bill Young as Jerry

== Reception ==
Barbara Hooks in the Age says "Although it teeters on the brink of the preposterous before recovering its balance towards the climax. 'Natural Cause' is brimming with serrated dialogue (underlined by evocative snatches of '60s and '70s music) deftly delivered by a keen and perceptive cast" In The Age's Green Guide Jason Romney wrote that Natural Causes "is a real mean martini, a blackly comic concoction with tight scripting brought alive by good editing and fine performances." The Age columnist Dennis Pryor wrote "John Misto's writing is witty, grotesque and observant." He finishes "Like all good comedies it is serious. It is about youth and age, past and present, illusion and disillusion, about the Cold Comfort Farm at the end of Memory Lane."

Sydney Morning Herald's Jacqueline Lee Lewes says "Natural Causes, written by John Misto and produced and directed by Michael Carson, is a clever and original black comedy. It is almost a gem, in fact. Unfortunately, Misto presses his luck and at times the humour is overworked." In the Sydney Morning Herald's Guide Bronwyn Watson wrote "Natural Causes is a rather bizarre movie. It's uneven — some scenes make you cringe, while others are quite good. But I found the plot predictable and often the pace drags."
