= Dagmar Bláhová =

Czech actress

- Born: 5 March 1949 (age 77); Radčice, Czechoslovakia
- Other names: Dášha Bláhová, Dasha Bláhová
- Occupation: Actress
- Years active: 1972–present
- Children: 2

Dagmar Bláhová (also credited as Dášha Bláhová; born 5 March 1949) is a Czech actress. She appeared in foreign film and after emigrating to Australia during the Communist era, where she appeared in many television and film roles, she returned to her birth country in 1998 and again started appearing natively in film roles. She became notable on Australian television in 1985 for her role in soap opera Neighbours as original character Maria Ramsay.

== Personal life ==
Bláhová was born in Radčice, Czechoslovakia. When she began her acting career, Czechoslovakia was under communist rule, so citizens were restricted in their movements outside the country, however, Bláhová's popularity in Europe enabled her to perform around the continent. She met her future husband Juraj while she was touring in London. He had an Australian passport, having lived in the country for three years, and he could not return to Czechoslovakia with Bláhová. The couple became engaged in Paris, but struggled to find someone to marry them as Czechoslovak officials discouraged relationships with former citizens. They were eventually married in Brussels at the Australian Embassy, three months after Bláhová gave birth to their first child, a daughter. They then applied for permission to immigrate to Australia. Bláhová and her husband later separated. In 1990, Bláhová gave birth to her second child, a son.

== Career ==
Bláhová attended the Academy of Performing Arts in Prague and graduated with a major in acting and puppetry in 1971. She went onto appear in various theatre productions for Theatre On A String and Cirque Alfred. Bláhová co-created the play Adam and Eve in which she had a starring role. The play was performed over 200 times in 15 countries from 1972 until 1980. She won the Best Performance Award at the Nancy International Theatre Festival in 1975. She then moved into television and film roles. She become known for her roles in Věra Chytilová's comedy films The Apple Game and Calamity. In 1978, she was named as one of the 20 best actors in the world by a panel of Paris cinema critics, following her role in The Apple Game. She moved to Australia in 1980. Bláhová was the first person to appear in the opening episode of A Country Practice, as the pregnant Sandra Myers, whose baby is delivered by main character Terence Elliott (Shane Porteous). Bláhová wrote, directed and starred in a pantomime called The Devil and Katya, which was performed at the Playbox Theatre in 1982. She also had guest roles in Cop Shop and the television film Learned Friend. Bláhová made a second appearance in A Country Practice in 1984. Some of her own ideas formed the basis for the two episodes she appeared in.

In 1985, she was cast as housewife Maria Ramsay in the Seven Network soap opera Neighbours. After leaving the serial that same year, Bláhová starred in Louis Nowra's television film Displaced Persons, which tells the story of European refugees arriving in Australia in 1945. Nowra began working on the film after meeting Blahova in 1981. Bláhová won the Best Performance by an Actress in a Principal Role in a One-off Drama accolade at the 1984 Penguin Awards for her work on the film. Bláhová later bemoaned the lack of comedic roles offered to her, something that she was used to in Czechoslovakia. Instead she was asked to play "poor migrants" or "teary, tragic women." In 1986, she appeared in Rainer Werner Fassbinder's play The Bitter Tears of Petra von Kant for the Sydney Theatre Company. Bláhová said she liked Petra as soon as she read the script. She appeared in several films, including the 1986 television film Funeral Going, Luigo Acquisto's independent film Hungry Heart, and the 1987 comedy-horror film Howling III, in which she plays a Russian ballerina who becomes a werewolf. She also appeared in the 1988 television film The Tourist (also known as Sands of the Bedouin), followed by a starring role in the futuristic rock epic Sons of Steel alongside Robert Hartley, Jeff Duff and Mark Hembrow.

Bláhová later returned to Czechoslovakia and continued to act on screen and in theatre productions. In 2009, Bláhová appeared in the Czech television serial Velmi křehké vztahy as Eliška Tůmová. In 2023, Bláhová's noval Fables from the Other World was published.

== Filmography ==
Film and television performances
Year	Title	Role	Notes
1972	And Give My Love to the Swallows	Julinka	Czech: ...a pozdravuji vlaštovky
1976	The Apple Game	Anna Símová	Czech: Hra o jablko
1978	Leave Me Alone		Czech: Nechci nic slyšet
1981	Calamity	Majka	
1981	Hoodwink	Specialist's Wife	As Dascha Blahova; uncredited
1981	A Country Practice	Sandra Myers	Episodes: "In General Practice (Parts 1 & 2)"
1984	A Country Practice	Tania Menzel	Recurring role
1985	Neighbours	Maria Ramsay	Main cast
1985	Displaced Persons	Anna	Television film
1986	Funeral Going	Helena	Television film
1987	Hungry Heart	Mrs Bono	
1987	Howling III	Olga Gork	
1988	The Tourist	Laila Ibrahaim	Television film
1989	Sons of Steel	Honor	
1990	Muka obraznosti		
1994	Nexus 2.431		
1998	Vykání psovi		
1998	Traps		
2000	Canone inverso – Making Love	Secretary Sophie	
2001	Returning in Autumn		Czech: Podzimní návrat
2004	Když chcípne pes		
2004	The Prince & Me	Lady In Waiting	
2007	Catch the Doctor!	Serafina Pustinová	Czech: Chyťte doktora
2009	Velmi křehké vztahy	Eliška Tůmová	
