= Around the World in 80 Ways (film) =

- Directed by: Stephen MacLean
- Written by: Stephen MacLean
- Produced by: David Elfick
- Starring: Philip Quast; Gosia Dobrowolska
- Music by: Chris Neal
- Production company: Roadshow Films
- Release date: 1988
- Country: Australia
- Language: English
- Budget: AU $2.5 million

Around the World in 80 Ways is an Australian comedy film directed by Stephen MacLean completed in 1986 but only released in 1988. It stars Philip Quast, Gosia Dobrowolska, Kelly Dingwall, Allan Penney and Rob Steele and was the only feature film directed by MacLean.

== Plot ==
Two men try to trick their father Roly, who has dementia and is almost blind, into thinking he has travelled around the world. Roly is shocked to discover that his wife Mavis has gone on holiday around the world with his neighbour and rival in business, Alec. His sons, Wally, a tourism operator whose business is not going well, and Eddie, an unemployed sound engineer, concoct a scheme that will fool their father into thinking that he is going overseas looking for Mavis. To this end, they create, within their family home and Moffatt's McMansion, fake versions of Honolulu, Las Vegas, Rome and Tokyo, assisted by a nurse, Ophelia. Along the way, Eddie and Ophelia fall in love, and the sons grow closer to their father.

== Cast ==
- Allan Penney as Roly Davis
- Diana Davidson as Mavis
- Rob Steele as Alec Moffatt
- Philip Quast as Wally
- Kelly Dingwall as Eddie Davis
- Gosia Dobrowolska as Nurse Ophelia Cox

== Production ==
The film was shot in Sydney with it being used for the fake versions of the other locations.

== Reception ==
Despite some good reviews the film was not a success at the box office. Producer David Elfick blamed this in part on the title, which he felt was confusing. Film critic Richard Kuipers praised the film and said that its lack of renown was at least partly due to it "troubled distribution history". Although actually completed in 1986, it had its first release in the US in March 1988, followed by only a limited rollout in Australian cinemas later in the year.
