= I'm Here, Darlings! =

- Written by: John Croyston
- Directed by: Michael Jenkins
- Starring: Diana Perryman; Lynette Curran
- Country of origin: Australia
- Original language: English

Production
- Producer: Brian Faull
- Running time: 100 mins
- Production company: ABC

Original release
- Network: ABC
- Release: 21 August 1975

I'm Here, Darlings! is a 1975 Australian TV movie about a woman who believes her stepchildren are behind an unusual series of happenings.

A copy of the script is at the University of Queensland.

== Cast ==
- Diana Perryman
- Lynette Curran
- John Gaden
