= Lynette Curran =

Australian actress

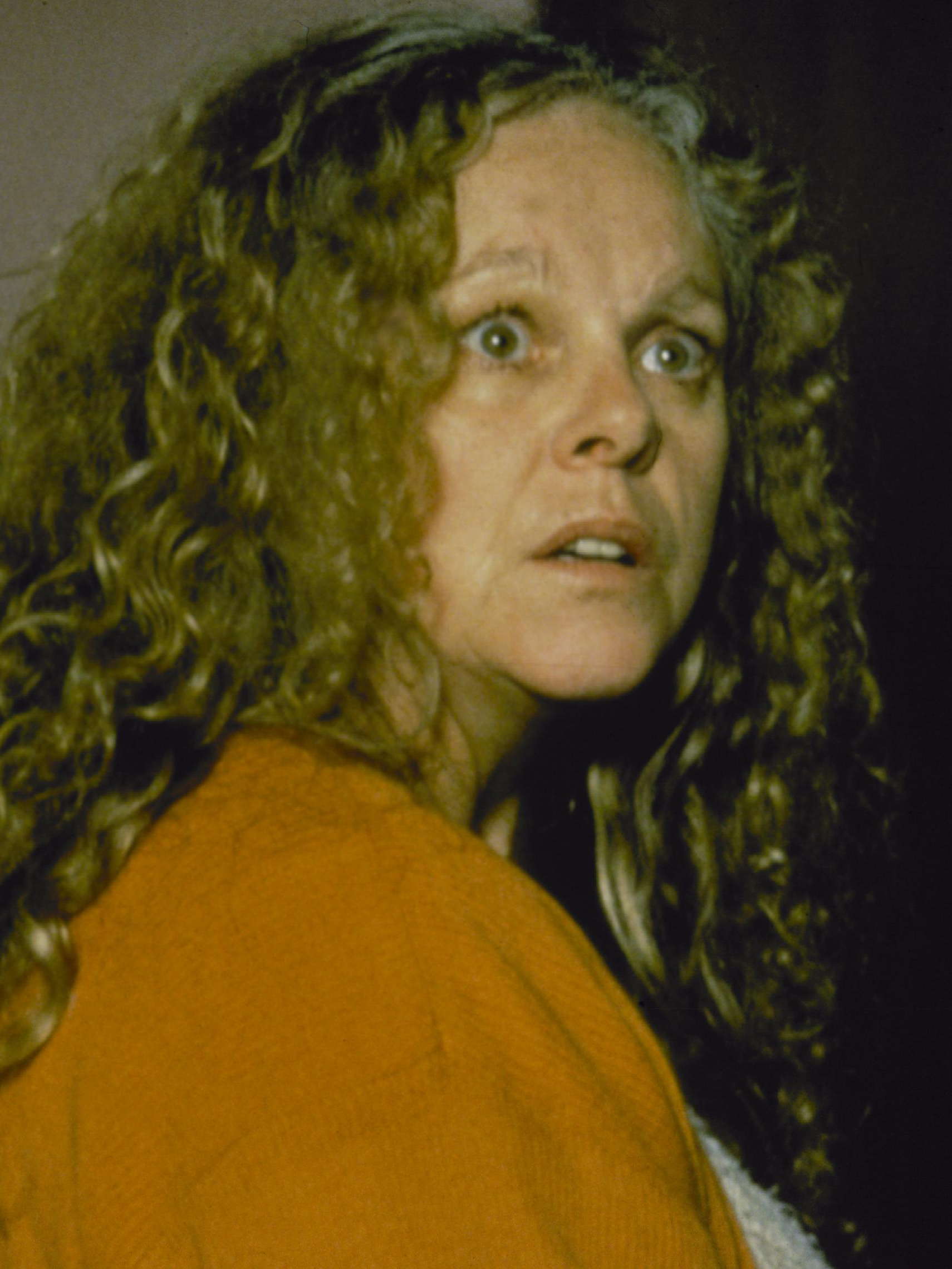
- Curran in 1998
- Born: 1945 (age 80–81); Australia
- Occupation: Actress
- Years active: 1965–present

Lynette Curran is an Australian actress known for many roles in Australian television series and films, including the soap opera Bellbird, and the films Country Town (1971) and Bliss (1985).

== Career ==
=== Theatre ===
She started acting in the theatre in 1964. Theatre work includes The Country Wife, Rookery Nook, Richard II, Just Between Ourselves, and Ashes for the Melbourne Theatre Company. She also played in Steaming for the Seymour Centre in Sydney.

=== Film and television ===
Curran was a cast member of soap opera Bellbird when it started in 1967. She left the series permanently in 1974; at the time she left she was the program's last remaining original cast member.

Curran acted in the film version of the serial Country Town (1971). She made several other film appearances in the 1970s, with roles in sex comedy Alvin Purple (1973), and in dramas I'm Here, Darlings! (1975), Caddie (1976). Late 1970s television appearances include soap opera Number 96 (in 1976), and police procedurals Bluey and Cop Shop. Curran was a recurring cast member of soap opera The Restless Years (1977–1981), playing the scheming Jean Stafford. She won a Sammy Award for her role in Australian Broadcasting Corporation series Spring and Fall.

She co-starred with Barry Otto in the acclaimed 1985 film adaptation of Peter Carey's award-winning novel Bliss.

Other roles include feature films Heatwave (1982), The Delinquents (1989), The Boys (1998), Japanese Story (2003), Somersault (2004), These Final Hours (2013), A Few Less Men (2017) and Brothers' Nest (2018).

For her appearance in Somersault she won the 2004 AACTA award for Best Actress in a Supporting Role.

On television she played Brenda Jackson in the Love My Way, and acted in Underbelly: The Golden Mile and Cleverman. She was in Wentworth as Vera Bennett's elderly, terminally-ill mother (2015).

Curran appears in Season 2 of Aftertaste (2022).

== Filmography ==
=== Film ===
Year	Title	Role	Notes
1971	Country Town	Rhoda Wilson	
1973	Alvin Purple	First Sugar Girl	
1976	Drift Away	unknown role	Short film
1976	Caddie	Maudie	
1980	Buckley's Chance	Doctor's wife	Short film
1982	Heatwave	Evonne Houseman	
1985	Bliss	Bettina Joy	
1986	Bullseye	Dora McKenzie	
1987	Comrades	Prostitute	UK
1987	The Year My Voice Broke	Anne Olson	
1989	The Delinquents	Mrs. Hansen	
1990	Dead to the World	Pearl Elkington	
1990	Swimming	unknown role	Short film
1991	Every Little Breeze	unknown role	Short film
1993	Just Desserts	Mrs. Fullilove	Short film
1995	Mushrooms	Minnie	
1997	Road to Nhill	Margot	
1997	Oscar and Lucinda	Mrs. Ahearn	
1998	The Boys	Sandra Sprague	
1998	Praise	Sexual Health Worker	
1999	Bangers	Mother	Short film
2000	My Mother Frank	Jean	
2003	Japanese Story	Mum	
2004	Somersault	Irene	
2007	Prada Handbag	Meryl	Short film
2009	Boundless	Mother	Short film
2009	Prime Mover	Mrs Boyd	
2013	These Final Hours	James' Mum	
2014	Love Is Now	Nurse	
2014	A Priest In The Family	Molly	Short film
2015	Bluey	Old Woman	Short film
2015	Black Clock	Mrs. Anderson	Short film
2017	A Few Less Men	Maureen	
2018	Brothers' Nest	Mum	
2018	Birdie	unknown role	Short film
2019	Aldi Australia: The Miracle Ham	Beryl	Short film
2021	Shang-Chi And The Legend Of The Ten Rings	Old Lady on Bus	US

=== Television ===
Year	Title	Role	Notes
1965	The Sweet Sad Story of Elmo and Me	Betty	TV movie
1965-70	Homicide	Karen Latimer / Anna / Karen Barratt / Joy Hamilton / Wendy Hamilton	5 episodes
1967-74	Bellbird	Rhoda Lang	1107 episodes
1971-72	Matlock Police	Vicky Thompson / Sandra Hughes	2 episodes
1970-73	Division 4	Kerry Nolan / Wendy Morris	2 episodes
1973	Brumby Innes	May	TV movie
1974	The End Product	Estelle Clay	TV movie
1974	Rush	Amy Draper	Episode: "They Faced All the Dangers, Those Bold Bushrangers"
1974	Eye of the Spiral (aka '’The Spiral Bureau’')		TV movie
1975	Behind the Legend	Belle	Episode: "Tom Roberts"
1975	Cash and Company	Emma Riley	Episode: "Home Brewed"
1975	I'm Here, Darlings!		TV movie
1976	King's Men		Episode: "Pipeline"
1976	Alvin Purple	Fan	Episode: "London Derriere"
1976	Fair Game		TV pilot
1976	Number 96	Samantha Minerver	2 episodes
1976	The Outsiders	Carol	Episode: "Change of Image"
1977	A Journey to the Center of the Earth	Voice	Animated TV movie
1977	Bluey	Jenny	TV series, 1 episode 39: Son of Bluey
1978	The Geeks	Tina	TV movie
1978	Chopper Squad	Cheryl Falconi	Episode: "Cliff Rescue"
1978	Case for the Defence	Angela Craig	Episode: "The Family Way"
1978–1980	The Restless Years	Jean Stafford	TV series
1980	Spring & Fall	Carol	Episode: Cold Comfort
1980–1981	Cop Shop	Trudy Lovell / Shirley Youngman / Marie Wood	6 episodes
1982	The Mike Walsh Show	Guest - Herself with Amanda Muggleton & Gwen Plumb	TV series, 1 episode
1984	Carson's Law	Vanessa Martin	2 episodes
1984–1992	A Country Practice	Connie Barker / Karen Stone / Karen West	5 episodes
1986	The Flying Doctors	Jean Irving	Episode: Million Acre Prison
1987	The Shiralee	Hareema	TV miniseries, 2 episodes
1988	Rafferty's Rules	Dr. Curlewis	TV series, 1 episode: Freedom
1988	Touch the Sun: Peter and Pompey	Connie Driscoll	TV movie
1988	The Dirtwater Dynasty	Our Mum	TV miniseries, 1 episode
1988	Australians	Mrs. Cuthbert	TV series, 1 episode 19: Betty Cuthbert
1988	Stringer	Valerie Gordon	
1989	Becca	Emma	TV movie
1989	Police State	Dawn Parker	TV movie
1993	Death In the Family		TV movie
1995	Echo Point	Angela Tilbury	1 episode
1997	Big Sky	Meg Bateman	Episode: "Lost and Found"
1998	FCTV	Guest	TV series, 1 episode
1998	Aftershocks	Fay Asquith	TV movie
1998–2006	All Saints	Anita Petrakis / Hilary Doyle / Harriet Bell	5 episodes
1998; 2000	Water Rats	Glenda Lord / Geraldine Sawyer	2 episodes
1999–2005	Blue Heelers	Evie Osborn / Marie Biden	3 episodes
2000	Murder Call	Janet Simms	Episode: "Paid in Full"
2001; 2002	Backberner	Miriam Stardwick	2 episodes
2001–03	Always Greener	Connie Linguini	9 episodes
2003	White Collar Blue	Sandra Benson	1 episode
2004-07	Love My Way	Brenda Jackson	28 episodes
2006	Call Me Mum	Dellmay	TV movie
2009	Chandon Pictures	Lorelei	Episode: "The Man with the Dancing Fingers"
2010	Wicked Love: the Maria Korp Story	Daphne	TV movie
2010	Underbelly: The Golden Mile	Irene Webb	2 episodes
2010	City Homicide	Posy Pollard	1 episode
2010	Rake	Colleen	1 episode
2011	Bed of Roses	Frida Fryberg	3 episodes
2011	Slide	Connie	1 episode
2013-14	Wentworth	Rita Bennett	3 episodes
2015	Glitch	Jo Willis	1 episode
2016	Cleverman	Virgil	2 episodes
2016	Deep Water	Rhys' Mother	2 episodes
2017	Newton's Law	Martha Payne	1 episode
2018	Harrow	Millicent Bruce	1 episode
2019	Molly and Cara	Molly	
2020	Reckoning	Kitty	Episode: "You Should Be Dancing"
2022	Aftertaste	June	6 episodes
2023	Queen of Oz	Sylvia	3 episodes

== Theatre ==
Year	Title	Role	Notes
1965	The Sweet Sad Story of Elmo and Me	Betty	ABC TV Studios
1969	The Imaginary Invalid	Toinette	Theatre Royal
1969	The Country Wife		Russell Street Theatre & Canberra Theatre with MTC
1969	A Long View		Russell Street Theatre with MTC
1969	Six Characters in Search of an Author		Russell Street Theatre with MTC
1969	Rookery Nook		Russell Street Theatre with MTC
1971	Customs and Excise		Nimrod
1972	Brumby Innes		Pram Factory with Australian Performing Group
1976	Martello Towers	Francesca Jones	Nimrod
1976	The Recruiting Officer	Melinda, an Heiress	Nimrod
1976	Rookery Nook	Rhoda Marley	UNSW with Old Tote Theatre for Sydney Festival
1977	The Mind with the Dirty Man	DivIna	Metro Theatre, Sydney
1977	Ashes	Anne	Russell Street Theatre with MTC
1978	Richard III	Lady Anne Neville	Melbourne Athenaeum with MTC
1978	The Beaux' Stratagem	Cherry	Melbourne Athenaeum with MTC
1978	Just Between Ourselves	Pam	Russell Street Theatre with MTC
1978	Under Milk Wood		Melbourne Athenaeum with MTC
1978	Arsenic and Old Lace	Elaine Harper	Melbourne Athenaeum
1979	The Day After the Fair	Anna	Comedy Theatre, Melbourne & Theatre Royal, Sydney
1980	The Sunny South	Bubs Berkley	Sydney Opera House with STC for Sydney Festival
1980	Sexual Perversity in Chicago / Reunion	Carol	Nimrod
1981	Every Burglar Has a Silver Lining		Seymour Centre
1981	La Veniexiana		Seymour Centre
1982	A Woman Alone		Nimrod
1982-83	Steaming		Sydney Opera House, Seymour Centre, Theatre Royal, Comedy Theatre, Melbourne & Canberra Theatre
1982	Medea		Nimrod
1982	Female Parts		Nimrod
1982	The Importance of Being Earnest	Hon. Gwendolen Fairfax	Marian Street Theatre
1984	Two		Marian Street Theatre
1985-86	The Real Thing		SGIO Theatre, Brisbane for QTC & Playhouse Adelaide
1985	The Resistible Rise of Arturo Ui		Seymour Centre with Nimrod
1986	Dreams in an Empty City		Playhouse Adelaide with STCSA
1988	Citizen of the Year		Playhouse, Perth with WATC
1989	The Real Matilda		Bay Street Theatre
1989	Lipstick Dreams		Playhouse, Newcastle with New England Theatre Company, Hunter Valley Theatre Company & Australian Elizabethan Theatre Trust
1990	Hot Fudge and Icecream		Wharf Theatre with STC
1990	Words of One Syllable		Belvoir Street Theatre
1991	The Boys	Sandra Sprague	Stables Theatre with Griffin Theatre Company
1991	Racing Demon		Wharf Theatre with STC
1991	The Killing of Sister George		Q Theatre
1991	Three Stories High - Julia's Song / Painted Woman / Koori Love		Belvoir Street Theatre
1992	Diving for Pearls		Canberra Theatre, Bridge Theatre, Coniston, Riverina Playhouse
1992	Steaming		Adelaide
1992	Wet and Dry		Stables Theatre with Griffin Theatre Company
1993	A Prayer for Wings		Lookout Theatre, Woollahra
1993	Mesmerized		Stables Theatre with Griffin Theatre Company
1993	Aftershocks		Belvoir Street Theatre
1993	In Relation to Inadmissable Evidence		Belvoir Street Theatre
1995	The Last Yankee		Ensemble Theatre
1995	The Real Thing		Marian Street Theatre
1996	Bold Girls		Belvoir Street Theatre
1998	The Boys		Sydney
1998	Tilly's Turn		Stables Theatre
1999	Pride and Prejudice		Sydney Opera House with STC & MTC
2000	Suddenly Last Summer	Mrs Holly	Belvoir Street Theatre
2001	Fireface		Wharf Theatre with STC for Sydney Festival
2001	The Laramie Project		Belvoir Street Theatre
2001	The School for Scandal		Sydney Opera House with STC
2002	All My Sons	Kate	Sydney Opera House with Ensemble Theatre
2002	Presence		Stables Theatre with Griffin Theatre Company
2003	Broken Glass	Sylvia Gellburg	Ensemble Theatre
2005	The Chairs	Petty Pie	Belvoir Street Theatre
2005	Colder Than Here		Belvoir Street Theatre
2007	The Gates of Egypt	Clarice	Belvoir Street Theatre
2007	Derrida In Love	Jacqueline	Ensemble Theatre
2009	The Crucible	Tituba / Mary Lewis / Rebecca Nurse	Wharf Theatre with STC
2011	Gross und Klein (Big and Small)		STC
2012	Gross und Klein (Big and Small)		European tour - Théâtre de la Ville, Barbican Theatre, London, Vienna Festival & Ruhrfestspiele with STC
2013	Cat on a Hot Tin Roof	Big Mama	Theatre Royal with Belvoir Street Theatre
2014	Hedda Gabler	Aunt Julie	Belvoir Street Theatre
2016	The Great Fire	Mary	Belvoir Street Theatre
2019	I'm With Her	Dr Marion Blackwell	Darlinghurst Theatre Company
2020	Cursed!		Belvoir Street Theatre

== Awards and nominations ==
Year	Nominated work	Award	Result
	Spring and Fall	Sammy Award	Won
1985	Bliss	AFI Award for Best Actress in a Lead Role	Nominated
1998	The Boys	AFI Award for Best Actress in a Leading Role	Nominated
1999	The Boys	Film Critics Circle of Australia (FCCA) Award for Best Female Supporting Actor	Won
2004	Somersault	AACTA Award for Best Actress in a Supporting Role	Won
2004	Somersault	Film Critics Circle of Australia (FCCA) Award for Best Female Supporting Actor	Won
2007	Call Me Mum	AFI Award for Best Guest or Supporting Actress in a Television Drama	Nominated
2019	Brother's Nest	Australian Film Critics Association (AFCA) Award for Best Supporting Actress	Nominated
2023	Aftertaste	Equity Ensemble Award for Outstanding Performance by an Ensemble in a Comedy Series	Nominated

== Personal life ==
Curran was married when she was 19, but the marriage was short-lived. She has had two substantial relationships since then, but bore no children. She lives alone in Sydney. A sexual assault and incest survivor, Curran is estranged from her family.

Curran has Indigenous Australian heritage, as she discovered two of her great-grandmothers were Aboriginal.

She dabbles as a medium, which she got into after foreseeing the death of a friend in a car accident. She first had premonitions as a child. She offers readings at Sydney markets, using tarot cards, numerology and astrology.

Curran is often mistaken for good friend and fellow Australian actress Jacki Weaver, whom she has previously worked with, most notably in the 2008 Ensemble Theatre production of Derrida In Love.
