= Top Mates =

- Genre: mini-series
- Written by: Anne Brooksbank; Margaret Kelly
- Directed by: Chris Thomson
- Starring: Michael McGlinchey; Patrick Matthews
- Country of origin: Australia
- Original language: English
- No. of episodes: 5

Production
- Producer: Noel Price
- Running time: 1 x 1 hour, 4 x 30 min

Original release
- Network: ABC
- Release: 16 July – 20 July 1979

Top Mates is a 1979 Australian TV mini-series.

== Synopsis ==
The series centres on two boys, Paul Jackson and Brett Towers. Paul starts attending a new school, where he meets Brett, and both run away from school. Also featured are Liz Towers and her best friend Rachel Marsh and the boys schoolmate Tony Fabiani.

== Cast ==
- Michael McGlinchey as Brett Towers
- Patrick Matthews as Paul Jackson
- Angela Gauci as Liz Towers
- Justine Saunders as Mrs. Jackson
- Candy Williams as Mr. Jackson
- Tessa Mallos as Mrs. Towers
- Ray Meagher as Mr. Towers
- John Ewart as the derro
- Bronwyn Clarke
- Kelly Dingwall

== Production ==
The script was written by Anne Brooksbank and Margaret Kelly, and the series was made by ABC Television.

== Release ==
It was aired by the ABC in Australia in 1979, and on BBC TV in the UK in 1989.

== Reception ==
Top Mates won a Sammy Award and a Penguin Award.

Looking back at the series, Jill Morris of The Age said the series saw "modern issues met head-on".
