= The Fremantle Conspiracy =

- Based on: idea by Thomas Keneally
- Written by: John Misto
- Directed by: Chris Langman
- Starring: Nikki Coghill; Bernard Hill; Lloyd Morris; Richard Moir; Rod Mullinar
- Country of origin: Australia
- Original language: English
- No. of episodes: 2 x 2 hours

Production
- Producer: Harley Manners
- Budget: $4.5 million

Original release
- Network: Seven Network
- Release: 26 January 1992

The Fremantle Conspiracy is a 1992 Australian mini series based on the 1876 escape by some Fenians from Fremantle Gaol.

== Cast ==
- Nikki Coghill as Hanna
- Bernard Hill as Breslin
- Lloyd Morris as John O'Reilly
- Richard Moir as Hogan
- Kelly Dingwall as Sean
- Rod Mullinar
- Bob Baines
