= Point of No Return (1995 film) =

- Directed by: Vincent Monton
- Written by: Vincent Monton
- Produced by: Phillip Emanuel; John Hipwell executive: David Hannay
- Starring: Marcus Graham; Nikki Coghill
- Production company: Phillip Emanuel Productions
- Distributed by: Roadshow (video) (1996)
- Release date: 1995
- Country: Australia
- Language: English
- Budget: $500,000

Point of No Return is a 1995 Australian film about an ex soldier who escapes from prison to investigate his brother's murder.

== Cast ==
- Marcus Graham as Grady / Christian
- Nikki Coghill as Kate Maguire
