= Calamity (film) =

- Directed by: Vera Chytilová
- Starring: Bolek Polívka; Dagmar Bláhová
- Edited by: Jiří Brožek
- Release date: 1 January 1982
- Running time: 1h 36min
- Country: Czechoslovakia
- Language: Czech

Calamity (Czech: Kalamita) is a 1982 Czechoslovak comedy film directed by Vera Chytilová.

== Cast ==
- Bolek Polívka - Honza Dostál
- Dagmar Bláhová - Majka
- Jana Synková - Primárka
- Marie Pavlíková - Bábicka
- Jaroslava Kretschmerová - Kveta
- Zdeněk Svěrák - Ucitel
- Václav Svorc - Nácelník
- Bronislav Poloczek - Rezník
- Václav Helsus - Strojvedoucí
- Zdeněk Dítě - Lesník
