= Buddies (1983 film) =

- Directed by: Arch Nicholson
- Written by: John Dingwall
- Produced by: John Dingwall
- Starring: Colin Friels; Kris McQuade; Harold Hopkins
- Cinematography: David Eggby
- Edited by: Martyn Down
- Music by: Chris Neal
- Distributed by: Hoyts (AUS); Paramount Pictures (Worldwide)
- Release dates: 23 June 1983 (AUS); 15 July 1983 (USA)
- Running time: 97 minutes
- Country: Australia
- Language: English
- Budget: A$1.9 million
- Box office: A$81,777

Buddies is a 1983 Australian comedy/drama film directed by Arch Nicholson and written by John Dingwall.

== Plot ==
Young miners Mike (Colin Friels) and Johnny (Harold Hopkins) work in the gem fields of central Queensland around Emerald. Conflict arises when their pick-and-shovel operation is threatened by a large-scale bulldozer operator, Andy (Dennis Miller). Help arrives from a city doctor, George (Norman Kaye) and his family, who are passing though on holiday, and a pilot, Alfred (Simon Chilvers), who sells them a plane. The group band together against Andy, but Mike and Johnny argue over strategy and compete for the doctor’s daughter Jennifer's affections (Lisa Peers).

== Cast ==
- Colin Friels as Mike
- Harold Hopkins as Johnny
- Kris McQuade as Stella
- Simon Chilvers as Alfred
- Norman Kaye as George
- Lisa Peers as Jennifer
- Bruce Spence as Ted
- Andrew Sharp as Peter
- Dinah Shearing as Merle
- Dennis Miller as Andy

== Production ==
John Dingwall wrote the script and decided to produce it himself. He raised the money with the help of Rex Pilbeam, a former mayor of Rockhampton. Most of the money was raised in Queensland, including investment from the Queensland Film Corporation. Shooting took place on location in Emerald, Queensland and lasted six weeks.

== Release ==
According to Dingwall, the film tested extremely well with audiences but there was a difficulty in marketing it. The film was not a great success in 1983, as no Australian distributor wanted to release it, but Dingwall took it around the country's cinemas himself, where it was well received.

Buddies grossed $81,777 at the box office in Australia, which is equivalent to $215,891 in 2009 dollars.

== Awards and nominations ==
Year	Award	Category	Result	Ref.
1983	AFI Awards	Best Achievement in Sound	Nominated	
1983	AFI Awards	Best Actor in a Supporting Role (Simon Chilvers	Nominated	
1983	AFI Awards	Best Actress in a Lead Role (Kris McQuade)	Nominated	
1983	AFI Awards	Best Original Music Score (Chris Neal)	Nominated	
1983	AFI Awards	AFI Award for Best Original Screenplay (John Dingwall)	Won	

== See also ==
- Cinema of Australia
