= Displaced Persons (film) =

- Written by: Louis Nowra
- Directed by: Geoffrey Nottage
- Starring: John Wood
- Country of origin: Australia
- Original languages: English; Czech; Polish; Hungarian; German; Italian

Production
- Producer: Jan Chapman
- Running time: 75 minutes

Original release
- Network: ABC
- Release: 1985

Displaced Persons is a 1985 Australian TV movie about refugees arriving in Australia in 1945. It was the fourth episode on 1985's Sunday Australian Movies series.

It was the first script written by Louis Nowra, who was inspired by a book he read about displaced people in Australia after World War Two. He wrote it in three days and sent it to the ABC who agreed to make it.

The movie was well received and Nowra went on to write a number of works for the ABC.

In the Age's Green Guide Maria McNamara says that it was the best of the series so far. She notes that previous episodes "lacked guts" but this one "does not lack guts. It is raw, formidable and eerie. In short, it is very, very good."

== Cast ==
- John Wood as Dr Thomas
- Dagmar Bláhová as Anna
- Steven Vidler as Alexander
- Annie Byron as Nurse Evans
- Urszula Golka as Teresa
- Joseph Spano as Frederico
- Eva Sitta as Annette
- John Orcsik as Miklos
