= Kelly Dingwall =

Australian actor

- Born: ~1964 or ~1966; Rockhampton, Queensland, Australia
- Other names: Kelly Dale
- Occupation: Actor
- Years active: 1979–1997
- Notable work: Raw Nerve; The Custodian; Secret Valley; Home and Away
- Children: 1
- Family: John Dingwall

Kelly Dale Dingwall (born 23 September 1966) is an Australian former actor. He is known for his roles as Brian 'Dodge' Forbes in the soap opera Home and Away, and a rookie reporter Tony Reynolds in the 1993 mystery thriller film The Custodian.

== Early life ==
Dingwall is the son of scriptwriters John Dingwall and Margaret Kelly. He is the oldest of five children.

His family travelled around Australia for work, which meant Dingwall changed schools often. At the age of 11, he attended a writing workshop and wrote a children's play. The play was subsequently picked up by Australian television and he starred it.

== Career ==
After appearing in miniseries Top Mates in 1979, Dingwall took on the regular role of Spider McGlurk (leader of the Spider gang) in children's adventure series Secret Valley from 1980 to 1983. He appeared in several miniseries including The Challenge (1986) and Vietnam (1987), starring Nicole Kidman in an early role. He also had guest roles in soap operas E Street and A Country Practice as well as police procedural series Police Rescue.

Dingwall's film roles during this time included playing Barry in 1987 coming-of-age drama The Year My Voice Broke, alongside Ben Mendelsohn and Noah Taylor, and Eddie in 1988 comedy Around the World in 80 Ways. He also featured in a 1987 stage production of I'm Not Rappaport at Sydney Opera House.

In 1989, Dingwall landed the regular role of antagonist Brian 'Dodge' Forbes in long-running soap opera Home and Away and in 1990, he played David in the film Raw Nerve. That same year, he left Home and Away, adopted the stage name 'Kelly Dale' and relocated to the UK to further his acting career.

In 1993, Dingwall played the role of Tony Reynolds in mystery thriller The Custodian, written and directed by his father John Dingwall and starring Hugo Weaving, Anthony La Paglia, Barry Otto and Essie Davis, with Naomi Watts in an early role. In 1995, he resumed the role of Dodge in Home and Away, until the character was killed off. He next had a recurring role as police diver Senior-Constable Sam Bailey in Water Rats in 1997, and a starring guest role in an episode of drama series Big Sky. He officially retired from the industry.

== Personal life ==
Dingwall met his wife Kristin, a casting consultant, on the set of 1993 film The Custodian. In January 1996, they were married and 18 months later in 1997, they had a daughter.

== Filmography ==
=== Film ===
Year	Title	Role	Notes	Ref.
1985	The Empty Beach	Head Punk		
1987	The Year My Voice Broke	Barry		
1988	Around the World in 80 Ways	Eddie Davis		
1988	The First Kangaroos	Jim Devereux		
1988	Vicious! (aka To Make a Killing)	Benny		
1990	Raw Nerve	David		
1993	The Custodian	Tony Reynolds		

=== Television ===
Year	Title	Role	Notes	Ref.
1979	Top Mates		Miniseries	
1980–1983	Secret Valley	Spider McGlurk	13 episodes	
1983; 1985; 1991	A Country Practice	Wayne Bailey / Ross Thompson / Robert McNichol	6 episodes	
1986	The Challenge	Damian Fewster	Miniseries, 2 episodes	
1986	I Own the Racecourse		TV film	
1986	Double Sculls	Experimental Subject #1	TV film	
1987	Vietnam	Serge's flatmate	Miniseries, 1 episode	
1987; 1989	Rafferty's Rules	Billy / Shane Stevens	2 episodes	
1988	The Fremantle Conspiracy	Sean	Miniseries	
1989	E Street	Kevin 'Lucky' Johns	4 episodes	
1989; 1995	Home and Away	Brian 'Dodge' Forbes	68 episodes	
1990	Shadows of the Heart	Andy Keegan	Miniseries, 2 episodes	
1991	Police Rescue	Dylan	1 episode	
1991	The Miraculous Mellops	Attendant	1 episode	
1991	Heroes II: The Return	Able Seaman Walter 'Poppa' Falls	Miniseries, 2 episodes	
1994	G.P.	Simon Bennet	1 episode	
1996	Whipping Boy	Dismal	TV film	
1997	Big Sky	Mac McLoughlin	Episode: "Mac's Time"	
1997	Water Rats	Sam Bailey	9 episodes	

== Theatre ==
Year	Title	Role	Notes	Ref.
1984	Torch Song Trilogy	Understudy for David & Alan	York Theatre, Sydney, Universal Theatre, Melbourne, Her Majesty's Theatre, Sydney, National Theatre, Melbourne with J. C. Williamson's	
1987	I'm Not Rappaport		Sydney Opera House	
