= Scales of Justice (miniseries) =

- Written by: Robert Caswell
- Directed by: Michael Jenkins
- Country of origin: Australia
- Original language: English
- No. of episodes: 3

Production
- Producer: Michael Carson
- Running time: 227 mins

Original release
- Network: ABC
- Release: 20 September – 4 October 1983

Scales of Justice is an Australian crime drama miniseries directed by Michael Jenkins. It first screened on the Australian Broadcasting Corporation in 1983. It was one of the most controversial Australian mini-series ever produced, examining corruption in all levels of law enforcement.

Scales of Justice is composed of three self-contained, character-linked dramas. Focusing on the world of Australian law enforcement, vice, drugs, politics and widespread corruption, from street level to the corridors of power, the programme was acclaimed for its a near-documentary level of realism. Robert Caswell, the writer of the series, expressed surprise at the criticism it received from police and press.

It was released on DVD in 2005, with a 227 minutes running time.

== Act One — The Job ==
While investigating a break-in, Probationary Constable Leonard "Spider" Webber witnesses his senior officer stealing merchandise and is torn between loyalty to his team and his own conscience.

=== Cast ===
- Simon Burke as Probationary Constable Leonard "Spider" Webber
- John Hargreaves as Constable Borland
- Bill Hunter as Sergeant O'Rourke
- Isabelle Anderson as Constable Callahan

== Act Two — The Game ==
Detective Sergeants Ken Draffin and Mike Miles allow their integrity to be compromised by big-time criminal "Nipper" Jackson.

=== Cast ===
- Dennis Miller as Detective Sergeant Ken Draffin
- Tim Robertson as Detective Sergeant Mick Miles
- Tony Barry as Garth "Nipper" Jackson
- Don Reid as Assistant Commissioner Phillip Thompson
- Brian McDermott as Police Minister Ralph Carpenter

== Act Three — The Numbers ==
A young attorney general's actions bring him into conflict with police, senior politicians and major crime bosses.

=== Cast ===
- Nick Tate as Glenn Ferris, the State Attorney General
- Richard Meikle as Russell Cooper, the State Premier
- John Meillon as Barry Barnes, the Deputy State Premier
- Kris McQuade as Kate Hardman
- Max Cullen as Arthur Roach
- Frank Wilson as Sir John Ritchie
- Antoinette Byron as Prostitute
- Diane Craig as Meredith

NOTE: Don Reid's character, Asst. Commissioner Phillip Thompson is the only character to appear in every episode, while Det. Sgt. Draffin (Dennis Miller), Det. Sgt. Miles (Tim Robertson) and Police Minister Ralph Carpenter (Brian McDermott) are the only central characters to appear in at least 2 episodes.

== Reception ==
Upon release the series received backlash as it was thought that the series portrayed the New South Wales Police Department in an unfavourable light. The series highlights the potential for corruption to enter the lower levels of government.

== See also ==
- List of Australian television series
