= Raw Nerve (1990 film) =

- Directed by: Tony Wellington
- Written by: Tony Wellington
- Produced by: Michael Lynch
- Starring: Rebecca Rigg; Kelly Dingwall; John Polson
- Production companies: Lynchpin and Tosh; Australian Film Commission; Fyodawn
- Distributed by: Valhalla Films (theatrical); Hoyts Australia (video)
- Release date: 1990
- Running time: 91 mins
- Country: Australia
- Language: English
- Budget: $425,000

Raw Nerve is a 1990 Australian film directed by Tony Wellington and starring Rebecca Rigg, Kelly Dingwall, and John Polson. The plot concerns three teenagers who rob a house.

== Cast ==
- Kelly Dingwall as David
- Rebecca Rigg as Michelle
- John Polson as Billy
- Barry Leane as John Weatherby
- Jan Kingrose as Miriam Weatherby
- Kate Reid as Policewoman
- Sylvia Coleman as Neighbor

== Production ==
The film was mostly financed by the Australian Film Commission. It was shot over fifteen days, although the three leads rehearsed for three weeks.

== Reception ==
The film received some strong reviews.
