= Pig in a Poke =

- Genre: Miniseries
- Written by: John Dingwall; Margaret Kelly
- Directed by: Michael Jenkins; Brian Bell
- Starring: Paul Mason; Justine Saunders
- Country of origin: Australia
- Original language: English
- No. of episodes: 6

Production
- Running time: 75 mins

Original release
- Network: ABC
- Release: 24 July – 21 August 1977

Pig in a Poke is a 1977 Australian series about a Melbourne doctor who moves to Redfern. There was a 1974 one-off drama, and a subsequent series of five episodes in 1977.

It stars Paul Mason as a doctor who buys a medical practice sight unseen and Justine Saunders as his receptionist and nurse. The first episode explored domestic violence and the need for women's refuges. Other episodes look at Greek family traditions, transgender women and the way laws are applied differently for blacks and whites.

== Cast ==
- Paul Mason as Dr Peter Reynolds
- Justine Saunders as Maureen
- Chris King as Billy Hodge (1974 pilot)
- Pat Evison as Mrs Hodge (1974 pilot)
- Julie Dawson as Mary (ep 1. "The Ginny Story")
- Tony Barry (ep 1. "The Ginny Story")
- Tessa Mallos as Christina Moustakas (ep 2. "Theo's Story", ep 3. Christina's Story)
- Arianthe Galani as Adriana (ep 2. "Theo's Story")
- John Hargreaves (ep 4. "Ray's Story")
- Neil Fitzpatrick (ep 5. "Lisa's Story")
- Gordon Glenwright (ep 5. "Lisa's Story")
- Holly Brown (ep 5. "Lisa's Story")
- Jackie Munro (ep 5. "Lisa's Story")
- Ray Meagher (ep 5. "Lisa's Story")

== Accolades ==
1975 Logie Awards

- Best Individual Performance By An Actress - Pat Evison

1977 Penguin Awards

- Best Supporting Actress - Arianthe Galani (ep Theo's Story)
- Best Script Writer - John Dingwall and Margaret Kelly (ep. The Ginny Story)

1977 AWGIE Award

- Best Original Work for TV - Margaret Kelly and John Dingwall (ep. Theo's Story)

1978 Logie Awards

- Best Individual Performance by an Actor - Neil Fitzpatrick (ep Lisa's Story)
- Best Dramatic Script - John Dingwall and Margaret Kelly
