= Gosia Dobrowolska =

Polish-born Australian actress

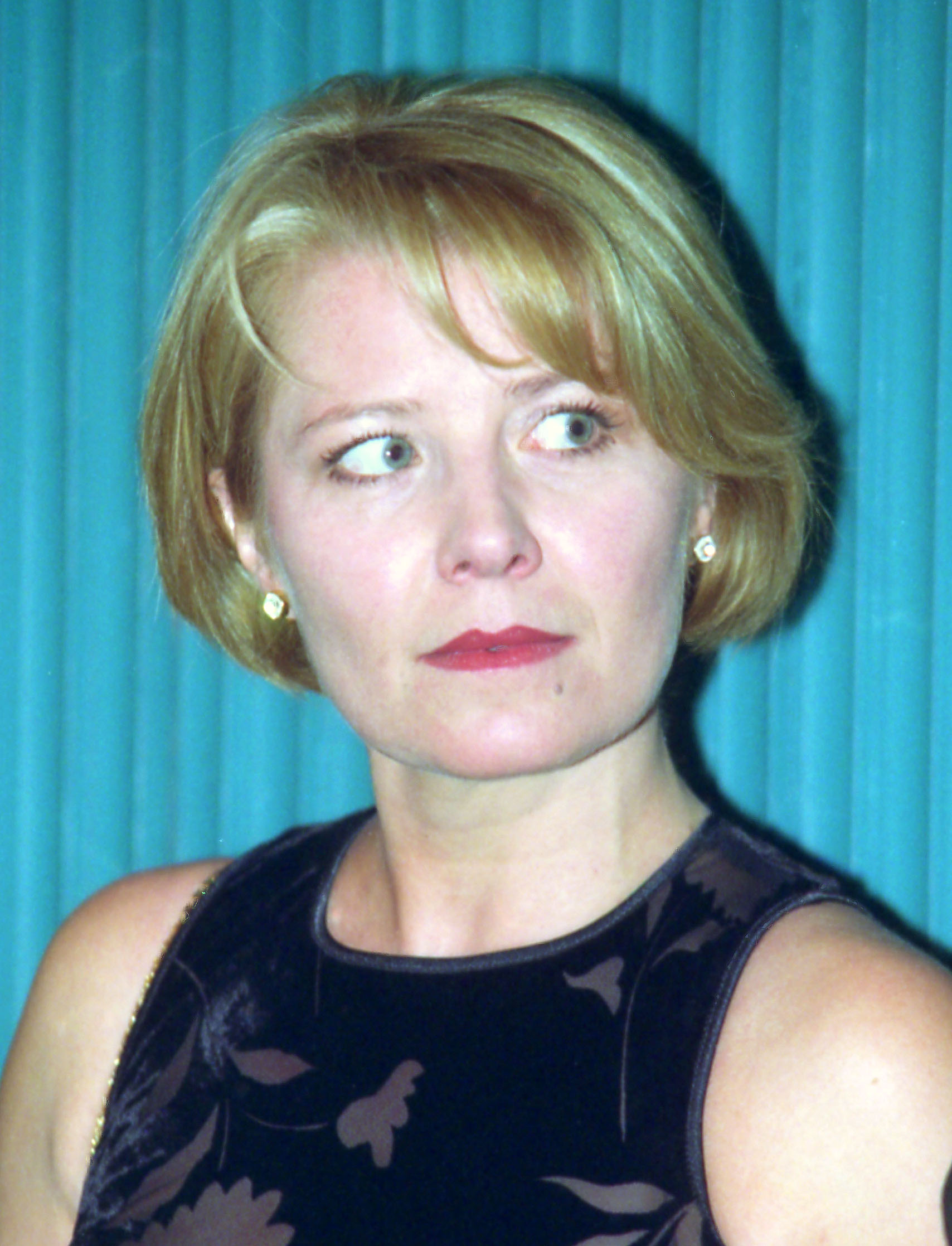
- Dobrowolska in 1999
- Born: Małgorzata Dobrowolska; 2 June 1958 (age 68); Kamienna Gora, Poland
- Occupation: Actress

Gosia Dobrowolska (born Małgorzata Dobrowolska, 2 June 1958, in Kamienna Góra), is a Polish-born Australian actress.

== Biography ==
She has one brother, Janusz Dobrowolski, who also made a minor appearance in the 1984 film, Silver City.

Dobrowolska left Poland in 1981 and arrived in Australia in 1983 with her then husband Bogdan Koca. Her first Australian film was Silver City, where she played a Polish immigrant.

Paul Cox specifically wrote the 1991 film A Woman's Tale for Sheila Florance. Directed by Cox, Dobrowolska plays a nurse who befriends an elderly woman (Florance) dying of cancer.

== Filmography ==
=== Film ===
Year	Film	Role	Type
1981	Dreszcze (aka Shivers)	Malgosia	Feature film
1984	Silver City	Nina	Feature film
1986	The Surfer	Gina	Feature film
1987	Around the World in 80 Ways	Nurse Ophelia Cox	Feature film
1988	Phobia	Renata Simmons	Feature film
1990	Golden Braid	Terese	Feature film
1991	A Woman's Tale	Anna	Feature film
1992	The Nun and the Bandit	Sister Lucy	Feature film
1992	Careful	Zenaida	Feature film
1992	Resistance	Mrs. Wilson	Feature film
1993	The Custodian	Josie	Feature film
1993	Touch Me	Sarah	Film short
1994	Exile	Midwife	Feature film
1996	Lust and Revenge	Cecilia Applebaum	Feature film
1999	A Week in the Life of a Man	Anna Borowski	Feature film
2005	Doskonale popoludine	Maria Mielczarek	Feature film
2009	Defect	Marie	Film short
2011	On Borrowed Time	Herself	Feature film documentary
2014	Obywatel	Younger Jan's Mother	Feature film

=== Television ===
Year	Film	Role	Type
1984	City West	Nada Stankovic	TV series, 7 episodes
1984	The Mike Walsh Show	Guest - Herself	TV series, 1 episode
1984	Special Squad		TV series, 1 episode
1987	Rafferty's Rules	Maz	TV series, 1 episode
1987	I've Come About the Suicide	Genevieve Lawson	TV film
1987	Willing and Abel		TV series, 1 episode
1988	Fields of Fire II	Basia	TV miniseries, 2 episodes
1988; 1994	The Midday Show	Herself (with John Dingwall)	TV series, 1 episode
1988-89	A Country Practice	Marianna Kubik	TV series, 5 episodes
1989	Fields of Fire III	Basia	TV miniseries, 2 episodes
1990	Mission: Impossible	Alina	TV series, Season 2, episode 7: "Target Earth"
1990	Sunday	Guest	TV series, 1 episode
1991	The Great Air Race (aka Half A World Away)	Thea Rasche	TV miniseries, 2 episodes
1991	Tonight Live with Steve Vizard	Guest	TV series, 1 episode
1992	G.P.	Eve Walenska	TV series, 1 episode
1992	Kevin Rampenbacker and the Electric Kettle		TV film
1992	Big Ideas	Anna Novak	TV film
1993	Seven Deadly Sins		TV series, episode: Greed
1994	Midday with Derryn Hinch	Guest	TV series, 1 episode
1994	Review	Guest Presenter	TV series, 1 episode
1995	English at Work	Herself	TV series, 1 episode: "Continence"
1995	Banjo Paterson's The Man from Snowy River (aka Snowy River: The McGregor Saga)	Svetlana Koromanskaya	TV series, 1 episode
1995	Spellbinder		TV series, 1 episode
1996	Erotic Tales		TV series, 1 episode
1997	The Hidden Dimension	Claire	Short film documentary
1997	Murder Call	Vida Kristov	TV series, 1 episode
1998	Never Tell Me Never	Nurse Anne	TV film
1999; 2006	All Saints	Greta Patterson / Vera / Lillian Gehler	TV series, 3 episodes
1999	The Movie Show	Guest	TV series, 1 episode
2011	East West 101	Yelena	TV series, 1 episode
2020	The End	Mrs. Bogdanowicz	TV series, 3 episodes
2020	The Secrets She Keeps	Anna Nowak	TV series, 1 episode

== Stage ==
Year	Title	Role	Company
1986	Hamlet		Space Theatre, Adelaide, Sydney Opera House
1986	The Marriage		Space Theatre, Adelaide, Sydney Opera House
1987	The Poet Assassinated		The Performance Space, Sydney
1989	Karamazov		Crossroads Theatre, Sydney
1995	Tongue of Stone		
1996	Pentecost		Wharf Theatre, Sydney
1997	The Stronger / Grushenka	Director	Belvoir Street Theatre
1997	The Promised Land : Tinsel and Ashes / Feast		Bondi Pavilion
2004	Stone Sleeper		Lennox Theatre, Parramatta

== Sources ==
- Stratton, D. (1990) The Avocado Plantation: Boom and Bust in the Australian Film Industry, Pan MacMillan: Sydney.
