= Michael Jenkins (director) =

Australian writer, producer and director

- Born: 1946
- Died: 4 March 2024 (aged 77)
- Occupations: Writer, producer, director

Michael Jenkins (1946 – 4 March 2024) was an Australian writer, producer and film and television director.

== Career ==
Jenkins was the creator of the crime drama television series Scales of Justice, Blue Murder and Wildside, all of which deal with corruption in the New South Wales police force. He also directed the cult film The Heartbreak Kid, its spin-off series Heartbreak High, and served as a producer for the latter's 2022 reboot of the same name.

Jenkins was one of the most highly regarded Australian directors of the 1990s, known for his distinctive, gritty style, particularly for his use of multiple hand-held cameras and semi-improvised dialogue.

Jenkins garnered controversy in 2007, when he was announced as the director of The Wrong Girl, a film about the Sydney gang rapes in 2000, written with Nicholas Hammond. The film ceased production after criticism from Premier Morris Iemma and Deputy Premier John Watkins.

Jenkins was diagnosed with Parkinson's disease in 2020, and died on 4 March 2024, at the age of 77.

== Filmography ==
=== Film ===
Year	Title	Director	Writer
1983	Careful, He Might Hear You	No	Yes
1985	Robbery Under Arms	No	Yes
1985	Rebel	Yes	Yes
1988	Emerald City	Yes	No
1991	Sweet Talker	Yes	No
1993	The Heartbreak Kid	Yes	Yes

=== Television ===
Year	Title	Director	Writer	Creator	Notes
1967–1973	Bellbird	Yes	No	No	
1972	Quartet	No	Yes	No	
1973–1975	Certain Women	Yes	No	No	
1973	Serpent in the Rainbow	No	Yes	No	4 episodes
1975	I'm Here, Darlings!	Yes	No	No	TV movie; Also producer
1976	Rush	Yes	No	No	4 episodes
1977	Pig in a Poke	Yes	No	No	
1979	Bailey's Bird	Yes	Yes	No	Pilot episode
1979	One Day, Miller	Yes	No	No	
1980	Young Ramsay	No	Yes	No	1 episode
1980	Water Under the Bridge	No	Yes	No	8 episodes
1980–1982	Spring and Fall	Yes	Yes	No	2 episodes
1981	Menotti	No	Yes	No	1 episode
1983	Scales of Justice	Yes	No	Yes	3 episodes
1986	The Gillies Republic	Yes	No	No	6 episodes
1986	Shark's Paradise	Yes	No	No	TV movie
1988	The Dirtwater Dynasty	Yes	Yes	No	5 episodes
1992	The Leaving of Liverpool	Yes	No	No	2 episodes
1994–1997	Heartbreak High	Yes	No	Yes	2 episodes
1995	Blue Murder	Yes	No	Yes	2 episodes
1997–1999	Wildside	Yes	No	Yes	2 episodes
2002	Young Lions	Yes	No	Yes	3 episodes
2017	Blue Murder: Killer Cop	Yes	No	Yes	2 episodes
