= Emerging (film) =

- Written by: Max Richards
- Directed by: Kathy Mueller
- Starring: Shane Connor; Sue Jones
- Music by: Keijo Sanduik
- Country of origin: Australia
- Original language: English

Production
- Producer: Keith Wilkes
- Cinematography: Chris Davis
- Editor: Rui De Sousa
- Running time: 75 mins
- Production company: ABC

Original release
- Release: 20 October 1985

Emerging is a 1985 Australian TV movie about a paraplegic. It was the final episode on 1985's Sunday Australian Movies series.

== Synopsis ==
A man encounters a huge life setback, when a motorcycle accident leaves him paralysed. With the help of a hospital spinal unit and the company of a visiting actress, his future starts to looks more positive.

== Cast ==
- Shane Connor as Steve McNair
- Sue Jones as Haley Birchfield
- Robyn Gibbes as Kathy
- Tibor Gyapjas as Mike
- Alan Hopgood as Tom Birchfield

== Reception ==
Bronwyn Watson in the Sydney Morning Herald's The Guide wrote "Emerging is a powerful story about the handicapped. It's about people who, through accidents, are confined to wheelchairs for the rest of their lives. Suddenly they are looked upon as sick and useless, but mentally they are alert and well. Emerging is about coming to terms with this situation." Jason Romney in the Age's Green Guide writes "Emerging cuts into the psychology of physical disability, showing the pressures that can be placed on any one of us after misfortune. It is not a glamorous program but it makes powerful and thought-provoking television." The Sun-Herald's Jaqueline Lee Lewes says "Obviously, considering the nature of the story, there are dark moments in Emerging, but there's humour, too. It is a thoughtful, gutsy and thoroughly compelling play."
