= Bogdan Koca =

Australian actor

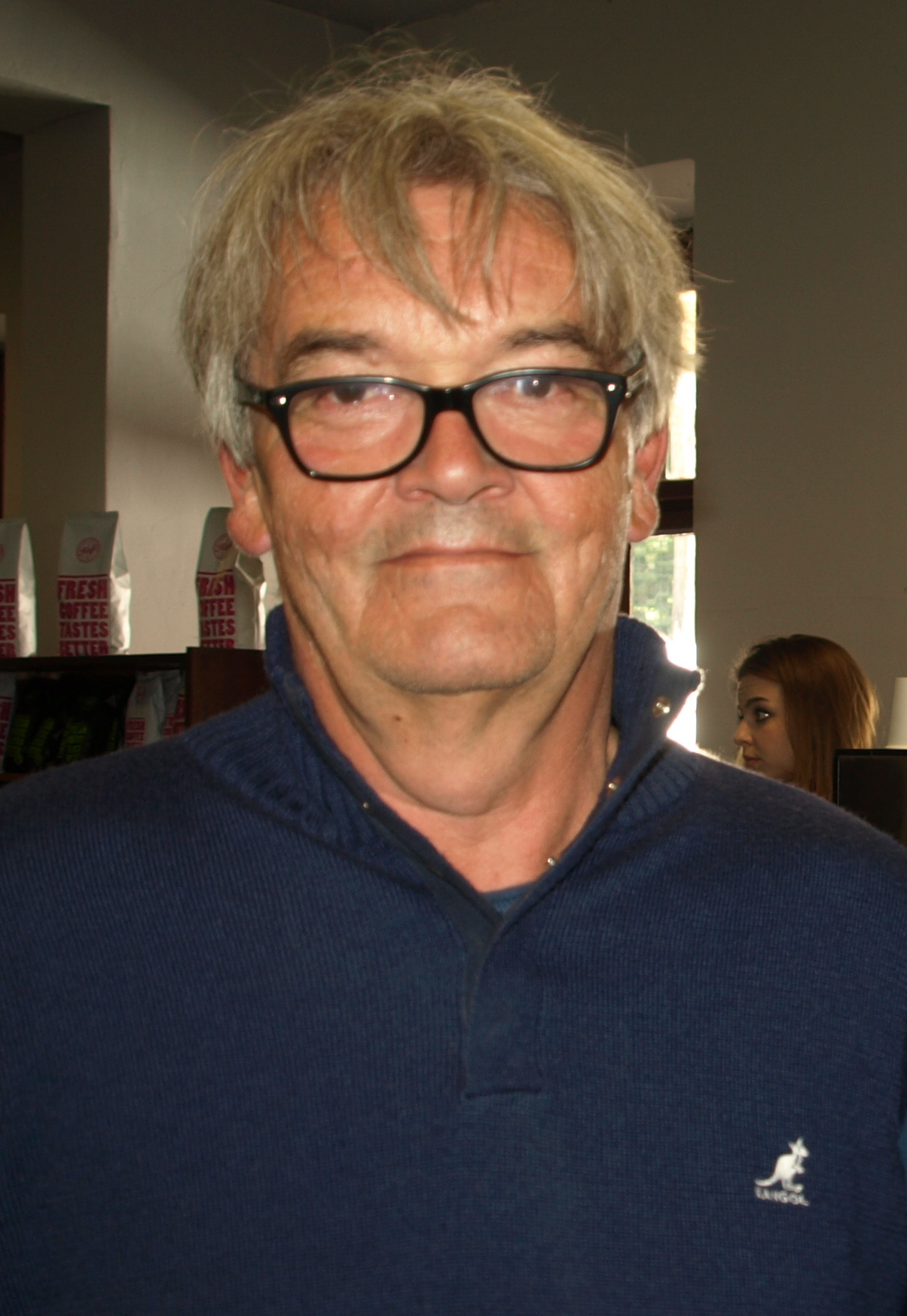
Image of Bogdan Koca

Bogdan Koca is a Polish-born Australian actor, director and writer.

== Biography ==
Koca was born in Poland where he first took up acting, earning Best Actor awards from audience votes in Wrocław and from the Minister of Culture. He left Poland in 1981 and arrived in Australia in 1983 with his then wife Gosia Dobrowolska.

His screen roles include Alexandra's Project and The Proposition,

Koca's Australian theatre career includes writing My Name is Such and Such, Conrad Knowles and Sparring Partner

== Accolades ==
For his performance in Ghosts… of the Civil Dead he was nominated for the 1989 Australian Film Institute Award for Best Actor in a Supporting Role.
