= Marion (miniseries) =

- Written by: Cliff Green
- Directed by: Oscar Whitbread; David Zweck; Keith Wilkes; Douglas Sharp
- Starring: Helen Morse
- Country of origin: Australia
- Original language: English
- No. of episodes: 4 x 1 hour

Production
- Producer: Oscar Whitbread

Original release
- Network: ABC
- Release: 17 March – 7 April 1974

Marion is a 1974 Australian television miniseries about a young school teacher in rural Victoria during World War II. The series won a number of awards.

== Cast ==
- Helen Morse as Marion Richards
- Patsy King as Mrs Finnegan
- Christine Amor as Sue Rogers
- Kerry Armstrong as Elizabeth Andrews
- Elspeth Ballantyne as Joan Carruthers
