= Assembly Hall Theatre, Tunbridge Wells =

Theatre in Kent, England

Coordinates: 51.131940°N 0.266020°E

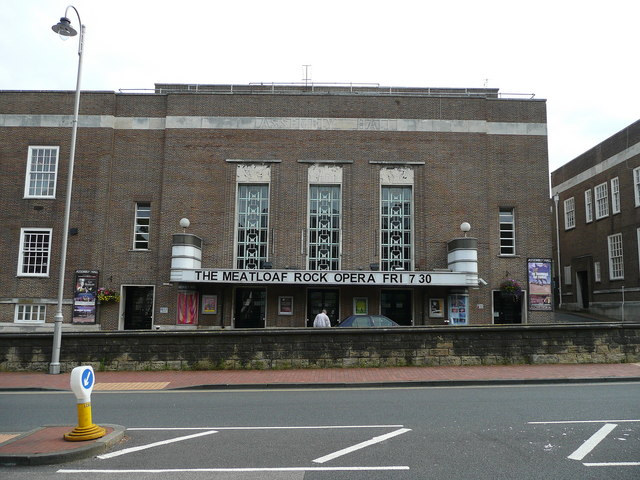
Assembly Hall, Tunbridge Wells.

The Assembly Hall Theatre is a theatre in Tunbridge Wells seating 1,020 people. The theatre hosts a variety of popular music, comedy, family, dance, drama, classical music and variety events, as well as an annual pantomime.

Since 1967, the Assembly Hall has been home to the Tunbridge Wells Operatic and Dramatic Society. Their first performance was Gilbert and Sullivan's The Gondoliers.

Past performers have included Shane Filan of Westlife, Coolio, Let Loose and The Stranglers.

== History ==
Built by the Tunbridge Wells Corporation and designed by Percy Thomas and Ernest Prestwich, the Assembly Hall Theatre opened on 24 May 1939.

When first built, the auditorium had a capacity of 822 on the ground floor, with a further 320 in the balcony. It was also equipped with a 22 ft x 29 ft cinema screen to allow films to be shown. It now seats up to 993 people, with 672 on the ground floor (373 in the stalls and 300 in tiered stalls) and 320 on the balcony (circle).

During World War II, the theatre was used for dances for troops, film shows and events to raise money for the war effort.

By 2001, the theatre was attracting audiences of over 150,000 each year.

The theatre was refurbished in 2001 with works including the provision of additional dressing rooms, remodelling the bar, repainting of the foyer and front of house areas, and new seating, air conditioning and other facilities.

The auditorium closed again in August 2015 for a £1.5 million refurbishment. New tiered charcoal-coloured seating replaced the previous fixtures. The balcony seating was re-upholstered in the same hard-wearing material. Overheating was addressed and the bar area was redesigned in black, charcoal and gold. Upon reopening, the bar will accept contactless payments.

== Location ==
The theatre is located on Crescent Road, forming part of the Tunbridge Wells Civic Centre in the centre of the town.

== Architecture ==
The building is predominantly built from brick, with details in silver and red bricks and in Portland stone. The walls and floor of the entrance hall are of Roman Travertine Marble, with gold and fawn ceilings.

A large lounge was constructed parallel with the main hall, originally designed for suppers to be served when the hall was used for dances.
