= John Misto =

Australian playwright and screenwriter (born 1952)

- Born: 13 October 1952 (age 73)
- Education: University of New South Wales; Australian Film and Television School
- Occupations: Playwright, television screenwriter, novelist

John Misto (born 13 October 1952) is an Australian writer for film, television, stage, and fiction. His works have won "many awards including the Queensland Premier's Literary Award, three Australian Film Institute Awards, three Australian Writers' Guild Awards and a Gold Plaque at the Chicago Television Awards".

== Early life and education ==
John Misto began writing at the age of twelve and did his first television interview at ABC Television two years later. Much of his writing has been influenced by his strict Catholic family upbringing and a similar education at a Catholic secondary school in Sydney.

After graduating in Arts and Law from the University of New South Wales, he worked in the state public service as a Research Officer for the Privacy Committee. His experiences there laid the foundations for his television series, The Damnation of Harvey McHugh. He left the public service to concentrate on working as a theatre and television writer.

== Television writing ==
Misto completed a Diploma in Scriptwriting at the Australian Film and Television School in 1980. He then joined the Grundy Organisation and worked as a scriptwriter on the popular Australian television series, The Young Doctors. Two years later he wrote his first telemovie, Natural Causes, a black comedy about ageing hippies and murder, for ABC Television. That work won an Australian Film Institute Award for the Best Telemovie Script and the Australian Writers' Guild Award for Best Original Telemovie.

Further works for ABC Television included G.P., Dancing Daze, Palace of Dreams, The Cut, a six-hour series about a corrupt sports agent, The Damnation of Harvey McHugh and the telemovie Sisters of War.

Misto has written extensively for children’s television. He penned several episodes of the children’s television series Dusty and Butterfly Island as well as the telemovie of Butterfly Island. He also wrote the award-winning telemovie Peter and Pompey for the Australian Children's Television Foundation.

He has written scripts for popular television shows such as the telemovie Heroes’ Mountain: The Rescue of Stuart Diver for Network Ten, The Day of the Roses: The True Granville Story, Mary MacKillop and Gordon Bennett for Mike Willesee’s Australians, A Country Practice, Dirt Water Dynasty and White Collar Blue. He also co-wrote the miniseries The Last Frontier, starring Linda Evans and Jack Thompson, which was screened on the CBS television network in the United States.

== Stage plays ==
Over the years John Misto has written extensively for the theatre. His first play, Sky, was a monologue and was staged at the Ensemble Theatre in Kirribilli, Sydney. It was nominated for the Sydney Critics’ Award for Best New Play of the Year and also received a commendation from the Australian Human Rights Commission.

That was followed by the play, The Shoe-Horn Sonata (1996) which premiered at the same theatre, and was subsequently performed dozens of times around Australia, in London, and in Prague (in Czech translation), followed by three years of national tours around Australia and further seasons at the Ensemble and at the NIDA Theatre, Kensington, Sydney. The play was awarded the AWGIE Television Mini-Series Original Award, the NSW Premier's Literary Award and the Australia Remembers National Play Competition. The play was listed for twenty years as a study text for the New South Wales Higher School Certificate. As at 2025 it is still being studied in Australian schools.

Misto’s next plays included Gossamer, which was based on the Cottingley fairy hoax of 1917 and which was played at the Ensemble and at the Fortune Theatre in Dunedin, New Zealand; Dark Voyager ("about the turbulent relationship between Joan Crawford and Marilyn Monroe"); and Harp on the Willow.

In 2008 Misto branched out into musical theatre biography when he co-wrote Peace Train: The Cat Stevens Story which had several national tours around Australia, a sold-out performance at the Sydney Opera House and a national tour of the United Kingdom in 2017.

In 2017 Misto wrote Lip Service about the life of American make-up millionairess, Helena Rubinstein and her war with Elizabeth Arden and Revlon's Charles Revson. Lip Service was staged in Sydney at the Ensemble Theatre and in Melbourne.

In the same year, Lip Service, with a new title, Madame Rubinstein, had a sold-out season at The Park Theatre in London’s West End starring Miriam Margolyes and Frances Barber. Madame Rubinstein had two seasons and a national tour in the Czech Republic and was staged in other Eastern European countries: Lithuania, Belarus, Bulgaria, Slovakia, Latvia, Ukraine and Russia (in the cities of Ekaterinburg and Norilsk), as well as in Israel.

In 2022 Madame Rubinstein premiered at the Pushkin Theatre in Moscow starring Russia’s leading actress, Vera Alentova, on which occasion Misto became the first Australian playwright to have a play staged at a commercial theatre in Moscow. As at 2025 the play remains in the theatre’s repertoire.

== Works ==
=== Television ===
- A Country Practice (1981)
- Waterloo Station (1983)
- The Young Doctors (1983)
- Starting Out (1983)
- Palace of Dreams (1985) – 2 episodes
- Natural Causes (1985)
- Dancing Daze (1986)
- The Last Frontier (1986)
- Dusty (1988) (TV series)
- Touch the Sun: Peter and Pompey (1988) (TV movie)
- The Dirtwater Dynasty (1988)
- The Fremantle Conspiracy (1988)
- G.P. (1989–91) – 3 episodes
- Butterfly Island (1993) (TV movie)
- The Damnation of Harvey McHugh (1994) – creator, 13 episodes
- The Day of the Roses (1998)
- Finding Hope (2001) (TV movie)
- Heroes' Mountain (2002) (TV movie)
- MDA (2002) – 1 episode
- White Collar Blue (2003) – 3 episodes
- Second Chance (2005) (TV movie)
- The Cut (2009) – 6 episodes
- Sisters of War (2010) (TV movie)
- Tricky Business (2012) – 1 episode

=== Theatre ===
- The Last Time I Saw Paris (1980)
- Room for Dreamers (1980)
- The Dying of Angel Dunleavy (1980)
- Sky (1992)
- The Shoe-Horn Sonata (1995)
- Gossamer (1997)
- Harp on the Willow (2007)
- Peace Train: The Cat Stevens Story (2008)
- Dark Voyager (2014)
- Madame Rubinstein (2017) [produced in Sydney as Lip Service]

== Works in printed form ==
=== Plays ===
- The Shoe-Horn Sonata, Sydney: Currency Press, 1996
- Madame Rubinstein, London: Bloomsbury Methuen Drama, 2017
- Lip Service (Madame Rubinstein), Sydney: Origin Theatrical, 2018
- Gossamer, Sydney: Origin Theatrical, 2018
- Dark Voyager, Sydney: Origin Theatrical, 2018
- Harp on the Willow, Sydney: Origin Theatrical, 2018

=== Novels ===
- Peter and Pompey, Fitzroy, Victoria: Penguin/McPhee Gribble with the Australian Children's Television Foundation, 1988 (Touch the Sun series)
- The Devil’s Companions, Sydney: Hodder Headline Australia, 2005

=== Articles ===
- "The Make-Up Wars" (feature story), The Sunday Express (UK), 7 May 2017
- "The Coming of the Fairies" (feature story), Sunday Spectrum section, The Sydney Morning Herald, 11 May 1997
- "Bring Back the Golden Years", movie section, The Australian, 2 July 2005
- "Profile: John Misto: Face to Face", The Weekend Australian, 14–15 May 2005

== Awards ==
- 1986: Australian Film Institute Award (AACTA): Best Screenplay – Telefeature for Natural Causes
- 1986: Australian Writers’ Guild Award (AWGIE): Best Telemovie Script for Natural Causes
- 1986: Australian Writers’ Guild Award (AWGIE): Best Script, Series Episode for Palace of Dreams Episode 10
- 1994: Australian Film Institute Award (AACTA): Best Screenplay Television Drama for The Damnation of Harvey McHugh
- 1995: Australia Remembers National Play Competition for The Shoe-Horn Sonata ($20,000 prize donated to the Nurses’ National Memorial Fund)
- 1996: New South Wales Premier’s Literary Award for Best Play for The Shoe-Horn Sonata
- 1998: Television Society of Australia Award: Scriptwriting One-Off Drama or Mini-Series for Peter & Pompey
- 1999: Australian Film Institute Award (AACTA): Best Television Drama Script for The Day of the Roses
- 1999: Australian Writers’ Guild Award (AWGIE): Best Script Mini-Series for The Day of the Roses
- 2002: Seaborn Broughton & Walford Foundation Playwright’s Award (Rodney Seaborn Playwrights Award for Best Play) for Harp on the Willow
- 2003: Gold Plaque for Best Telemovie: Chicago International Television Awards for Heroes’ Mountain
- 2010: Queensland Premier’s Literary Award: Best Television Script for Sisters of War
