= The Oracle (TV series) =

- Written by: Tony Morphett; Laura Jones; Michael Cove
- Directed by: Sandra Levy
- Starring: John Gregg
- Country of origin: Australia
- Original language: English
- No. of episodes: 12

Production
- Producer: Alan Burke
- Camera setup: ABC TV
- Running time: 50 mins

Original release
- Release: 12 March – 28 May 1979

The Oracle is a 1979 Australian TV series of twelve 50-minute episodes that aired on ABC TV, about a talkback radio announcer.

== Synopsis ==
Steve Black (John Gregg) is a successful Sydney talkback radio announcer, known to his listeners as 'The Oracle' – who can be heard on 2KX from 9:00 am to midday. He takes calls from listeners with all kinds of issues, sympathising, ridiculing or often helping them. Black's beautiful wife Suzanne (Pamela Gibbons), was once a successful singer who is bored of being a housewife and wants to return to her former career.

== Cast ==
=== Main ===
- John Gregg as Steve Black
- Pamela Gibbons as Suzanne Black
- Julie Hamilton as Tommy
- Tracy Mann
- Ruth Cracknell

=== Guests ===
- Maggie Kirkpatrick
- Tina Bursill
- Joe Hasham
- Don Pascoe
- Danny Adcock

== Episodes ==
Ep#	Episode	Air date	Ref.
1	"Incest to Income Tax"	12 March 1979	
2	"A Smack in the Mouth"	19 March 1979	
3	"All That's Left of the Song"	26 March 1979	
4	"Everything's Coming Up Roses"	2 April 1979	
5	"You & the Night & the Muzak"	9 April 1979	
6	"Time Wounds All Heels"	16 April 1979	
7	"Six O'Clock High"	23 April 1979	
8	"Win a Few, Lose a Few"	30 April 1979	
9	"Take a Side, Any Side"	7 May 1979	
10	"Fresh out of Miracles"	14 May 1979	
11	"Black on the Line"	21 May 1979	
12	"Live from Las Vegas"	28 May 1979	

== Production ==
The Oracle was the first ABC drama to be produced entirely by electronic method. A small external broadcast facility designed for drama production by ABC engineers was used for all exterior recording.

== Controversy ==
There was a controversial episode which featured a scene where a baby was killed.
