= Summer of the Seventeenth Doll (1978 film) =

Summer of the Seventeenth Doll is a 1978 Australian television film adaptation of the play Summer of the Seventeenth Doll.

It was a filmed version of the Melbourne Theatre Company's version of the play. The MTC had performed the entire "Doll" trilogy. The performances were filmed and broadcast on Channel Seven.
