= L.A. Noire =

2011 video game

- Original cover art for PlayStation 3, Xbox 360, and Windows
- Developer: Team Bondi (Note: Development assistance was provided by Rockstar's North, Leeds, San Diego, and New England studios. The game was ported to Windows by Rockstar Leeds. It was developed for Nintendo Switch, PlayStation 4, and Xbox One by Virtuos, with development assistance from Rockstar San Diego, Toronto, North, and Leeds. Video Games Deluxe developed L.A. Noire: The VR Case Files.)
- Publisher: Rockstar Games
- Director: Brendan McNamara
- Producers: Naresh Hirani; Josh Needleman
- Designer: Alex Carlyle
- Programmers: Franta Fulin; David Heironymus
- Artists: Chee Kin Chan; Ben Brudenell
- Writer: Brendan McNamara
- Composers: Andrew Hale; Simon Hale
- Platforms: PlayStation 3; Xbox 360; Windows; Nintendo Switch; PlayStation 4; Xbox One
- Release: 17 May 2011: PS3, Xbox 360; NA: 17 May 2011; PAL: 20 May 2011 Windows; NA: 8 November 2011; PAL: 11 November 2011 Switch, PS4, Xbox One; WW: 14 November 2017
- Genre: Action-adventure
- Mode: Single-player

L.A. Noire is a 2011 action-adventure game developed by Team Bondi and published by Rockstar Games. Set in Los Angeles in 1947, the game follows the rise of detective Cole Phelps through the ranks of the Los Angeles Police Department as he solves a range of cases across various bureaus. When he is tasked with investigating a morphine distribution ring involving several of his former squadmates from World War II, Phelps finds both his personal and professional life falling into turmoil, and reluctantly joins forces with his estranged former comrade, Jack Kelso, to uncover a major conspiracy involving prominent Los Angeles figures.

The game is played from a third-person perspective. The player may freely roam its interactive open world, primarily in a vehicle or on foot. As the game progresses, the player advances through several police department bureaus—Patrol, Traffic, Homicide, Vice, and Arson. The story is divided into multiple "cases", during which players must investigate crime scenes for clues, follow up leads, and interrogate suspects and witnesses; the player's success at these activities impacts how much of each case's story is revealed and their overall rating. The game features fast-paced action sequences, including chases, combat, and gunfights. Outside of cases, the player can complete optional street crimes and collect items found around the game world.

The development of L.A. Noire began following Team Bondi's founding in 2004, and was assisted by multiple Rockstar studios worldwide. L.A. Noire uses the proprietary motion capture technology MotionScan, which captures actors' facial expressions from every angle, resulting in a realistic recreation of a human face essential for the game's interrogations. As part of their research for the open world, the development team conducted field research in Los Angeles. The game features an original score inspired by 1940s films, and contains licensed music of songs from the era. The game was delayed numerous times through its seven-year development, which included a change of publisher and platforms. The working hours and managerial style of the studio was met with public complaints from staff members, and Team Bondi closed shortly after the game's initial release.

L.A. Noire was the first video game honoured as an official selection at the Tribeca Film Festival. It was released for the PlayStation 3 and Xbox 360 consoles in May 2011, and for Windows in November; an enhanced version was released for Nintendo Switch, PlayStation 4, and Xbox One in November 2017. The game received positive reviews from critics, with praise directed at the facial animation, narrative, characters, performances, music, world design, and interrogation gameplay, though responses to the shooting and driving mechanics were mixed. It shipped four million units in its first month and 7.5 million by September 2017, and received multiple year-end nominations from gaming publications. L.A. Noire: The VR Case Files, a subset of cases playable in virtual reality, was released in December 2017.

== Gameplay ==
L.A. Noire is an action-adventure game with neo-noir and crime genre elements. Played from a third-person perspective, the game is set in an open-world environment featuring Los Angeles in 1947. The player completes cases to progress through the story, fulfilling objectives in a generally linear order; as they roam the open world, the player can also complete optional street crimes—short, linear scenarios with set objectives—and collect items such as golden film reels, vehicles, novels, and golden records. (Note: The novels and golden records are exclusive to the Nintendo Switch, PlayStation 4, and Xbox One versions of the game.) The player can also discover multiple landmarks based on real monuments from Los Angeles in the 1940s. For most of the game, the player controls Cole Phelps, a Los Angeles Police Department (LAPD) patrolman who advances through the police department bureaus (desks) of Traffic, Homicide, Vice, and Arson; in some cases during the final desk, the player controls investigator Jack Kelso. The player has the option to play the game in black and white to imitate film noir.

When interrogating witnesses and suspects, the player has the option to believe them, doubt them, or accuse them of lying. (Note: These options are presented as "Truth", "Doubt", and "Lie" in the PlayStation 3, Xbox 360, and Windows versions. They were changed to "Good Cop", "Bad Cop", and "Accuse" in the Switch, PlayStation 4, and Xbox One versions and The VR Case Files to reflect the player character's reaction. During development, the commands were originally "Coax", "Force", and "Lie".) The options were enlarged in the Nintendo Switch (pictured) and virtual reality versions.

While solving cases, the player discovers evidence, including information from non-player characters or physical clues found in or around crime scenes, locations of interest, or dead bodies; several pieces of physical evidence can be manipulated or further investigated to discover more information. When all key clues are discovered at a crime scene, the investigation music concludes. The player can also use telephones or gamewells to contact the police radio and access additional information. During cases, the player interrogates suspects and witnesses to discover information. When the interviewee responds, the player is given the option to either believe them, doubt them, or accuse them of lying. If the player accuses them of lying, they must submit evidence to prove it. The player's in-game notebook is used to list evidence, locations, and people involved in the case, as well as to select questions during interrogations.

When interrogating two suspects at the police station, the player may decide whom to charge with the crime; charging the wrong suspect affects the case's end rating—a five-star scale determined based on the player's performance in investigations, interrogations, and behaviour while driving. The player can use Intuition points during investigations to locate remaining clues, or during interrogation by removing an answer or discovering the most popular answer among players via the Rockstar Games Social Club. Progressing through the game will increase the player's Rank, which unlocks outfits and hidden vehicles, and earns an additional Intuition point; the maximum rank is 20. In some cases, while searching for clues, the player can discover newspapers, which provide access to a short cinematic covering a part of the game's overarching plot.

The game's world is primarily traversed on foot or in a vehicle. The player can climb over fences and up pipes and ladders to access different areas. While driving, the player can turn on the vehicle's siren, allowing them clearer passage through streets. The game also allows the player to skip travel sequences: as Phelps, they can nominate their partner as the driver and select the destination; as Kelso, who lacks a partner, they select the destination and arrive after a loading screen. As Phelps, the player can also ask their partner for directions. The game features fast-paced action sequences, including chases, combat, and gunfights. The player uses melee attacks and firearms to fight enemies; weapons can be swapped by opening the boot of the player's police vehicle. In combat, auto-aim and a cover system can be used as assistance against enemies. Should the player take damage, the screen colour will begin to fade to black and white; when free from damage, the character's health will gradually regenerate. Weapons can only be used in appropriate circumstances, such as during firefights; in some chase sequences, the player has the option to fire a warning shot against fleeing suspects. The player's partner will sometimes shoot at suspect vehicles during driving chase sequences. The player is presented with the option to skip action sequences and continue through the narrative upon failing three times.

== Synopsis ==
=== Characters ===
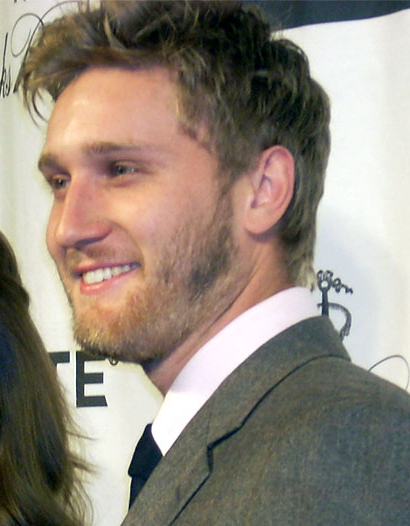
Aaron Staton

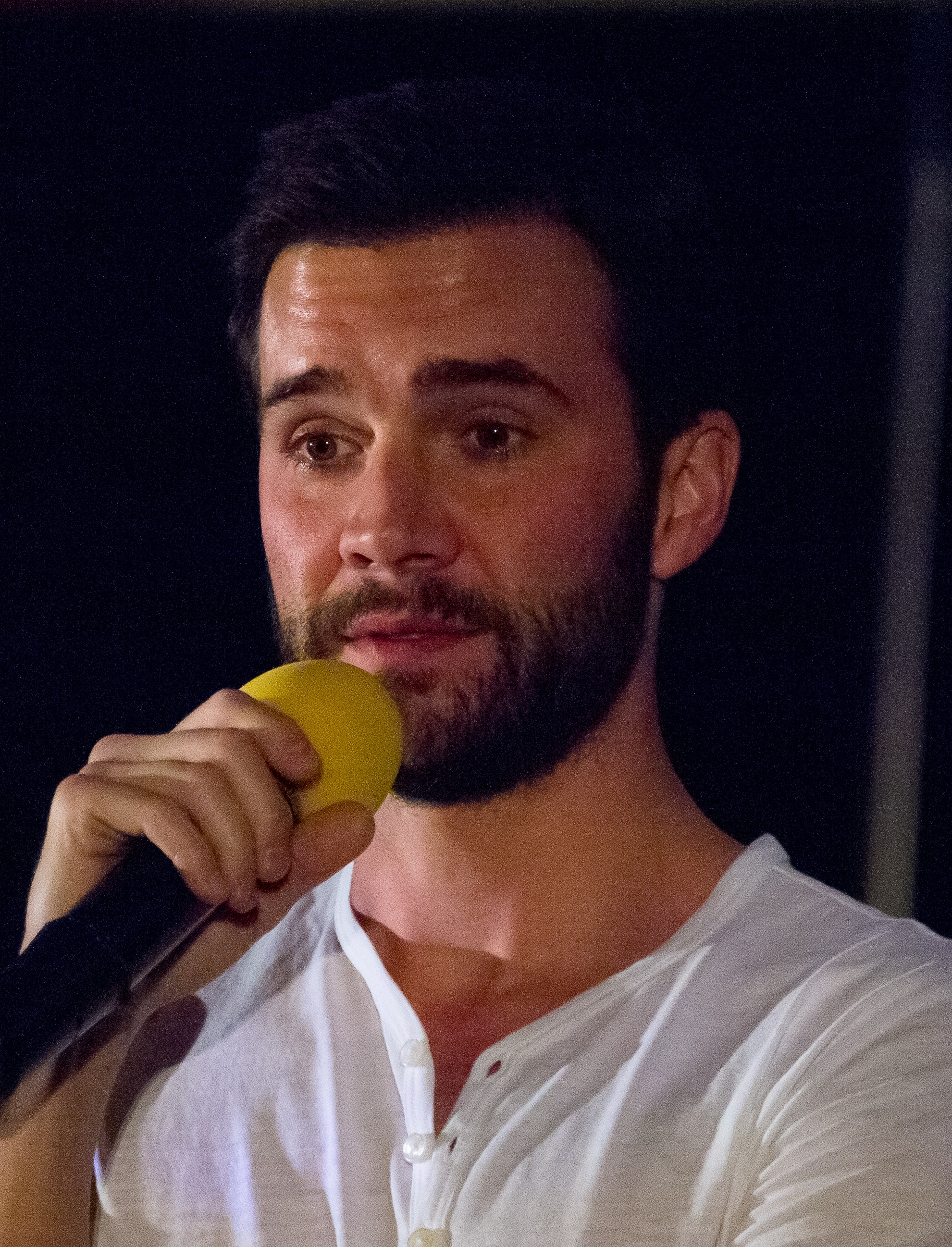
Gil McKinney

Staton and McKinney portray Cole Phelps and Jack Kelso, respectively.

For most of the game, the player takes on the role of Cole Phelps (Aaron Staton), a decorated United States Marine Corps veteran from the Sixth Marines. The game begins with Phelps as an LAPD patrol officer alongside his partner Ralph Dunn (Rodney Scott), another new recruit. When Phelps is promoted to the Traffic desk, led by Captain Gordon Leary (Ned Vaughn), he is partnered with Stefan Bekowsky (Sean McGowan), a Polish American whom Phelps eventually befriends. Upon his promotion to Homicide, led by Captain James Donnelly (Andrew Connolly), Phelps is partnered with Rusty Galloway (Michael McGrady), a weary and cynical detective who often challenges Phelps's theories and opinions. In the Vice bureau, led by Lieutenant Archie Colmyer (Steve Rankin), Phelps becomes partners with Roy Earle (Adam J. Harrington), a sardonic and corrupt detective with whom Phelps repeatedly clashes over morality, behaviour, and technique. During his time in Vice, Phelps begins an extramarital affair with Elsa Lichtmann (Erika Heynatz), a German jazz singer. As a detective, Phelps frequently works with coroner Dr. Malcolm Carruthers (Andy Umberger) and technical crime scene investigator Ray Pinker (JD Cullum).

The five main detectives: Phelps, Bekowsky, Galloway, Earle, and Biggs

Following his demotion to the Arson desk, led by Captain Lachlan McKelty (Randy Oglesby), Phelps is partnered with Herschel Biggs (Keith Szarabajka), a former Marine and proficient detective who is reclusive and opposed to partners but eventually grows to respect Phelps. For some Arson cases, the player controls Jack Kelso (Gil McKinney), a former Marine with whom Phelps developed an intense rivalry. Kelso, initially a claims investigator at California Fire and Life and later a District Attorney Investigator, helps Phelps and Elsa discover the truth behind the Suburban Redevelopment Fund (SRF)—a program founded under the pretense of providing affordable housing for returning veterans. Members of the SRF include real estate magnate Leland Monroe (John Noble), California Fire and Life vice-president Curtis Benson (Jim Abele), and psychiatrist Harlan Fontaine (Peter Blomquist). Fontaine's mentee is medical student Courtney Sheldon (Chad Todhunter)—a former Marine stationed with Phelps and Kelso—who becomes involved in the city's drug trade through a partnership with gangster Mickey Cohen (Patrick Fischler). One of Fontaine's patients is Ira Hogeboom (J. Marvin Campbell), a former flamethrower operator from the Sixth Marines who became severely traumatised after unintentionally burning out a cave of civilians on Phelps's orders.

=== Plot ===
In 1947, after successfully solving a major murder case as a patrol officer, Phelps is promoted to detective. His tenure at the Traffic desk results in solving multiple cases of murder and fraud. Six months later, after a stint on the Burglary desk, Phelps is promoted to the Homicide desk. He and Galloway investigate various cases containing similarities to the Black Dahlia murder, arresting numerous suspects. However, Phelps is doubtful they are apprehending the actual murderers; his theories are ultimately proven correct. They eventually track down and kill the real murderer but are unable to publicly disclose his identity due to his relation to a powerful government official. The wrongfully arrested suspects are due to be released via mistrial.

Upon being promoted to the Vice division, Phelps investigates the distribution of military surplus morphine, stolen from the ship that had brought home his former Marine unit from the war. He learns that several members had stolen and distributed the morphine, only to be assassinated on the orders of Cohen. During this time, Phelps begins his affair with Elsa. Earle helps several prominent figures in the city draw attention away from a major prostitution scandal by exposing Phelps's adultery before he is able to draw a confession from Sheldon over his involvement with the stolen morphine. In exchange, Earle is given a place in the SRF. Phelps's marriage ends, he becomes disgraced in the LAPD, and he is demoted to the Arson desk, where he is tasked with investigating several suspicious house fires. Despite noting a solid connection between them and a housing development the SRF operates, Phelps is warned off by Earle from pursuing the syndicate and its founder Monroe. Seeking help, Phelps prompts Kelso to look into the matter.

Kelso discovers the development uses unsuitable building materials, and his boss Benson is knowingly insuring them. Following a shootout at Monroe's mansion, Kelso learns the syndicate used one of Fontaine's patients to burn down the homes of those who would not agree to sell their property to the fund while the occupants were on vacation; eventually, the patient accidentally killed four people in one such fire and became irreversibly traumatised. The patient confronts and murders Fontaine at his clinic and kidnaps Elsa. Investigating the clinic, Phelps discovers the syndicate was a front to defraud the Federal Government: knowing the government would later purchase the plots through eminent domain for a planned highway, Monroe would acquire land with money invested by the syndicate and build surreptitiously cheap houses to increase their value. Phelps also discovers that Sheldon, overcome with guilt, had provided Fontaine with the stolen morphine under the pretense that Fontaine would legally provide the morphine to medical facilities, with the profits being reinvested into the SRF; Fontaine later murdered Sheldon after gaining knowledge of Kelso's investigation into the SRF.

Kelso realises Fontaine's patient was Hogeboom and joins Phelps in pursuing him and Elsa into the Los Angeles River tunnels. The pair rescue Elsa, and Kelso shoots Hogeboom to end his suffering. As the water rises within the tunnels following intense rainfall, Elsa and Kelso manage to escape, but Phelps is washed away by a violent current and dies. At Phelps's funeral, Earle delivers a eulogy, claiming Phelps was falsely accused of wrongdoings and that he had exposed the corruption of Fontaine and Monroe. After Elsa leaves in disgust, Kelso asks Biggs to comfort her; Biggs confirms to Kelso that, while Kelso and Phelps were not friends, they were never enemies either. In a closing epilogue flashback, Kelso is revealed to have known about the stolen morphine but refused to be involved in its distribution, knowing the trouble it would cause.

== Development ==
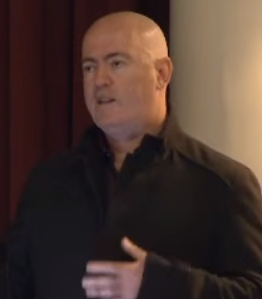
Team Bondi founder Brendan McNamara wrote and directed L.A. Noire.

After the release of The Getaway (2002), writer and director Brendan McNamara left developer Team Soho and moved from London to his native Sydney. In mid-2003, he founded the six-person development studio Team Bondi alongside former Team Soho developers. The development of L.A. Noire began shortly thereafter, in 2004. The studio had signed an exclusive deal with Sony Computer Entertainment to develop a game for the PlayStation 3, though the publishing rights were handed to Rockstar Games by September 2006. The development team visited Rockstar's headquarters in New York every few months to exhibit progress. Development was assisted by multiple studios owned by Rockstar Games worldwide. Analyst estimations place the game's combined development and marketing budget at more than US$50 million, which would make it one of the most expensive video games to develop.

Unlike other games by Rockstar, which run on the Rockstar Advanced Game Engine, L.A. Noire uses a proprietary engine from Team Bondi. McNamara led the founding of Depth Analysis, a sister company to Team Bondi that developed the motion capture technology MotionScan, which records actors at 1,000 frames per second with 32 surrounding cameras to capture facial expressions from every angle, resulting in a realistic recreation of a human face. The technology is central to the interrogation mechanic as players are required to use reactions to judge whether the interviewee is lying. Its precise requirements demanded extensive preparation, including hairstyling for performers. Rockstar was doubtful about the process and the team considered using the same technique as other Rockstar games like Red Dead Redemption (2010) as a fallback. The game uses Havok as its physics engine. Eleven cases across two desks—Bunko and Burglary—were cut as the team suspected they would not fit on one Blu-ray for PlayStation 3; the Xbox 360 version utilised three discs, though it originally used up to six prior to compression. A version of Grand Theft Auto's wanted system—wherein the player would evade and attack other police officers—was removed as it felt out of character for Phelps.

McNamara had been interested in 1940s Los Angeles for some time—while working on The Getaway, he had a screensaver of the first freeway being built in Los Angeles—and felt the improvement in lighting systems from the PlayStation 2 to PlayStation 3 allowed the possibility to explore the film noir genre. He began with writing a 4–5-page outline before reading stories from the Los Angeles Public Library to use as inspiration. The team spent the first year-and-a-half of development researching Los Angeles by using newspapers and magazines, organising research trips, and capturing photographs; a total of 180,000 photographs were available as resources throughout development, and over 1,000 newspapers were used for research. The open world of 1947 Los Angeles was modelled using aerial photographs taken by photographer Robert Spence, which helped to create traffic patterns and public transport routes, as well as the location and condition of buildings. Jay Leno's collection of vintage vehicles was photographed for reference.

The game features the motion capture technology MotionScan, which records actors with 32 surrounding cameras to capture facial expressions from every angle, resulting in a realistic recreation of the human face.

Building interiors were based on real Los Angeles buildings; the team extensively studied the Barclay Hotel for an accurate recreation in-game. While striving for an accurate recreation, the team took some artistic licence, including the appearance of Intolerance's Babylon film set, which was destroyed prior to the 1940s but included to celebrate its history. The team created over 140 production bibles during development, acting as style guides with information about floorplans, dressing, signs, graphics, lighting, and reference material. Several in-game cases were inspired by real-life crimes reported by the city's media at the time; for example, "The Red Lipstick Murder" is based on the unsolved murder of Jeanne French in February 1947. When creating the themes, narrative, visuals, and sounds, McNamara and the team were inspired by several films, (Note: Films used as inspiration include The Asphalt Jungle (1950), Chinatown (1974), Jazz: A Film by Ken Burns (2001), The Naked City (1948), Out of the Past (1947), Sweet Smell of Success (1957), and The Third Man (1949).) albums, (Note: Albums used as influences include Chet Baker's Witch Doctor (1985), Miles Davis's Kind of Blue (1959) and Sketches of Spain (1960), Dexter Gordon's One Flight Up (1965), and Oscar Peterson's On the Town with the Oscar Peterson Trio (1958).) television and radio shows, (Note: McNamara was inspired by the radio series Dragnet (1949–1975) and its subsequent television series Badge 714 (1951–1959), as well as the television series Naked City (1958–1963).) and books. (Note: Books used as influences include: James Lee Burke's A Stained White Radiance (1992); James M. Cain's Double Indemnity (1943); Raymond Chandler's The Big Sleep (1939), The High Window (1942), and The Long Goodbye (1953); James Ellroy's The Big Nowhere (1988) and L.A. Confidential (1990); Dashiell Hammett's The Dain Curse (1929), Red Harvest (1929), and The Maltese Falcon (1930); and Nathanael West's The Day of the Locust (1939).)

L.A. Noire has over twenty hours of voice work, and over 400 actors performed for the game. McNamara felt the technology allows players to connect with the characters in a way games had not achieved; he aimed "to go on a personal journey with characters". The team engaged Michael Uppendahl to direct the actors due to his experience. Secretive auditions were held for casting by Schiff/Audino, leading to several shared actors with the television show Mad Men, which used the same casting firm. Mad Men star Jon Hamm was considered for the role of Phelps, but Rockstar Vice President of Creativity Dan Houser suggested Staton. Staton joined production after McNamara pitched him the character, world, and technology. He worked on the project for about 18 months; unable to read the entire 2,200-page script, he received a 12-page document outlining the story and Phelps's history. Regarding the switch in player character from Phelps to Kelso, McNamara explained the player had to "go outside the realm of being a cop to bend the rules". He found the ending akin to A Tale of Two Cities (1859), with the characters coming "full circle" where "[Phelps] could do something for [Kelso] for once"; Phelps's death was partly inspired by the ending of the film Chinatown (1974). A gameplay sequence was originally meant to take place after Phelps's death but was cut as it "never really worked".

The actors' physical performances were mostly recorded using motion capture technology in a studio. From left to right: Michael McGrady, Aaron Staton, Sean McGowan, Adam J. Harrington.

Characters' physical movements were recorded using motion capture. McGowan felt Bekowsky, initially jealous of Phelps, eventually warmed up to him and treated him like a younger brother. McGrady felt his own introverted personality helped him connect to Galloway, who he felt convinced to play after reading the script. McNamara and Harrington considered Earle true to the genre, citing his dated attitudes and sense of entitlement. Harrington compared the motion capture performance to live acting, though found the MotionScan process "a little restricting". McNamara contacted Noble early in development and he regularly visited the studio; he was later offered a role, and began performing in early 2010. Some characters are based on real people, such as Mickey Cohen, while others are inspired; Captain Donnelly is loosely based on both LAPD Captain Jack Donahue and McNamara's father.

The game features an original score composed by Andrew Hale and Simon Hale. Recorded at Abbey Road Studios, the music was inspired by orchestral scores from 1940s films. The composers attempted to create music that felt accessible to players, avoiding an exclusive focus on swing or jazz. Andrew Hale found composing the score a flexible process "about setting a mood", as opposed to a "mechanical" process in which the music was specifically composed to fit the time period. To assist, Rockstar engaged Woody Jackson, who had previously collaborated with the team on the music of Red Dead Redemption; he re-orchestrated one of the themes and wrote much of the in-game music. While the score largely uses a live orchestra, Jackson found this led to difficulties with interactive music as the player can hear the loop; inspired by film noir and the works of musicians like Bernard Herman, Jackson departed from the existing music and wrote original tracks in about a month. The game contains licensed music provided by the in-game radio from artists such as Ella Fitzgerald, Dizzy Gillespie, and Billie Holiday. The developers engaged the Real Tuesday Weld to create three original vocal tracks to authentically suit the period's musical identity, performed by Claudia Brücken and sung in-game by Elsa.

=== Staff complaints ===
Rockstar's redesign of the original game logo was reportedly met with criticism from management at Team Bondi due to the absence of their company logo.

Shortly after release, a group of former Team Bondi employees launched a website called lanoirecredits.com, containing over 100 names excluded or incorrectly listed in the official credits. An anonymous employee claimed he was asked to work 10–12 hours every day, including weekends. Following this, in a report by IGN, several anonymous members of the team publicly discussed the studio's managerial, staff turnover rates, and working hours and conditions associated with L.A. Noire; some claimed McNamara had been controlling and verbally abusive, and others spoke about their increased workload as a result of high turnover. Several referenced the ongoing crunch throughout development; one claimed to occasionally work between 80 and 110 hours per week to meet milestones. Some ex-employees claimed they were not paid for overtime, which McNamara repudiated.

Following the publication of IGN's report, the International Game Developers Association launched an investigation against Team Bondi to verify the claims made. Lead gameplay programmer David Heironymus and senior gameplay programmer Charles Lefebvre rebutted the claims, acknowledging crunch was unfortunate but inevitable and stating they were not aware of any unpaid overtime or abusive working conditions. McNamara felt he had been unfairly maligned by many ex-employees, noting other artists and businessmen in other industries—such as Steve Jobs, Sam Peckinpah, and Werner Herzog—had performed worse actions than he had with much less vilification. He claimed the studio had improved its working conditions in the months after release, including the introduction of flexitime.

In July 2011, a series of confidential emails were leaked along with further comments from staff members who claimed they highlight the contentious relationship between Team Bondi and Rockstar. McNamara questioned how the confidential emails were allowed to be shared, noting it sets a "pretty dangerous precedent". Speaking to GamesIndustry.biz, an anonymous source from the development team claimed Rockstar "saved the project" but the relationship between Rockstar and Team Bondi was "badly damaged" and it was "quite clear" further collaborations were unlikely. The source claimed Rockstar was frustrated with the direction at Team Bondi, and as a result management at Team Bondi "resented Rockstar for taking lots of creative control". They added Rockstar "used to be very keen on making Team Bondi something like 'Rockstar Sydney'" but "the more they worked with Team Bondi management, the more they came to understand that this was a terrible idea". McNamara remained optimistic about his relationship with Rockstar and said "hopefully it doesn't have any hard feelings about us".

== Release and promotion ==
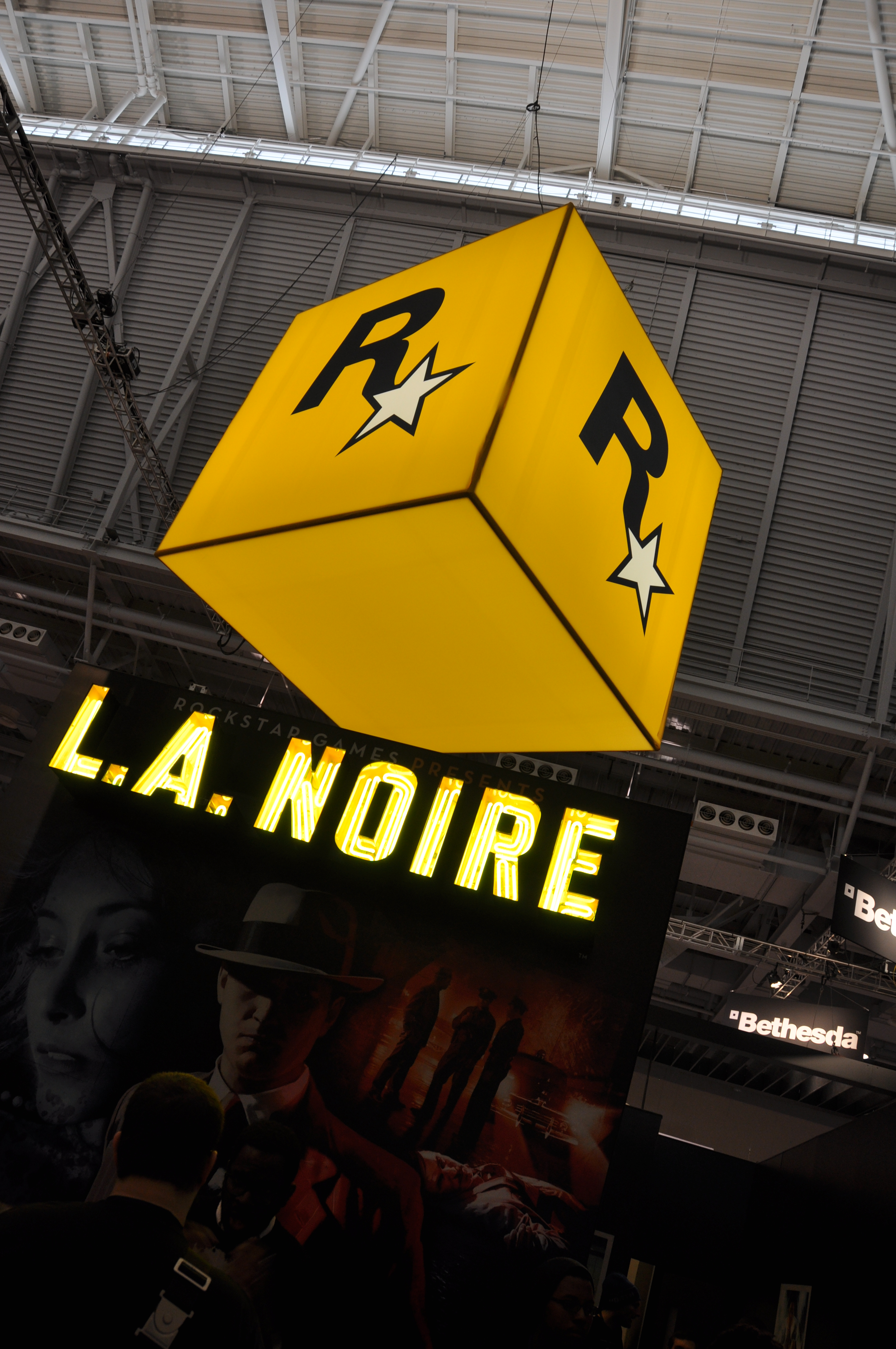
L.A. Noire was marketed through video trailers and press demonstrations, including at PAX East in 2011.

L.A. Noire was officially announced in 2005, to be released by Sony for the PlayStation 3; the publishing rights were handed to Rockstar Games by September 2006, though no platforms were specified. An early cinematic trailer was released in October 2006. Rockstar's parent company Take-Two Interactive acknowledged the game in June 2007, listing it for release in the 2008 fiscal year (October 2007 – September 2008) for the PlayStation 3; the game subsequently received several delays: first to the 2009 fiscal year, then to September 2010, and later to the first half of 2011, which was later narrowed down to 17 May 2011 for North America, and 20 May for Australia and Europe.

The game was the subject of Game Informer's cover story for its March 2010 issue. The debut trailer was released in November 2010, revealing the game would release in early 2011 for PlayStation 3 and Xbox 360. A development video was released in December 2010, demonstrating MotionScan and featuring interviews with the cast and developers. The game's cover art was unveiled on 23 February 2011. The game was exhibited at PAX East in March 2011 with an exclusive theatre presentation. The final pre-launch trailer was released on 11 May 2011. To spur pre-order game sales, Rockstar collaborated with several retail outlets to provide pre-order bonuses. Rockstar also ran a competition to win a trip to Los Angeles to attend the Festival of Film Noir at the Grauman's Egyptian Theatre, and play the game a month before its release. In April 2011, L.A. Noire was honoured as an official selection at the Tribeca Film Festival, the first video game to do so.

Rockstar partnered with Mulholland Books to publish L.A. Noire: The Collected Stories on 6 June 2011, featuring a collection of eight short stories in the L.A. Noire universe written by noted crime authors, including Lawrence Block, Joe R. Lansdale, Joyce Carol Oates, Francine Prose, and Andrew Vachss. The collection, edited and curated by Jonathan Santlofer, was completed in six weeks. Some of the writers—including Megan Abbott, Duane Swierczynski, and Santlofer—previewed an hour of the game for inspiration at Rockstar's headquarters in New York. Rockstar originally rejected Santlofer's story as it spoiled some of the game's narrative; he began to write a second story before deciding to rewrite the first without spoilers. Rockstar released an excerpt and five full stories before the game's release in May 2011.

Rockstar announced a re-release of the game in September 2017 for Nintendo Switch, PlayStation 4, and Xbox One; it was released on 14 November 2017. Developed by Virtuos, the enhanced version features finer texture details, upgraded weather effects, and new camera angles; the Switch version also features gyroscopic controls with the Joy-Con. Rockstar also announced L.A. Noire: The VR Case Files, a subset of seven of the game's cases for virtual reality support through the HTC Vive. Developed by Video Games Deluxe, a new studio founded by McNamara, the game was released on 15 December 2017, following a delay from November; support for Oculus Rift devices was added on 4 April 2018, and the game was released for PlayStation VR on 25 September 2019.

=== Additional content ===
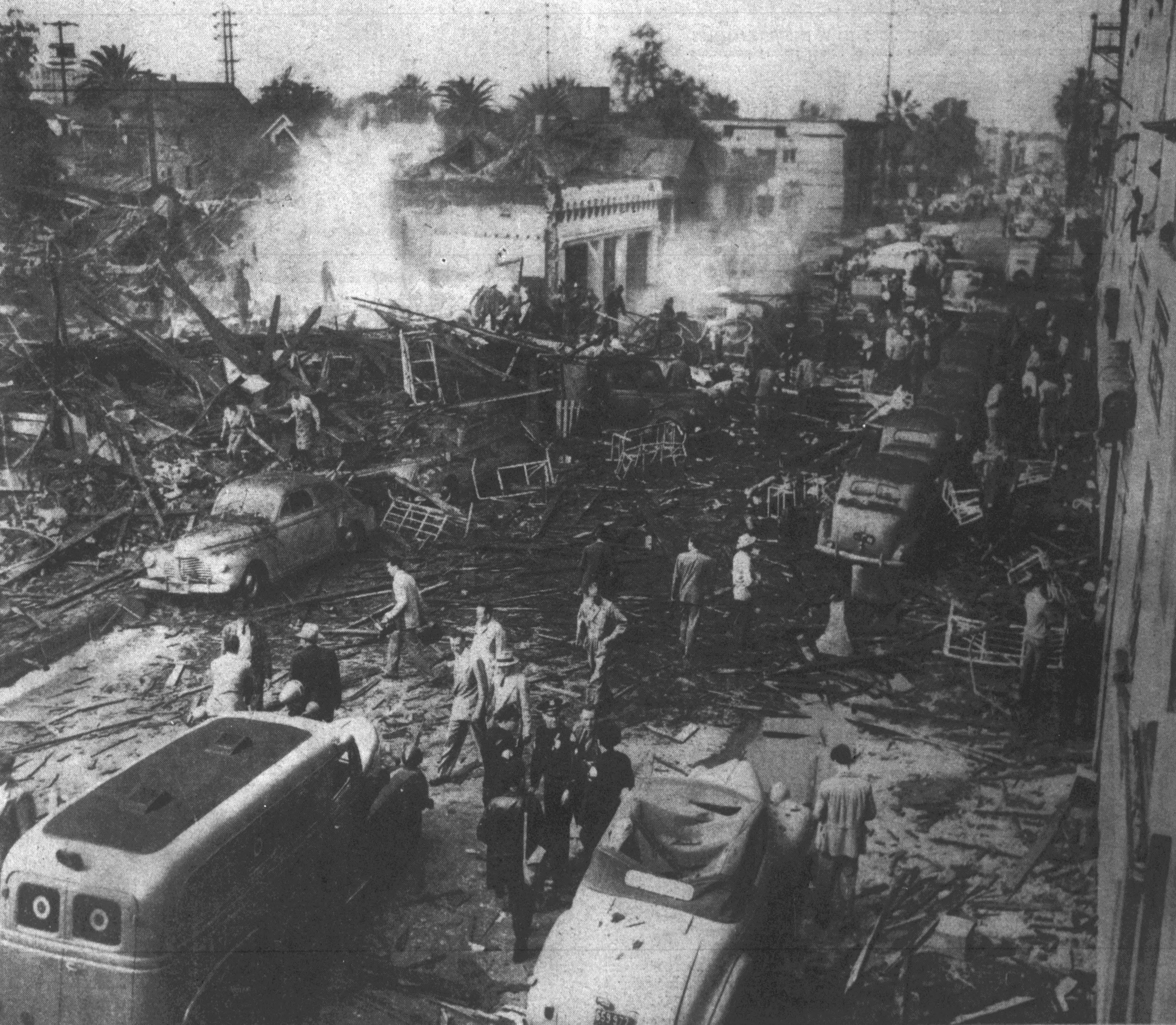
The "Nicholson Electroplating" DLC was based on the 1947 explosion of the O'Connor Electro-Plating company.

Rockstar announced it would release several pieces of downloadable content (DLC) for L.A. Noire, available for pre-purchase with the "Rockstar Pass"—one of the first season passes in video games—which also included all in-game pre-order bonuses. Five cases were released as DLC: "The Naked City" and "A Slip of the Tongue" on 31 May (also as pre-order bonuses), a Vice case inspired by the 1948 film and a Traffic case about motor vehicle theft, respectively; "Nicholson Electroplating" on 21 June, an Arson case based on the O'Connor Plating Works disaster; "Reefer Madness" on 12 July, a Vice case about reefer operations; and "The Consul's Car" on 26 July, originally a PlayStation 3-exclusive Traffic case.

Rockstar announced L.A. Noire: The Complete Edition for Windows in September 2011, containing all DLC and featuring some gameplay and technical enhancements; it was released on 8 November in North America and 11 November in Australia and Europe, followed by a release on PlayStation 3 and Xbox 360 on 15 November.

== Reception ==
=== Critical response ===
PlayStation 3 and Xbox 360 version

Aggregate score
Aggregator	Score
Metacritic	89/100

Review scores
Publication	Score
Edge	8/10
Eurogamer	8/10
Game Informer	8.75/10
GamePro	5/5
GameSpot	9/10
GameSpy	4.5/5
GameZone	8.5/10
Giant Bomb	5/5
IGN	8.5/10
The Guardian	5/5

L.A. Noire received "generally favorable reviews" from critics, according to review aggregator Metacritic. It was praised for its facial animation, narrative, characters and performances, music, world design, and interrogation gameplay, though responses to the shooting and driving mechanics were mixed. The Guardian's Steve Boxer described it as a "breakthrough for games"; Edge felt most elements are achieved better by other games but "few developers have brought such a diffuse set of genres together so atmospherically, stylishly or cohesively". GameTrailers wrote it "sets a new standard for storytelling in video games", though noted some overall limitations compared to other games.

Reviewers praised the game's facial animation, with several calling it the best in any video game. GameTrailers wrote "it allows a level of emoting that's never been seen in interactive entertainment". Matt Liebl of GameZone felt the interrogation mechanic would have been unrealistic without the use of MotionScan. Joystiq's Justin McElroy considered the technology "nothing short of revolutionary", noting it allowed the player to view "an actor's entire performance"; Edge found it added a "human element" to the interrogations. Some reviewers found the body animations failed to match the faces—sometimes failing to bridge the uncanny valley—but felt the effect added to the realism and subtlety of performances.

GameSpy's Ryan Scott considered L.A. Noire to be "one of the strongest stories Rockstar's ever published", and Giant Bomb's Brad Shoemaker called it "among the best in the business", citing its cohesiveness and tension near its climax. Liebl of GameZone thought the focus on narrative and performances excelled the game over Rockstar's action-oriented titles. Boxer of The Guardian praised the narrative's pacing and arc; Carolyn Petit of GameSpot found the game's later chapters made the slower pace of the early story more worthy. GamePro's Will Herring similarly lauded the game's final act, noting the narrative's accuracy in its portrayal of Los Angeles; conversely, some reviewers felt the game became less interesting towards the end and some found it became repetitive. Hilary Goldstein of IGN wrote the cases that strayed from the formula—particularly the Homicide desk—were among the best, though noted the game failed to reach the emotional heights of Heavy Rain.

Petit of GameSpot found Phelps's character development "fascinating", and Herring of GamePro wrote his rapport with his partners made the game more interesting. GamesRadar's Mikel Reparaz considered Phelps more likable as the game progressed. Giant Bomb's Shoemaker felt the characters' dialogue made them feel appropriate to the setting. Polygon's Owen S. Good found Biggs's moral code and reignited interest in justice a crucial personification of the noir theme. Critics lauded the cast's performances, with particular praise for Aaron Staton, John Noble, Andrew Connolly, and Michael McGrady; Edge felt Connolly "dominated any scene he's in". Some reviewers found the performances made the characters feel more believable and convincing; IGN's Goldstein praised the actors' mannerisms. Ryan McCaffrey of Official Xbox Magazine (OXM) wrote the performances made it "a hell of a great drama to watch unfold"; similarly, McElroy of Joystiq felt they made it one of the "most compelling video game stories ever". Eurogamer's Oli Welsh wrote Staton "does his best with a dry character".

The recreation of Los Angeles in L.A. Noire received praise, considered by many critics to be the "star" of the game.

Many reviewers found Los Angeles to be the "star" of the game, with praise directed at the generally accurate recreation of the city in 1947. Eurogamer's Welsh compared it to Rockstar's Grand Theft Auto: San Andreas (2004) and Midnight Club: Los Angeles (2008), noting "it's the fastidious period detail that really impresses this time". Shoemaker of Giant Bomb wrote the historical elements greatly benefited the overall tone and atmosphere, granting authenticity to the narrative. GamePro's Herring called it "one of the richest and most impressively rendered video game environments". Matt Helgeson of Game Informer lauded the attention to detail but felt it lacked the feeling of interactivity of Liberty City from Rockstar's Grand Theft Auto IV (2008). Petit of GameSpot said the "outstanding" art direction made the game more memorable but the believability of the open world was marred by the awkward dialogue of the non-playable pedestrians.

Reviewers lauded the game's original score. Welsh of Eurogamer opined it contributed to the overall atmosphere, comparing it favourably to the "ominous swells" of Taxi Driver (1976) and the "signature muted brass" of L.A. Confidential (1997). GameSpot's Petit concurred it successfully evoked some of the best music of film noir, and Joystiq's McElroy praised its authenticity to the time period. Helgeson of Game Informer felt the game effectively balances jazz tracks from the 1940s with a "mournful score". Giant Bomb's Shoemaker wrote the "big-orchestra score feels completely appropriate for the setting and subject matter", and appreciated the music notes used during investigations.

Game Informer's Helgeson considered the interrogations "the most compelling aspect of L.A. Noire"; IGN's Goldstein concurred, comparing them to dialogue-heavy scenes from role-playing games. Shoemaker of Giant Bomb favourably compared the interrogations to the dialogue choices of Mass Effect 2, noting they provide new energy to each case. Petit of GameSpot found the interrogations became more interesting once the player received more autonomy. OXM's McCaffrey appreciated the "vigor" brought to the game by the interrogations but criticised their passive nature of simply listening and pressing a single button. Some reviewers considered the system flawed due to its vague and sometimes illogical choices. Critics were divided on the game's investigation elements: GameSpot's Petit called it "compelling" and praised the rich details, while Eurogamer's Welsh called it "clunky" and "laborious"; Helgeson of Game Informer felt they became repetitive over the course of the game, feeling "more like an Easter egg hunt than an actual investigation", while Liebl of GameZone criticised the lack of significant penalty.

Several critics commented on the game's action sequences and driving controls. Eurogamer's Welsh found the foot-chases to be "memorable and fun", comparing them to police television shows, while Game Informer's Helgeson wrote they became "predictable and repetitive". Most reviewers considered the core gameplay simple to understand, though GameZone's Liebl felt this lessened the experience, and GameTrailers described the controls as "floaty" and "imprecise". Petit of GameSpot found the cars to be "responsible and swift", and Shoemaker of Giant Bomb called the car chases his favourite aspect of the action sequences; other reviewers generally concurred, though some felt the driving was less impressive outside of car chases. Critics generally agreed the game's shooting mechanics were competent but simple; some found the controls awkward or repetitive, while others considered it lacklustre compared to Rockstar's Grand Theft Auto and Red Dead Redemption. GamePro's Herring, however, called it "memorable" and "rewarding".

Windows version

Aggregate score
Aggregator	Score
Metacritic	83/100

Review scores
Publication	Score
Gamekult	7/10
GameSpot	9/10
GameSpy	3/5
IGN	8.5/10

L.A. Noire's Windows release also received "generally favorable reviews", according to Metacritic. GameSpot's Petit considered it the best version of the game due to the inclusion of all DLC cases. Carlos Leiva of Vandal lauded the higher resolution textures, increased draw distances, additional environmental designs, and stable performance. Nathan Grayson of GameSpy appreciated the improvements but ultimately considered it "a pretty bare-bones PC port"; Tommaso Pugliese of Multiplayer.it echoed this sentiment, feeling the changes from the console release were minimal and the controls were made worse with a keyboard and mouse. Anthony Gallegos of IGN felt the port could use additional optimisation, citing some technical problems; Matthieu Hurel of Gamekult was similarly disappointed by the lack of improvements in the Windows version. Will Garrido of FiringSquad criticised the port's performance, controls, lack of graphical improvements, and required installation of the Rockstar Games Social Club, and wrote the game crashed several times.

==== Re-release ====
Re-release

Aggregate score
Aggregator	Score		
Aggregator	NS	PS4	Xbox One
Metacritic	79/100	76/100	77/100

Review scores
Publication	Score		
Publication	NS	PS4	Xbox One
GameSpot	7/10		
GameZone	8.5/10		8/10
IGN	8/10		
PlayStation Official Magazine – UK		7/10	
Official Xbox Magazine (UK)			7/10
Push Square		8/10	

L.A. Noire's re-release on Nintendo Switch, PlayStation 4, and Xbox One received "generally favorable reviews", according to Metacritic. Sam Brooke of Push Square wrote the re-release was "certainly worth its asking price", and Matt Espineli of GameSpot declared "it's well worth replaying or experiencing for the first time". Gameplanet's Toby Berger considered the Switch version an effective showcase for the console.

The graphical upgrades divided critics—some felt the re-release had significantly upgraded the original game, while others felt it contained few differences, especially on the Nintendo Switch version—though most concurred the Switch version suffered from some dips in frame rate or other performance issues; Berger of Gameplanet felt it "doesn't occur often enough to detract much from the overall experience". Push Square's Brooke appreciated the upgraded visuals, particularly praising the new lighting engine. Some critics noted the sharper textures and increased draw distances had emphasised the game's outdated visuals; Ben Tyrer of PlayStation Official Magazine – UK (OPM) felt the facial capture looked "low-res when compared to the rest of the world", and Dave Meikleham of OXM said the increased visuals "can't disguise" the poor character design.

The addition of Joy-Con controls and touchscreen support for the Nintendo Switch also divided critics. Cody Perez of GameRevolution considered the Joy-Con controls a "welcome addition" and felt the touchscreen support made the investigations more user friendly; Simone Pettine of Multiplayer.it corroborated the latter, stating the game's existence on the Switch proved it was possible for other games. Destructoid's Chris Carter was intrigued by the touchscreen controls, while IGN's Alanah Pearce found the motion controls "precise enough" to correspond with the in-game animations. Conversely, Chris James of Pocket Gamer called the Switch controls "lazy and pointless", questioning why Rockstar highlighted them in the game's marketing. Some reviewers noted a preference for the original controller setup.

Some critics commented on the additions and changes to the re-releases. Push Square's Brooke considered the change of the interrogation responses to be "more fitting" to Phelps's dialogue. Damien McFerran of Nintendo Life and Espineli of GameSpot found the change was an improvement but they remained too vague; several other critics concurred the responses were ambiguous. OPM's Tyrer named the addition of the Photo Mode a highlight of the re-release, while Multiplayer.it's Tommaso Pugliese found it misplaced.

==== The VR Case Files ====
The VR Case Files

Aggregate score
Aggregator	Score
Metacritic	(PC) 82/100 (PS4) 81/100

Review scores
Publication	Score
Destructoid	9/10
GameSpot	8/10
GameStar	81/100
IGN	8.5/10

L.A. Noire: The VR Case Files received "generally favorable reviews", according to Metacritic. Dan Stapleton of IGN concluded it felt "less like a port and more like something that was always meant to be played this way", while Jimmy Thang of GameSpot said it "raises the bar for what a good VR port should look like". The Telegraph's Tom Hoggins called it an "interesting, reactive, and largely accomplished virtual reality adaption" of the game, and Gamer.nl's Wilbert Meetsma compared it to a greatest hits album.

Several critics praised the control scheme in virtual reality. GameSpot's Thang found it made the player reconsider the evidence they discover, and The Telegraph's Hoggins felt the exploration "makes a great deal more sense". Meetsma of Gamer.nl considered the walking mechanic an effective illusion; Alfonso Arribas of Vandal appreciated the control scheme's realism. Conversely, some critics found the movement controls were unreliable or imprecise; Lukas Schmid and Rebecca Döllner of PC Games criticised the HTC Vive controllers and the game's unpredictable object physics.

Driving in The VR Case Files received mixed responses; some critics found it accurate and well-designed, and others unsuccessful and gimmicky.

GameSpot's Thang found the driving controls "works as well as you'd hope", particularly applauding the chase sequences. Meetsma of Gamer.nl similarly felt the driving controls were well-designed, and Alfonso Arribas of Vandal wrote they were precise and the sensitivity appropriate. In contrast, IGN's Stapleton found them to be "imprecise but goofy fun to pantomime"; Daniel Feith of GameStar said it was realistic but ultimately felt like a gimmick he eventually skipped. The Telegraph's Hoggins considered the driving to be the least successful feature of The VR Case Files, though praised its detail, and PC Games's Schmid and Döllner criticised it as uncomfortable.

Meetsma of Gamer.nl described the fistfights as one of the better elements of the game, despite taking up a small portion. GameStar's Feith similarly found them enjoyable due to the simulated areas. GameSpot's Thang favourably compared the fistfights to a boxing minigame, deeming it appropriate and satisfying. Hoggins of The Telegraph found them "pleasingly physical" but "a little clumsy", noting a preference for the gunfights. Vandal's Arribas considered the shooting mechanics to be credible and precise, while IGN's Stapleton called it "pretty simple shooting gallery stuff" but respected the smaller details and gameplay features; GameSpot's Feith felt that the aiming was "imprecise".

IGN's Stapleton praised the visuals of The VR Case Files, noting the new perspective grants more appreciation of the development and design and the facial animations are enhanced by the closer angle. GameSpot's Thang wrote "the graphics and artstyle work wonderfully in VR". Meetsma of Gamer.nl felt the facial animations remained effective but the overall design was less impressive, especially with the game's demanding system requirements; Feith of GameStar found the faces had weakened in virtual reality. Vandal's Arribas opined the graphics had worsened with age, emphasised by the perspective of virtual reality; PC Games's Schmid and Döllner similarly felt the game looked worse than the recent re-release, citing poor textures and performance issues.

=== Accolades ===
L.A. Noire received nominations and awards from gaming publications. It was nominated for Ultimate Game of the Year and Best Action/Adventure at the Golden Joystick Awards, and for Best Graphics at the Spike Video Game Awards. The game received nine nominations at the 15th Annual Interactive Achievement Awards, and three at the 12th Game Developers Choice Awards. It was nominated for four awards at the 10th Annual Game Audio Network Guild Awards, of which it won Music of the Year. Along with Batman: Arkham City, it received the most nominations at the 8th British Academy Games Awards with eight, including Best Game and Performer for Staton; it ultimately won for Original Music. Andrew and Simon Hale were nominated for Best Original Score for a Video Game or Interactive Media at the International Film Music Critics Association Awards. The game was nominated for four awards by GameSpot, and won Best Atmosphere. L.A. Noire appeared on some lists of the best games of 2011, including Ars Technica, CNET, CNN, GameSpot, The Guardian, Kotaku Australia, and NPR. The game's 2017 re-release was nominated for Best Remake/Remaster from IGN, and for the Freedom Tower Award for Best Remake at the 7th Annual New York Game Awards. The VR Case Files was nominated for Best VR Audio at the 16th Annual Game Audio Network Guild Awards.

Award	Date	Category	Recipient(s) and nominee(s)	Result	Ref.
Golden Joystick Awards	21 October 2011	Ultimate Game of the Year	L.A. Noire	Nominated	
Golden Joystick Awards	21 October 2011	Best Action/Adventure	L.A. Noire	Nominated	
Spike Video Game Awards	10 December 2011	Best Graphics	L.A. Noire	Nominated	
Interactive Achievement Awards	9 February 2012	Adventure Game of the Year	L.A. Noire	Nominated	
Interactive Achievement Awards	9 February 2012	Outstanding Achievement in Animation	L.A. Noire	Nominated	
Interactive Achievement Awards	9 February 2012	Outstanding Achievement in Character Performance	Aaron Staton as Cole Phelps	Nominated	
Interactive Achievement Awards	9 February 2012	Outstanding Achievement in Game Direction	L.A. Noire	Nominated	
Interactive Achievement Awards	9 February 2012	Outstanding Achievement in Original Music Composition	L.A. Noire	Nominated	
Interactive Achievement Awards	9 February 2012	Outstanding Achievement in Sound Design	L.A. Noire	Nominated	
Interactive Achievement Awards	9 February 2012	Outstanding Achievement in Story	L.A. Noire	Nominated	
Interactive Achievement Awards	9 February 2012	Outstanding Achievement in Visual Engineering	L.A. Noire	Nominated	
Interactive Achievement Awards	9 February 2012	Outstanding Innovation in Gaming	L.A. Noire	Nominated	
International Film Music Critics Association Awards	23 February 2012	Best Original Score for a Video Game or Interactive Media	Andrew Hale and Simon Hale	Nominated	
Game Developers Choice Awards	7 March 2012	Best Debut	Team Bondi	Nominated	
Game Developers Choice Awards	7 March 2012	Best Technology	L.A. Noire	Nominated	
Game Developers Choice Awards	7 March 2012	Innovation Award	L.A. Noire	Nominated	
Game Audio Network Guild Awards	8 March 2012	Music of the Year	L.A. Noire	Won	
Game Audio Network Guild Awards	8 March 2012	Best Dialogue	L.A. Noire	Nominated	
Game Audio Network Guild Awards	8 March 2012	Best Original Vocal Song – Pop	"Torched Song"	Nominated	
Game Audio Network Guild Awards	8 March 2012	Best Audio Mix	L.A. Noire	Nominated	
British Academy Games Awards	16 March 2012	Original Music	L.A. Noire	Won	
British Academy Games Awards	16 March 2012	Artistic Achievement	L.A. Noire	Nominated	
British Academy Games Awards	16 March 2012	Best Game	L.A. Noire	Nominated	
British Academy Games Awards	16 March 2012	Debut Game	L.A. Noire	Nominated	
British Academy Games Awards	16 March 2012	Game Innovation	L.A. Noire	Nominated	
British Academy Games Awards	16 March 2012	Performer	Aaron Staton as Cole Phelps	Nominated	
British Academy Games Awards	16 March 2012	Story	L.A. Noire	Nominated	
British Academy Games Awards	16 March 2012	GAME Award of 2011	L.A. Noire	Nominated	
New York Game Awards	24 January 2018	Freedom Tower Award for Best Remake	L.A. Noire (Switch and VR)	Nominated	
Game Audio Network Guild Awards	22 March 2018	Best VR Audio	L.A. Noire: The VR Case Files	Nominated	

== Sales ==
On the day of the North American release, Take-Two Interactive's shares closed up 7.75%—a three-year high for the company—which was attributed to the game's positive reception. The game shipped four million units across both platforms in its first month. In the United States, L.A. Noire was the best-selling game in May 2011, selling 899,000 copies across both platforms, which Wedbush Securities considered lower than its estimate of one million units. It was the best-selling game in June 2011, but had dropped out of the top ten by July. McNamara felt pressure for the game to sell well—The Getaway sold four million units—and he was ultimately satisfied with its commercial performance. The game had shipped almost five million copies by December 2011, and approximately 7.5 million copies by September 2017.

The game topped the charts in the United Kingdom following its release, becoming the fastest-selling new intellectual property; 58% of copies sold on Xbox 360, and 42% on PlayStation 3. It remained atop the chart for three weeks, pushed to second place upon the release of Duke Nukem Forever in June 2011; it remained within the top ten of the weekly charts until mid-July. It was the eighth-best-selling game of 2011 in the United Kingdom. In Australia, video game retailers in major cities reported the game was out of stock within a week. Within its first week on sale in Japan, L.A. Noire sold over 71,000 copies; the PlayStation 3 topped the charts with 58,436 copies, while the Xbox 360 version placed 11th with 12,621 copies.

== Future ==
Following L.A. Noire's release in May 2011, McNamara claimed future Team Bondi games would take less than five years to develop due to the existing technology, with MotionScan set to expand to full body performance. Team Bondi's assets were acquired by film production company Kennedy Miller Mitchell in August, and it was placed into administration on 30 August, and entered liquidation on 5 October. McNamara's next game, Whore of the Orient, was announced in November as a spiritual successor to L.A. Noire, in development by KMM Interactive Entertainment. A prospective publisher departed the project in late 2012, followed by layoffs in 2013; its cancellation was confirmed in 2016. At Video Games Deluxe, McNamara and some Team Bondi alumni worked on The VR Case Files (2017) and post-release development of Grand Theft Auto: The Trilogy – The Definitive Edition (2021). The company was acquired by Rockstar in 2025 and renamed Rockstar Australia.

In May 2011, Take-Two CEO Strauss Zelnick called L.A. Noire "another strong franchise for this company"; in November, he said the game was Take-Two's "most successful new release" in the past fiscal year and reiterated its importance to the company. Rockstar said in February 2012 it was "considering what the future may hold for L.A. Noire as a series" but said not to "count out" a possible sequel. The following year, in March 2013, Take-Two COO Karl Slatoff reiterated L.A. Noire was an important franchise to the company. In May 2021, Aaron Staton said he "never heard word about a sequel" but "would be curious what they would tell" due to Phelps's death.

== Bibliography ==
- Bogenn, Tim; Barba, Rick (20 May 2011). L.A. Noire Signature Series Guide. United States of America: BradyGames. ISBN 978-0744012545.
- L.A. Noire (PDF) (manual). United States of America: Rockstar Games. 14 November 2017. Archived (PDF) from the original on 12 December 2019.
