= Whore of the Orient =

Cancelled video game

- Developer: KMM Interactive Entertainment
- Platforms: PlayStation 4; Windows; Xbox One
- Release: Cancelled
- Genre: Action-adventure

Whore of the Orient is a cancelled action-adventure game for PlayStation 4, Windows, and Xbox One. The game was in development at KMM Interactive Entertainment, a subsidiary of Kennedy Miller Mitchell that comprised employees from defunct development houses Team Bondi and Krome Studios. In 2012, the game was targeting a 2015 release, but was confirmed cancelled in 2016, having not had a status update since 2013.

== Setting ==
Set in 1936, the game would have centered around the corrupt city of Shanghai in the hands of Western powers, filled with mob crime and political troubles. The Kuomintang ruthlessly puts down labour movements in an effort to suppress communism, while the International Police Force attempt to maintain peace.

== Development ==
The only screenshot released for Whore of the Orient

Following the release of L.A. Noire (2011), Team Bondi sought partnerships with other studios for their next title, similar to their former partnership with Rockstar Games. It was reported that no studios were interested in forming a partnership due to prior claims of unethical working practices at Team Bondi. In August 2011, Kennedy Miller Mitchell (KMM) bought Team Bondi's assets and intellectual property, and staff were given the option to join KMM. The team was absorbed into KMM Interactive Entertainment, a subsidiary of Kennedy Miller Mitchell, and development on Whore of the Orient continued. Warner Bros. Interactive Entertainment was said to have pulled out from their interest in the project sometime in late 2012. In April 2013, it was rumoured that the former Team Bondi team was laid off, and that the game was put on hold. Doug Mitchell of Kennedy Miller Mitchell released a comment stating that the company had not given up on the project, and that they were still seeking the right investor, neither confirming nor denying the status of the former Team Bondi team. In June of that year, KMM received A$200,000 worth of funding for the project from Screen NSW, an Australian trade and investment board.

The game was suggested to be a narrative action adventure title similar to L.A. Noire, and the proprietary facial MotionScan technology would also be reused. Early unfinished gameplay footage was leaked in August 2013, depicting the combat-style action. The title of the game was criticised in September 2013; Jieh-Yung Lo, a City of Monash Councillor, felt that the word "Orient" disgraces Chinese culture, and is "very similar to the N-word for African American communities".

In June 2016, an interview with Whore of the Orient producer Derek Proud revealed that the game was effectively cancelled. Proud revealed that the team fought to "the bitter end", but they were unable to save the game and ultimately it was "wrapped-up" by parent company KMM.

In July 2026, writer Daniel McMahon revealed in a documentary about L.A. Noire and Whore of the Orient's developments that the game was only "10 - 15%" completed when it was cancelled, and the team had only developed enough content for a vertical slice. McMahon noted that the team was still exploring concepts for what the game would become, and much of it was still speculative. Some of the gameplay concepts the team was exploring included a language system where the protagonist would not initially speak the native language, but would gradually learn Mandarin Chinese as part of a progression or XP system. Additionally, there would have been an emphasis on actively being a policeman and stopping crimes as they happened as opposed to solving mysteries like in L.A. Noire.

McMahon also confirmed that Whore of the Orient would've expanded on L.A. Noire's conversation system, though it would've allowed for more branching paths. Players would have been able to choose whether they thought someone was telling the truth or lying, but then they would be able to make a "strategic choice" on how to handle that. They could either bully a suspect or gently coax it out of them, which would have varying results. McMahon noted that instead of a singular "right" answer, Whore of the Orient would've had "gradations" which would effect how much information a suspect would volunteer.

"If you hit the suspect just right, you would get the entire truth revealed to you," said McMahon. "If you tried strategies in the middle, you might get an address or a name, and then you would have to go find more suspects and put more information together with."

The hand-to-hand combat system planned for the game was inspired by the Batman: Arkham series, as well as a real combat technique known as Defendu.
