= The Clean Machine =

- Directed by: Ken Cameron
- Written by: Ken Cameron; Terry Hayes; Richard Mortlock
- Produced by: Terry Hayes; Doug Mitchell; George Miller
- Starring: Steve Bisley; Grigor Taylor; Ed Devereaux
- Cinematography: Dean Semler
- Production company: Kennedy Miller
- Distributed by: Network Ten
- Release date: 22 May 1988
- Running time: 90 minutes
- Country: Australia
- Language: English

The Clean Machine is a 1988 Australian tele movie about police corruption starring Steve Bisley. It was one of four telemovies made by Kennedy Miller around this time, the others being The Riddle of the Stinson, The Damien Parer Story and The Year My Voice Broke (which was released theatrically).

== Plot ==
Inspector Eddie Riordan is appointed to head a new anti-corruption squad.

== Cast ==
- Steve Bisley as Inspector Eddie Riordan
- Grigor Taylor as Detective Sgt. Warren Davis
- Ed Devereaux
- Reginal Gaigulas as Veronica Riordan
- Tim Robertson as Dr Michael Millius
- Peter Kowitz as Stewart Byrne
- Sandy Gore as Marcia Irving
- Marshall Napier as Keith Reid
- Edwin Hodgeman as Max Newell

== Production ==
The film was written by Terry Hayes and Richard Mortlock, who were both former journalists. "Police corruption is an insidiuous and evil thing which disgusts us all," said Hayes. "I'd given up on politicians doing anything about it. This way I can at least channel my rage into a story."

The director was Ken Cameron who later recalled:

They asked me did I want to make it on 35mm. Now, I've always wondered whether I made a big mistake by not doing it on 35mm. But I don't think it would have been a success in the cinema. It wouldn't have had the density that it had on television. In terms of big screen, I could not have had the production values; the money wouldn't have stretched that far. So I don't know. There's a turning point. You never know what these turning points mean. But I knew one of the factors was that we didn't have Mel Gibson in the lead. I think Steve's terrific in it, but to release it as a movie in that genre, you almost needed Mel or a star.

Cameron did say doing the film revived his career after the box office failure of The Umbrella Woman.

== Reception ==
The Sydney Morning Herald called it "easily Kennedy Miller's best production to date... simply excellent.""

Bisley won the Best Actor in a One-off Drama accolade at the 1988 Penguin Awards.
