= O'Connor Plating Works disaster =

1947 industrial explosion in Los Angeles

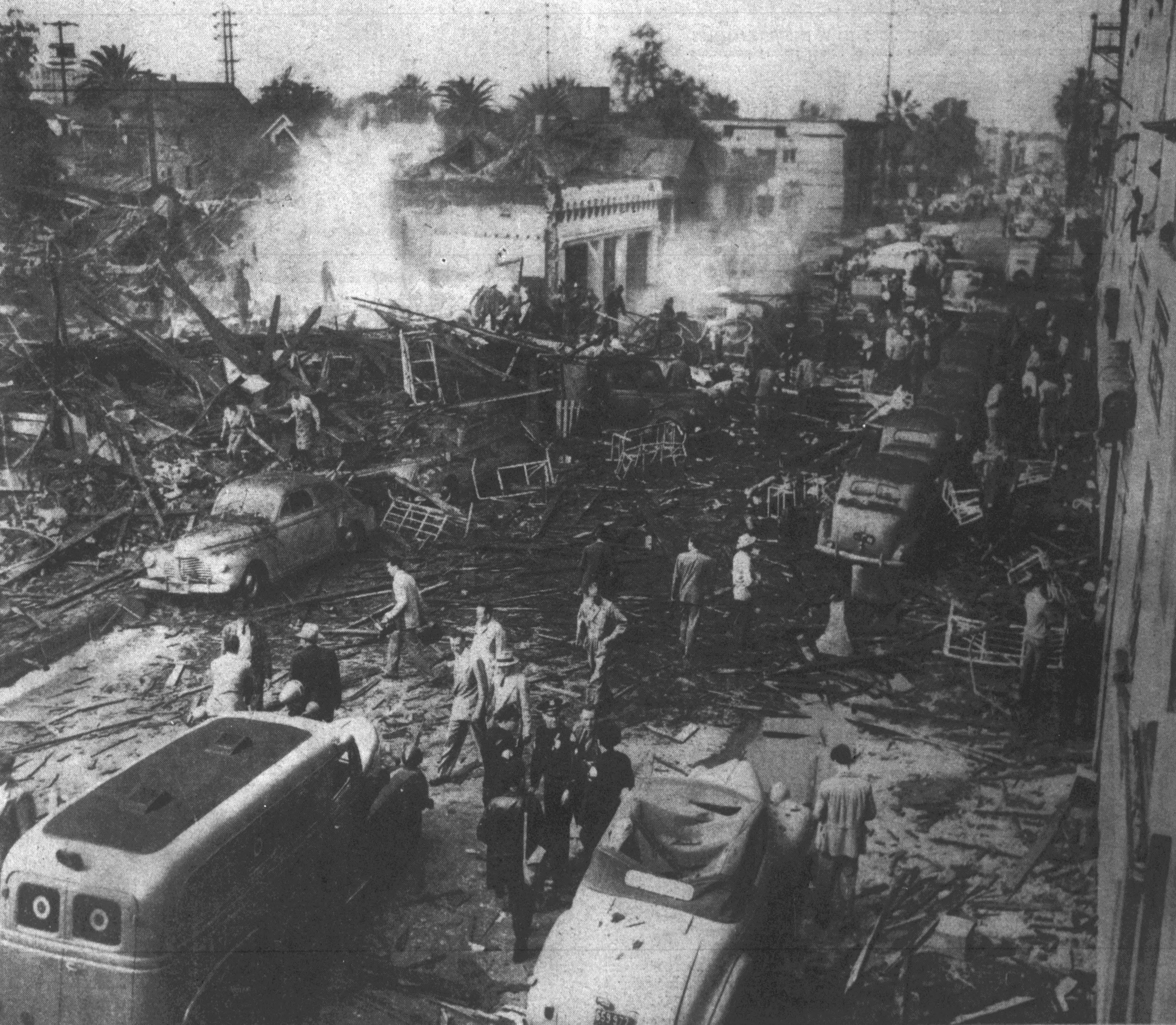
- Front page image of the Los Angeles Daily News on February 20, 1947
- Location: 926 E Pico Blvd Los Angeles, CA 90021 United States; 34.03099°N 118.25030°W
- Deaths: 17
- Injuries: 100+

On February 20, 1947, a large accidental explosion at the O'Connor Plating Works at 926 East Pico Boulevard in Los Angeles killed seventeen people and injured more than one hundred. Eleven nearby buildings were damaged beyond repair. Press reports mentioned a 25-foot (7.6 m) crater.

The explosion was caused by the improper handling of perchloric acid, which the plant was using as an experimental method for polishing aluminum. On the day of the accident, the cooling unit required to store perchloric acid safely was not working. A vessel of 130 US gallons (490 L) of the chemical was boiling and may have ignited when a plastic rack was lowered into it.

== In popular culture ==
The event served as the main inspiration for "Nicholson Electroplating", a fictional case featured in the 2011 video game L.A. Noire.

== See also ==
- SS Sansinena, an oil tanker that exploded in Los Angeles in 1976
