= Noah Taylor =

British actor (born 1969)

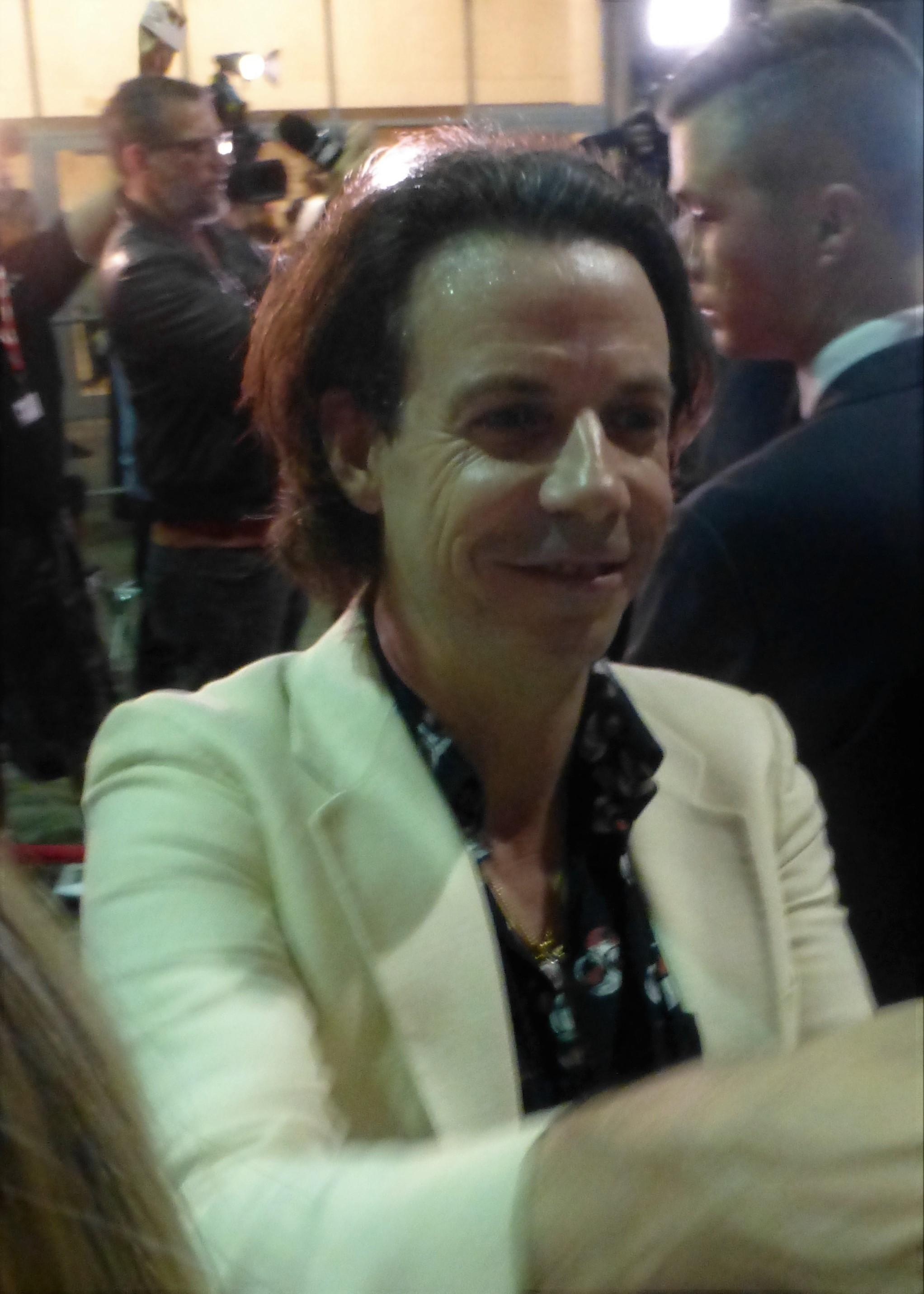
- Taylor in 2016
- Born: Noah George Taylor; 4 September 1969 (age 57); London, England
- Occupation: Actor
- Years active: 1987–present
- Spouse: Dionne Harris (m. 2012)
- Children: 1

Noah George Taylor (born 4 September 1969) is a British actor. The accolades he has received include nominations for three Screen Actors Guild Awards, a Critics' Choice Award, and four AACTA Awards. Taylor is best known for his roles as teenage David Helfgott in Shine, Locke in the HBO series Game of Thrones, Darby Sabini in the BBC One series Peaky Blinders, Mr. Bucket in Charlie and the Chocolate Factory and Danny in the Australian cult film He Died with a Felafel in His Hand. Taylor also starred as Adolf Hitler in both the American television series Preacher and the 2002 film Max. In 2023, he starred as Dr. Friedrich "Fritz" Pfeffer in A Small Light.

== Early life ==
Taylor, the elder of two sons, was born on 4 September 1969 in London to Australian parents, Maggie (née Miller), a journalist and book editor, and Paul Taylor, a copywriter and journalist. His parents returned to Australia when Taylor was five, and he grew up in Clifton Hill and St Kilda, suburbs of Melbourne.

After performing in plays at St Martins Youth Arts Centre in South Yarra for a year, Taylor gained the attention of director John Duigan, who cast him in the 1987 film The Year My Voice Broke, the first part of a planned trilogy. Taylor also appeared in its sequel, Flirting (1991), alongside Thandiwe Newton with Nicole Kidman and Naomi Watts in supporting roles.

== Career ==
=== Film ===
Taylor's early screen roles included playing the lead in the critically acclaimed The Year My Voice Broke and Flirting, and he gained significant international attention playing the tormented young pianist David Helfgott in the 1996 film Shine. Taylor's résumé includes action movies (Lara Croft: Tomb Raider and Tomb Raider – The Cradle of Life), comedies (The Life Aquatic with Steve Zissou), psychological thrillers (Vanilla Sky and Predestination) and historical dramas (Max, in which he played the young Adolf Hitler). He also played the role of Adolf Hitler in AMC's series Preacher.

Taylor once commented in an interview that he was sick of acting out the nostalgic reminiscences of other people. He has done this in a number of films including The Nostradamus Kid, which was based on the early life of the Australian author Bob Ellis, a young David Helfgott in Shine, the protagonist in John Birmingham's memoir He Died with a Felafel in His Hand, and Almost Famous, based on the memories of the film's writer and director, Cameron Crowe.

In 2005, Taylor appeared in Tim Burton's Charlie and the Chocolate Factory. Five years later, Taylor starred in Simon Rumley's mystery thriller Red White & Blue, which had its world premiere as part of the SXSW Film Festival in March 2010.

=== Television ===
In 2013, Taylor appeared in both the third and fourth seasons of HBO's epic fantasy series Game of Thrones, based on the A Song of Ice and Fire book series by George R. R. Martin. In the adaptation, Taylor plays the character of Locke, an original character of the television series, who serves as a condensed version of several characters of the books, most notably the ruthless and sadistic mercenary leader Vargo Hoat.

=== Music video appearances ===
Taylor has appeared in a small number of music videos. One of his earliest screen performances was in the video for Beargarden's song The Finer Things. This video was directed by Richard Lowenstein, who then cast Taylor in a supporting role in the film Dogs in Space. Much later, he appeared in the video of "Fifteen Feet of Pure White Snow", a song by Nick Cave and the Bad Seeds, along with the video for M.O.R. by British alternative rock group Blur. Taylor also played a young Romeo in the video "Romeos" from Alphaville.

=== Music ===
Taylor has also performed and recorded as a musician. In 2001, he released an album Popular Music for All Peoples under the name 'C.B.M.' (Cardboard Box Man) and in 2011, an EP Live Free or Die!!! as Noah Taylor & the Sloppy Boys on Z-Man Records.

== Personal life ==
When not acting, Taylor draws and paints, and is also an accomplished musician, playing viola and French horn as a young teenager, and guitar from age 16. He plays the piano by ear. Taylor has sung and played guitar in several of his own bands, including Honky Tonk Angels, Cardboard Box Man, Flipper & Humphrey, Access Axis, and The Thirteens, a country-western rock band described by Taylor as, "three manic depressives playing sad angst and western music for sad people." He names Johnny Cash and Lou Reed as two of the artists he admires.

On 14 November 2012, Taylor married Dionne Harris, an Australian fashion designer. They have a daughter and live in Brighton, East Sussex.

== Filmography ==
=== Film ===
Year	Title	Role	Notes
1986	Dogs in Space	Bowie Fan	
1987	The Year My Voice Broke	Danny Embling	
1989	The Prisoner of St. Petersburg	Jack	
1989	Lover Boy	Mick	Short film
1991	Flirting	Danny Embling	
1991	Dead to the World	Skip	
1992	Secrets	Randolf	
1993	The Nostradamus Kid	Ken Elkin	
1995	Dad and Dave: On Our Selection	Joe Rudd	
1996	Shine	David Helfgott – Adolescent	
1997	True Love and Chaos	Dean	
1998	Woundings	Journalist	
1998	There's No Fish Food in Heaven	Jeff	
1999	Simon Magus	Simon Magus	
1999	The Escort	Gem	
2000	The Nine Lives of Tomas Katz	Hyde Park Nutter	
2000	Almost Famous	Dick Roswell	
2001	Lara Croft: Tomb Raider	Bryce	
2001	He Died with a Felafel in His Hand	Daniel Kirkhope	
2001	Vanilla Sky	Edmund Ventura	
2002	Max	Adolf Hitler	
2003	The Sleeping Dictionary	Neville Shiperly	
2003	Lara Croft: Tomb Raider – The Cradle of Life	Bryce	
2004	The Life Aquatic with Steve Zissou	Vladimir Wolodarsky	
2005	Charlie and the Chocolate Factory	Mr. Bucket	
2005	The Proposition	Brian O'Leary	
2005	The New World	Selway	
2008	Lecture 21	Peters	
2009	The New Daughter	Professor Evan White	
2010	Red White & Blue	Nate	
2010	Submarine	Lloyd Tate	
2011	Red Dog	Jack Collins	
2012	Lawless	Gummy Walsh	
2013	The Double	Harris	
2013	Mindscape	Peter Lundgren	
2014	Predestination	Mr. Robertson	
2014	Edge of Tomorrow	Dr. Carter	
2014	Lost in Karastan	Xan Butler	
2014	Maya the Bee Movie	Crawley (voice)	
2016	The Windmill Massacre	Nicholas Cooper	
2016	Free Fire	Gordon	
2016	The Menkoff Method	Max Menkoff	
2017	Paddington 2	Phibs	
2018	Skyscraper	Mr. Pierce	
2025	Bulk	Sessler	
2026	Big Girls Don't Cry	Leo	
TBA	A Colt Is My Passport		Post-production
TBA	Trash TV		Post-production

=== Television ===
Year	Title	Role	Notes
1987	Frontier	Convict George Anderson	Miniseries, 3 episodes
1988	Dadah Is Death	Andrew Barlow	Television film
1989	Dolphin Cove	Convict	Episode: "Stormy Weather"
1989	Bangkok Hilton	Billy Engels	Miniseries, 3 episodes
1990	A Country Practice	Tony Waterson	2 episodes
1991	Boys from the Bush	Vince	Episode: "Multi Culture"
1991	Inspector Morse	Dave Harding	Episode: "Promised Land"
1991	The Last Crop	Craig Sweeney	Television film
1993	G.P.	Dr. Martin Lloyd	Episode: "Infected"
1993	Joh's Jury	Brad	Television film
1997	Water Rats	Ronny Jefferson	Episode: "The Witness"
2010	Rake	Stanley Shrimpton	Episode: "R vs Lorton"
2012	The Borgias	Mortician	2 episodes
2012	Hatfields & McCoys	Lark Varney	Miniseries, 2 episodes
2013–2014	Game of Thrones	Locke	8 episodes
2014	Peaky Blinders	Darby Sabini	6 episodes
2015	Powers	Johnny Royalle	10 episodes
2015	And Then There Were None	Thomas Rogers	Miniseries, 2 episodes
2016	Deep Water	Nick Manning	Miniseries, 4 episodes
2017–2019	Preacher	Adolf Hitler	Main role (seasons 2–4)
2019	Hanna	Dr. Roland Kunek	3 episodes
2023	Foundation	Hetman	3 episodes
2023	A Small Light	Fritz Pfeffer	Miniseries, 6 episodes
2024	So Long, Marianne	George Johnston	Supporting role
2024	Thou Shalt Not Steal	Robert Senior	Supporting role
2027	Wednesday	Cyrus	

=== Music video appearances ===
Year	Title	Artist	Role
1989	Romeos	Alphaville	Romeo
1997	M.O.R.	Blur	Truck Passenger
2001	Fifteen Feet of Pure White Snow	Nick Cave and the Bad Seeds	Dancer

== Music ==
Year	Title	Artist	Type
2001	Popular Music for All Peoples	'C.B.M.' (Cardboard Box Man)	Album
2011	Live Free or Die!!!	Noah Taylor & the Sloppy Boys	EP on Z-Man Records

== Awards and nominations ==
Year	Award	Category	Nominated work	Result
1987	Australian Film Institute Awards	Best Actor in a Leading Role	The Year My Voice Broke	Nominated
1988	Film Critics Circle of Australia Awards	Best Actor	The Year My Voice Broke	Won
1995	Australian Film Institute Awards	Best Actor in a Supporting Role	Dad and Dave: On Our Selection	Nominated
1996	Australian Film Institute Awards	Best Actor in a Leading Role	Shine	Nominated
1997	Film Critics Circle of Australia Awards	Best Supporting Actor	Shine	Won
1997	Screen Actors Guild Awards	Outstanding Performance by a Cast in a Motion Picture	Shine	Nominated
1997	Screen Actors Guild Awards	Outstanding Performance by a Male Actor in a Supporting Role	Shine	Nominated
1997	Chlotrudis Awards	Best Actor	Shine	Nominated
2001	Online Film Critics Society Awards	Best Ensemble	Almost Famous	Won
2001	Screen Actors Guild Awards	Outstanding Performance by a Cast in a Motion Picture	Almost Famous	Nominated
2004	Boston Society of Film Critics Awards	Best Ensemble Cast	The Life Aquatic with Steve Zissou	Nominated
2005	Critics' Choice Movie Awards	Best Acting Ensemble	The Life Aquatic with Steve Zissou	Nominated
2012	Fantasia International Film Festival Awards	Best Actor	Red White & Blue	Won
2012	Fangoria Chainsaw Awards	Best Actor	Red White & Blue	Nominated
2017	Logie Awards	Most Outstanding Actor	Deep Water	Nominated
2025	Australian Academy of Cinema and Television Arts Awards	Best Actor in a Drama	Thou Shalt Not Steal	Nominated
