= Flirting (film) =

1991 Australian film

- Theatrical release poster
- Directed by: John Duigan
- Written by: John Duigan
- Produced by: Terry Hayes; George Miller; Doug Mitchell; Barbara Gibbs
- Starring: Noah Taylor; Thandiwe Newton; Nicole Kidman
- Cinematography: Geoff Burton
- Edited by: Robert Gibson
- Music by: James D'Arcy
- Production company: Kennedy Miller
- Distributed by: Warner Bros. (through Roadshow Distributors)
- Release date: 21 March 1991
- Running time: 99 minutes
- Country: Australia
- Language: English
- Box office: $4 million

Flirting is a 1991 Australian coming-of-age drama film written and directed by John Duigan. The story revolves around a romance between two teenagers, and it stars Noah Taylor, who appears again as Danny Embling, the protagonist of Duigan's 1987 film The Year My Voice Broke. It also stars Thandiwe Newton and Nicole Kidman.

Flirting is the second in an incomplete trilogy of autobiographical films by Duigan. It was produced by Terry Hayes, Doug Mitchell, Barbara Gibbs, and George Miller, and made by Kennedy Miller Studios, which also made the Mad Max Trilogy. The film won the 1990 Australian Film Institute Award for Best Film, as The Year My Voice Broke had in 1987.

== Plot ==
Danny, an awkward, underdeveloped 17-year-old, has been sent away by his parents to the all-male St. Albans boarding school in rural New South Wales, Australia, in the hopes he won’t become a delinquent. The year is 1965 and it has been some time since Danny has had a romantic relationship with a girl. Danny is the butt of jokes because of his stutter and long nose (for which he is nicknamed "Bird"). His only friend is Gilbert.

At a school rugby game, he meets and slowly becomes interested in Thandiwe, the daughter of a Ugandan father and Kenyan-British mother, who attends the all-girls Cirencester Ladies’ College across the lake, while her father, a political activist, is lecturing at university in Canberra. They later meet at a debate between the two schools, and covertly during a school dance. She is punished for leaving the dance without permission and is given chores by the prefect, Nicola. Thandiwe is later befriended by Melissa and Janet.

Throughout the course of the school year, they foster a budding romance, despite the overbearing regulations inflicted upon them — specifically racial politics and social conventions (Thandiwe is often regarded by the school authorities as rebellious and overtly sexual). After the musical performance, Danny introduces his parents to Thandiwe and her parents. They later decide to return to Uganda in response to the political turmoil there. Soon Thandiwe decides to return too, and lies about her true departure date, in order to spend the night in a motel with Danny. They are discovered, leading to his expulsion. Thandiwe writes to him regularly from Uganda, but then the letters stop coming. One day a letter arrives from Nairobi saying she is finally safe there.

== Cast ==
- Noah Taylor as Danny Embling
- Thandiwe Newton as Thandiwe Adjewa
- Nicole Kidman as Nicola Radcliffe
- Marshall Napier as Mr. Rupert Elliott
- Kym Wilson as Melissa
- Naomi Watts as Janet
- Les Hill as Greg Gilmore
- Judi Farr as Shella Embling
- Femi Taylor as Letitia Adjewa

== Production ==
The script was written before The Year My Voice Broke. Although the story evokes universal themes of romance and love, some say that it also examines the properties of the "Australian character": existential isolation and strong cultural ties to Great Britain. It was filmed on location in Sydney, Bathurst, and Braidwood, New South Wales, including scenes at St Stanislaus College in Bathurst.

Flirting features one of the last appearances by Nicole Kidman in an Australian-produced film before she made her transition to Hollywood (though she would return in later years to act in movies for director Baz Luhrmann); Kidman had previously worked with director Duigan on the Australian miniseries Vietnam. Actress Thandiwe Newton later said that starting at her audition, when she was 16, Duigan groomed and sexually abused her.

== Music ==
- "Proserpina" – written by John Duigan and Sarah de Jong
- "(By the) Sleepy Lagoon" – performed by Harry James
- "The Wasps" – composed by Ralph Vaughan Williams, performed by Queensland Symphony Orchestra
- "Johnny Get Angry" – performed by Joanie Sommers
- "Tutti Frutti" – written by Little Richard, Dorothy La Bostrie and Joe Lubin
- "I Just Wanna Make Love to You" – written by Willie Dixon
- "The Moochie" – performed by Sidney Bechet
- "With a Girl Like You" – performed by The Troggs
- "Little Egypt" – written by Jerry Leiber and Mike Stoller
- "Big Bad John" – written by Jimmy Dean

The song "With a Girl Like You" is actually out of the period, not being released until August 1966.

== Reception ==
Flirting grossed $1,655,044 at the box office in Australia and $2,415,396 in the US. and was widely critically acclaimed. It featured on Roger Ebert's Top 10 Best Films List of 1992. Later it was ranked number 46 on Entertainment Weekly's list of the 50 Best High School Movies. Vincent Canby of The New York Times commented:

There is a kind of painless calm about "Flirting." The film is simultaneously attractive and just a little dull. Mr. Duigan avoids melodrama, which is all to the good. Yet his gift for the acutely observed commonplace detail is neither strong nor original enough to transform the movie into something comparable to so many similar, better films. The best things about "Flirting" are the performances. Ms. Newton is delightful as Thandiwe, who is far more sophisticated than Danny and wise enough never to let him know it. Mr. Taylor is also good, although the troubled Danny is not an easy character to play. He's virtually the generic artist as a young man. Nicole Kidman appears in a supporting role as one of Thandiwe's older classmates, who is less of a snob than she first appears.

In his review for The Washington Post, Desson Thomson commented:

The movie is full of wonderful scenes: Newton caught hiding in a boys' toilet stall as the unsuspecting lads come in to shower, a line of uniformed boys ritualistically facing a row of ballroom-gowned girls at a school dance, and so on. "Flirting" is also full of amusing rejoinders and comments: "Remember her needs as well as yours," suggests Taylor's friend with secondhand Kamasutra wisdom when Taylor heads toward an intended sensual tryst. "If you can give her pleasure, she'll be back for more."

On the review aggregator website Rotten Tomatoes, 96% of 25 critics' reviews are positive. The website's consensus reads: "A terrific follow-up to The Year My Voice Broke, Flirting is a teen movie worth watching, thanks to emotionally engaging performances and an endearing script."

== Awards ==
The film received the following 1990 AFI Awards:

- Best Film (Terry Hayes, Doug Mitchell, George Miller)
- Best Achievement in Editing (Robert Gibson)
- Best Achievement in Production Design (Roger Ford)

It was also nominated for:

- Best Achievement in Sound (Antony Gray, Ross Linton, Phil Judd)
- Best Actor in Supporting Role (Bartholomew Rose)
- Best Achievement in Cinematography (Geoff Burton)

As part of a years-long project to document his life, editor Robert Gibson took a rolling hand-held camera on stage as he accepted his Best Achievement in Editing Award for Flirting at the AFIs. The resulting footage is included in his later film Video Fool for Love, which focuses mostly on his intimate personal life.

== See also ==
- Cinema of Australia
