= Video Fool for Love =

- Directed by: Robert Gibson
- Produced by: George Miller; Doug Mitchell
- Starring: Robert Gibson; April Ward; Gianna Santone; Cindy Carpenter
- Music by: Antony Partos
- Production company: Kennedy Miller
- Release dates: 1995 (Sydney Film Festival); 1996 (Australia)
- Running time: 87 minutes
- Country: Australia
- Language: English

Video Fool for Love is a 1995 Australian autobiographical documentary film directed by film editor Robert Gibson and produced by George Miller. The film is compiled from 600 hours of camcorder footage shot by Gibson from 1983 to 1993. It focuses on Gibson's personal life from 1988 to 1991, particularly his tumultuous relationships with April Ward, Gianna Santone and Cindy Carpenter.

== Synopsis ==
The film opens with an interview with George Miller about the viability of the film. Gibson's parents are also interviewed about how he dealt with a recent breakup with a woman named Gianna Santone, and he is seen running distraught on a beach in the breakup's aftermath chanting "Gianna Maria Gabriela Santone, why do you leave me and make me so lonely?"

In a flashback, Gibson wins an AFI Award for his editing work on Flirting and walks on stage carrying a camera. At this time in his life, he is dating a woman named April Ward. She moves to London, and he promises to follow. In an interview, Gibson is asked by Ward what he considers "sexy" on a woman. He replies "Bottoms. Bottoms and tummies."

Gibson then meets Santone at a hotel bar where she works as a bartender. They begin dating and a series of flirtatious exchanges are depicted. In one long sequence, a naked Gibson searches for a condom in his bedroom so that they can have sex, before finding a box of LifeStyles.

As Gibson plans to fly to London on pre-booked tickets to reunite with Ward, Santone says she does not want to see Gibson anymore. A conflicted Gibson muses to camera about what to do. Before leaving for London, he stops in at Santone's house. As he drives away, he notes that he "forgot" to say he loved her. In a phone interview, his father calls the situation "the height of idiocy."

In London, Gibson and Ward throw several house parties and he proposes marriage to her. They then go on a ski trip, where they have several argumentative exchanges and Ward is upset to learn about Santone. Ward and her friends leave for Paris. Meanwhile, the Gulf War begins. Gibson then returns to Australia, where he moves into a house in Newcastle with Santone and her cat Lewis, who Gibson rescues from being stuck on their house's tin roof. A series of sexually charged moments follow, including one sequence on a beach.

Ward writes a series of angry letters and makes emotional phone calls to Gibson, upsetting Santone. As the Gulf War unfolds on TV, Gibson compares Ward to a Scud missile: "She came out of the heavens from nowhere, she was not very accurate, but she was, morale-wise, psychologically devastating."

While Santone works as a radio newsreader at the ABC, Gibson maintains a full-time career in film editing. Gibson suggests they become a "multimedia couple." He proposes marriage to Santone, which she accepts. Santone takes Gibson to her family home and introduces him to her parents. At a later party, a friend of Gibson talks about earlier sexual experiences involving Gibson, including a foursome. Santone watches, looking uncomfortable.

Gibson buys Santone a $4,000 engagement ring, but then a woman he identifies only as "Katarina the Black Queen" convinces her not to marry him. Santone tells Gibson she's sick of "receiving obnoxious letters from your 'Scud missile' friend." Gibson is able to talk her back around, and plans for the wedding continue. They visit the Queen Victoria Building as a potential venue and fill out paperwork at the Births Deaths and Marriages NSW office.

Santone is upset that Gibson has not taken down photos of Ward from his apartment, and upends a box of her possessions that Gibson has been packing up. "I hate myself", Gibson muses to camera, "but I like myself at the same time." Gibson also wants to plan a trip to Nepal, but Santone is not interested. He tells her they will meet under the Eiffel Tower in Paris, but she is skeptical. Gibson then attends a sperm bank to freeze his sperm, and masturbates on camera to obtain the sample.

As life goes on, Santone grows increasingly irritated with the presence of Gibson's camera. He insists he wants their relationship to become a "media event" and that the resulting film will win festivals. She tells him that the project has no structure, just as Gibson has problems structuring his thoughts. An unnamed filmmaker comes to dinner and calls Gibson's footage "ugly pornography." Gibson and Santone then go out for yum cha, and he attempts to reconstruct her reaction after failing to capture it on film. In another argument, she says she wants to go to Paris just for its own sake and not to make a film.

Santone begins seeing another man. When she tells Gibson, he reacts aggressively. In a diary entry to camera, Gibson discusses physically grabbing and confronting her on the streets of Kings Cross as she attempted to run away and withdraw money from an ATM. This is not fully depicted, but in one shot, she is seen running away from behind. She later returns to his apartment to gather her possessions, but he locks the door and refuses to let her leave until she agrees to return the engagement ring, calling her "goods and chattels." Eventually, he is persuaded to let her out by a friend of Santone's outside the apartment.

In a montage, Gibson begins to reflect on his memories with Santone and process the breakup. As Roy Orbison's "Crying" plays on his stereo, Gibson breaks down in tears.

Two years later, Gibson has met another woman, Cindy Carpenter. Together, they travel to Nepal, Machu Picchu, the Amazon rainforest and Tierra del Fuego. In the final shot, Gibson uses a remote to direct a camera as it films them kissing on a park bench from a distance, and Gibson remarks that they are about to leave for Paris.

== Production ==
Gibson edited various Australian films and TV productions since the 1970s, including The Dirtwater Dynasty, Flirting and Daydream Believer. In 1983, he began keeping a "video diary" with a camcorder. "I was always shoving the camera into people's faces at parties, family occasions, at work, everywhere I went", he later told The Toronto Star. "At first, people thought I was a dork. But eventually I found if you had a video camera with you in your life, people would be unusually frank and open, without the stigma of having a crew and lights, which tends to make people act out."

Gibson met George Miller while sitting in on the editing process for Mad Max and pitched various ideas to him over the years, including a screenplay entitled Carpark Freaks. Miller became interested once Gibson mentioned that he had exhaustively documented his relationship with Gianna Santone on video, including the moment they first met, various arguments and moments of intense passion. Viewing the footage, Miller was impressed at the lengths Gibson had gone to. Feeling that Gibson's vulnerability "made Woody Allen look like a dinosaur", Miller agreed to produce a feature film compiled from this footage through his Kennedy Miller production house.

Santone signed a release allowing her name and image to be used in the film, and rewatched all of the footage with Gibson to help catalogue it. This process, which Gibson described as "a psychological challenge", took six weeks. Despite the real-life nature of the film, Gibson insisted it was not a documentary and withdrew it from the AFI Awards when they refused to classify it otherwise. He considered it a drama, "an almost farcical love story... trying to find the drama or comedy of a situation."

== Release ==
The film screened at the Sydney Film Festival in 1995. In 1996, it ran theatrically in Australian arthouse cinemas and was released on VHS. It also opened the Hot Docs Canadian International Documentary Festival in 1999. The film has never been reissued on DVD or on streaming platforms.

== Reception ==
Video Fool for Love was a controversial film that met a divisive reception.

Sandra Brennan of The New York Times called the film "narcissistic and sometimes painfully analytical." Adrian Martin described the film in The Age as a "witless farrago" that is "simply hideous... simultaneously banal and spectacular, not to mention excruciatingly painful to watch." He was also shocked by the fact the Video Fool for Love press kit identified Gibson as "the first (filmmaker) to put himself between the camera and his subject" as he felt similar concepts had been done many times before to greater effect, giving examples such as Corinne Cantrill's In This Life's Body and Ross McElwee's Sherman's March.

The Sydney Morning Herald called the film "Muriel's Wedding for men... 87 minutes of riveting cinema verité", adding that it "revealed much that is embarrassing and true about the way men and women fantasise about true love." Margaret Allen in the Green Left Weekly called the film "an intimate and sometimes sexually explicit home movie", adding that "the most unsettling aspect... is that every 10 minutes or so, there is the shock realisation that what you are witnessing actually happened. The fact that it is not acting makes it strangely intriguing and appealing."

In Canada, The Hamilton Spectator called the film "hilarious and irritatingly honest, an exploration of love gone wrong in the 90s that unabashedly documents the politics of romance." Antonia Zerbisias in The Toronto Star wondered whether or not Gibson and his subjects were "playing to the lens", but concluded: "It doesn't matter. Turn on Video Fool for Love and you won't be able to turn it off."

Jennie Punter, also of The Toronto Star, saw the film in the context of the global proliferation of CCTV. Elizabeth Lopez in The Age compared the film to infamous hand-held video footage from the Tiananmen Square protests and the assault of Rodney King, observing that "the grainy, hand-held look is in." In a review of Channel Nine's reality TV series Weddings, Sacha Molitorisz saw Video Fool for Love as part of a legacy of Australian "warts and all" documentaries including Sylvania Waters and RPA. Reflecting on the film's legacy in 1998, Lisa Mitchell of The Age also felt that it and Race Around the World "may have lulled (the Australian film industry) into a false sense of technical breeze and convinced too many that their view of the world deserves an audience."

== Prequel ==
In 2007, Gibson released a prequel entitled Death of a Chook that consists of footage shot in 1982.
