= Doug Mitchell (film producer) =

Film producer

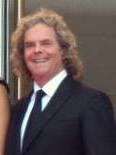
- Mitchell at the 2015 Cannes Film Festival.
- Years active: 1980s–present
- Awards: Golden Globe

Doug Mitchell is a film producer.

== Career ==
Mitchell's career as a producer began in the mid 1980s as a member of the Kennedy Miller production house based in Sydney. In the late 1980s he was nominated with George Miller and Terry Hayes on three occasions in the AACTA Award for Best Film category at the Australian Film Institute Awards. In 1987 they won best film for The Year My Voice Broke, were nominated in 1989 for Dead Calm and won a second award for Flirting in 1990.

In 1995 Mitchell was nominated for an Academy Award with George Miller and his brother Bill Miller in the Academy Award for Best Picture category for the film Babe. In total the film was nominated for seven Academy Awards, winning the Academy Award for Best Visual Effects. The trio won the 1995 Golden Globe Award for Best Motion Picture – Musical or Comedy and received nominations for the 1995 BAFTA Award for Best Film and the 1995 Producers Guild of America Award for Best Theatrical Motion Picture.

In 2006 he was a producer with George Miller and Bill Miller of the animated film Happy Feet. The film won the 2006 Academy Award for Best Animated Feature, the 2006 BAFTA Award for Best Animated Film and was nominated for the 2006 Golden Globe Award for Best Animated Feature Film. The trio were nominated in the Outstanding Producer of Animated Theatrical Motion Pictures category for Happy Feet at the Producers Guild of America Awards 2006. Following the release of Happy Feet Two in 2011 they were nominated for the 2012 Asia Pacific Screen Award for Best Animated Feature Film.

Mitchell received another Academy Award for Best Picture nomination with George Miller for Mad Max: Fury Road. The film was nominated for ten Academy Awards, winning in six categories. Mitchell, Miller, and P. J. Voeten (First Assistant Director) received further nominations for the 2015 Golden Globe Award for Best Motion Picture – Drama and the 2015 Producers Guild of America Award for Best Theatrical Motion Picture. The trio won the 2015 AACTA Award for Best Film.

== Filmography ==
=== Film ===
Producer

- The Year My Voice Broke (1987)
- Dead Calm (1989)
- Flirting (1991)
- Lorenzo's Oil (1992)
- Babe (1995)
- Video Fool for Love (1996)
- 40,000 Years of Dreaming (1997)
- Babe: Pig in the City (1998)
- Happy Feet (2006)
- Happy Feet Two (2011)
- Mad Max: Fury Road (2015)
- Three Thousand Years of Longing (2022)
- Furiosa: A Mad Max Saga (2024)

Co-producer

- Mad Max Beyond Thunderdome (1985)
- The Making of Mad Max Beyond Thunderdome (1985)

=== Television ===
TV movies

- The Riddle of the Stinson (1987)
- The Dirtwater Dynasty (1988)
- The Clean Machine (1988)
- Fragments of War: The Story of Damien Parer (1988)

Miniseries

- The Cowra Breakout (1984)
- Bodyline (1984) (Executive producer)
- Vietnam (1987)
- Bangkok Hilton (1989)

== Awards and nominations ==
- 1987: Won Australian Film Institute Award for The Year My Voice Broke, Best Film, with George Miller and Terry Hayes.
- 1989: Australian Film Institute Award nomination for Dead Calm, Best Film, with George Miller and Terry Hayes.
- 1990: Won Australian Film Institute Award for Flirting, Best Film, with George Miller and Terry Hayes.
- 1995: Won Golden Globe Award for Babe, Best Motion Picture – Musical or Comedy, with George Miller and Bill Miller.
- 1995: Academy Award nomination for Babe, Best Picture, with George Miller and Bill Miller.
- 1995: BAFTA Award nomination for Babe, Best Film, with George Miller, Bill Miller and Chris Noonan.
- 1995: Producers Guild of America Award nomination for Babe, Outstanding Producer of Theatrical Motion Pictures, with George Miller and Bill Miller.
- 2007: Producers Guild of America Award nomination for Happy Feet, Outstanding Producer of Animated Theatrical Motion Pictures, with George Miller and Bill Miller.
- 2012: Asia Pacific Screen Awards nomination for Happy Feet Two, Best Animated Feature Film, with George Miller, Bill Miller and Martin Wood.
- 2015: Won Australian Academy of Cinema and Television Arts Awards for Mad Max: Fury Road, Best Film, with P J Voeten and George Miller.
- 2015: Academy Award nomination for Mad Max: Fury Road, Best Picture, with George Miller.
- 2015: Producers Guild of America Award nomination for Mad Max: Fury Road, Outstanding Producer of Theatrical Motion Pictures, with George Miller.
- 2015: Golden Globe nomination for Mad Max: Fury Road, Best Motion Picture – Drama, with George Miller and P J Voeten.
