= Kennedy Miller Mitchell =

Australian production company

- Formerly: Kennedy Miller Productions (1978–2009)
- Founded: 1978; 48 years ago
- Founders: Byron Kennedy; George Miller
- Headquarters: Australia
- Key people: George Miller; Doug Mitchell; Bill Miller
- Products: Motion pictures, television, video games
- Services: Film production, television production, video game production

Kennedy Miller Mitchell Productions (known before 2009 as Kennedy Miller Productions ) is an Australian film, television and video game production company in Potts Point, Sydney, that has been producing television and film since 1978. It is responsible for some of Australia's best-known and most successful films, including the five Mad Max films, the two Babe films, and the two Happy Feet films.

Kennedy Miller Mitchell is one of Australia's oldest existing film production companies, and the most successful internationally. Its principals are George Miller and Doug Mitchell who has been a financial partner in the enterprise since 1981 and is George Miller's producing partner.

Many of the films are directed by the co-founder, George Miller, though he sometimes takes an organisational role and prefers to use someone else to direct, as with Babe, which was directed by Chris Noonan.

The company's most recent project was the fifth Mad Max film, titled Furiosa: A Mad Max Saga. A prequel and spin-off to the series, the film was released on 23 May 2024, to critical acclaim but was a financial disappointment.

== History ==
Byron Kennedy, who was a film school lecturer at the time, and George Miller first met at a summer film school in Australia in 1971. They began making short features and experimental work, including Violence in the Cinema, Part 1, which Byron produced, photographed and edited, and which won two Australian Film Institute (AFI) awards.

In 1978, Kennedy and Miller formed the production company Kennedy Miller Productions, which produced their first feature film, Mad Max. The success of the film allowed them to establish Hollywood contacts, and work in the United States as well as in Australia.

In July 1983, Byron Kennedy was killed when the helicopter he was piloting crashed. Miller's first reaction was to back away from filmmaking without Kennedy's input, but he decided to continue, and created a sizeable body of TV productions during the 1980s and 1990s, among them the six-part series The Dismissal (1983), the seven-part series Bodyline (1984), the six-part series The Cowra Breakout (1984), the ten-part series Vietnam (1987) with Nicole Kidman, the three-part series Bangkok Hilton (1989), and the five-part series The Dirtwater Dynasty (1989).

In 1994, the company took court action against Australian television broadcaster Nine Network over a contracted creative rights dispute. Kennedy Miller received a payout of $8.1 million.

In 1995, the company had a major success with the film Babe, the story of a pig who thinks it is a sheepdog. The film used cutting-edge animal animatronic and visual effects created by Jim Henson's Creature Shop, John Cox's Creature Workshop and Rhythm and Hues. Along with visual effects supervisor Scott E. Anderson, they were awarded the Academy Award for Best Visual Effects. Babe was the second largest grossing film at the Australian box office after Crocodile Dundee (1986).

In 1996, the company released Video Fool for Love, an autobiographical documentary shot by film editor Robert Gibson on camcorders over 10 years that focuses on his personal life and relationships.

In 2006, the company had another big success with Happy Feet, which topped the US box office.

In 2007, the company formed a partnership with Australian production and media services outfit the Omnilab Media Group, to launch a digital production company.

In 2009, the company was renamed Kennedy Miller Mitchell Productions.

In 2011, the company made a strategic move towards video game creation, and plans to make games for its own films. The company has taken on staff from two Australian game developers that have collapsed, Krome Studios and Team Bondi.

In early 2013, the company closed down their video game studio, KMM Interactive Entertainment, and ceased production on Whore of the Orient, which was going to be the next title from the devs behind the game L.A. Noire. After the studio closed down, the remaining devs formed an indie studio called Intuitive Game Studios, which would act as a successor to both Team Bondi and the KMM studio.

== Filmography ==
- Mad Max (1979)
- Mad Max 2 (1981)
- The Dismissal (1983) (miniseries)
- Bodyline (1984) (miniseries)
- The Cowra Breakout (1985) (miniseries)
- Mad Max Beyond Thunderdome (1985)
- Vietnam (1987) (miniseries)
- The Year My Voice Broke (1987)
- The Witches of Eastwick (1987)
- The Dirtwater Dynasty (1988) (miniseries)
- Sportz Crazy (1988) (documentary series)
- The Clean Machine (1988) (TV movie)
- The Riddle of the Stinson (1988) (TV movie)
- Fragments of War: The Story of Damien Parer (1988) (TV movie)
- Dead Calm (1989)
- Bangkok Hilton (1989) (miniseries)
- Flirting (1991)
- Lorenzo's Oil (1992)
- Babe (1995)
- Video Fool for Love (1996) (Documentary)
- 40,000 Years of Dreaming (1997) (Documentary)
- Babe: Pig in the City (1998)
- Happy Feet (2006)
- Happy Feet Two (2011)
- Mad Max: Fury Road (2015)
- Three Thousand Years of Longing (2022)
- Furiosa: A Mad Max Saga (2024)
- Mad Max: The Wasteland (TBA)
- Whore of the Orient (Cancelled)

Academy Award nominations

The Witches of Eastwick (1987)

- Best Original Score: John Williams – nominated
- Best Sound: Wayne Artman, Tom Beckert, Tom Dahl & Art Rochester – nominated

Lorenzo's Oil (1992)

- Best Actress: Susan Sarandon – nominated
- Best Original Screenplay: written by George Miller & Nick Enright – nominated

Babe (1995)

- Best Picture: George Miller, Doug Mitchell & Bill Miller, producers – nominated
- Best Director: Chris Noonan – nominated
- Best Adapted Screenplay: screenplay by George Miller & Chris Noonan – nominated
- Best Supporting Actor: James Cromwell – nominated
- Best Film Editing: Marcus D'Arcy & Jay Friedkin – nominated
- Best Art Direction: Roger Ford & Kerrie Brown – nominated
- Best Visual Effects: Scott E. Anderson, Charles Gibson, Neal Scanlan & John Cox – won

Babe: Pig in the City (1998)

- Best Original Song: "That'll Do," music and lyrics by Randy Newman – nominated

Happy Feet (2006)

- Best Animated Feature: George Miller – won

Mad Max: Fury Road (2015)

- Best Picture: Doug Mitchell & George Miller, producers – nominated
- Best Director: George Miller – nominated
- Best Cinematography: John Seale – nominated
- Best Film Editing: Margaret Sixel – won
- Best Costume Design: Jenny Beavan – won
- Best Makeup and Hairstyling: Lesley Vanderwalt, Elka Wardega & Damian Martin – won
- Best Production Design: Colin Gibson & Lisa Thompson – won
- Best Sound Editing: Mark Mangini & David White – won
- Best Sound Mixing: Chris Jenkins, Gregg Rudloff & Ben Osmo – won
- Best Visual Effects: Andrew Jackson, Tom Wood, Dan Oliver & Andy Williams – nominated

== See also ==
- List of film production companies
- List of television production companies
