= Team Bondi =

Australian video game developer

Team Bondi Pty. Limited
- Type: Private
- Industry: Video games
- Founded: 2003; 23 years ago
- Founder: Brendan McNamara
- Defunct: 5 October 2011; 14 years ago
- Fate: Liquidation
- Successors: KMM Interactive Entertainment; Intuitive Game Studios; Video Games Deluxe / Rockstar Australia
- Headquarters: Sydney, Australia
- Key people: Brendan McNamara; (creative director); Vicky Lord; (general manager)
- Products: L.A. Noire
- Number of employees: 35 (2011)

Team Bondi Pty. Limited (/ˈbɒndaɪ/ BON-dy) was an Australian video game developer based in Sydney. The company was founded by creative director Brendan McNamara, formerly of Team Soho, in 2003. The studio's first and only title, the action-adventure game L.A. Noire, was announced in July 2005. The development was originally funded and overseen by Sony Computer Entertainment Australia, although all publishing duties later switched hands to Rockstar Games. L.A. Noire was released by Rockstar Games, initially for PlayStation 3 and Xbox 360 in May 2011, to both commercial and critical success. Despite the positive reception, Team Bondi faced several allegations of poor working conditions by several former employees, causing controversy for the studio and leading Rockstar Games to part ways with Team Bondi following L.A. Noire's release. As a result of this, the developer saw itself unable to sign a publishing deal for a new game that was being written by McNamara.

In August 2011, the company's assets, as well as the intellectual property to a new game being written by McNamara at the time, were acquired by film production company Kennedy Miller Mitchell. Team Bondi was placed into administration on 31 August 2011, and finally entered liquidation on 5 October 2011. Many former Team Bondi staff members were transferred to Kennedy Miller Mitchell's KMM Interactive Entertainment subsidiary, and started developing the game around McNamara's script, which would eventually become Whore of the Orient. KMM Interactive Entertainment was shut down in April 2013, following Warner Bros. Interactive Entertainment's withdrawal from the Whore of the Orient project as its publisher; the game, despite receiving government funding after the studio's closure, was cancelled shortly after. A successor to both Team Bondi and KMM Interactive Entertainment, Intuitive Game Studios, was announced by two former L.A. Noire and Whore of the Orient developers in May 2013.

== History ==
=== Foundation (2003–2004) ===
Team Bondi was founded by Brendan McNamara in mid-2003. McNamara was previously employed at Sony Computer Entertainment Europe's Team Soho studio, located in London's Soho area, where he directed The Getaway (2002), but decided to move to his home country, Australia, to found his own studio. The opening of Team Bondi was announced in January 2004. At that point, McNamara had hired many former Team Soho staff, of which especially The Getaway developers, and had arranged an exclusive publishing deal with Sony Computer Entertainment Australia for a game on "third generation PlayStation" hardware.

=== Controversies (2011) ===
In early June 2011, former Team Bondi staff launched L.A. Noire Credits, a website dedicated to displaying over 130 credits of L.A. Noire developers that had been listed incorrectly or were left out completely in the game and its manual. Most of these were employees who left the studio or were laid off during the game's development. The same month, following initial statements made to the Sydney Morning Herald, Andrew McMillen published an article on IGN's Australian outfit, titled Why Did L.A. Noire Take Seven Years to Make?, in which he quoted eleven anonymous former Team Bondi personnel on the studio's managerial style, the staff's turnover rates and the working hours and conditions associated with the game's development. Additionally, McMillen interviewed McNamara, seeking his point of view on the statements made by the anonymous sources. As a result of the IGN Australia article, the International Game Developers Association (IGDA) announced that they were launching an investigation against Team Bondi and verify the claims made in the article. IGDA chairman Brian Robbins explained that "12-hour a day, lengthy crunch time, if true, are absolutely unacceptable and harmful to the individuals involved, the final product, and the industry as a whole".

In July 2011, an anonymous former Team Bondi employee leaked a series of confidential emails to GamesIndustry.biz, alongside their own comments in regards to them. Furthermore, the source stated that the relationship between Rockstar Games and Team Bondi had been badly damaged, and that they were confident that Rockstar Games would disdain from the publisher and refuse to publish any of their future games.

=== Closure (2011) ===
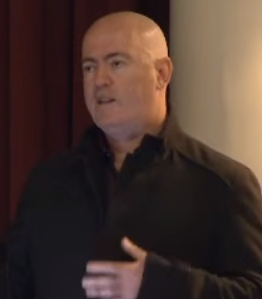
Brendan McNamara, Team Bondi's founder and creative director

In early August 2011, it was reported that Team Bondi was seeking a buyer, with McNamara being seen around the offices of Australian film studio Kennedy Miller Mitchell, believed to negotiate acquisition deals. On 9 August 2011, Kennedy Miller Mitchell announced that they had acquired all of Team Bondi's assets as well as the intellectual property to the game McNamara was presently writing the script for. All employees, 35 at the time, were given the opportunity to move to Kennedy Miller Mitchell for future employment. Team Bondi was placed into administration on 31 August 2011. At the request of Team Bondi's creditors, the company entered liquidation on 5 October 2011. The liquidator, deVries Tayeh, handled the sale of Team Bondi's remaining assets and payment of outstanding debts.

Team Bondi owed over 40 creditors as much as A$1,400,000, with unpaid wages or bonuses accounting for over 75% of those debts. 33 staff credited for their work on L.A. Noire were owed a combined A$1,074,283.28 in unpaid wages or bonuses. Among those, McNamara claimed to be owed US$102,495.16, general manager Vicky Lord A$99,155.21 and lead gameplay programmer David Heironymus A$43,652. Depth Analysis was also reported to be owed A$145,795.83.

=== Successors and Whore of the Orient (2011–2014) ===
Following Team Bondi's liquidation, Kennedy Miller Mitchell merged the staff previously acquired from Team Bondi into their KMM Interactive Entertainment subsidiary. KMM Interactive Entertainment, based in Sydney, was established by Cory Barlog to aid getting Kennedy Miller Mitchell into the video game industry. That subsidiary's first project was to be a tie-in game with the film studio's upcoming film Happy Feet Two. Many of the developers moved from Team Bondi immediately started working on the Happy Feet Two movie. McNamara's intellectual property that was acquired by Kennedy Miller Mitchell, which he previously described as "one of the great untold stories of the twentieth century", was announced to be Whore of the Orient on 28 November 2011. Developed at KMM Interactive Entertainment, McNamara was again appointed as creative director for the game. Kennedy Miller Mitchell executive George Miller stated that he was passionate about the project because it was "four-dimensional storytelling" and that "a game can literally become the equivalent of a novel. [...] It's a movie that's played interactively at home." The studio planned to go ahead with developing two new games with the support of government funding.

Whore of the Orient was set to be a spiritual successor to L.A. Noire. The game was targeted to be released on Microsoft Windows, PlayStation 4 and Xbox One, and set to release in 2015. The title of the game referred to one of the synonyms, alongside "Paris of the East", given to Shanghai, where the game would have been set. Warner Bros. Interactive Entertainment was named to have signed a publishing deal for Whore of the Orient. Warner Bros. Interactive Entertainment pulled out of the publishing deal again in December 2012. As a result of this, and due to general investment issues, KMM Interactive Entertainment was shut down in April 2013, and all staff was let go. Although not made official, it was widely believed that Whore of the Orient was effectively cancelled with the studio closure. Regardless, the game received a A$200,000 investment from Australian government agency Screen NSW in June 2013. Some journalists noted that the move felt rather illogical, as the development had previously been rather slow, and now that the game's studio had closed, the investment would not be of use for the agency. Furthermore, Whore of the Orient attracted controversy in September 2013, when City of Monash councillor Jieh-Yung Lo stated that he was offended by the game's title, it being a "disgrace to Chinese culture", daring to report the game to the Human Rights Commission. Lo further underlined "It's the use of the word 'Orient', more even than the word 'whore', that is the issue. [...] The O-word is very similar to the N-word for African-American communities." Whore of the Orient was not heard of from that point on; when asked about the game's status in a June 2014 podcast hosted on Gamehugs, producer Derek Proud stated "I don't think so", implying that the game had been cancelled.

Meanwhile, on 28 May 2013, Whore of the Orient lead designer Alex Carlyle and storyboard artist Kelly Baigent announced that they had founded Intuitive Game Studios as a successor to both Team Bondi and KMM Interactive Entertainment. Carlyle explained that he wanted to stay in Australia to work in the domestic video game industry, unlike some of his colleagues, who moved abroad, such as to Canada, to further pursue such ventures. Furthermore, Carlyle's personal website implied that the two-man studio would be working on an original intellectual property named Canonical Five. Like Whore of the Orient, Canonical Five received funding from Screen NSW, amounting to A$30,451.

McNamara founded Sydney-based studio Video Games Deluxe in 2013, whose first release was L.A. Noire: The VR Case Files in 2017. In 2020, the studio announced they were working on a "AAA open-world VR game" for Rockstar Games. In October 2021, the project was revealed to be a VR version of Grand Theft Auto: San Andreas. Following the release of the Meta Quest 3 in October 2023, players questioned the status of the VR version and some suspected it may have been quietly cancelled. Meta said the port was "on hold indefinitely" in August 2024. Meanwhile, Video Games Deluxe developed the mobile versions of Grand Theft Auto: The Trilogy – The Definitive Edition in 2023, and took over post-release development for the other platforms from Grove Street Games in 2024. In March 2025, Video Games Deluxe was acquired by Rockstar Games, who rebranded the studio as Rockstar Australia.

== Games developed ==
Year	Title	Platform(s)	Publisher(s)
2011	L.A. Noire	Nintendo Switch, PlayStation 3, PlayStation 4, Windows, Xbox 360, Xbox One	Rockstar Games
