= Bangkok Hilton =

1989 Australian TV miniseries

- DVD cover
- Genre: Miniseries
- Screenplay by: Terry Hayes
- Story by: Ken Cameron; Terry Hayes; Tony Morphett
- Directed by: Ken Cameron
- Starring: Nicole Kidman; Denholm Elliott; Hugo Weaving; Joy Smithers
- Composer: Graeme Revell
- Country of origin: Australia
- Original language: English
- No. of episodes: 3

Production
- Producers: Terry Hayes; Doug Mitchell; George Miller
- Running time: 120 minutes

Original release
- Network: 10 TV Australia
- Release: 5 November – 7 November 1989

Bangkok Hilton is a three-part Australian mini-series made in 1989 by Kennedy Miller Productions and directed by Ken Cameron. The title of the mini-series is the nickname of a fictional Bangkok prison in which the main protagonist (Nicole Kidman) is imprisoned, a mordant reference to Hanoi Hilton, the nickname for a prison used by North Vietnam during the Vietnam War.

== Plot ==
=== Episode one ===
In 1960s Sydney, Hal Stanton (Denholm Elliott) falls in love with Katherine Faulkner (Judy Morris), who has led a sheltered life at an isolated cattle station in the Australian outback.

After a brief, passionate affair, Hal's dark secret is revealed. During WWII, while a prisoner of war of the Japanese in Bangkok, Hal turned in soldiers under his command who were planning an escape from prison. The Japanese executed the men. After the war, Hal was court-martialed. Hal betrayed the soldiers to protect the rest of his men from execution in reprisals, but this was considered irrelevant. He was disowned by his family and lived with shame ever since.

Katherine's family breaks up the relationship and Hal moves despondently away. Soon after, Katherine gives birth to their child, Katrina. A delicate, asthmatic girl, Kat, is raised alone at the estate and treated as a shameful product of the illicit affair.

Twenty years later, Katherine dies, and Kat (Nicole Kidman) inherits the family fortune, also learning from the family lawyer that her father is not dead, as she had been told all her life.

Having never ventured off the estate, Kat travels to London, where Hal's family lived, to track him down. She finds James Stanton (Lewis Fiander), the uncle she has never met, who considers Hal dead, due to his shameful behavior in WWII. Kat overcomes James's resistance.

While in England, Kat meets a handsome American, Arkie Ragan (Jerome Ehlers), who sweeps her off her feet and invites her to travel with him back to Australia, by way of Goa. As Kat prepares to leave, James confesses that the family lawyer in Bangkok may know where Hal is.

In Goa, Arkie secretly picks up a shipment of narcotics and hides it in a camera case, which he gives to Kat as a gift. Kat decides to go to Bangkok to hunt down the family lawyer. Arkie strenuously objects to traveling through Thailand, but Kat insists.

In Bangkok, the family lawyer, Richard Carlisle (Hugo Weaving), is unwilling to help. Reluctantly returning to Australia, Katrina is arrested at Bangkok airport when the drugs in her suitcase are discovered. Arkie disappears as Kat is detained by Thai authorities.

=== Episode two ===
Kat meets Carlisle in prison. He agrees to tell Hal where she is. Hal is reluctant to meet Kat, but Carlisle convinces Hal to visit her in prison under a false name, pretending to be Carlisle's legal assistant. Hal is impressed by Kat's strength.

Kat is charged with drug trafficking, which carries the death penalty. She is taken to squalid, overcrowded, Lum Jau Prison to await trial and placed in a cell with other foreigners, ironically nicknamed the "Bangkok Hilton."

Mandy Engels (Joy Smithers), another Australian imprisoned for drug trafficking, teaches Kat how to sneak to the men's side of the prison, to visit and care for Mandy's cognitively disabled brother Billy (Noah Taylor), who was arrested with Mandy.

Carlisle convinces Hal to actively participate in the case, working with Kat, but maintaining his false identity as a junior lawyer. However, Hal flatly refuses to visit Kat in Lum Jau. He reveals to Carlisle that it is the same prison in which he was held by the Japanese 40 years earlier, and he cannot bear to enter its walls.

Hal finds the courage to go to Lum Jau. Based on Kat's memories, Hal retraces her footsteps to London, where he is reunited with his estranged brother James.

=== Episode three ===
In London, every trace of Arkie turns into a dead end. Hal continues to Goa, where he chases Arkie to the airport and sees him across a crowd. However, without proof of any crime, Hal cannot convince the Indian police to do anything.

Mandy and Billy are sentenced to death and executed. Soon after, Kat is also found guilty of drug trafficking and sentenced to death. The despondent Hal suddenly realizes that the escape tunnel that his men dug in WWII may still exist, as it was covered over when the Japanese discovered it. Kat will only have to get to the men's side of the prison to access it.

Hal convinces Carlisle, whose entire life has been devoted to defending the law, to break the law in order to save the innocent Kat from execution. Kat reveals that she can sneak to the men's side. After a failed attempt, Kat tries again the night before she's to be moved to another prison for her execution. Kat sneaks to the men's side, finds the escape tunnel, and uses it to get into the sewers, where she meets up with Hal and Carlisle. At the airport, Hal reveals to Kat that he is her father, as she boards her plane to Australia.

Hal escapes Bangkok and meets up with Kat in Goa, where they watch as Arkie is arrested and then walk together on the beach as father and daughter.

== Production ==
The mini-series was inspired by the Barlow Chambers Case, which was also turned into a mini-series. Terry Hayes felt it would be the basis of a good mini-series if the story was changed so the person who went to prison was innocent. He was also inspired by the true story of an Irish woman who had fallen in love with an Arab who smuggled a bomb in her luggage.

Terry Hayes was originally meant to write the script but he was exhausted from Dead Calm (also starring Kidman) and Tony Morphett was given the job. However Morphett was too caught up in work on Sweet Talker (1989) and was unable to do it, so Hayes stepped back in.

The mini-series was specifically written as a vehicle for Nicole Kidman. It was shot over 13 weeks starting in March 1989.

== Filming locations ==
The production was shot in Australia, Thailand, India, and England.

The majority of the locations were shot in Sydney. A former convalescent hospital in Concord, Sydney served as the Faulkner family estate. Green-screen technology was used to superimpose this manor-style house into a rural New South Wales setting.

Other Sydney locations included Balmain High School, the former Mater Misericordiae hospital in Crows Nest and the Water Board (MWB) facility in Waterloo, as well as the Metro Cinema in Kings Cross.

Additional indoor scenes based in Thailand were largely set-based in the Kennedy Miller Studios Sydney, apart from scenes involving escape from the prison hospital in the final episode. This and earlier minor scenes (before the incarceration) were filmed in a disused section of the Mater Misericordiae Hospital in Crows Nest, New South Wales.

The non-set-based shots required careful acoustic management to ensure uniformity of sound and continuity of light.

Overseas locations included Bangkok International Airport, the Royal Orchid Sheraton Hotel in Bangkok, the Cidade de Goa Resort Hotel in Goa, Dabolim Airport in Goa, and London, England.

== Impact ==
It was the highest rating mini-series of the year (1989) and was the last of the series of productions Kennedy Miller made for Network Ten. It was also one of the last mini-series that attracted a large viewing audience, before the demise of the mini-series boom of the 1980s. The mini-series was a huge ratings success in Australia, earning a share of 42%.

Later productions with similar stories include Return to Paradise and Brokedown Palace. After the series aired, the name Bangkok Hilton has regularly been used in the media to refer to any and all Bangkok prisons as if those prisons were actually nicknamed Bangkok Hilton in real life. Some news reports state that the Lard Yao women's prison carries the nickname Bangkok Hilton A 2004 BBC documentary about Bangkwang prison - a male-only prison - was titled "The Real Bangkok Hilton". Some news reports have claimed that Bangkwang prison itself carries the real-life nickname "Bangkok Hilton".

== Versions ==
The miniseries was originally broadcast in Australia on 10 TV Australia as three episodes on 5, 6, and 7 November 1989, each running two hours with adverts, for a complete running time of four-and-a-half hours. This version was also broadcast in the US on TBS in October 1990 with a few minor edits of seconds at a time for content and language.

In 2000 it was released on DVD in the United Kingdom. Each episode was cut in half, creating six new episodes with three episodes on each of two discs. This version mistakenly left the subtitles off an important scene which is spoken in the Thai language.

The bootleg version, commonly available from Russia and other countries, cuts the series down to ninety minutes, only a third of its original length.

The DVD version released in Australia in 2005 presents the series in the original three parts but has been cropped for widescreen televisions, from 1.33:1 to 1.78:1, cutting off the top and bottom of the film. Because of this, the opening and closing credits had to be redone and the final shot of the film, which played under the closing credits of episode 3, has thus been omitted.

== Cast ==
- Nicole Kidman as Katrina "Kat" Stanton
- Denholm Elliott as Harold "Hal" Stanton
- Hugo Weaving as Richard Carlisle
- Joy Smithers as Mandy Engels
- Norman Kaye as George McNair
- Jerome Ehlers as Arkie Ragan
- Noah Taylor as Billy Engels
- Gerda Nicolson as Lady Faulkner
- Pauline Chan as Pretty Warden
- Lewis Fiander as James Stanton
- Ric Carter as Detective King
- Tan Chandraviroj as Major Sara
- Judy Morris as Catherine Faulkner
- Vincent Ball as British Attaché

== Bangkok Hilton hotels ==
At the time the miniseries was made, the Hilton International Bangkok at Nai Lert Park (opened in 1983), was in operation. The series carried a disclaimer that it had no connection to that hotel. The hotel is now called the Mövenpick BDMS Wellness Resort Bangkok.

== Remake ==
- The series was remade in Bollywood as Gumrah in which actress Sridevi plays the main role.
