= The Cowra Breakout (miniseries) =

- Written by: Margaret Kelly; Russell Braddon; Chris Noonan; Phillip Noyce; Sally Gibson
- Directed by: Phillip Noyce; Chris Noonan
- Starring: Alan David Lee; Junichi Ishida; Dennis Miller; Tracy Mann
- Country of origin: Australia
- Original languages: English; Japanese
- No. of episodes: 10 x 1 hour

Production
- Production company: Kennedy Miller

Original release
- Network: Network 10
- Release: 1984 – 1984

The Cowra Breakout is a 1984 Australian mini series based on the Cowra breakout, focusing on the friendship between an Australian soldier and Japanese prisoner.

== Plot ==
November 1942. A unit of inexperienced Australian soldiers arrives at the frontlines in New Guinea as Allied troops drive back the crumbling Japanese forces. One is private Stan Davidson, eager but naive. The newcomers soon receive some harsh lessons in the realities of warfare as they and their US allies encounter the savage and fanatical Japanese. Nervous young Lieutenant MacDonald leads Davidson's section on a patrol and they come across the remains of a Catholic mission, where two Japanese soldiers, the only survivors of their unit, are slowly starving to death in a concealed bunker, but able to surprise the Australians with machine-gun fire. MacDonald flees in terror, abandoning his men, most of whom are wiped out by booby-traps and machine-gun fire, leaving only Davidson and Mick Murphy alive, sheltering in a ditch. Davidson returns fire, killing one of the Japanese but the other, Junji Hayashi, pins the two Australians down with his machine-gun. Murphy is badly wounded and in agony and a distraught Davidson chooses to shoot his mate to end his suffering. Hayashi finally emerges from the bunker and makes a screaming Banzai charge, is shot by Davidson and falls wounded. The furious Davidson bayonets him, then topples the cross from the church roof — he is now a convinced atheist.

1944. Davidson is now back in Australia and, no longer fit for overseas service, is assigned to guard duties at the POW camp at Cowra, New South Wales. One of the senior officers there is Macdonald, who has been awarded a Military Medal on the basis of his report of the encounter at the mission, there being (as he thought) no surviving witnesses, so is discomfited by the reappearance of Davidson. The Japanese POWs are segregated to their own camp and are kept confined, unlike the amiable Italian POWs, who are allowed to work on nearby farms. Davidson is amazed to discover that Hayashi has survived his wounds and is now in the camp. From a basis of mutual respect, the two witnesses of MacDonald's cowardice become friends. Murphy's widow Sally lives near the camp and Davidson is romantically drawn to her, but cannot bring himself to tell her that it was he who ended her husband's life. Davidson's experiences has made him hate the war and he finds his attitudes towards the Japanese softening, causing a rift with the other guards, although he gets along well with Private Hook and Corporal Doyle, both former Anzacs from the First World War. Hayashi himself has no stomach for more fighting but a hard-line element amongst the POWs incites fanaticism, making many of the prisoners feel both ashamed at having been captured and determined to fight and die an honourable death. Davidson, closer than most at understanding the culture and the minds of the POWs, senses that something is brewing but his concerns are ignored by the officers, including MacDonald.

The Japanese POWs begin to plan a massed riot and break-out and most of the prisoners join in. Even Hayashi overcomes his reluctance and agrees to participate. Davidson, Hook and Doyle are all convinced that the POWs are planning something but their CO Major Dorden still refuses to believe it. Finally in the early hours of 5 August 1944, the Cowra breakout occurs as hundreds of POWs attempt a massed breakout, storming the gates and wire, brandishing makeshift weapons. Many of the prisoners are cut down as the guards open fire. Hook and Doyle, firing a heavy machine-gun, are over-run by a mob of Japanese and both are beaten to death but not before Hook manages to remove the firing bolt, preventing the prisoners from using the weapon. Hundreds of POWs escape into the surrounding bush.

The following day MacDonald is ordered to lead a unit of troops to re-capture the POWs. They encounter a fanatical group who refuse to surrender, kill MacDonald, then all hang themselves. Davidson, leading some raw recruits, encounters another group, but induces them to surrender quietly. Back in the camp, most of the surviving POWs (which includes those who were recaptured and those who chose not to participate in the breakout) are bitter and remorseful over what has happened. One of the ringleaders has, despite his rhetoric, stayed in the barracks, and is shamed into ritual suicide by his furious comrades. Those of the prisoners still on the loose are soon either re-captured or shot by trigger-happy soldiers and civilians. Hayashi is one of the last prisoners still at large when he reaches the farmhouse of Sally Murphy where Davidson is also present. Relieved to see his friend, Hayashi comes forward to give himself up but he is then shot dead by a group of soldiers nearby. Davidson sadly examines Hayashi's personal diary which ominously reveals that the latter's family reside in Hiroshima.

A written postscript at the start of the end credits pays tribute to the 231 Japanese and 4 Australians who lost their lives in the Cowra breakout.

== Cast ==
Main cast members

- Alan David Lee as Stan Davidson
- Dennis Miller as Mick Murphy
- Tracy Mann as Sally Murphy
- Andrew Lloyde as Lt. MacDonald
- Junichi Ishida as Junji Hayashi
- Kazuhiro Muroyama as Komatsu
- Munehisa Fujita as Minami

Supporting cast members

- Peter Hehir as Padre
- Carole Skinner as Mrs. Davidson
- Norman Kaye as Mr. Davidson
- Simon Chilvers as Major Horden
- Max Cullen as Private Hook
- Glenda Linscott as Heather
- Paul Smith as Bob Davidson
- Ernie Dingo as Murray
- Nique Needles as Stinky Smith
- Julie Nihill as Merle
- Peter Phelps as Terry Moyes
- Brian Moll as Doctor
- Rebecca Smart as Shirley Murphy

== Production ==
Filming was largely undertaken at Kennedy Miller's studios at King's Cross, Sydney, and at Singleton Army Barracks, and followed intense workshopping of cast and some of the crew. Six Japanese actors had central roles.

The series was sold in Britain and Japan.

== Reception ==
Reviews for the show were generally positive.

== Home media ==
The series has been edited into a continuous narrative, approximate running time 270 minutes in a two-DVD set, digitally remastered from film, in 16:9 format by Roadshow Entertainment.
