= 1940s in film =

Thousands of full-length films were produced during the decade of the 1940s. The actor Humphrey Bogart made his most renowned films in this decade. Frank Capra's It's a Wonderful Life and Orson Welles's Citizen Kane were released. Citizen Kane made use of matte paintings, miniatures and optical printing techniques. The film noir genre was at its height. Alfred Hitchcock made his American debut with the film Rebecca, and made many classics throughout the 1940s. The most successful film of the decade was Samuel Goldwyn's The Best Years of Our Lives, the film was directed by William Wyler, and starred Fredric March, Myrna Loy, Dana Andrews, Teresa Wright, Virginia Mayo, and Harold Russell. The film won nine Academy Awards.

== Technicolor ==
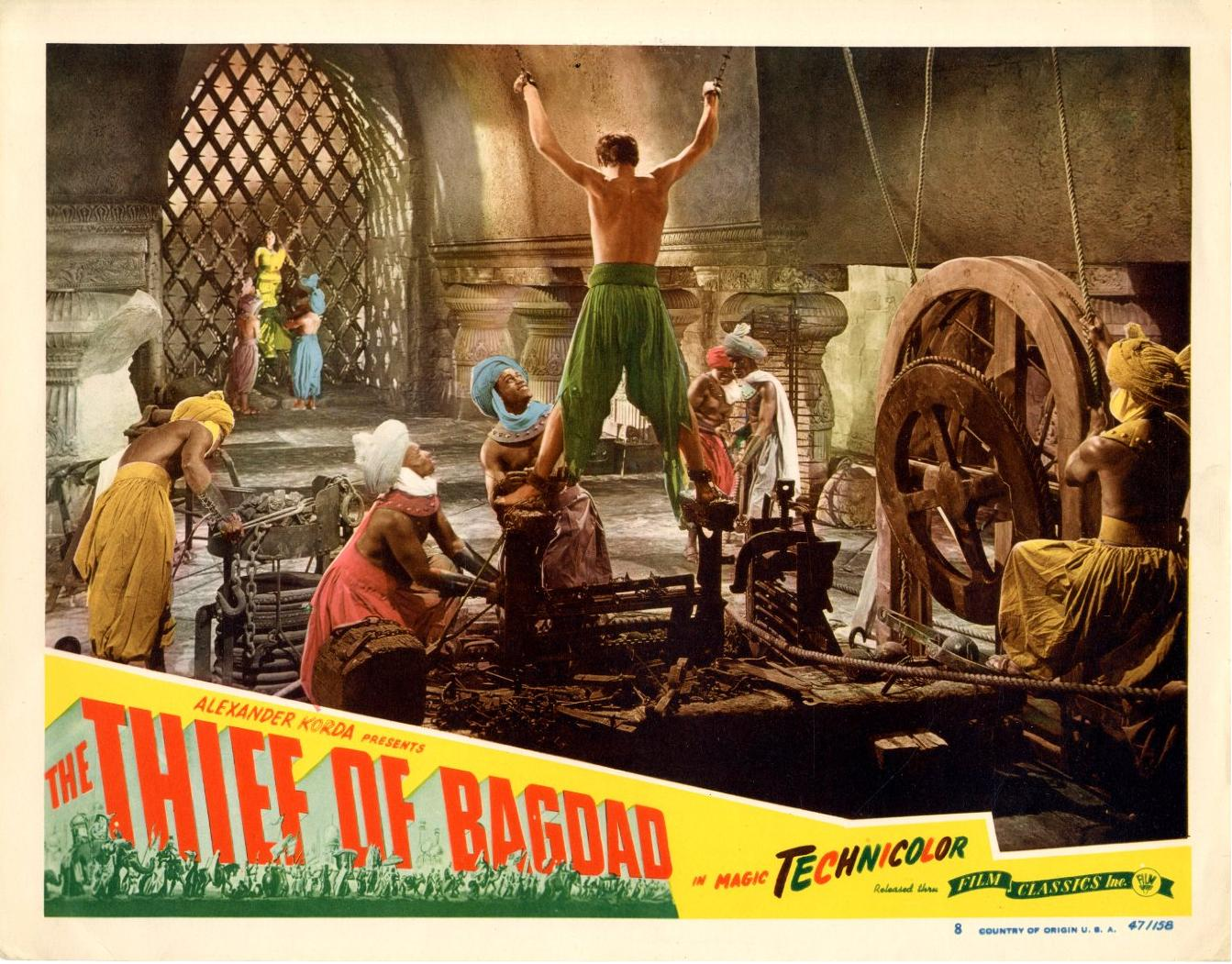
Lobby card for The Thief of Bagdad (1940), which used new matte painting techniques for use with Technicolor

By the 1940s, Hollywood's effects specialists had over a decade of studio experience. Technicolor had been especially challenging but faster film introduced in 1939 began to make Technicolor a viable option for studio production. Rear projection in color remained out of reach until Paramount introduced a new projection system in the 1940s. New matte techniques, modified for use with color, were for the first time used in the British film The Thief of Bagdad (1940). However, the high cost of color production in the 1940s meant most films were black and white.

== World War II ==
Hollywood films in the 1940s included morale films for those serving in World War II and their families. War films made extensive use of models and miniature photography. New techniques developed to realistically depict naval battles were used in films like Thirty Seconds Over Tokyo (1944) and Ships with Wings (1942). In Mrs. Miniver (1942) a technique using systems of wires was used to depict two dozen model aircraft taking off in precise formation. Miniature explosions were needed for the destruction of models.

The war also reshaped film industries beyond Hollywood. Argentina's neutrality prompted the United States to restrict raw film stock exports to the country while channeling investment, loans, and technical assistance to Mexico through the Office of the Coordinator of Inter-American Affairs. As a result, Argentine film production plummeted from 56 films in 1942 to only 36 in 1943, while Mexican production rose from 49 to 67 in the same period. By the end of the war, Mexico had firmly supplanted Argentina as the leading producer of Spanish-language films in Latin America. Argentina's Golden Age of Argentine cinema, which had dominated Spanish-language markets since 1939, entered a prolonged crisis; under President Juan Perón (1946–1955), protectionist measures—including screen quotas and state subsidies—managed to revitalize production levels, but financial fragility remained, and the industry never fully recovered its international position.

== Post-war slowdown ==
Cinemas were located in the city and the expansion of suburban housing in the post-War period meant declining revenues at the box office. The availability of television in homes was another factor that gave families in the suburbs an alternative to traveling to the theaters located in city centers. Between 1948 and 1952 average weekly attendance declined from 90 million to 51 million.

The Supreme Court in 1948 decided in United States v. Paramount Pictures, Inc. that owning both studios and theaters violated the Sherman Antitrust Act of 1890. After this decision film studios were forced to sell their theater chains.

== Lists of films ==
- 1940 in film
- 1941 in film
- 1942 in film
- 1943 in film
- 1944 in film
- 1945 in film
- 1946 in film
- 1947 in film
- 1948 in film
- 1949 in film

== See also ==
- Film
- History of film
- Lists of films
- 1940s in music
- Entertainment industry during World War II

== External lists ==
- List of 1940s films at IMDb
- List of 1940s deaths at IMDb
- List of 1940s births at IMDb
