= The Year My Voice Broke =

- Video release artwork
- Directed by: John Duigan
- Written by: John Duigan
- Produced by: Terry Hayes; George Miller; Doug Mitchell
- Starring: Noah Taylor; Loene Carmen; Ben Mendelsohn
- Cinematography: Geoff Burton
- Edited by: Neil Thumpston
- Production company: Kennedy Miller
- Distributed by: Hoyts Distribution
- Release date: 17 October 1987
- Running time: 103 minutes
- Country: Australia
- Language: English
- Budget: $850,000
- Box office: A$1,513,000 (Australia)

The Year My Voice Broke is a 1987 Australian coming of age drama film written and directed by John Duigan and starring Noah Taylor, Loene Carmen and Ben Mendelsohn. Set in 1962 in the rural Southern Tablelands of New South Wales, it was the first in a projected trilogy of films centred on the experiences of an awkward Australian boy, based on the childhood of writer/director John Duigan. The film itself is a series of interconnected segments narrated by Danny who recollects how he and his best friend Freya grew apart over the course of one year. Although the trilogy never came to fruition, it was followed by a 1991 sequel, Flirting. The film was the recipient of the 1987 Australian Film Institute Award for Best Film, a prize which Flirting also won in 1990.

== Plot ==
In 1962 in rural New South Wales, Australia, Danny is a thin, socially awkward 15-year-old boy who has been best friends with Freya since childhood. Freya was adopted as a baby; as a result, she is the subject of town gossip and rumours about her possible biological parents. The two spend their days at their childhood hangout on the outskirts of town, experimenting with telepathy and hypnosis.

Danny has grown feelings for Freya, but unfortunately for him, Freya becomes attracted to Trevor, a high school rugby league star, larrikin and petty criminal who helps Danny with the school bullies. Danny begrudgingly befriends Trevor, and the trio discover an abandoned house that is rumoured to be haunted. The three teens spend a night in the house, with Trevor and Freya sleeping together while Danny is off in a corner, faking being asleep. The next day, Trevor steals a car for a joyride. He is arrested and sent to juvenile detention; during his time away, Freya reveals to Danny that she is pregnant. Danny offers to marry her and claim the child is his, but Freya refuses, saying that she does not want to marry anyone. Meanwhile, intrigued by a locket left to Freya by an elderly friend of theirs who recently died—engraved "SEA"—Danny begins to investigate the town's past, and discovers a lone cross in the cemetery bearing those initials, belonging to a "Sara Elizabeth Amery," who died days after Freya was born. Through inquiries with his parents, Danny learns that Sara was well known for her sexual promiscuity years ago, and that she was Freya's biological mother, who died trying to give birth by herself at the abandoned house.

Meanwhile, Trevor breaks out of detention, steals another car, and severely wounds a store clerk during an armed robbery. Trevor returns to town long enough to reunite with Freya at the abandoned house, where he learns of her pregnancy. The police arrive at the house, but Danny aids in Trevor's escape. The police then run Trevor's car off the road during the course of the pursuit, and Trevor dies the next day. Freya disappears, and later suffers a miscarriage and hypothermia until Danny finds her at the abandoned house and takes her to the hospital. Hesitantly, Danny reveals the identity of Freya's mother to her. Realising the stigma now hanging over her, Freya decides to leave on the night train for the city. At the station, Danny gives her his life's savings to support herself and sees her off—promising their friendship to one another and to keep in touch. Later, Danny travels to their favourite hangout spot and carves the names of Freya, Trevor and his own into a rock, as his adult self informs the audience that he never saw Freya again.

== Cast ==
- Noah Taylor as Danny Embling
- Loene Carmen as Freya Olson
- Ben Mendelsohn as Trevor Leishman
- Graeme Blundell as Nils Olson
- Lynette Curran as Anne Olson
- Anja Coleby as Gail Olson
- Malcolm Robertson as Bruce Embling
- Judi Farr as Sheila Embling
- Bruce Spence as Jonah
- Rob Carlton as Pierdon
- Nick Tate as Sergeant Pierce
- Kevin Manser as Mr Keith
- Harold Hopkins as Tom Alcock
- Colleen Clifford as Gran Olson
- Kelly Dingwall as Barry
- Malcolm Kennard as School Kid

== Production ==
John Duigan wrote a script based on his experiences going to a boarding school in the mid-1960s. Unable to get the film funded, he wrote a prequel, The Year My Voice Broke, based on the leading character growing up in a country town. Duigan had worked with Kennedy Miller making the miniseries Vietnam and they agreed to make the film as one of four telemovies they were making for the Channel Ten network. Duigan was allowed to make the film on 35 mm. The film was shot, but not set, in Braidwood, New South Wales. It had several working titles, including Reflections of a Golden Childhood and Museum of Desire.

== Music ==
The main theme used in the film is "The Lark Ascending" by English composer Ralph Vaughan Williams. At a 2005 special-event screening in Sydney, director John Duigan stated that he chose the piece as he felt it complemented Danny's adolescent yearning. Additional source music featured in the film includes:

- "Apache", performed by The Shadows
- "Corinna Corinna", performed by Ray Peterson
- "Temptation", performed by The Everly Brothers
- "Tower of Strength" and "A Hundred Pounds of Clay", performed by Gene McDaniels
- "Diana", performed by Paul Anka
- "(The Man Who Shot) Liberty Valance", performed by Gene Pitney
- "Get a Little Dirt on Your Hands", performed by The Delltones
- "I Remember You", performed by Frank Ifield
- "That's the Way Boys Are", performed by Lesley Gore

All of the songs are true to the period, except "That's the Way Boys Are", which was released in 1964.

== Reception ==
=== Box office ===
The Year My Voice Broke grossed $1,513,000 at the box office in Australia, which is equivalent to $3,041,130 in 2009 dollars. The U.S. box office was $213,901. The movie was entered in the AFI Awards, despite protests that it was a telemovie. It was allowed in because Duigan argued it was shot in 35 mm and designed as a feature film. The movie won five AFI Awards, which led to Hoyts picking it up and releasing it theatrically.

=== Critical reception ===
Hal Hinson of The Washington Post reviewed the film positively, writing, "Set in 1962 in the ravishingly stark Southern Tablelands of New South Wales, 'The Year My Voice Broke'...sets you up for a dreamy coming-of-age saga, then delivers something tougher, moodier and more challenging." Hinson stated "Duigan's greatest strength is that he never condescends to his characters' emotions. He sees adolescence as a season of poetry in life, a time of excess when feelings run out of control."

Caryn James of The New York Times opined though the film covered territory familiar to coming-of-age stories, "it is so pleasant and unpretentious that we can almost forget the total lack of surprise in this deftly acted Australian film."

In a 2015 review for The Guardian, film critic Luke Buckmaster praised the film for managing to avoid stereotypes "despite being loaded with common archetypes and situations; there’s the bullied kid, the bad kid, the side plot about sexual awakening, the mid-year dance and the dramatic final event that sends shock waves through a conservative community." Buckmaster added, "It certainly didn’t hurt that the three, deeply memorable, central characters are played by a trio of fine actors in the formative stages of their careers."

In an article discussing the lack of female coming-of-stories in film, Suzie Gibson cited The Year My Voice Broke as a rare movie that gives equal weight to the boy and girl characters, writing "[Freya] is arguably one of Australian cinema’s most finely developed female characters, evoking the subtle shades of a burgeoning womanliness."

== Accolades ==
Award	Category	Name	Result	Ref.
AACTA Awards (1987 AFI Awards)	Best Film	Terry Hayes, Doug Mitchell, George Miller	Won	
AACTA Awards (1987 AFI Awards)	Best Direction	John Duigan	Won	
AACTA Awards (1987 AFI Awards)	Best Original Screenplay	John Duigan	Won	
AACTA Awards (1987 AFI Awards)	Best Actor in a Supporting Role	Ben Mendelsohn	Won	
AACTA Awards (1987 AFI Awards)	Members Prize		Won	
AACTA Awards (1987 AFI Awards)	Best Actor in a lead role	Noah Taylor	Nominated	
AACTA Awards (1987 AFI Awards)	Best Actress in a lead role	Loene Carmen	Nominated	
AACTA Awards (1987 AFI Awards)	Best Achievement in Editing	Neil Thumpston	Nominated	
AWGIE Awards	Feature Film	John Duigan	Won	
Film Critics Circle of Australia Awards	Best Actor - Male	Noah Taylor	Won	

== Home media ==
In America, the film was first released on VHS in 1988 by International Video Entertainment. A 21st-anniversary special-edition DVD was released in December 2008. Special features include an introduction by George Miller and a 50-minute retrospective, with Duigan interviewing Loene Carmen and Ben Mendelsohn in Australia and Noah Taylor in England.

The film was re-released digitally in 2015 by Lionsgate, the successor of International Video Entertainment.
