= Carole Skinner =

Australian actress

- Born: 8 May 1944 (age 82); Australia
- Occupation: Actress
- Years active: 1966–2009, 2015
- Known for: Prisoner; Sons and Daughters; The Harp in the South; Poor Man's Orange

Carole Skinner (born 8 May 1944) is an Australian retired actress, particularly known for her performances in theatre and television, although she has had small parts in films. She is perhaps best known internationally for her soap opera roles as Nola McKenzie in the soap opera, Prisoner, and Sons and Daughters, as Doris Hudson, as well as miniseries, The Harp in the South, and its sequel, Poor Man's Orange, as Delie Stock.

== Biography ==
=== Early career ===
Skinner began her acting career in 1966, and first rose to prominence as an established theatre performer. Her performance as Olive in a production of Summer of the Seventeenth Doll for the Melbourne Theatre Company in 1977 was met with high regard.

She became well known for her screen roles, particularly in television, making her debut in 1971, when she made a guest appearance in the Australian series, Dynasty, (not related to the American series of the same title) before going on to play a regular in Lane End (a spin-off series to the serial, Bellbird), and further guest roles in Certain Women, The Evil Touch, Ryan, Behind the Legend, and The Young Doctors.

== Television soap opera ==
=== Prisoner, Sons and Daughters and Neighbours ===
Skinner became best known locally and internationally for her six-month stint as Nola McKenzie in the Network 10 soap opera, Prisoner (known outside of Australia as Prisoner: Cell Block H), during its fifth season in 1983. She later admitted that it was her choice to leave the series after producers offered to extend her contract to continue playing Nola. The character was killed-off in one of the series most iconic scenes, when she was shot in the forehead with a zip gun. This was followed by guest roles in soap operas and drama series', including Sons and Daughters, as Doris Hudson, a house-keeper obsessed with her boss, in which she attempted to smother toddler Robert Palmer in the series' 1985 season cliffhanger episode, as Laura Dennison in Neighbours in 1986, and briefly appearances in The Flying Doctors and A Country Practice.

== Miniseries and later roles ==
She is also known for her role as Delie Stock in the miniseries, The Harp in the South, based on the novel by Ruth Park, and the sequel miniseries, Poor Man's Orange, also based on Park's second novel of the same name.

She continued to appear in high-profile drama series', including, two different roles in the Seven Network soap opera, Home and Away, as Mary O'Brien during the show's eighth season in 1995, and as Annie Matthews in the twelfth season in 1999, E Street, Minder (when episodes were filmed in Australia), Murder Call, All Saints, and McLeod's Daughters.

== Film appearances ==
Skinner is also a credited film actress, having appeared in several minor roles, including, her feature debut in the sex comedy, Alvin Purple, which spawned two sequels, and a short-lived television series. She continued with roles during the 1970s, in Eliza Frazer, co-starring with Susannah York and John Waters, and the critically acclaimed, My Brilliant Career, with Judy Davis and Sam Neill, before going on to appear in films, such as, Heatwave, Monkey Grip, Goodbye Paradise, The Umbrella Woman, Howling III, the second sequel to the classic 1981 film, and the 2001 blockbuster, Moulin Rouge! starring Nicole Kidman.

== Filmography ==
=== Film ===
Year	Title	Role	Notes	Ref(s)
1973	Maybe Tomorrow		TV movie	
1973	Alvin Purple	Mother Superior	Feature film	
1974	Parent Teacher Interviews	Parent	Short film (segment: "A Stranger")	
1976	Eliza Fraser	Mrs. Shortland	Feature film	
1979	My Brilliant Career	Mrs. McSwatt	Feature film	
1980	Going Home	Molly	TV movie	
1982	Deadline	Sybil	TV movie	
1982	Heatwave	Mary Ford	Feature film	
1982	Monkey Grip	Waitress	Feature film	
1982	The Mystery at Castle House	Aunt Josephine	Feature film	
1982	A Most Attractive Man	Frances	Short film	
1982	Goodbye Paradise	Landlady	Feature film	
1983	The Weekly's War	Nurse	TV movie	
1984	On the Loose	Mrs. Jones	Feature film	
1985	After Hours	Mother	Short film	
1987	The Umbrella Woman	Mrs. Gibson	Feature film	
1987	Howling III: The Marsupials	Yara	Feature film	
1991	Gotcha	Wilma	Short film	
1993	Don't Touch Wood!	Scott's Mum	Film (developed by ANZ Bank and Small Business Victoria)	
1994	Unacceptable Behaviour	Angela	Short film	
1995	Napoleon	The Cat (voice)	Feature film	
1996	Passion		Short play	
1996	Whipping Boy	Sex Store Wife	TV movie	
1998	Never Tell Me Never	Dusty	TV movie	
2001	Moulin Rouge!	Landlady	Feature film	
2002	Hetty	Hetty	Short film	
2008	The View from Greenhaven	Bonny	Feature film	

=== Television ===
Year	Title	Role	Notes
1971	Dynasty	Mavis Patterson	TV series, S2E13
1972	Lane End	Peggy Dunlop	TV series, 7 episodes
1973	Certain Women		TV series
1973; 1974	The Evil Touch	Hortense / Madge	TV series, S1E4 & S1E18
1974	Ryan	Jane Moore	TV series, S1E31
1975	Behind the Legend		TV series, S3E10
1979	Ray Lawler's The Doll Trilogy: Other Times; Kid Stakes; Summer of the Seventeenth Doll	Olive Leech	TV production (filmed 1977)
1980	Trial By Marriage		TV series
1980	Spring & Fall	Jamie's Mother	TV series, S1E6
1980	The Young Doctors	Dr Judith Ann Napier	TV series, episodes 846-878
1983	Prisoner	Nola McKenzie	TV series, S5, 40 episodes
1984	The Cowra Breakout	Mrs. Davidson	Miniseries
1985–1986	Sons and Daughters	Doris Hudson	TV series, S4–5, 14 episodes
1986	A Fortunate Life	Shalagh Phillips	Miniseries, 1 episode
1986	The Flying Doctors	Joan Morgan	TV series, S1E20
1986	Neighbours	Laura Dennison	TV series, S2, 19 episodes
1987	The Harp in the South	Delie Stock	Miniseries, 3 episodes
1987	Poor Man's Orange	Delie Stock	Miniseries, 2 episodes
1987	A Country Practice	Jean Brown	TV series, S7E59–60
1990	G.P.	Pat Kennedy	TV series, S2E36: "Crossover"
1992	E Street	Cathy Norman	TV series, 1 episode
1993	Minder	Mary Maguire	TV series, S9E13
1993	A Country Practice	Betty Birchgrove	TV series, S13E65–66
1995	Home and Away	Mary O'Brien	TV series, S8, 6 episodes
1998	Murder Call	Mickey Lane	TV series, S2E10–11: Deadline (parts 1 & 2)
1999	Home and Away	Annie Matthews	TV series, S12, 9 episodes
1999	All Saints	Sandra Gillespie	TV series, S2E40
2000	Bondi Banquet	Judy Trembath	TV series
2002	Don't Blame Me	Weird Wanda	TV series, S1E5 & 15
2003	White Collar Blue	Mrs. Simms	TV series, S1E6
2006	HeadLand	Supervisor	TV series, 3 episodes
2009	McLeod's Daughters	Helga	TV series, S8E14
2015	Catching Milat	Margaret Milat	Miniseries

=== Television (as self) ===
Year	Title	Role	Notes
1995	At Home	Guest	TV series, 1 episode
1996	Good Morning Australia	Guest	TV series, 1 episode

== Theatre ==
Year	Title	Role	Type
1966	Mother Courage and Her Children		New Theatre, Sydney
1968	Sam, The Highest Jumper of Them All, or the London Comedy		New Theatre, Sydney
1968	This Old Man Comes Rolling Home		UNSW with Old Tote Theatre Company
1968	America Hurrah		New Theatre, Sydney
1968	The Rimers of Eldritch		Ensemble Theatre, Sydney
1969	Triple Passion British Fashion		University of Sydney
1969	The Serpent		New Theatre, Sydney
1970	Let’s Get a Divorce	Concierge / Madame de Valfontaine / First Waitress	National Theatre, Launceston, Devonport Town Hall, Theatre Royal, Hobart
1971	The Recruiting Officer		Southern Highlands Festival Theatre, Mittagong
1971	A Streetcar Named Desire		Southern Highlands Festival Theatre, Mittagong
1971	Doctor Faustus		Southern Highlands Festival Theatre, Mittagong
1971	Duke of Edinburgh Assassinated or The Vindication of Henry Parkes		Nimrod Theatre Company, Sydney
1971	After Magritte		Nimrod Theatre Company, Sydney
1971	The Removalists		Nimrod Theatre Company, Sydney
1972	Listen Closely		Independent Theatre Sydney
1972	Housey		Nimrod Theatre Company, Sydney
1972	The Last Supper Show		Nimrod Theatre Company, Sydney
1972	Bigotry V.C.		Nimrod Theatre Company, Sydney
1973	Jumpers		Russell Street Theatre with MTC
1973	Long Day's Journey Into Night		Union Hall, Adelaide, St Martins Theatre, Melbourne with South Australian Theatre Company
1973; 1974	The Comedy of Errors		Arts Theatre, Adelaide, Arts Theatre, Adelaide with South Australian Theatre Company for Adelaide Festival
1974	The Bride of Gospel Place		Arts Theatre, Adelaide with South Australian Theatre Company for Adelaide Festival
1974; 1975	The Three Cuckolds		Playhouse, Adelaide with South Australian Theatre Company
1974; 1975; 1977	The Department	Myra	Playhouse, Adelaide, Russell Street Theatre, Melbourne, UNSW Old Tote Parade Theatre, Playhouse, Perth with National Theatre & South Australian Theatre Company
1975	Chez Nous		UNSW with Old Tote Theatre Company
1976; 1977	Going Home	Molly	St Martins Youth Arts Centre with MTC, Greenroom Theatre, Perth with National Theatre
1976	Old Flames		VCA with MTC
1976	Other Times	Olive Leech	Russell Street Theatre with MTC
1976; 1977	Kid Stakes	Olive Leech	Theatre Royal, Sydney, Russell Street Theatre with MTC
1977; 1978; 1979	Summer of the Seventeenth Doll	Olive	Russell Street Theatre, Melbourne with MTC, Playhouse, Adelaide
1977	The Doll Trilogy		Russell Street Theatre with MTC
1977	Absent Friends	Diana	Playhouse, Perth with National Theatre
1977	Yesterday's News	Journalist	Greenroom Theatre, Perth
1977	Otherwise Engaged	Beth	Playhouse, Perth with National Theatre
1977	Double Edge	Helen	Playhouse, Perth
1977	A Happy and Holy Occasion		Playhouse, Adelaide with South Australian Theatre Company
1978	Curse of the Starving Class	Ella	Nimrod Street Theatre, Sydney
1979	You Never Can Tell	Mrs Clandon	SGIO Theatre, Brisbane with Queensland Theatre
1979	The Golden Oldies	Robbie / Nora	Jane Street Theatre, Sydney with Australian Elizabethan Theatre Trust
1980	The Adventures of a Bear Called Paddington	Mrs Bird	Regent Theatre, Sydney
1981	Roses in Due Season	Lil Marriott / Sally	Nimrod Theatre Company, Sydney
1981	On Our Selection	Mother	SGIO Theatre, Brisbane with Queensland Theatre
1981	The Cocky of Bungaree	Diamond Lil	Clark Island, Sydney with Nimrod Theatre Company for Sydney Festival
1981	The Suicide		Nimrod Theatre Company, Sydney
1982	The Struggle of the Naga Tribe		Nimrod Theatre Company, Sydney
1983	Morning's at Seven		Marian Street Theatre, Sydney
1983	The Kid		Nimrod Theatre Company, Sydney
1984	The Golden Oldies		Seymour Centre, Sydney
1985	The Removalists		Phillip Street Theatre, Sydney
1987	Shepherd on the Rocks	Lily Thripp / Pink Lady / Sonia Slitzkin / Tilda Strutt	Playhouse, Adelaide with STCSA
1987	The Merry Wives of Windsor		Albert Park Amphitheatre, Brisbane with Queensland Theatre for Warana Festival
1987	Away	Gwen	Playhouse, Adelaide with STCSA
1987; 1988; 1989	A Month of Sundays		Marian Street Theatre, Sydney for Sydney Festival, Playhouse, Adelaide with STCSA, Cremorne Theatre Brisbane with Queensland Theatre & Northside Theatre Company
1988	Dinkum Assorted		Sydney Opera House, Playhouse, Melbourne with MTC & STC
1988	The 16th Australian National Playwrights' Conference		NIDA Parade Theatre
1989	Romeo and Juliet		Sydney Opera House with STC
1989	All My Sons		Wharf Theatre, Sydney with STC
1989; 1990	How the Other Half Loves		Glen Street Theatre, Sydney, Laycock Street Theatre, Gosford, University of Sydney, Twelfth Night Theatre, Brisbane, Gold Coast Arts Centre with Peter and Ellen Williams
1991	A Hard God		UNE
1991	Sailor Beware!		Marian Street Theatre, Sydney
1992; 1994	A Cheery Soul	Miss Docker	Suncorp Theatre, Brisbane with Queensland Theatre, Her Majesty's Theatre Adelaide for Adelaide Festival
1993; 1995; 1996	Barmaids		Lion Theatre, Adelaide with STCSA Bridge Theatre, Sydney with New England Theatre Company, Stables Theatre, Sydney with Griffin Theatre Company, Sorlies Restaurant, Sydney & Riverina Playhouse, Wagga Wagga with Theatre South
1994	Diving for Pearls		Newcastle Civic Theatre with Hunter Valley Theatre Company
1994	Waiting Rooms		Ensemble Theatre, Sydney
1994	Love Seen in Laundromat		Stables Theatre, Sydney with Griffin Theatre Company
1994	Barefoot		Stables Theatre, Sydney with Griffin Theatre Company
1995	The Floating World		Subiaco Theatre Centre, Perth, Playhouse, Adelaide, Glen Street Theatre, Sydney with STCSA & Black Swan Theatre Company
1996	Night on Bald Mountain		Playhouse, Adelaide with STCSA, Belvoir Street Theatre, Sydney
1998	Henry IV	Mistress Quickly / Bullcalf	Sydney Opera House, Canberra Theatre, Malthouse Theatre, Melbourne, Theatre Royal, Hobart, Monash University, His Majesty's Theatre, Perth with Bell Shakespeare
2000	The Marriage of Figaro		Sydney Opera House
2001	The Oldest Profession		Ensemble Theatre, Sydney
2001	King Ubu		Belvoir Street Theatre, Sydney
2003	Black Milk		Belvoir Street Theatre, Sydney with Splinter Theatre Company
2004	Our Lady of Sligo		Belvoir Street Theatre, Sydney
2006	Breathing Corpses		Darlinghurst Theatre, Sydney
2007	Parramatta Girls		Belvoir Street Theatre, Sydney
2007	The Estimator		Bille Brown Studio, Brisbane with Queensland Theatre
