= Toy Symphony (play) =

Play by Michael Gow

Toy Symphony is a two-act play written by Australian playwright Michael Gow and published by Currency Press in 2008. It is Gow's first full-length play in over a decade since Sweet Phoebe and won several awards at its 2007 premiere production at Belvoir St Theatre in Sydney.

Toy Symphony is the story of writer Roland Henning, a character who has appeared in Gow's earlier play Furious, Toy Symphony tells the story of the turmoil Henning faces as a result of his writer's block, as he tries to explain his past to his therapist in order to grasp some understanding of his current situation. It is considered to be at least partially autobiographical.

== Characters ==
- Roland Henning
- Nina (a therapist)
- Lawyer
- Mrs Walkham (a primary school teacher)
- Julie Pearson (a schoolgirl)
- Mr Delvin, Headmaster
- Alexander the Great
- Dr Maybloom, a specialist
- Executioner
- Nicolaijs Eglitis, a schoolboy
- Titus Oates
- Steven Gooding, a school bully
- Miss Beverly, a school teacher
- Nurse
- Daniel, a Drama student
- Tom, a drug dealer

== Plot summary ==
Roland Henning has writer's block. When he tries to explain the situation to a therapist, his story begins to tumble back and forth between his childhood in The Shire and his work as a playwright. At the root of it all is that extraordinary day in primary school which shattered his boyhood and plunged him headlong into the dizzy circus of life and art.

== Awards ==
- 2008 Helpmann Awards: Best New Australian Work
- 2007 Sydney Theatre Awards: “Best Main stage Production”
- 2007 Sydney Theatre Awards: “Best Supporting Actress” – Monica Maughan
- 2007 Sydney Theatre Awards: “Best New Work”
- 2007 Sydney Theatre Awards: “Best Director” – Neil Armfield
- 2007 Sydney Theatre Awards: “Best Actor” – Richard Roxburgh

== Original Production ==
Toy Symphony was first produced by Company B, a theatre company based at Belvoir St Theatre in Sydney. The production received rave reviews and won several awards including Best Director and Best Actor.

- Season 10 November 2007 – 22 December 2007 at Belvoir St Theatre, Sydney, Australia.
- Cast – Richard Roxburgh, Justine Clarke, Russell Dykstra, Guy Edmonds and Monica Maughan.
- Director – Neil Armfield
- Set - Ralph Myers
- Costumes - Tess Schofield
- Lighting - Damien Cooper
- Original music and sound - Paul Charlier.
- Production stage manager - Kylie Mascord.
