= Nicholas Eadie =

Australian actor (1958–2025)

- Born: 13 March 1958; Sydney, New South Wales, Australia
- Died: 22 January 2025 (aged 66); Sydney, New South Wales, Australia
- Education: NIDA (1978–1980)
- Occupation: Actor
- Years active: 1979–2015
- Known for: Cop Shop (1981–1982); The Henderson Kids (1985); Vietnam (1987); The Man from Snowy River II (1988)

Nicholas Eadie (13 March 1958 – 22 January 2025) was an Australian television, film and theatre actor.

== Early life and education ==
Born in Sydney, New South Wales to actor and Australian Broadcasting Commission radio announcer Mervyn Eadie, he attended Waverley College from 1968 to 1976, studied Arts at University of New England for one year in 1977, and studied at the National Institute of Dramatic Art from 1978 to 1980.

== Career ==
=== Film and television ===
Eadie's career began shortly after his graduation from NIDA, landing the role of Constable Sam Phillips on Cop Shop (1981–1982). He stayed on the series for two years. He then appeared in several films, including Undercover (1983), Kindred Spirits, Run, Chrissie, Run! (both 1984), and Jenny Kissed Me (1986). He gained further success in family drama series The Henderson Kids (1985) alongside Kylie Minogue and Ben Mendelsohn, playing the part of the protagonists' uncle, Mike Henderson.

He won the Australian Film Institute's Best Actor in Miniseries award in 1987 for Vietnam, in which he co-starred with Nicole Kidman and Barry Otto. In 1988, he played a rich would-be suitor in The Man from Snowy River II endeavouring to court Jessica Harrison (played by Sigrid Thornton). Eadie was nominated again for his 1988 portrayal of World War II Academy Award-winning cameraman Damien Parer in John Duigan's Fragments of War

Further notable television roles included a recurring role in medical drama Medivac (1996), as well as appearing in long-running series A Country Practice (1993). In 2002, Eadie was nominated for yet another AFI Award for Halifax f.p. (for one of two episodes he appeared in).

Eadie's final screen role was as Father John Brosnan in the 2011 TV film, Underbelly Files: The Man Who Got Away, the story of Australian drug smuggler David McMillan.

=== Theatre ===
Eadie worked with all the major Australian theatre companies with over 45 credits to his name. He appeared in leading roles in plays as diverse as Tennessee Williams' The Glass Menagerie as The Gentleman Caller in a highly acclaimed performance in 1985, Cat on a Hot Tin Roof as Brick (opposite Victoria Longley as Maggie and Bud Tingwell as Big Daddy) in 1991. He played John Proctor in three separate productions of The Crucible (Royal Queensland Theatre Company in 1991, STC in 1993, and STCSA in 2002).

In Sydney's Botanical Gardens, Eadie performed for three seasons as Oberon in Glenn Elston's production of A Midsummer Night's Dream. He played Sam in the original cast of Mamma Mia! in Australia for two years. He was in the world premiere productions of Michael Gow's Furious, Hannie Raison's Two Brothers, Tommy Murphy's Holding the Man and the highly acclaimed Myth, Propaganda and Disaster in Nazi Germany and Contemporary America by Stephen Sewell.

Further stage credits included Macbeth, Three Sisters, Summer of the Aliens, Two Weeks with the Queen, Furious, and Third World Blues.

Eadie's final acting role before his death was a 2015 stage production of Cock at the Old Fitzroy Theatre in Sydney.

== Personal life and death ==
In 2016, Eadie was robbed at knifepoint whilst on holiday in Barcelona, and was admitted to hospital for three days. In 2017, he was again in hospital for a major operation, resulting in a slow and difficult recovery, rendering him unable to return to acting on stage.

In his later years, Eadie worked as an Uber driver, which he claimed to love, enjoying the freedom of being 'his own boss' – while also stating he did not miss acting.

Eadie died in Sydney on 22 January 2025, aged 66. His death was announced by fellow actor Will Conyers on social media.

== Awards and nominations ==
Year	Work	Award	Category	Result
1987	Vietnam	AFI Award	Best Actor in a Miniseries	Won
1988	Fragments of War	AFI Award	Best Performance by an Actor in a Telefeature	Nominated
1989	Vietnam	Logie Award	Popular Actor in a Telemovie / Miniseries	Won
	G.P.	Penguin Award		Won
2000	Halifax f.p.: A Hate Worse than Death	AFI Award	Best Performance by an Actor in a Leading Role in a Telefeature or Miniseries	Nominated
2014	Jerusalem	Sydney Theatre Awards	Best Actor	Nominated

== Filmography ==
=== Film ===
Year	Title	Role	Notes
1983	Undercover	Frank Bugden	
1986	Run, Chrissie, Run!	Toe	
1986	Jenny Kissed Me	Steve Anderson	
1988	The Man from Snowy River II	Alistair Patton Jr.	
1989	Celia	Ray Carmichael	
1990	Prisoners of the Sun	Sergeant Keenan	
1990	Aya	Frank	
1995	Dad and Dave: On Our Selection	Cyril Riley	
2000	Savage Honeymoon	Mickey Savage	
2005	Still Life	Ron	Short film
2005	Jewboy	Isaac	

=== TV series ===
Year	Title	Role	Notes
1981–1982	Cop Shop	Constable Sam Phillips	138 episodes
1984	Kindred Spirits	Ben	TV movie
1984	Special Squad	Driscoll	1 episode
1985	The Henderson Kids	Uncle Mike Henderson	24 episodes
1985	The Lancaster Miller Affair	Bill Lancaster	Miniseries, 3 episodes
1987	Frontier	James Stephen	Miniseries, 3 episodes
1987	Vietnam	Phil Goddard	Miniseries, 10 episodes
1988	Australians	Folland	Miniseries, 2 episodes
1988	Fragments of War: The Story of Damien Parer	Damien Parer	TV movie
1989; 1996	G.P.	Dennis Harper / Emile	2 episodes
1990	Yellowthread Street	Finn	Episode 4: "Middleman"
1992	Tracks of Glory	Floyd MacFarland	Miniseries, 2 episodes
1992	Embassy	Edward Logan	Season 3, episode 9: "Man of Straw"
1993	A Country Practice	Dave Carmody	Season 13, 2 episodes
1994	Over the Hill	Don Spencer	
1994	Halifax f.p.: Words Without Music	Ian Moffat	TV movie, season 1, episode 2
1996	Medivac	Dr. Red Buchanan	15 episodes
1997	Frontier		Miniseries
1997	Adrenalin	Cyril Riley	TV movie
1998	A Difficult Woman	Peter MacFarlane	Miniseries, 3 episodes
2000	The Lost World	Kaysan	Season 1, episode 21: "Prophecy"
2000	Halifax f.p.: A Hate Worse Than Death	Ian Laser	TV movie, season 5, episode 3
2000	BeastMaster	Arkon	Season 2, episode 9: "Heart Like a Lion"
2006	The Society Murders	Damian Wales	TV movie
2011	Underbelly Files: The Man Who Got Away	Father John Brosnan	TV movie

== Theatre ==
Year	Title	Role	Notes
1979	The Three Sisters		Jane Street Theatre, Sydney, with NIDA
1979	The Caucasian Chalk Circle	The Easter Revolution – Architect / The Story of Grusha – Merchant / The Story of Azdak – Farmer	Sydney Opera House with STC & NIDA Jane Street Company
1979	The Fire Raisers		NIDA Theatre, Sydney
1979	Saved		Jane Street Theatre, Sydney with NIDA
1980	The Women Pirates Ann Bonney and Mary Read	Jack Rackham	NIDA Theatre, Sydney, University of Newcastle, Playhouse, Canberra with NIDA
1980	Strife	William Scantlebury	NIDA Theatre, Sydney, with STC
1982	Macbeth		Sydney Opera House
1983	True West		Q Theatre, Penrith
1983	The Sentimental Bloke		Q Theatre, Penrith
1983	In Duty Bound		Marian Street Theatre, Sydney
1984	Extremities	Raul	St Martins Youth Arts Centre, Melbourne, Space Theatre, Adelaide with Playbox
1985	The Glass Menagerie	The Gentleman Caller	Phillip Street Theatre, Sydney
1985	Pride and Prejudice		RQTC
1986	And a Nightingale Sang	Soldier	Sydney Opera House with Gary Penny Productions
1988	Othello	Cassio	Hyde Park Barracks, Sydney with Dramaturgical Services
1988	Death of a Salesman		Glen Street Theatre, Sydney, with Peter & Ellen Williams & Forest Theatre Company
1988	Don's Party	Don	Sydney Opera House, Melbourne Athenaeum with Gary Penny Productions, Hocking & Woods, & Kinselas Productions
1990	Cat on a Hot Tin Roof	Brick	Playhouse, Melbourne with MTC
1990	Three Sisters		Sydney Opera House with STC
1990	Present Laughter	Morris Dixon	Playhouse, Melbourne with MTC
1991	The Crucible	John Proctor	Suncorp Theatre, Brisbane with RQTC
1991; 1994	Furious		Wharf Theatre, Sydney, Malthouse Theatre, Melbourne, Space Theatre, Adelaide with STC
1992	Away		Blackfriars Theatre with STC
1992; 1993	Two Weeks with the Queen	Dad / Uncle Bob / Griff / Doctor	Wharf Theatre, Sydney, Playhouse, Adelaide, Ford Theatre, Geelong, Her Majesty's Theatre, Ballarat, Russell Street Theatre, Melbourne, with STC & MTC
1993; 1995; 1996	A Midsummer Night's Dream	Oberon	Royal Botanic Gardens, Melbourne, Royal Botanic Garden, Sydney with ASC
1993	The Crucible	John Proctor	Canberra Theatre with STC
1993	Summer of the Aliens	The Father	Wharf Theatre, Sydney, with STC
1997	Third World Blues		Sydney Opera House with STC
1997	Gulls		Playhouse, Adelaide with STCSA
1997	Gary's House		Adelaide Festival Centre with STCSA
1997–1998; 1999	The Taming of the Shrew		Royal Botanic Gardens, Melbourne, Royal Botanic Garden, Sydney with ASC
1999	Big Hair in America		The Butter Factory Theatre, Wodonga with HotHouse Theatre
2000	How I Learned to Drive		Space Theatre, Adelaide with STCSA
2001	Dinner with Friends		Marian Street Theatre, Sydney
2001	Mamma Mia!	Sam	Princess Theatre, Melbourne
2002	The Crucible	John Proctor	STCSA
2003	Myth, Propaganda and Disaster in Nazi Germany and Contemporary America	Talbot	Malthouse Theatre, Melbourne, Dunstan Playhouse, Adelaide, with Playbox & STCSA
2004	What the Butler Saw	Dr Prentice	Belvoir, Sydney
2004	Scenes from a Separation	Matthew Molyneux	Sydney Opera House with STC
2005	Two Brothers	Tom	Playhouse, Melbourne, Sydney Opera House, Playhouse, Canberra, Newcastle Civic Theatre, Glen Street Theatre, Sydney, Illawarra Performing Arts Centre with STC, MTC, CTC & Merrigong Theatre Company
2006	The Night Heron		Stables Theatre, Sydney with Scorch Theatre & Stablemates
2006	Holding the Man	Neil Armstrong / Scarecrow / Dick Conigrave / Bob Caleo / Derge / Woody / Franco / Doctor 1 / Theatre Director / NIDA Actor	Stables Theatre, Sydney, Sydney Opera House, Belvoir Street Theatre, Sydney, Brisbane Powerhouse, Malthouse Theatre, Melbourne, with Griffin Theatre Company
2010	Orestes 2.0	Menelaus	Stables Theatre, Sydney, with Cry Havoc & Griffin Independent
2010	Macbeth	Macbeth	Darlinghurst Theatre, Sydney
2013	Jerusalem	Rooster Byron	New Theatre, Sydney
2014	Scandalous Boy	Hadrian	The Street Theatre, Acton, Canberra
2015	Cock	Boyfriend's father	Old Fitzroy Theatre, Sydney, with Red Line Productions
