= The Year of the Locust =

2023 book by Terry Hayes

- Author: Terry Hayes
- Language: English
- Genre: Crime novel Thriller; Spy fiction
- Publisher: Penguin Books
- Publication date: November 2023
- Pages: 672
- ISBN: 978-0593064962

The Year of the Locust is the second novel by former journalist and screenwriter, Terry Hayes following his 2013 award-winning I Am Pilgrim. It was published on 9 November 2023.

== Synopsis ==
Ridley Kane (aka Ridley Walker) is a Denied Access Area spy for the CIA. He is sent into difficult areas to do what is required and get out again - by whatever means necessary. He is sent to the borders of Pakistan, Iran and Afghanistan to exfiltrate a valuable source. His mission is to find and extract an informant who can reveal the location of a new terrorist group, led by a mysterious figure known as the Emir. There he meets 'The Locust', a man with equally impressive skills who is the main antagonist of the novel.

== Reception ==
=== Critical response ===
Laura Wilson in The Guardian said: "The Year of the Locust starts promisingly with vivid descriptions, some terrific action sequences and lashings of suspense, there is plenty to entertain and distract you while you drum your fingers. But around three-quarters of the way through and with no prior warning, the plot takes a sideways leap and lands in an entirely different genre, which may leave you not so much intrigued as utterly bewildered."

James Owen in The Times was also positive on the start: "Within a few pages you are reminded how capably Hayes, the screenwriter of films such as Mad Max 2, sketches the canvas of remote Kiplingesque locales through which Walker and his ponies trot in the dark" and is more forgiving of the major plot twist: "my view is that Hayes has just built up enough credit... to carry us through".

Sue Turnbull in The Sydney Morning Herald called The Year of the Locust 'the most monumental spy thriller of the new millennium. As in this description of Jim, the head of analysis in the CIA war room, “a hard-driving forty-year-old with a face so rugged it looked like a long stretch of torn-up road”. Hard men, resilient women and lots of pain. The Year of the Locust is not for the faint-hearted. Enjoy: I did'.
