= Britnell =

Britnell is a surname. Notable people with the surname include:

- Adrian Britnell, Australian set designer and artist
- Frederick Britnell (1899–1980), British World War I flying ace
- Mark Britnell (born 1966), Expert in Global Healthcare Systems and Author
- Richard Britnell (1944–2013), British historian
- Roma Britnell (born 1967), Australian politician
