= Logie Awards of 1988 =

30th Logie Awards
- Date: 11 March 1988
- Site: Hyatt on Collins, Melbourne, Victoria
- Hosted by: Daryl Somers

Highlights
- Gold Logie: Kylie Minogue
- Hall of Fame: Bert Newton
- Most awards: Neighbours (4)

Television coverage
- Network: Nine Network

The 30th Annual TV Week Logie Awards was held on Friday 11 March 1988 at the Hyatt on Collins in Melbourne, and broadcast on the Nine Network. The ceremony was hosted by Daryl Somers and guests included Mickey Rooney and Bea Arthur.

== Winners ==
=== Gold Logie ===
Most Popular Personality on Australian Television
Winner: Kylie Minogue in Neighbours (Network Ten)
Nominees: Jason Donovan, Peter O'Brien, Daryl Somers

=== Acting ===
Most Popular Actor
Winner: Jason Donovan in Neighbours (Network Ten)

Most Popular Actress
Winner: Kylie Minogue in Neighbours (Network Ten)

Most Popular Actor in a Miniseries or Telemovie
Winner: Nicholas Eadie in Vietnam (Network Ten)

Most Popular Actress in a Miniseries or Telemovie
Winner: Nicole Kidman in Vietnam (Network Ten)

Most Outstanding Actor
Winner: John Wood in Rafferty's Rules (Seven Network)

Most Outstanding Actress
Winner: Catherine Wilkin in Rafferty's Rules (Seven Network)

Most Popular New Talent
Winner: Alex Papps in The Henderson Kids (Network Ten)

=== Most Popular Programs/Videos ===
Most Popular Australian Drama
Winner: Neighbours (Network Ten)

Most Popular Single Telemovie or Miniseries
Winner: Vietnam (Network Ten)

Most Popular Light Entertainment Program
Winner: Hey Hey It's Saturday (Nine Network)

Most Popular Public Affairs Program
Winner: 60 Minutes (Nine Network)

Most Popular Sports Coverage
Winner: Cricket (Nine Network)

Most Popular Children's Program
Winner: Wombat (Seven Network)

Most Popular Music Video
Winner: "Locomotion" by Kylie Minogue

=== Most Outstanding Programs ===
Most Outstanding Single Documentary or Documentary Series
Winner: Suzi's Story (Network Ten)

Most Outstanding Achievement in News
Winner: "Hoddle St Massacre" (Seven Network)

Most Outstanding Achievement in Public Affairs
Winner: Four Corners (ABC TV)

Most Outstanding Contribution by a Regional Station
Winner: Richmond Vale Railway (NBN-3, Newcastle)

== Performers ==
- David Atkins and Electric Legs
- Ricky May

== Hall of Fame ==
After a lifetime in the Australian television industry, Bert Newton became the fifth inductee into the TV Week Logies Hall of Fame.
