= The Harp in the South =

1948 novel by Ruth Park

- First UK edition (publ. Michael Joseph)
- Author: Ruth Park
- Language: English
- Genre: Fiction
- Publisher: Angus & Robertson, Australia
- Publication date: 1948
- Publication place: Australia
- Media type: Print
- Pages: 229 pp
- ISBN: 0-14-010456-9
- Preceded by: –
- Followed by: Poor Man's Orange

The Harp in the South is the debut novel by New Zealand-born Australian author Ruth Park. Published in 1948, it portrays the life of a Catholic Irish Australian family living in the Sydney suburb of Surry Hills, which was at that time an inner city slum.

== Publication history ==
The Harp in the South was published, initially, in the Sydney Morning Herald in twelve daily instalments, beginning on 4 January 1947, after winning a competition run by that newspaper. The prize was £2,000, and there were 175 entries.

It was controversial, with readers writing to the newspaper, on the basis of the synopsis, even before the serialisation started. Delia Falconer writes that The Herald published "forty-three responses, a symposium, and a daily tally of pro and con letters (sixty-eight for; fifty-four against)". It was published in book form in 1948 by Angus & Robertson, who baulked at the novel but "had to honour a ‘gentleman’s agreement’ to publish the winner".

Nonetheless, it has become a classic and has never been out of print.

== Characters ==
Hughie Darcy:
Married to Margaret Darcy. Hughie often becomes drunk after work and his best friend is Patrick Diamond, even though Patrick is Protestant and he is Catholic. He is the father of Rowena and Dolour. Hughie wants to get out of Surry Hills and back to the bush but he has a family to support so is trapped.
Margaret “Mumma” Darcy:
Mother of Rowena and Dolour, mother-in-law of Charlie Rothe. She is a devout Catholic and although generally accepting, sometimes fights with Patrick Diamond (their lodger) over his religious beliefs.
Rowena "Roie" Darcy:
Married to Charlie Rothe, they have one child, Moira, known as “Motty”. In her youth, she was courted by Tommy Mendel, but after sleeping with her, he disappeared. Roie secretly works at two jobs to save enough for an abortion when she discovers she is expecting Tommy's baby, but at the last minute cannot go through with it. On her way home, she is attacked and savagely beaten by a group of sailors and loses the baby.
Charlie Rothe:
Charlie is assumed to be part Aboriginal although he does not know his parents as he was taken away as a baby and put in a home. He is married to Rowena Darcy whom he met when her younger sister, Dolour took part in a radio quiz show, "Junior Information Please". Roie was feeling sick and he helped her outside for air. Charlie knows there is no racial prejudice with Roie but Margaret does not accept him at first and Dolour is angry with him for stealing Roie from her.
Dolour Darcy:
Dolour is the youngest in her family. A very bright girl, she aspires to get a good education and escape from Surry Hills. She is aunty to "Motty" Roie's child and good friends with elderly Chinese greengrocer, Lick Jimmy.
Patrick Diamond:
The Darcy’s fervent Protestant lodger. Every St. Patrick's day, he gets drunk and verbally abuses Mrs. Darcy. When he suffers a stroke, Lick Jimmy performs an emergency 'bleed' by cutting open a vein to ease the pressure. Pat was unaware of this, as he had passed out because Hughie, also drunk, had hit him.
Miss Sheily:
Mother to disabled Johnny Sheily, she constantly abuses him. When he is knocked down and killed she seems relieved rather than upset. Later, Roie sees her flagellating herself and crying Johnny's name. She marries a Swedish man named Gunnarson.

== Sequel and prequel ==
In 1949, Ruth Park published Poor Man's Orange as a sequel to The Harp in the South. A prequel, Missus, was published in 1985.

== Adaptations ==
=== 1949 stage adaptation ===
See The Harp in the South (play)

=== 1951 Radio Adaptation ===
See The Harp in the South (radio serial).

=== 1964 British TV version ===
See The Harp in the South (British TV play)

=== 1986 miniseries ===
The Harp in the South was adapted into a miniseries by Eleanor Witcombe, produced by Anthony Buckley and directed by George Whaley, and broadcast by Network Ten in 1986. This was followed by its sequel Poor Man's Orange, which was also adapted into a miniseries in 1987. The Harp in the South and Poor Man's Orange have been released by Roadshow Entertainment as a 3-DVD package.

DVD cover

==== Cast ====
Cast	Role
Anne Phelan	Mumma Darcy
Martyn Sanderson	Hughie Darcy
Anna Hruby	Roie Darcy
Kaarin Fairfax	Dolour Darcy
Gwen Plumb	Grandma Kilker
Syd Conabere	Pat Diamond
Melissa Jaffer	Miss. Sheily
Shane Connor	Charlie Rothe
Brandon Burke	Tommy Mendel
Ken Radley	Johnny Sheily
Lois Ramsay	Mrs. Campion
Cecil Parkee	Lick Jimmy
Carole Skinner	Delie Stock
Charles Tingwell	Father Cooley
John Clayton	Jim
Lyn Collingwood	Nursing Sister

=== 2014 stage script adaptation ===
In 2013 and 2014 G.bod Theatre in association with NIDA Independent, developed a new adaptation of Ruth Park's original novel. This was the first adaptation approved by Ruth Park's estate since 1949. An invited audience saw the development in progress, at NIDA, in both 2013 and 2014. The development was written and directed by Peter Mountford but has yet to be staged.

=== 2018 stage adaptation ===
Kate Mulvany adapted The Harp in the South, its prequel and sequel into a six-hour play over two-parts. It was first produced by the Sydney Theatre Company at the Roslyn Packer Theatre from August 2018, directed by Kip Williams.
