= Anne Phelan =

Australian actress (1948–2019)

Anne Phelan OAM
- Phelan in her iconic role in "Prisoner" as Myra Desmond
- Born: Anne Mary Phelan; 2 August 1948; Melbourne, Victoria, Australia
- Died: 27 October 2019 (aged 71); Bendigo, Victoria, Australia
- Occupation: Actress
- Years active: 1968–2019
- Notable credits: Prisoner; The Harp in the South; Poor Man's Orange; Something in the Air; Neighbours
- Children: 1

Anne Mary Phelan (2 August 1948 – 27 October 2019) was an Australian actress of stage and screen who appeared in many theatre, television and film productions as well as radio and voice-over.

She was best known internationally for her role as prison inmate and top dog Myra Desmond in Prisoner (1980–1985), and for the 1988 miniseries Poor Man's Orange.

== Early life ==
Phelan was raised in Fitzroy, Victoria. She was reported as saying that she had no formal study or qualifications for acting or singing, but instead had trained through 15 years work in amateur theatre. At age 16, she became pregnant and gave her daughter up for adoption, seeing her again for the first time 50 years later.

== Career ==
Phelan began her television career in 1968. She had an ongoing role in the local soap opera Bellbird as Kate Ashwood in the early 1970s.

In the late 1970s, Phelan played guest roles in Prisoner, first appearing as Officer Manson, in a 1979 episode of the series. Later that year, she played the role of dopey prisoner Bernadette in a number of episodes. She began appearing as recurring character Myra Desmond between 1980 and 1983. Myra was then reintroduced to the series in early 1984 as a regular character and Phelan continued in the role for a further 18 months.

Undated photo of Phelan

Phelan starred in 1988 miniseries Poor Man's Orange, based on the 1949 novel by Ruth Park. The role saw her win a 1988 Australian Film Institute Award.

Phelan's other soap roles included Starting Out (1983), Family and Friends (1990) and Something in the Air (2000–2002). She won the AACTA Award for Best Lead Actress in a Television Drama in 2000 for her role as Monica Taylor in the latter.

Phelan guest starred in numerous drama series, including The Flying Doctors and Blue Heelers. She was also a regular on Marshall Law and appeared in the ABC comedy Mother and Son, playing the role of a social worker who befriends Maggie Beare.

Phelan also made two guest appearances in Neighbours. The first, in 1997, was as Claudia Harvey and the second, in 2004, was as Doreen 'Peace Dove' Cassidy. In 2007, she appeared in an episode of The Librarians, as a prisoner with the Prisoner theme song.

In 2012, Phelan joined the cast of comedy drama Winners & Losers in the ongoing role of Dot Gross. Winners & Losers marked her first regular role in 10 years. Prior to this, she had appeared in several theatre productions and made various television guest appearances.

== Community work ==
Phelan was a public speaker and a recipient of Regional Arts Victoria's Don Mackay Award (2006) for Outstanding Achievement in Regional Touring.

From 2000, she was the patron of Positive Women (Victoria), a support and advocacy group run by and for women living with HIV. She received the Oz Showbiz Cares / Equity Fights AIDS 2002 Activist of the Year Award for outstanding contribution to the fight against HIV/AIDS.

Phelan performed and sang with the Choir of Hard Knocks on Melbourne's streets in 2006, busking to raise money for a performance at the Melbourne Town Hall. She was a member of Actors for Refugees, a group of performers who volunteer their time and talent to tell the stories of Australia's refugees and asylum seekers. She was an ambassador for Alzheimer's Australia VIC, educators, advocates and spokespeople for those living with dementia, their families and friends and those who support them.

== Death ==
Phelan died of natural causes, on 27 October 2019. She was 71 at her time of death, although, some sources have stated her age as 75. She was privately cremated.

== Filmography ==
=== Film ===
| Year | Title | Role | Notes |
|---|---|---|---|
| 1976 | The Devil's Playground | Girl in pub | |
| 1980 | Hard Knocks | | |
| 1985 | I Live with Me Dad | Mrs | |
| 1997 | The Balanced Particle Freeway | Highest Tree (voice) | |
| 1998 | Edithvale | Mrs Vale | |
| 1999 | The Craic | Truck Driver | |
| 2009 | Inanimate Objects | 'Mum' Patterson | |
| 2009 | Charlie & Boots | Female Truckie | |
| 2019 | Ride Like a Girl | | |

=== Television ===
| Year | Title | Role | Notes | Ref. |
|---|---|---|---|---|
| 1968 | The Battlers | Ma Tyrell | | |
| 1972 | Matlock Police | Nurse / Policewoman Williams | 2 episodes | |
| 1973 | Ryan | Betty | | |
| 1973; 1974 | Homicide | Waitress / Valmai Dunn | 2 episodes | |
| 1973; 1974 | Division 4 | Mardi Campbell / Maria Ponti | 2 episodes | |
| 1973; 1974 | Matlock Police | Nancy Wells / WPC Winifred Drew / Molly | 3 episodes | |
| 1974–1977 | Bellbird | Kate Ashwood | | |
| 1975 | Matlock Police | Ellen | | |
| 1976 | The Sentimental Bloke | Mabel | TV film | |
| 1979 | Skyways | Joan Hailey | Episode: "We Can Face It Together" | |
| 1979 | Prisoner | Officer Manson | Episode #1.17 | |
| 1980 | Prisoner | Bernadette | Episodes 94–95 | |
| 1980–1985 | Prisoner | Myra Desmond | | |
| 1981 | Holiday Island | | 1 episode | |
| 1982 | A Country Practice | Rita Parsons | 2 episodes | |
| 1982 | Sons and Daughters | Tenant | | |
| 1983 | Carson's Law | | | |
| 1983 | A Descant for Gossips | Mrs. Lalor | Miniseries | |
| 1983 | Starting Out | Mrs. De Soosa | | |
| 1984 | Special Squad | | | |
| 1986 | The Fast Lane | Beth | Episode: "Following by Example" | |
| 1987 | The Harp in the South | Mumma Darcy | | |
| 1987 | Poor Man's Orange | Mumma Darcy | | |
| 1988 | Mother and Son | Wilma | Episode: "The Friend" | |
| 1988 | The Bartons | Mrs. Frawley | Episode: "Beautiful Beetroot" | |
| 1988 | The Flying Doctors | Rosie | | |
| 1989 | G.P. | Dulcie | | |
| 1989 | Dearest Enemy | Mother | | |
| 1989 | Inside Running | Justine | | |
| 1989 | The Flying Doctors | Lorraine | | |
| 1990 | Family and Friends | | Dawn Rossi | |
| 1990 | Skirts (TV series) | Mrs. Donovan | | |
| 1991 | The Flying Doctors | Beryl Horden | | |
| 1991 | Kelly | Rosie | Episode: "The Bird Thieves" | |
| 1991 | Col'n Carpenter | Mrs Fuller | | |
| 1992 | Late for School | Mrs. Dicks | | |
| 1992 | Boys from the Bush | Betty | Episode: "Dancing in the Dark" | |
| 1994 | Blue Heelers | Mrs. Brady | Episode: "Life After Death" | |
| 1994 | Law of the Land | Mrs. Bickerton / Gracie Morrison | | |
| 1996–1998 | Blue Heelers | Jeannie O'Dwyer | | |
| 1996 | The Man from Snowy River | Nell Frampton | Episode: "The Grand Duke" | |
| 1997 | Good Guys, Bad Guys | Maisie | Episode: "Gone to the Dogs" | |
| 1997 | Simone de Beauvoir's Babies | Postie | 2 episodes | |
| 1997 | Neighbours | Claudia Harvey | | |
| 1999 | The Micallef Programme | Madame Pogg in 'Spiffington Manse' | | |
| 2000 | Thunderstone | Proprietress | 2 episodes | |
| 2000 | Dogwoman | Joan Jarvis | | |
| 2000–2002 | Something in the Air | Monica Taylor | | |
| 2002 | Marshall Law | Esther Hirsh Q.C. | | |
| 2003 | Welcher & Welcher | Mrs. Cohen | Episode: "Adam's Rib" | |
| 2004–2005 | Neighbours | Doreen Cassidy | | |
| 2007 | The Librarians | Big Bertha | Episode: "And Nothing But the Truth" | |
| 2010 | Sleuth 101 | Pat | Episode: "A Tan to Die For" | |
| 2012–2015 | Winners & Losers | Dot Gross | | |
| 2014 | Worst Year of My Life Again | Aunt Ethel | Episode: "Christmas" | |
| 2015 | Sammy J & Randy in Ricketts Lane | Mrs Tuppens | Episode: "Dances with Wolves" | |

=== Television variety specials ===
| Year | Title | Role | Notes |
|---|---|---|---|
| | Something Special | Solo singing | |
| | Frankie Howerd Specials | Comedy sketches | |
| | The Glitter Sisters | Singing group | |

== Stage ==
| Year | Title | Role | Notes | Ref. |
|---|---|---|---|---|
| | Tune in Tomorrow | Music Revue | Don McKay Productions | |
| | Embers | Play reading | Hothouse Theatre | |
| | Over There | Workshop | Playbox Theatre, Melbourne | |
| | Romeo and Juliet | Nurse | MTC | |
| | I Do, In Caroline Springs | Joy | Chapel Off Chapel, Melbourne | |
| | Cinderella – An Adult Pantomime | | Capers Dinner Theatre | |
| 1970s | The Glitter Sisters | | Tikki and John's Theatre Restaurant, Melbourne season | |
| 1970 | Once Upon a Mattress | | Monash Theatre | |
| 1971 | Cabaret | Frau Kost | Her Majesty's Theatre, Adelaide | |
| 1971 | I Do, I Do | Agnes | Cottage Theatre (SA) | |
| 1972 | Birds on the Wing | | St Martins Theatre, Melbourne | |
| 1972 | A Good Night's Sleep / Don't Walk Around Stark Naked | Annette / Clarisse | St Martins Theatre, Melbourne | |
| 1972 | Salad Days | | St Martins Theatre, Melbourne | |
| 1972 | Twelve Angry Women | | St Martins Theatre, Melbourne | |
| 1972 | The Patrick Pearce Motel | Niamh | St Martins Theatre, Melbourne | |
| 1973 | All My Sons | | St Martins Theatre, Melbourne with MTC | |
| 1973 | Flash Jim Vaux | Nell | Russell St Theatre, Melbourne with MTC | |
| 1974 | Sweet Fanny Adams | | Le Chat Noir Theatre Restaurant, Melbourne | |
| 1976 | Billabong Bill | | Monash University, Melbourne | |
| 1978 | Oh / Let Me In | Sue / Mil | Playbox Theatre, Melbourne with Hoopla Theatre Foundation | |
| 1978 | Alice in Wonderland | Sister / Caterpillar / Duchess (puppeteer) | Pilgrim Puppet Theatre, Melbourne | |
| 1978–1979 | Cabaret | Sally Bowles | Actors' Company Theatre, Sydney | |
| 1979 | Gentlemen Only | Freddie | Playbox Theatre, Melbourne with Hoopla Theatre Foundation | |
| 1979–1980 | Flexitime | Beryl | Australian tour with Victorian Arts Council | |
| 1980 | Kiss Me Goodnight, Sergeant Major | | Stage Door Theatre Restaurant, Melbourne | |
| 1981 | 1945 Hollywood Canteen | | Stage Door Theatre Restaurant, Melbourne | |
| 1981 | Mourning Becomes Electra: Part One | Louisa Ames | Melbourne Athenaeum with MTC | |
| 1981 | Pete McGynty and the Dreamtime | Mrs Plenty / Others | Melbourne Athenaeum with MTC | |
| 1981 | The Good Person of Setzuan | Mrs Young | Melbourne Athenaeum with MTC | |
| 1981 | Amadeus | Teresa Salieri / others | Melbourne Athenaeum with MTC | |
| 1981–1982 | A Cuckoo in the Nest | Gladys | Melbourne Athenaeum with MTC | |
| 1982 | Stevie | Stevie Smith | Monash University, Melbourne with Victorian Arts Council | |
| 1982–1983 | On Our Selection | Mum | Melbourne Athenaeum with MTC | |
| 1985 | Season's Greetings | Rachael | Russell St Theatre, Melbourne with MTC | |
| 1986–1987 | Away | Gwen | Studio Theatre, Melbourne & VIC regional tour with Victorian Arts Council | |
| 1987 | Twelfth Night | Maria | Playhouse, Melbourne with MTC | |
| 1988 | Dinkum Assorted | Grace | Sydney Opera House, Playhouse, Melbourne with STC / MTC | |
| 1989 | A Family Affair | Agrafena | Northside Theatre, Sydney | |
| 1990 | This Old Man Comes Rolling Home | Laurie | Russell St Theatre, Melbourne with MTC | |
| 1992 | Diving for Pearls | Barb | Space Theatre, Adelaide with STCSA | |
| 1993 | Meekatharra | Abbie | Playhouse, Perth with Black Swan State Theatre Company, Perth | |
| 1994 | The Grapes of Wrath | Ma Joad | Playhouse, Melbourne with MTC | |
| 1994 | A Hard Act to Follow | One woman show | La Mama, Melbourne | |
| 1995 | Gigi | Inez Alvarez | Suncorp Theatre, Brisbane with QTC | |
| 1995 | Aftershocks | Lyn | Fairfax Studio, Melbourne with MTC | |
| 1996 | Sweeney Todd | Mrs Lovett | Suncorp Piazza, Brisbane, Suncorp Theatre, Brisbane with QTC | |
| 1997 | A Hard God | Aggie Cassidy | Playhouse, Adelaide with STCSA | |
| 1998 | Mechtron: Education from Womb to Tomb | Lou Jade | Brunswick Mechanics Institute, Melbourne with Community Theatre | |
| 1998 | Dream Kitchen | Solo show | La Mama, Melbourne | |
| 1999 | Elegies for Angels, Punks and Raging Queens | | Melbourne Athenaeum | |
| 1999 | Wonderful Ward | Vera | Melbourne International Comedy Festival | |
| 2002 | Hats Off 2002 | Actor / Singer | National Theatre, Melbourne | |
| 2003 | Mavis Goes to Timor | Mavis Taylor | Australian tour with Playbox Theatre Company | |
| 2003 | Something to Declare | | Malthouse Theatre, Melbourne | |
| 2004 | Hats Off! to Sondheim 2004: I'm Still Here | | National Theatre, Melbourne | |
| 2005 | If I Should Die Before I Wake | Joan | Eastbank Centre, Shepparton with Auspicious Arts Projects | |
| 2006 | Faith | Grace | Wesley Church, Melbourne with The Torch Project | |
| 2006 | In the Family | Marion | St Martins Youth Arts Centre, Melbourne | |
| 2006–2007 | An Accidental Actress | Self (biographical) | Australian tour with Hothouse Theatre | |
| 2007 | Fiddler on the Roof | Yente | St. James Theatre, Wellington, Civic Theatre, Auckland | |
| 2008 | Ozmade Musicals Concert 2008 | | Melbourne Athenaeum with Magnormos | |
| 2008; 2009 | Guys and Dolls | General Cartwright | Princess Theatre, Melbourne, Capitol Theatre, Sydney | |
| 2008–2010 | Hats Off! | Soloist | National Theatre, Melbourne | |
| 2009 | The Vagina Monologues | | National Theatre, Melbourne | |
| 2010 | Dirty Dusting | Olive | Casula Powerhouse, Sydney with Ellis Productions | |
| 2010 | Do Not Go Gentle | Wilson | Fortyfivedownstairs, Melbourne | |

== Radio and voice ==
- ABC Book readings include: Down by the Dockside and The Harp in the South
- Serials and plays including the production of the one-woman-play Dream Kitchen
- Narrator for Visions of Yankalilla, a documentary for Flaming Star Pictures and the documentary series Grey Voyagers, for SBS
- TV monologue – The Agony and the Ecstasy, for the ABC

== Corporate ==
- Anti-Cancer Council Breast Health Video

== Awards and honours ==
=== Honours ===
- Medal of the Order of Australia (OAM) in the 2007 Queen's Birthday Honours list for service to the arts as an actress, and to the community, particularly through support for women living with the HIV virus and for asylum seekers and refugees.
- Inducted into the Victorian Honour Roll of Women in 2008.
- Included in Who's Who in Australia since 2006.

=== Awards and nominations ===
| Year | Association | Category | Work / nominee | Result | Ref |
|---|---|---|---|---|---|
| 1984 | Penguin Award | Best Performance by an Actress in a Supporting Role in a Serial | Prisoner | Won | |
| 1985 | Penguin Award | Best Performance by an Actress in a Leading Role in a Serial | Prisoner | Won | |
| 1987 | Australian Film Institute Awards | Best Performance by an Actress in a Mini Series | The Harp in the South | Nominated | |
| 1987 | Penguin Award | Performance by a Female Actor in a Principal Role in a One-off Drama | The Harp in the South | Won | |
| 1987 | Variety Club Heart Awards | Variety Club Television Actress of the Year | —N/a | Won | |
| 1988 | Australian Film Institute Awards | Best Performance by an Actress in a Mini Series | Poor Man's Orange | Won | |
| 1988 | Penguin Award | Best Actress in a One-off Drama | Poor Man's Orange | Won | |
| | Green Room Award | Best Actress in a Supporting Role (Drama) | Season's Greetings | Won | |
| 2000 | Australian Film Institute Awards | Best Actress in a Leading Role in a Television Drama | Something in the Air; Episode: "We Will Remember Them" | Won | |
| 2002 | Oz Showbiz Cares / Equity Fights AIDS | Activist of the Year | —N/a | Won | |
| 2006 | Regional Arts Victoria Don Mackay Award | Outstanding Achievement in Regional Touring | —N/a | Won | |
| 2016 | Media, Entertainment and Arts Alliance | Equity Lifetime Achievement Award | —N/a | Won | |
