= Anna Hruby =

Australian actress

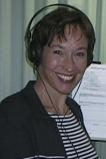
- Born: October 1960 (age 65); Australia
- Occupations: Actress; voice artist; television commercial advertiser
- Years active: 1969–present
- Family: Joy Hruby (mother)

Anna Hruby (born October 1960) is an Australian actress and voice over artist and TV commercial advertiser, who has appeared in many Australian films, television series and theatre productions. She is the daughter of actress, entertainer and television personality Joy Hruby and Czech jazz pianist Zdenek Hruby.

== Career ==
Hruby's first recurring role as a child actor was in the TV miniseries Seven Little Australians. She featured in the TV serial The Young Doctors as Sandy Pearce, girlfriend of Roger Gordon in from 1977 to 1978. Hruby then achieved recognition for her role in Prisoner as Paddy Lawson.

She has also appeared in TV series such as Sons and Daughters as Tracy Kingsford, A Country Practice, All Saints, Cop Shop and mini-series such as The Harp in the South and Poor Man's Orange. She was a regular cast member on Home and Away, playing Judith Ackroyd and Fireflies, playing Rebekah Sharp.

Hruby also works as a voice-over artist in advertisements and television network promotions for Foxtel and Channel 7. She is the current voice artist for Telstra, Australia's largest telecommunications company. Often known as 'The Telstra Lady', she provides a majority of recorded messages for Telstra, such as "Your call could not be connected" and other menu prompts. Anna is also the voice in most of the self service checkouts in supermarkets in Australia.

== Filmography ==
FILM

| Year | Title | Role | Type |
|---|---|---|---|
| 1978 | Silverbird | | Film Short |
| 1979 | Cathy's Child | Delia | Feature film |
| 1979 | The Journalist | Sarah | Feature film |
| 1989 | Action Replay | | Feature film |
| 1990 | Sonnet | | Film short |
| 1992 | De Anima | | Film short |
| 2001 | Melancholy | | Film short |
| 2012 | Straight | Mum | Film short |
| 2016 | Down Under | Stacey's Mum | Feature film |

TELEVISION

| Year | Title | Role | Type |
|---|---|---|---|
| 1969 | Hans Christian Anderson | | Teleplay |
| 1973 | Seven Little Australians | Nell Wolcott | TV miniseries, 10 episodes |
| 1974 | The Evil Touch | Child | TV series, episode 25: "They" |
| 1975 | Behind the Legend | Younger sister | TV series, episode 6: "Henry Handel Richardson |
| 1976 | The Outsiders | Denny Gosser | TV series, episode 7: "The Bush Boy" |
| 1977 | The Sullivans | Hilda Phipson | TV series, 22 episodes |
| 1977–78 | The Young Doctors | Sandy Pearce | TV series, 23 episodes |
| 1978 | Chopper Squad | First Girl | TV series, episode 10: "J Is for Julie" |
| 1978 | Case for the Defence | Christobel | TV series, episode 6: "Made for Each Other" |
| 1980 | The Restless Years | Sally Kennedy | TV series, 3 episodes |
| 1981 | Sporting Chance | | TV series, episode 7: "A Perfect Ten" |
| 1981 | Bellamy | Beth | TV series, episode 21: "Come Fly with Me' |
| 1981 | Cop Shop | Lynda Rowland | TV series, 2 episodes |
| 1981 | Skyways | Sharon Webster | TV series, episode 177 |
| 1982; 1984; 1993 | A Country Practice | Dianne Nelson | TV series, Season 2; episodes 21 & 22: "Never Called Me Mother" |
| 1982–83 | Prisoner | Paddy Lawson | TV series, 36 episodes |
| 1984; 1993 | A Country Practice | Lucy Taylor | TV series, Season 4; episodes 59 & 60: "Close to the Bone" |
| 1985 | Sons and Daughters | Tracy Kingsford | TV series, 10 episodes |
| 1987 | Rafferty's Rules | Di Mulroney | TV series, 1 episode |
| 1987 | The Harp in the South | Roie Darcy | TV miniseries, 3 episodes |
| 1987 | Fields of Fire | Kate | TV miniseries, 2 episodes |
| 1987 | Poor Man's Orange | Roie Rothe | TV miniseries, 2 episodes |
| 1988 | Fragments of War: The Story of Damien Parer | Meg | TV movie |
| 1988 | Richmond Hill | | TV series, 2 episodes |
| 1989 | E Street | Diane Thompson | TV series, 2 episodes |
| 1989 | The Flying Doctors | Karen Palmer | TV series, Season 5; episode 15: "Sky Above, Earth Below" |
| 1991; 1994 | G.P. | Caroline | TV series, Season 3; episode 28: "The View from Up Here" |
| 1992 | Big Ideas | FACS Woman | TV movie |
| 1992–94 | Sunday Joyride | Herself | TV series, 5 episodes |
| 1993 | A Country Practice | Judy Colmer | TV series, Season 13; episodes 83 & 84: "New Kid in Town" |
| 1993 | Lighting 'Dances with Wolves' with Dean Semler | Narrator | Video |
| 1994 | G.P. | Jan White | TV series, Season 6; 1 episode 24: "In Good Hands" |
| 1995 | Janus | Madelaine Conner | TV series, Season 2; 1episode 12: "Mute by Visitation" |
| 1996 | Police Rescue | Robyn | TV series, Season 5; episode 9: "The Only Constant" |
| 1997 | Heartbreak High | Sharon Itkin | TV series, episode 24 |
| 1998–2008 | All Saints | Bridget Mortimer | TV series, Season 1, episode 40: "Hard Rain" |
| 1998 | Children's Hospital | Maria Voyt | TV series, episode 7: "Future Shock" |
| 1999–2000 | Home And Away | Judith Ackroyd | TV series, 44 episodes |
| 2001 | All Saints | Sandra Connolly | TV series, Season 4, 4 episodes |
| 2004 | Fireflies | Rebekah Sharp | TV series, 21 episodes |
| 2004 | Joy's World | Guest | TV series, 2 episodes |
| 2008 | All Saints | Nicole Templeton | TV series, Season 11, 2 episodes |
| 2011 | Blood Brothers | Mother | TV movie |
| 2017 | Ten News | Herself – Joy Hruby Funeral Service | TV series, 1 episode |
| 2017 | The Project | Herself – Joy Hruby Funeral Service | TV series, 1 episode |
| 2022 | Talking Prisoner | Herself | Podcast series, 1 episode |
