= Behind the Legend =

Television series

- Created by: John Martin
- Written by: Thomas Keneally; Cliff Green
- Presented by: Manning Clark
- Country of origin: Australia
- Original language: English
- No. of episodes: 38

Production
- Producer: Alan Burke

Original release
- Network: ABC
- Release: 18 September 1972 – 1975

Behind the Legend is a 1972 anthology series based on the lives of various Australians hosted by Manning Clark.

It was originally called The History Makers.

== Cast ==
=== Host ===
- Manning Clark

=== Recurring ===
- Barry Lovett as George Coppin / Dobie (S1–3, 3 episodes)
- Ben Gabriel as John Monash (S1&3, 2 episodes)
- James Condon as Wentworth (S1–3, 3 episodes)
- Joe James as Walter Burley Griffin (S2&3, 2 episodes)
- John Hargreaves as Tom Roberts (S1&3, 2 episodes)
- Joseph Fürst as Ferdinand von Mueller (S2&3, 2 episodes)
- Ken Fraser as Charles Fitzroy (S1&2, 2 episodes)
- Michael Long as Heir (S1&3, 2 episodes)
- Paul Bertram as Percy Grainger (S1&3, 2 episodes)
- Reg Evans as C. J. Dennis / John Shaw Neilson at 40 (S1&3, 2 episodes)
- Robyn Nevin (S2&3, 2 episodes)
- Terry Bader as Sidney Kidman (S1&3, 2 episodes)

=== Season One ===
- Anna Volska as Helena Rubinstein
- Anne Haddy as Caroline Chisholm
- Anne-Louise Lambert
- Barbara Frawley
- Bud Tingwell as Arthur Phillip
- Jack Thompson as Charles Kingsford-Smith
- John Frawley as Thomas Blamey
- John Orcsik
- Kate Fitzpatrick as Nellie Melba
- Keith Lee as Charles O'Connor
- Kevin Wilson as Les Darcy
- Mark Kelly as Douglas Mawson
- Max Phipps as member of Parliament
- Neil Fitzpatrick as Charles Ulm
- John Morris as J. F. Archibald
- Penne Hackforth-Jones as Helena Rubinstein
- Tim Eliott as Henry Lawson
- Tony Barry

=== Season Two ===
- Aileen Britton as Lady Mitchell
- Alister Smart as Frank Gardiner
- Brian James as Governor William Bligh
- Cornelia Frances
- Dennis Grosvenor as Kevin Todd
- Don Crosby as Protector of Aborigines
- Drew Forsythe as Ted Baxter
- Elizabeth Alexander as Elizabeth Kenny
- Frank Lloyd as Eddie Gilbert
- Graeme Blundell as Ray Parer
- Gordon Chater as Sir Thomas Mitchell
- Jack Charles as Eddie Gilbert
- John Ewart as Francis Greenway
- Lola Brooks as Mary Reibey
- Nick Tate as Captain Sanderson
- Nigel Lovell as John Flynn
- Peter Gwynne
- Richard Meikle
- Tony Allyn as Robert O'Hara Burke
- Max Osbiston

=== Season Three ===
- Andrew McFarlane
- Anna Hruby as Younger Sister
- Carole Skinner
- John Gaden as S. T. Gill
- John Fegan
- Judi Farr as Harriet
- Judy McBurney as Waitress
- Kevin Miles as G.V. Brooke
- Kit Taylor
- Lisa Peers as Annette Kellerman
- Liz Burch as Mary
- Liz Chance as Henry Handel Richardson (Ethel Florence Lindesay Richardson)
- Lynette Curran as Belle
- Margo Lee as Miss Brennan
- Mark Lee as Maurice Kellerman
- Melissa Jaffer
- Natalie Bate as Ann Rumsby
- Pamela Stephenson as Fanny Cathcart
- Paul Mason as Matthew Flinders
- Ralph Cotterill as Hal Gye
- Robin Ramsay as Marcus Clarke
- Wendy Hughes
- Wynn Roberts as Christopher Brennan
- Max Osbiston

== Select episodes ==
=== Season One ===
(Dates are Sydney air dates)

1. Nellie Melba (18 Sept 1972) - by James Workman
2. Henry Lawson (25 Sept 1972) - by Cliff Green
3. Les Darcy (2 Oct 1972)
4. Charles Ulm (9 Oct 1972) - by James Workman
5. Douglas Mawson (16 Oct 1972) - by Thomas Kenealley, directed by John Croystn
6. John Monash (23 October 1972) - by Tony Morphett
7. Charles O'Connor (30 Oct 1972) - by James Workman, directed by Frank Arnold
8. Caroline Chisolm (6 Nov 1972) - by John Pooley, directed by Frank Arnold
9. John Shaw Neilson (13 Nov 1972) - by Margaret Kelly
10. J. F. Archibald (20 Nov 1972)
11. Thomas Blamey (27 Nov 1972) - by Lance Peters, directed by Frank Arnold
12. Helena Rubenstein (4 Dec 1972) by Cole Thompson, directed by Alan Burke
13. Arthur Phillip (11 Dec 1972) (final)

=== Season Two ===
(Dates are Sydney air dates)

1. Francis Greenaway (5 March 1974)
2. Elizabeth Kenny (12 March 1974)
3. Ray Parer (19 March 1974) - by Laurence Johns and James Workman, directed by Rob Stewart
4. William Bligh (26 March 1974) - by Thomas Keneally
5. Frank Gardiner (2 April 1974)
6. Sir Thomas Mitchell (9 April 1974)
7. J. F. Archibald (16 April 1974) - by Brian Wright, directed by Bill Munro (possibly repeat previous year)
8. Ferdinand von Mueller (23 April 1974)
9. Eddie Gilbert (30 April 1974) - by Philip Grenville Mann. ** (was scheduled but postponed)
10. Robert O'Hara Burke (7 May 1974)
11. Charles Fitzroy (14 May 1974) - by Mary Wright
12. Mary Reibey (21 May 1974) - by Barbara Vernon, directed by Bruce Best. GS Lola Brooks.
13. John Flynn (28 May 1974)
14. Percy Grainger (4 June 1974) (final) ** (was scheduled but postponed)

=== Season Three ===
(Dates are Melbourne air dates)

1. Marcus Clarke (7 January 1975 - Melbourne) - by Kerry Wanka directed by John Croyston
2. Percy Grainger (14 Jan 1975) - by Cole Thompson, directed by Alan Burke. NB was to have shown previous year but withdrawn for Nixon's resignation
3. Sidney Kidman (21 Jan 1975)
4. Walter Burley Griffin (28 Jan 1975)
5. George Coppin (4 Feb 1975) - by Joe James directed by John Croyston
6. Eddie Gilbert (11 Feb 1975) - was to have shown previous year but withdrawn to show a political program
7. Henry Handel Richardson (18 Feb 1975)
8. S. T. Gill (25 February 1975) - by John Croyston, directed by Alan Burke
9. Matthew Flinders (4 March 1975)
10. Annette Kellerman (11 March 1975) by Cole Thompson, directed by Bruce Best
11. Christopher Brennan (18 March 1975)
12. Tom Roberts (20 March 1975) - written by Joe James directed by John Matthews
13. Ann Rumsby (27 March 1975)
14. C. J. Dennis (8 Apr 1975) - written by Alan Burke, directed by Julian Pringle (final)
