= Shane Connor =

Australian actor (born 1959)

- Born: 3 April 1959 (age 67); Adelaide, South Australia, Australia
- Other name: Shane Feeney-Connor
- Education: Victorian College of the Arts at University of Melbourne
- Occupation: Actor
- Years active: 1981–present
- Known for: Neighbours as Joe Scully
- Spouse(s): Karen Connor (m. 1987; div. 1992) Nell Feeney (m. 1994; div. 1997)
- Children: 3

Shane Connor (born 3 April 1959) also billed/credited as Shane Feeney-Connor, is an Australian actor, who has had extensive experience in stage, television and film productions, both locally and internationally in the United Kingdom and United States. He is probably best known for his role in TV serial Neighbours as patriarch Joe Scully.

== Early life ==
Connor was born in Woodville, South Australia in April 1959 and graduated from University of Melbourne drama division the Victorian College of the Arts in the early 1980s. He worked steadily in film, theatre and television for many years.

== Career ==
Connor's television credits include the Channel Seven series Fire, the Australian Broadcasting Corporation drama Heartland, the miniseries The Harp in the South and Poor Man's Orange and Halifax f.p. (1998). He appeared in the USA television network miniseries Moby Dick as Flask.

Connor also played guest roles in Australian soap operas: He played Kevin, husband of Cheryll (Lisa Aldenhoven), in the women's prison drama serial Prisoner. Then in 1986 he returned to the series in the recurring role of biker Bongo Connors, the brother of Glenda Linscott's character, Rita Connors. He later appeared in its re-imagined series Wentworth on Foxtel. playing the partner of Leah Purcell's updated version of the very same character. Connor had a brief role as another biker, Angel, in another soap opera Sons and Daughters, in 1986.

Awards include the 1984 Penguin Award for Best Actor and the 1995 Green Room Award for Outstanding Fringe Performer. He also received a nomination for the 1998 AFI Award for Best Actor in a Leading Role in a Television Drama (for Halifax f.p.).

=== Neighbours ===
In July 1999, Connor joined the cast of Neighbours and began filming the ongoing role Joe Scully of builder and family patriarch, with his first scene's going on air in October. The show's producers invited him to audition for the role, and he decided to accept when he found out that he would be working with actress Janet Andrewartha, who plays Joe's on-screen wife Lyn Scully. Connor had previously played a guest role in the series as character Phil Hoffman debuting on-screen on 26 March and appearing until 16 April 1991. Joe Scully gave Connor the chance to play a character who was not a "bad guy, a confrontational type, a man on the verge". Connor was initially contracted with Neighbours for three years, with 12-month renewal options.

Connor was fired from the series in September 2003, several months after receiving a written warning from producers and overcoming an amphetamine habit. There had been ongoing hostility between him and Andrewartha; who had been the source of the vast majority of complaints about him. He sued the show's producer, Grundy Television, for wrongful termination of his contract, seeking about $200,000.

The court hearing heard that he had an amphetamine drug habit while performing on the show. Connor's older brother died in June 2001 and he had been badly affected by this, leading to the drug habit. Members of the cast and crew had complained about his behaviour at work. This included alleged aggressive behaviour and lateness that delayed production. After being confronted about his problem, he met with the cast in May 2003 and admitted the problem and apologised. Connor won the case and was awarded by the Supreme Court of Victoria over $230,000 in libel damages.

=== After Neighbours ===
Connor worked in the United Kingdom in pantomime. He also appeared as a guest in reality TV show The Salon and Killing Time.

Connor later guested in Nine Network's House Husbands. He joined the cast of Wentworth in a recurring role in 2018, followed by a recurring role in 2022 miniseries The Twelve.

== Personal life ==
Connor was married to his first wife Karen from 1987 to 1992.

Connor married fellow actor Nell Feeney in July 1994. They met when he guested in TV series Phoenix, in which Feeney was starring. Feeney gave birth to their twins, a son and a daughter, in 1995. They couple divorced in 1997.

Connor also has another daughter.

== Filmography ==
=== Film ===
Title	Year	Role	Type
1984	Street Hero	Yokel's Mate	Feature film
1984	Every Move She Makes	Tony	TV movie
1985	Rooted		TV movie
1985	Emerging	McNair	TV movie
1986	Army Wives	Grant	TV movie
1988	Tender Hooks	Wayne	Feature film
1988	Breaking Loose: Summer City II	Sampson	Film
1989	Action Replay		Film
1995	Rainbow's End	Detective Sergeant George O'Brien	TV movie
2008	Playing for Charlie	Joe Ruddock	
2013	Wolf Creek 2	Senior Sergeant Gary Bulmer Jnr.	Feature film
2013	Man	Sam Flanagan	Short film
2013	Touch	Carl	Feature film
2016	The Manny	Dad	TV movie
2021	OMG Dad		Short film

=== Television ===
Title	Year	Role	Type
1981	Cop Shop	Gardener No. 1	TV series, season 1, episode 339
1983; 1984	Carson's Law	Clerk / Joe / Gil Bishop / Albert Rudge	TV series, 6 episodes
1983; 1984; 1986	Prisoner	Kevin Armstrong / Maintenance Squad Man / Brian 'Bongo' Connors	TV series, 16 episodes
1987	The Harp in the South	Charlie Rothe	TV miniseries, 3 episodes
1987	Poor Man's Orange	Charlie Rothe	TV miniseries, 2 episodes
1987	Sons and Daughters	Angel Jones	TV series, 5 episodes
1987; 1991	The Flying Doctors	Rick/Ross Becher	TV series, 2 episodes
1984; 1989; 1991	A Country Practice	Peter Neal / Barry Hamilton / Colin Scott	TV series, 6 episodes
1991	Neighbours	Phil Hoffman	TV series, 5 episodes
1992	Phoenix	Manny	TV series, season 1, episode 7: "Old Rules, New Games"
1992	Police Rescue	Geoff	TV series, season 3, episode 13: "Heartbeat"
1994	Heartland	Ben Lovell	TV miniseries, 3 episodes
1993–1994	Law of the Land	Harry Miles	TV series, 26 episodes
1994	Sky Trackers	Sergeant Blake	TV series, 2 episodes
1995	Fire	David 'Giraffe' Simpson	TV series, 13 episodes
1995	Snowy River: The McGregor Saga	Tyler Morgan	TV series, 2 episodes
1996	The Bite	Thompson	TV miniseries
1997	Good Guys, Bad Guys	Bianco	TV series, 2 episodes
1997	Halifax f.p.	Ray	TV series, season 3, episode 3: "Afraid of the Dark"
1998	Raw FM	Digger	TV series, season 1, episode 13: "One"
1998	Blue Heelers	Danny Hobson	TV series, 2 episodes
1998	Moby Dick	Mr. Flask	TV miniseries, 2 episodes
1998	Wildside	Terry Young	TV series, 2 episodes
1999	Stingers	Terry Collis	TV series, 2 episodes
1999–2004	Neighbours	Joe Scully	TV series, 392 episodes
2004	The Salon	Himself	TV series
2005	Twisted Tales	Ben Kettle	TV series, season 1, episode 10: "Cursed House"
2008	Mark Loves Sharon	Roy Wary	TV series, 2 episodes
2009	Dirt Game	Max Mees	TV miniseries, 6 episodes
2009–2010	Satisfaction	Karl	TV series, 6 episodes
2007; 2011	City Homicide	Gareth Nunn / Philip Carter	TV series, 2 episodes
2011	Killing Time	Detective Sergeant Wayne Strawhorn	TV miniseries, 4 episodes
2015	House Husbands	Farmer Todd	TV series, 2 episodes
2018–2019	Wentworth	Ray Houser	TV series, 6 episodes
2022	The Twelve	Steve Dokic	TV series, 5 episodes

=== Theatre ===
Title	Year	Role	Type
1985	The Doll Trilogy	Johnny Dowd	Melbourne Athenaeum with MTC, Sydney Opera House with STC
1988	Backbeat	Dan / Terry / Stan	Stables Theatre, Sydney with Griffin Theatre Company
1988	And The Big Men Fly	Achilles Jones	Russell Street Theatre with MTC
1989	Kid Stakes	Roo	Playhouse, Newcastle, with Hunter Valley Theatre Company
1989–90	Byzantine Flowers	Eddie	STC
1990	This Old Man Comes Rolling Home	George	Russell Street Theatre with MTC
1991	Summer of the Seventeenth Doll	Featured	Seymour Centre, Sydney
1992	Coast Mongrels	Paulor	Playhouse, Newcastle with Hunter Valley Theatre Company
1995	Nil, Cat & Buried	Cat	Carlton Courthouse with La Mama, Melbourne
1995	The Snake Pit		La Mama, Melbourne
1996	The Shifting Heart	Clarry	Playhouse, Adelaide with STCSA
1997	Gary's House	Gary	Playbox Theatre, Melbourne
1999	Wonderful Ward		Melbourne International Comedy Festival
2004	Anyone for Breakfast	Gilbert	UK tour
2012	The New Black	Rupert	Arts Centre Melbourne
	Fool for Love	Eddie	Canberra Theatre
	The Harp in the South	Various roles	STC
	The Custodians		

== Awards ==
Year	Work	Award	Category	Result
1984	Shane Connor	Penguin Award	Best Actor	Won
1987	Army Wives	AFI Award	Best Performance by an Actor in a Telefeature	Nominated
1988	Poor Man's Orange	AACTA Awards	Best Performance by an Actor in a Miniseries	Nominated
1995	Shane Connor	Green Room Award	Outstanding Fringe Performer	Won
1998	Halifax f.p.	AFI Award	Showtime Award for Best Actor in a Leading Role in a Television Drama	Nominated
1998	Afraid of the Dark	AFI Award	Best Performance by an Actor in a Leading Role in a Television Drama	Nominated
