= Vietnam (miniseries) =

1987 Australian TV series

- Genre: mini-series
- Written by: Chris Noonan; Terry Hayes; John Duigan
- Directed by: Chris Noonan; John Duigan
- Starring: Barry Otto; Nicole Kidman; Nicholas Eadie
- Composer: William Motzing
- Country of origin: Australia
- Original languages: English; Vietnamese
- No. of episodes: 10

Production
- Producers: Terry Hayes; George Miller; Doug Mitchell
- Running time: 437 minutes
- Budget: $7 million

Original release
- Network: Network Ten
- Release: 22 February – 6 March 1987

Vietnam is a 1987 Australian TV mini-series directed by Chris Noonan and John Duigan. It stars Barry Otto, Nicole Kidman and Nicholas Eadie. The series won the Logie Award for Most Popular Single Telemovie or Miniseries.

== Plot ==
Set in the 1960s through to the early 1970s, Vietnam is a mini-series about Australia's involvement in the Vietnam war. The Goddard family live in Canberra – Public servant Douglas, Evelyn (Veronica Lang), and their son Phil and daughter Megan. Aged 15, Megan is now a rebellious teenager, infuriating her conservative parents while her older sibling Phil is a budding photographer.

Australia joins the war in Vietnam and the strains and stresses it places on the Goddard family mirror the political and social upheavals the country experiences in the 1960s. Phil is called up in the national draft and he reluctantly goes to do his duty with Australian army forces in Vietnam. He encounters the harsh realities of the war when the platoon walks into a minefield in a rice paddy, losing several men including Phil's friend Ritchie. Phil is horrified as his unit is ordered to assist South Vietnamese forces to evacuate and destroy a peasant village forcibly. Phil and his best mate Laurie become romantically involved with Vietnamese sisters Lien and Le. Back home, Douglas' workaholic lifestyle is straining his marriage and both parents are growing distant from their increasingly headstrong daughter Megan. The latter begins a relationship with an older boy Serge and she has to, at first, pretend to be a fellow university student to become involved with him. Serge goes away to University in Sydney and Megan later runs away from home to join him. Phil comes home on leave but the traumatic experiences of the war weigh heavily on him and he can no longer adjust to normal life.

Phil and Laurie return to the war which is growing ever more bloodier and cruel. Le is gang-raped by a platoon of US soldiers who have been brutalized by their experiences of combat. One American soldier is left behind to execute Le but he cannot bring himself to do it, instead, he cuts off one of her ears and fires a shot into the dirt, in order to convince his comrades that he had killed her and taken a 'souvenir'. Outraged by the sufferings of her people, Lien joins the Viet Cong. During the Tet Offensive, her group ambushes an Australian truck, wiping out the occupants including Laurie who is left permanently disabled by his injuries. Phil, increasingly disillusioned with the conduct of the war, joins a unit that specializes in unconventional warfare. After taking part in an ambush of a group of guerrillas Phil is horrified to discover that one of the dead is Lien. Unbalanced by his discovery he later endangers his fellow soldiers with a grenade during target practice and is thrown out of the unit as a result.

Back in Australia, the Goddard family begins to be torn apart. Douglas has become a key figure in the political decisions behind Australia's involvement in the war and he serves under all four prime-ministers who hold office during the Vietnam era, the demands of his job absorbing all of his time and energy. Fed up with the lack of attention from her husband and the unfulfilling existence as a housewife, Evelyn moves to Sydney. Megan goes to live with Serge and both become heavily involved with the antiwar movement. Evelyn later joins the movement, feeling happier in her newfound independence and she and Megan become close again. Serge is called up by the draft but he conscientiously objects, going to prison for his stance.

Phil returns to Australia for good, as does Laurie who is joined by Le who emigrates to become the latter's wife, doing her best to care for her disabled and traumatized husband. Phil grows more isolated, not even seeing his family and he becomes self-centered and bitter. He cannot understand nor accept the anti-war movement and free-wheeling youth culture he sees around him.

Megan has become a leading figure in the anti-war protests and whilst answering questions on a talk-back radio show, her confidence and self-righteous composure are shattered by a surprise call from Phil whose voice she recognizes. Phil's resentment and bitterness make Megan regret her movement's lack of support for returning soldiers. Le tells Phil about her rape and torture and why her sister joined the Viet Cong and he finally breaks down in tears, Le's story putting his own sufferings into perspective, jolting him out of his isolation. Douglas, Evelyn, and Megan have a reunion dinner and afterwards as they are saying goodbye to each other outside, Megan notices someone watching them from a nearby parked Holden ute. It is Phil. He says 'It's me.....sort of.'

The series concludes with Megan greeting Serge as he is released from prison and the two walk away arm-in-arm to face their future and adulthood together.

== Cast ==
=== Starring ===
- Barry Otto as Douglas Goddard
- Nicole Kidman as Megan Goddard
- Nicholas Eadie as Phil Goddard
- Veronica Lang as Evelyn Goddard
- John Polson as Serge
- Grace Parr as Le
- Mark Lee as Laurie Fellows
- Pauline Chan as Lien

=== Co-starring ===
- Alyssa-Jane Cook as Deb
- Celia De Burgh as Monica Montgomery
- Mercia Deane-Johns as Linda Aarons
- Brett Climo as Ritchie
- Jim Holt as Lieutenant Smart
- Cassandra Delaney as Melissa
- Noel Ferrier as Prime Minister Robert Menzies
- Henri Szeps as Prime Minister Harold Holt
- Alan Cassell as Prime Minister John Gorton
- Kevin Manser as Prime Minister William McMahon
- Leo 'Lucky' Grills as Senator Shane Paltridge
- Tim Robertson as Pascoe
- Vincent Ball as Dave the Spook
- Imogen Annesley as Annie Phelan
- Justin Monjo as Tenzy
- Alastair Duncan as Ambassador Anderson
- Virginia Hey as Journalist
- Craig Pearce as Corporal
- Kerry Walker as Dinner guest
- Kelly Dingwall as Serge's flatmate

== Production ==
The project was filmed in New South Wales, Australia, and for the month of June 1986 the Vietnam scenes were filmed in Phuket in Thailand. Kidman was 19 years old at the time, and Kennedy-Miller, the producers of the series, would later cast her in Dead Calm.

Vietnam features a host of high-caliber Australian television actors. Veronica Lang, Barry Otto, and Nicholas Eadie (aged 27 at the time) comprised the Goddard family, playing Megan's mother Evelyn, father Douglas and older brother Phil, respectively. Otto is a five-time nominated Australian Film Institute actor, who built up a solid body of work since his debut in the mid-1970s. Playing Evelyn is Veronica Lang, an English actress who was a familiar face on TV screens in England and Australia from 1965. She starred in Winners alongside Kidman in 1985, playing Alison Trig. Both Barry Otto and Veronica Lang also starred in the Aussie soap A Country Practice, in which Kidman also appeared. Playing the pivotal role of Phil, Megan's older brother who gets drafted into the army, is Nicholas Eadie.

== Reception ==
The first episode of Vietnam was broadcast in Australia on 23 February 1987, and received positive reviews from the Australian press. Reviews praised the show's accuracy in portraying society's changing attitudes towards the war, as well as the family dynamic and character development. "There is much to admire and little to criticize in Vietnam. Personal relationships inside and outside the family and the shift in society's attitudes have been penetratingly and evocatively observed. All the characters, including the South Vietnamese for once, have been given an empathetic point of view," wrote The Age on the day of the show's premiere. The paper added that "The direction elicits absolutely involving performances from a top-drawer cast who endow the piece with subtle flourishes and delightful finishing touches." In another review a few days later, the paper added – "Especially fine are Nicholas Eadie as Phil, beginning as a finely crafted ordinary bloke and ending as a man who has experienced too much, and Nicole Kidman as the little sister who grows up. It is their relationship, brother and sister, which holds the whole thing together."

== Awards ==
Year	Award	Category	Result
1988	TV Week Logie Awards	Most Popular Single Telemovie or Miniseries	Won
1988	TV Week Logie Awards	Most Popular Actor in a Single Drama or Miniseries (Nicholas Eadie)	Won
1988	TV Week Logie Awards	Most Popular Actress in a Single Drama or Miniseries (Nicole Kidman)	Won
1987	Australian Film Institute Awards	Best Performance by an Actor in a Miniseries (Nicholas Eadie)	Won
1987	Australian Film Institute Awards	Best Performance by an Actress in a Miniseries (Nicole Kidman)	Won

== Releases ==
Original broadcast: Channel 10, 23 February 1987 – 27 April 1987. Vietnam aired in the UK, July 6 – August 3 1988 – 5 x 90 minute episodes BBC1

=== Home video ===
- 1989 UK – PAL VHS
- 2009 Australia – PAL/Region 4 DVD
- Multi-region PAL/NTSC DVD (USA/Canada: Languages: English (Dolby Digital 2.0)
- Multi-region PAL/NTSC DVD English (Dolby Digital 5.1), English (Subtitles)
- Widescreen (1.78:1) 3 DVD

== See also ==
- Cinema of Australia
