= Lane End (TV series) =

- Written by: Barbara Vernon; Michael Boddy; Eleanor Witcombe
- Directed by: John Croyston; Julian Pringle
- Starring: John Meillon
- Country of origin: Australia
- Original language: English
- No. of episodes: 7

Production
- Producer: Alan Burke
- Running time: 30 mins

Original release
- Network: ABC
- Release: 11 April – 23 May 1972

Lane End is a 1972 Australian TV series. It is a follow-up to Bellbird, made by many of the same creative team. It is set in Paddington, New South Wales and told the continuing story of a group of characters who worked and lived there.

Regular characters included a Greek-Australian and his wife (Mr and Mrs Pappas) who ran the corner store; their daughter, Angela, who was a first year Arts student at University and battled with problems of conflict with her traditional parents; a man who owned a used-car lot (Ray Dunlop, played by John Meillon); a young man who was an accountant by day and a jazz pianist at night; and a nursing sister.

Set in Paddington, Sydney, but with a structure that facilitated movement around Sydney: Vernon said in an interview that 'The used-car man, Ray (played by John Meillon, and his wife (played by Carole Skinner) live in Woollahra, and his mother-in-law lives at Lindfield, which moves the characters around to different suburbs. The nurse was made a nurse so she could move around Paddington during the daytime, when office workers are at their desks. Among the other characters are city workers and young couples who earn their living in modern offices and escape at 5 p.m. to their Paddington terrace houses and Edwardiana.'

The Pappas family story of conflicting interests when the children reject their Greek way of life. (Canberra Times, 10 April 1972, p. 17)

The serial did not continue beyond the originally commissioned batch of seven half-hour episodes.

== Cast ==
- Margaret Christensen as Grandma Pappas
- Lyndall Barbour
- Ben Gabriel as Chris Pappas
- Carole Skinner as Peggy Dunlop
- John Meillon as Ray Dunlop, a car salesman
- Rosalba Verucci as Katrina Pappas
- Chard Hayward as Wentworth, Katrina's boyfriend
- Clare Balmford as Panine Potter
- Fred Betts as Bert Potter
- Lea Denfield as Dawn Pappas, Chris' wife
- Glyn Paul as Sam Pappas
- Olive Brown as Ruth Murray
- Alistair Duncan as Spyros
- Don Crosby as Sergeant Woods
- David Whitford as Constable

== Production ==
Barbaa Vernon, who had been the first story editor on Bellbird, was appointed first script editor. She said "We're trying to do everything in reverse to Bellbird. Lane End is a city based serial with all the problems of the city."

Michael Boddy and Eleanor Witcombe were announced as the main writers. However later on the writers were listed as John Martin, Brian Wright, Colin Thompson, Lance Peters and James Workman.

There were two directors, Julian Pringle and John Croyston.

== Episodes ==
1. 11 April - Katrina fails to return from a night baby sitting for the Dunlops
2. 18 April
3. 25 April - the Pappas family is annoyed at the attitude of the Dunlops to Katrina and ask advice of their solicitor, Spyros. Directed by Julian Pringle.
4. 2 May
5. 9 May - Grandma Pappas arranges a marriage for Katrina.
6. 16 May
7. 23 May

== Reception ==
The Age reviewing the first episode said the series "with its supense and polished acting... offers fresh proof that local teleplays are coming of age."

The Sun Herald thought the series was "loaded with promise" but it "seems an odd kind of thing to narrow down a serial which could go on and on forever to the problems of a Greek family battling the generation gap."
