= Fragments of War: The Story of Damien Parer =

- Written by: John Duigan
- Directed by: John Duigan
- Starring: Nicholas Eadie; Anne Tenney
- Country of origin: Australia
- Original language: English

Production
- Producers: Terry Hayes; Doug Mitchell; George Miller
- Cinematography: Yuri Sokol
- Running time: 101 mins
- Production company: Kennedy Miller Productions

Original release
- Network: Network 10
- Release: 19 October 1988

Fragments of War is a 1988 Australian TV movie about the war photographer Damien Parer.

== Cast ==
- Nicholas Eadie as Damien Parer
- Anne Tenney as Marie Parer
- Steve Jodrell as Chester Wilmott
- Jeff Truman as Osmar White
- Mark Hembrow as Padre
- Loene Carmen as Waitress
- Anna Hruby as Meg
- Rebekah Elmaloglou as Helena
- Miles Buchanan as Simpson
- David Wenham as Soldier
