= Terry Hayes =

Australian screenwriter, film producer, and journalist

- Hayes in 2024
- Born: 8 October 1951 (age 75); Sussex, England
- Occupations: Screenwriter; film producer; author
- Children: 4

Terry Hayes (born 8 October 1951) is an Australian screenwriter, film producer and author. He is best known for his work with Kennedy Miller production house, with whom he won the AACTA Award for Best Film twice, for The Year My Voice Broke (1987) and Flirting (1991).

== Biography ==
=== Early years and journalism ===
Hayes was born in Sussex, England and emigrated to Australia at the age of 5. He began his career as a journalist, working as the US correspondent for the Australian newspaper The Sydney Morning Herald. He spent periods as an investigative reporter, columnist and radio show host.

=== Kennedy Miller ===
Hayes met director George Miller when he did the novelisation of the script to Mad Max (1979). He and Miller got on well and the director subsequently hired Hayes to help on the script for Mad Max 2 (1981).

Hayes subsequently became an in-house writer for Kennedy Miller, working on the scripts for all their subsequent mini-series. Further work included a script for Dead Calm in 1989. He wrote Bangkok Hilton specifically as a vehicle for Nicole Kidman.

=== Hollywood and novelist ===
Hayes moved to Hollywood. His work includes an unused screenplay for Planet of the Apes, titled Return of the Apes in 1994.

In 2001, Hayes was nominated for the Bram Stoker Award for Best Screenplay for his work on From Hell.

Hayes' debut novel, I Am Pilgrim was published by Transworld Publishers on 18 July 2013. That same month, Metro-Goldwyn-Mayer acquired the film rights to the novel with Hayes attached to adapt it into a screenplay. His second novel entitled The Year of the Locust was planned for release in 2016, was finally released 9 November 2023.

In 2024, Hayes and British author Tammy Cohen were revealed as the writers of the tie-in novel to the film Argylle, under the pseudonym "Elly Conway". The book overleaf credits the (pseudonymous) author's full name as "Elizabeth Conway".

== Personal life ==
Hayes married in 1999 and has four children.

== Filmography ==
=== Film ===
Year	Title	Writer	Producer	Director	Notes
1981	Mad Max 2: The Road Warrior	Yes		George Miller	Co-wrote with Miller & Brian Hannant
1985	Mad Max Beyond Thunderdome	Yes	Yes	George Miller; George Ogilvie	Co-wrote with Miller, co-producer
1987	The Year My Voice Broke		Yes	John Duigan	
1989	Dead Calm	Yes	Yes	Phillip Noyce	
1991	Flirting		Yes	John Duigan	
1996	Mr. Reliable	Yes	Yes	Nadia Tass	Co-wrote with Don Catchlove
1999	Payback	Yes		Brian Helgeland	Co-wrote with Helgeland
2000	Vertical Limit	Yes		Martin Campbell	Co-wrote screenplay with Robert King, based on a story by Robert King
2001	From Hell	Yes		Albert Hughes; Allen Hughes	Co-wrote with Rafael Yglesias

==== Uncredited script revisions ====
Year	Title	Director	Notes
1993	Cliffhanger	Renny Harlin	
1994	The Crow	Alex Proyas	
2002	Reign of Fire	Rob Bowman	
2005	Flightplan	Robert Schwentke	

=== Television ===
Year	Title	Writer	Producer	Notes
1983	The Dismissal	Yes		Miniseries
1988	Fragments of War: The Story of Damien Parer		Yes	Television film
1988	The Clean Machine	Yes	Yes	Television film
1988	The Riddle of the Stinson		Yes	Television film
1984	Bodyline	Yes		Miniseries
1984	The Cowra Breakout		Yes	Miniseries
1987	Vietnam	Yes	Yes	Miniseries
1988	Dirtwater Dynasty	Yes	Yes	Miniseries
1989	Bangkok Hilton	Yes	Yes	Miniseries

== Novels ==
- I Am Pilgrim (2013)
- The Year of the Locust (2023)
- Argylle: A Novel (2024) – ISBN 978-0593600016 — writing as Elly Conway (writing team pseudonym), co-authored with Tammy Cohen. A tie-in novel to the Argylle media franchise.
