= Poor Man's Orange =

1949 novel by Ruth Park

- First edition (publ. Angus and Robertson)
- Author: Ruth Park
- Language: English
- Genre: Fiction
- Publisher: Angus & Robertson, Australia
- Publication date: 1949
- Publication place: Australia
- Media type: Print
- Pages: 276 pp
- ISBN: 0-312-00054-5
- Preceded by: The Harp in the South
- Followed by: Witch's Thorn

Poor Man's Orange is a novel by New Zealand born Australian author Ruth Park. Published in 1949, the book is the sequel to The Harp in the South (1948) and continues the story of the Darcy family, living in the Surry Hills area of Sydney.

== Television ==
Poor Man's Orange
- Australian DVD release
- Directed by: George Whaley
- Starring: Anne Phelan; Martyn Sanderson
- Country of origin: Australia
- Original language: English
- No. of episodes: 3 × 2 hours

Production
- Producer: Anthony Buckley
- Running time: 269 mins
- Budget: $4.2 million

Original release
- Release: 11 May 1987 – 1987

Like its predecessor The Harp in the South, Poor Man's Orange was also adapted for Australian television by the Ten Network in 1987.

=== Cast ===
- Anne Phelan as Mumma Darcy (Margaret)
- Martyn Sanderson as Hughie Darcy
- Anna Hruby as Roie (Rowena) Rothe
- Kaarin Fairfax as Dolour Darcy
- Gwen Plumb as Granny Kilker
- Shane Connor as Charlie Rothe
- Syd Conabere as Pat Diamond
- Ron Shand as Bumper Reilly
- Emily Nicol as Motty (Moira) Rothe
- Brandon Burke as Tommy Mendel
- Lois Ramsay as Mrs. Campion
- Cecil Parkee as Lick Jimmy
- Carole Skinner as Delie Stock
- Charles Tingwell as Father Cooley
- Brendan Han Tjahjadi as Roger Bubba
- Kerry Walker as Miss Moon

The Harp in the South and Poor Man's Orange have been released by Roadshow Entertainment as a 3-DVD package.
