= Army Wives (1987 film) =

- Based on: article by Lyndall Crisp
- Written by: Anne Brooksbank
- Directed by: Denny Lawrence
- Starring: Julie Nihill; Lian Lunson; Shane Connor; Philip Quast
- Music by: Chris Neal
- Country of origin: Australia
- Original language: English

Production
- Running time: 97 mins
- Production companies: Roadshow Coote & Carroll; Australian Film Commission
- Budget: $1.4 million

Original release
- Network: TEN
- Release: 1987

Army Wives is a 1987 Australian television film directed by Denny Lawrence and starring Julie Nihill, Lian Lunson, Shane Connor, and Philip Quast. The plot is about two friends who marry soldiers in the army.

== Cast ==
- Julie Nihill as Jill
- Lian Lunson as Wendy
- Shane Connor as Grant
- Philip Quast as Peter

== Production ==
The script was based on a series of articles in the National Times. Filming took place in June 1986.
