= Ralph Myers =

Australian theatre designer and director

Ralph Myers is an Australian theatre designer and director, and the former artistic director of Sydney's Belvoir.

In 2005 and 2006 Myers was the resident designer at the Sydney Theatre Company; he was later an associate artist at Belvoir. His appointment as artistic director at Belvoir was announced in 2009 and he replaced outgoing Artistic Director Neil Armfield at the beginning of 2011. Myers announced his intention to step down in June 2014, and departed at the end of 2015.

== Credits ==
He has directed Frankenstein for Sydney Theatre Company, and Private Lives and Peter Pan for Belvoir.

His design credits include

- Sweet Phoebe

Griffin Theatre Company

- Tango

Rock'n Roll Circus

- Inferno

Rock 'n Roll Circus

- Borderlines

Griffin Theatre Company/Riverina Theatre Company/Stable Theatre/Playhouse Wagga Wagga

- The 7 Stages of Grieving

Sydney Theatre Company

- Blue Heart

Siren Theatre Company

- The Cosmonaut’s Last Message to the Woman He Once Loved in the Former Soviet Union

Belvoir

- Knives in Hens

B Sharp

- The Soldier's Tale

Australian Chamber Orchestra/Bell Shakespeare

- Endgame

Sydney Theatre Company/Sydney Festival

- Frozen

Melbourne Theatre Company

- Wonderlands

HotHouse Theatre/Stables Theatre

- Conversations with the Dead

Belvoir

- The Fever

Belvoir

- Morph

Sydney Theatre Company

- Frozen

Melbourne Theatre Company production for Sydney Theatre Company

- Eora Crossing

Legs on the Wall/Sydney Festival

- Dinner

Melbourne Theatre Company

- The Spook

Belvoir

- Far Away

Sydney Theatre Company

- Cruel and Tender

Melbourne Theatre Company

- The Little Piggy

Sydney Theatre Company

- Ray's Tempest

Belvoir

- Boy Gets Girl

Sydney Theatre Company

- Dissident, Goes Without Saying

Blueprints for Sydney Theatre Company

- Mother Courage and Her Children

Sydney Theatre Company

- Lost Echo Parts I and II

Sydney Theatre Company

- A Kind of Alaska/Reunion

Sydney Theatre Company

- Parramatta Girls

Belvoir

- Enlightenment

Melbourne Theatre Company

- A Midsummer Night's Dream

Sydney Theatre Company

- Othello

Bell Shakespeare

- Toy Symphony

Belvoir

- Blackbird

Sydney Theatre Company

- La Boheme

New Zealand Opera

- Two Faced Bastard

Chunky Move

- A Street Car Named Desire

Sydney Theatre Company

- The City

Sydney Theatre Company

- Cosi Fan Tutte

Opera Australia

- Peter Grimes

Opera Australia

- Measure for Measure

Belvoir

- The Wild Duck

Belvoir

- The Seagull

Belvoir

- Summer of the Seventeenth Doll

Belvoir

- Caligula

English National Opera

- Death of a Salesman

Belvoir

- Hamlet

Belvoir

- The Government Inspector

Belvoir

- Is This Thing On?

Belvoir
