= The Evil Touch =

Television series

- Created by: Mende Brown
- Directed by: Mende Brown; Arthur Luddenham
- Starring: Mildred Natwick; Julie Harris; Leslie Nielsen; Darren McGavin; Vic Morrow; Ray Walston; Robert Lansing; Kim Hunter; Carol Lynley; Harry Guardino; Mark Lee
- Music by: Laurie Lewis
- Country of origin: Australia
- No. of episodes: 26

Production
- Executive producer: Everett Rosenthal
- Producer: Mende Brown
- Running time: 30 mins.
- Production companies: Amalgamated Pictures Australasia, in association with Olola Productions Australia

Original release
- Network: Nine Network
- Release: 19 June 1973 – 9 June 1974

The Evil Touch is an Australian television series, originally broadcast in Australia in 1973 and produced by Amalgamated Pictures Australasia in association with Olola Productions Australia. An anthology series, each episode had a self-contained story usually in a thriller or horror style, and often with a twist ending. Subjects explored included the occult, science fiction, murder schemes, and whodunits. Each episode had a new cast of guest actors playing new characters, although several guest stars appeared in more than one episode.

== Overview ==
The series was produced by American producer Mende Brown and partly funded by the Nine Network. A key feature was the involvement of internationally known actors. Some were lured to Australia to participate in the show by also being allowed to direct an episode. Supporting roles were portrayed by Australian actors. Despite Australian television being in black and white in 1973, this series was produced entirely in color and on film to enhance its international appeal.

Each episode was introduced by Anthony Quayle, who appeared in a darkened studio surrounded by unearthly golden smoke imagery, frequently reminding viewers that "there is a touch of evil in all of us". He returned to provide the epilogue to each instalment, always wishing viewers "pleasant dreams".

== Cast ==
Each episode featured a new setting and characters and a different cast. Several name actors appeared, acting in multiple episodes as different characters:

- Mildred Natwick (Heart to Heart and Scared to Death)
- Julie Harris (Happy New Year Aunt Carrie and The Upper Hand)
- Leslie Nielsen (The Obituary and The Voyage)
- Darren McGavin (A Game of Hearts, George and Gornak's Prism)
- Vic Morrow (Murder's for the Birds and The Fans)
- Ray Walston (Dear Beloved Monster and The Trial)
- Robert Lansing (The Lake and Seeing is Believing)
- Kim Hunter (Dr. McDermott's New Patient and Wings of Death)
- Carol Lynley (Death by Dreaming and Dear Cora, I'm Going to Kill You)
- Harry Guardino (The Homecoming and They)

Morrow and McGavin each directed one of the episodes they acted in. Australian actors in supporting roles included Jack Thompson, Elaine Lee, John Morris, June Thody, Tony Bonner, Neva Carr Glyn, Janet Kingsbury, Mirren Lee, Reg Evans, Peter Gwynne, Mark Lee, Carole Skinner, Briony Behets, Roger Ward, Rowena Wallace, Peter Sumner, John Meillon and Wendy Playfair.

Filmink magazine called it "pure Rick Dalton territory".

== Broadcasts ==
The series was initially screened in Australia by the Nine Network in a prime time slot. The series was also screened in first-run syndication and later re-ran on TV Land in the US and ITV in the UK, with later airings in the 1990s on Bravo. In Australia it was repeated in a late-night slot several times up until the mid-1980s.

== List of episodes with American airdates ==
- 1.The Lake (9/16/73)
- 2. Heart to Heart (9/23/73)
- 3.Dr. McDermitt's New Patients (9/30/73)
- 4.The Obituary (10/7/73)
- 5. Happy New Year, Aunt Carrie (10/14/73)
- 6.A Game of Hearts (10/21/73)
- 7.Seeing Is Believing (10/28/73)
- 8.The Upper Hand (11/4/73)
- 9.Murder's for the Birds (11/11/73)
- 10.Marci (11/18/73)
- 11. George (11/25/73)
- 12.Scared to Death (12/2/73)
- 13.The Homecoming (12/9/73)
- 14.Dear Beloved Monster (12/16/73)
- 15.Campaign '20 (1/13/74)
- 16.Faulkner's Choice (1/20/74)
- 17.Dear Cora, I'm Going to Kill You (1/27/74)
- 18.The Trial (2/3/74)
- 19.The Fans (2/10/74)
- 20.Kaidaitcha Country (2/24/74)
- 21. Gornak's Prism (3/3/74)
- 22.The Voyage (3/10/74)
- 23.Death by Dreaming (3/24/74)
- 24.Never Fool With a Gypsy Icon (3/31/74)
- 25.They (6/2/74)
- 26.Wings of Death (6/9/74)
