= I Am Pilgrim =

Book by Terry Hayes

- Cover by Richard Shailer/Transworld
- Author: Terry Hayes
- Cover artist: Richard Shailer
- Language: English
- Genre: Crime novel Thriller; Spy fiction
- Publisher: Corgi Books
- Publication date: July 2013
- Pages: 891
- ISBN: 978-0593064948

I Am Pilgrim is the debut novel by former journalist and screenwriter Terry Hayes. It was published on 18 July 2013 in the United Kingdom.

== Synopsis ==
"Pilgrim" is an American former intelligence agent known as the "Rider of the Blue" who later writes a book on forensic pathology. Pilgrim becomes involved in a case in New York City where a mysterious woman uses his book to commit untraceable murders in the aftermath of 9/11. The "Saracen" is a Saudi who becomes radicalised by watching his father's beheading. He later trains as a doctor and fights in the Soviet–Afghan War. Pilgrim is recalled to the intelligence community who have detected a threat involving the Saracen, who has created a vaccine-resistant strain of the variola major virus.

== Awards and honours ==
- 2014 Specsavers National Book Awards "Thriller & Crime Novel of the Year"

== Film adaptation ==
In July 2014, MGM bought the movie rights for the book and are set to target a series of films, similar to the Bond franchise, with Matthew Vaughn directing. In April 2018, James Gray was set to direct. As of 2024, the film still remains in development hell, and Hayes later gave an interview on the state of the film, saying that the rights still remain with MGM.
