= Adrian Britnell =

Australian set designer

Adrian Britnell is an Australian set designer and artist.

His props and decorations have featured in such films as Razzle Dazzle: A Journey into Dance and Star Wars: Episode II – Attack of the Clones and his paintings are inspired by quirky pop culture, bold brush strokes, colour, texture and form.

Adrian's paintings have been displayed at such venues as Art Treasury, Bondi Beach, 2009.

He is a graduate of National Institute of Dramatic Art (NIDA)
