= Michael Gow =

Australian playwright and director (born 1955)

Michael Gow (born 14 February 1955) is an Australian playwright and director, notable for his 1986 play Away.

== Early life ==
Born in Sydney, Gow acted and directed with the Dramatic Society from 1973 to 1976 s a student at Sydney University. After graduation, Gow went on to act professionally with Nimrod, Thalia and Sydney Theatre Companies.

== Career ==
After Gow received notice as a playwright for The Kid in 1983, his play Away (first performed in 1986 by Sydney's Griffin Theatre Company) established him as a major Australian playwright. Away is the story of three Australian families who go on holiday "up the coast" for Christmas 1967 as a remedy to personal crises, whose story threads eventually interconnect. The families cross the class and social divides: one is in a smart hotel, another is at the local caravan park; another is in the throes of possible divorce. These factors are woven into a story of love and loss that allows a young boy and girl to taste first love and the pain of death while their parents cope, more or less, with the consequences. Away received multiple productions in Australia and internationally, and remains a landmark of Australian contemporary drama and the best of Gow's earlier work.

Other plays of the late 1980s and early 1990s include Europe, an intriguing work as a young man and a European actress of uncertain age meet in her dressing room, Furious and Sweet Phoebe.

Gow's writing for television includes the 1984 telemovie Crime of the Decade and a 1989 miniseries adaptation of Sumner Locke Elliott's Edens Lost for which he received an AFI Award for Best Screenplay in a Miniseries.

He was the artistic director at the Queensland Theatre Company from 1999 until 2010. Productions he directed for the company included Private Fears in Public Places, John Gabriel Borkman, Who's Afraid of Virginia Woolf? (2007); The Importance of Being Earnest, Heiner Müller's Anatomy Titus Fall of Rome: A Shakespeare Commentary, I Am My Own Wife, (2008); The School of Arts and The Crucible (2009).

Gow had not written a full-length play for ten years while fully engaged as artistic director of Queensland Theatre Company. In 2007, his play Toy Symphony received its world premiere production at Sydney's Belvoir St Theatre. It was a critical and popular success, starring Richard Roxburgh in his first stage role for some years. Toy Symphony is a further exploration of Gow's Shire roots and much else besides. Toy Symphony was awarded Best New Australian Work at the 2008 Helpmann Awards, and the production was also nominated for Best Play. The production also won four Sydney Theatre Awards including Best Mainstage Production.

Gow criticised the new HSC syllabus in 2017, which had a renewed emphasis on classic works.

== Works ==
- The Kid (1983)
- The Astronaut's Wife (1985)
- Away (1986)
- 17 (N/A)
- On Top of the World (1987)
- Europe (1987)
- 1841 (1988)
- All Stops Out (1989)
- Furious (1994)
- Sweet Phoebe (1994)
- Live Acts On Stage (1996)
- Up Here (2004)
- The Fortunes of Richard Mahony, adapted from the novel by Henry Handel Richardson (2004)
- Toy Symphony (2007)
- Once in Royal David's City (2014)
- Goldilocks (2019)
