= National Institute of Dramatic Art =

Australian performing arts institute

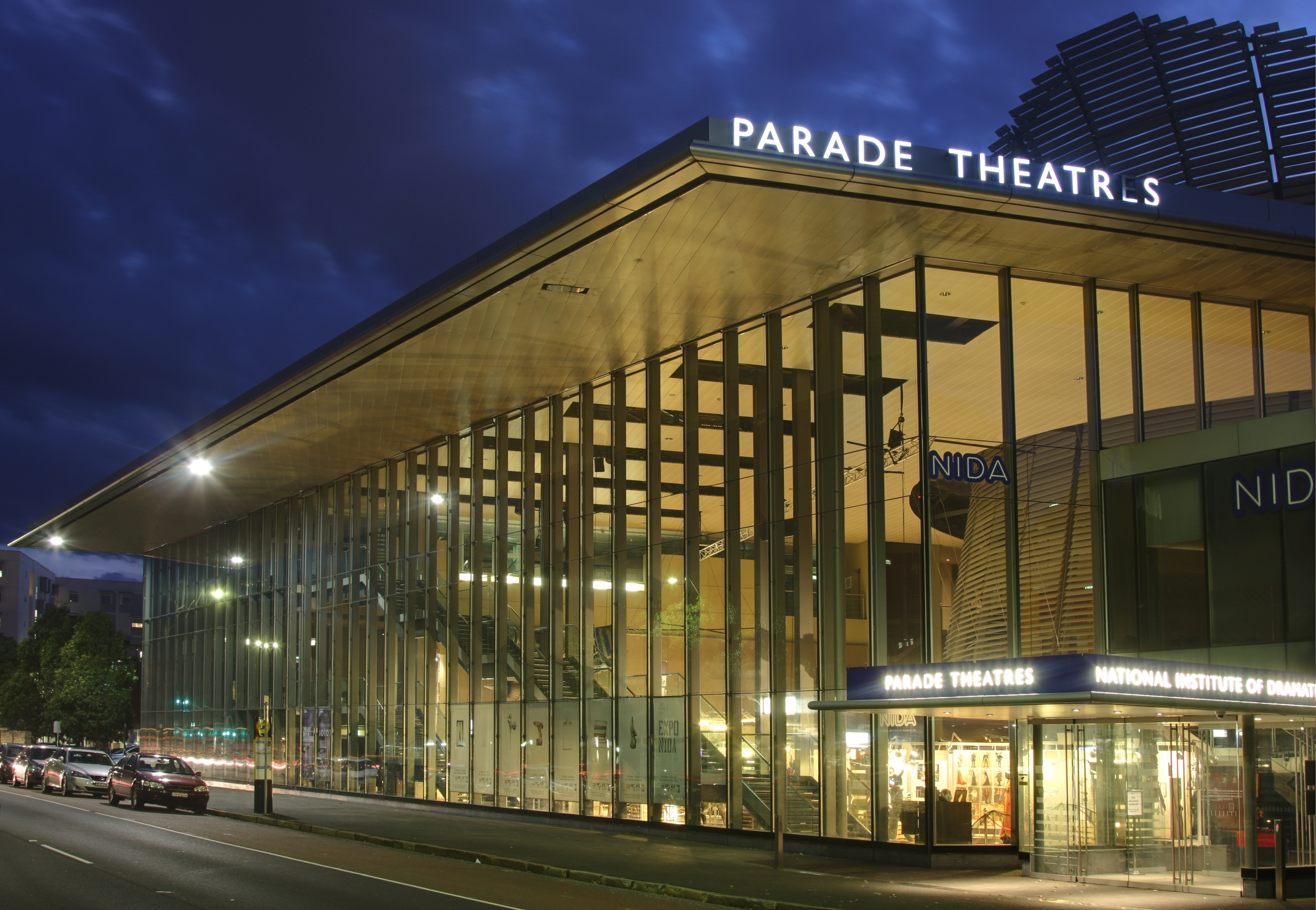
- Established: 1958; 68 years ago
- Location: Kensington, Sydney, New South Wales, Australia (Map); 33.9158°S 151.2252°E
- Campus: Urban
- Website: nida.edu.au

The National Institute of Dramatic Art (NIDA) is an Australian educational institution for the performing arts based in Sydney, New South Wales. Founded in 1958, it offers bachelor's, master's and vocational degrees in subjects including acting, writing, directing, scenic construction, technical theatre, voice, costume, props, production design and cultural leadership. In 2024, NIDA was named as #13 in the "World's 25 Best Drama Schools" by The Hollywood Reporter.

NIDA's main campus is based in the Sydney suburb of Kensington, located adjacent to the University of New South Wales (UNSW), and is made up of a range of rehearsal and performance venues. Its performance venues include the Parade Theatre (also the name of an earlier venue in NIDA's history); the Space; the Studio Theatre; and the Playhouse, while the Rodney Seaborn Library forms part of its library and the Reg Grundy Studio is a training and production facility for film and television. Many of Australia's leading actors and directors trained at NIDA, including Cate Blanchett, Toni Collette, Sarah Snook, Mel Gibson, Judy Davis and Baz Luhrmann.

== History ==
NIDA was founded in 1958 as the first professional theatre training school in Australia. The idea of a national theatre training school was initiated by the Australian Elizabethan Theatre Trust (AETT) in 1954. With the support of the Vice-Chancellor (later Sir) Philip Baxter, NIDA was established in the grounds of the University of New South Wales. Robert Quentin, later Professor of Drama at UNSW, was appointed the inaugural Director.

Teaching began in 1959 and in 1960, the first 23 students graduated with a Diploma in Acting. After 1961 it offered both acting and production streams, and in the early 1970s design, technical production and directing streams were introduced.

NIDA ran the Old Tote Theatre Company until 1969, whose productions were initially funded by the AETT and subsequently by the Australia Council for the Arts and the Government of New South Wales. In 1967 the Old Tote moved its administration to separate premises, to a building which still exists on the UNSW campus, then known as the Parade Theatre, and on 7 May 1969 gave its first performance at that venue, a production of Tom Stoppard's Rosencrantz and Guildenstern Are Dead.

The Director of NIDA from 1969 to 2004 was John Clark (30 October 1932 – 2 April 2026).

The present campus was first opened in 1987.

In 1991 NIDA expanded into the study of theatrical crafts – costume, properties, scenery and staging – and over the 2000s developed post-graduate courses in voice, movement studies, production management and playwriting.

Additional buildings opened in 2001, which were awarded the 2002 Sir John Sulman Medal for public architecture.

== Governance and funding ==
NIDA receives funding from the Australian Government through the Department of Communications and the Arts, and is a member of the "Australian Roundtable for Arts Training Excellence" (ARTS8), an initiative between the national performing arts training organisations and the federal government that provides training for emerging artists.

== Admission ==
Entry to NIDA's Bachelor of Fine Arts, Master of Fine Arts and Vocational courses is highly competitive with an admission rate of around 12% and even lower for some courses; with more than 1,500 applicants from around the country competing for an annual offering of approximately 185 places across the six undergraduate, five post-graduate and four vocational diploma disciplines.

NIDA's Bachelor of Fine Arts in Acting is particularly competitive, with approximately 1,000 applicants per year attempting to secure one of 24 spots in the program.

== Campus ==
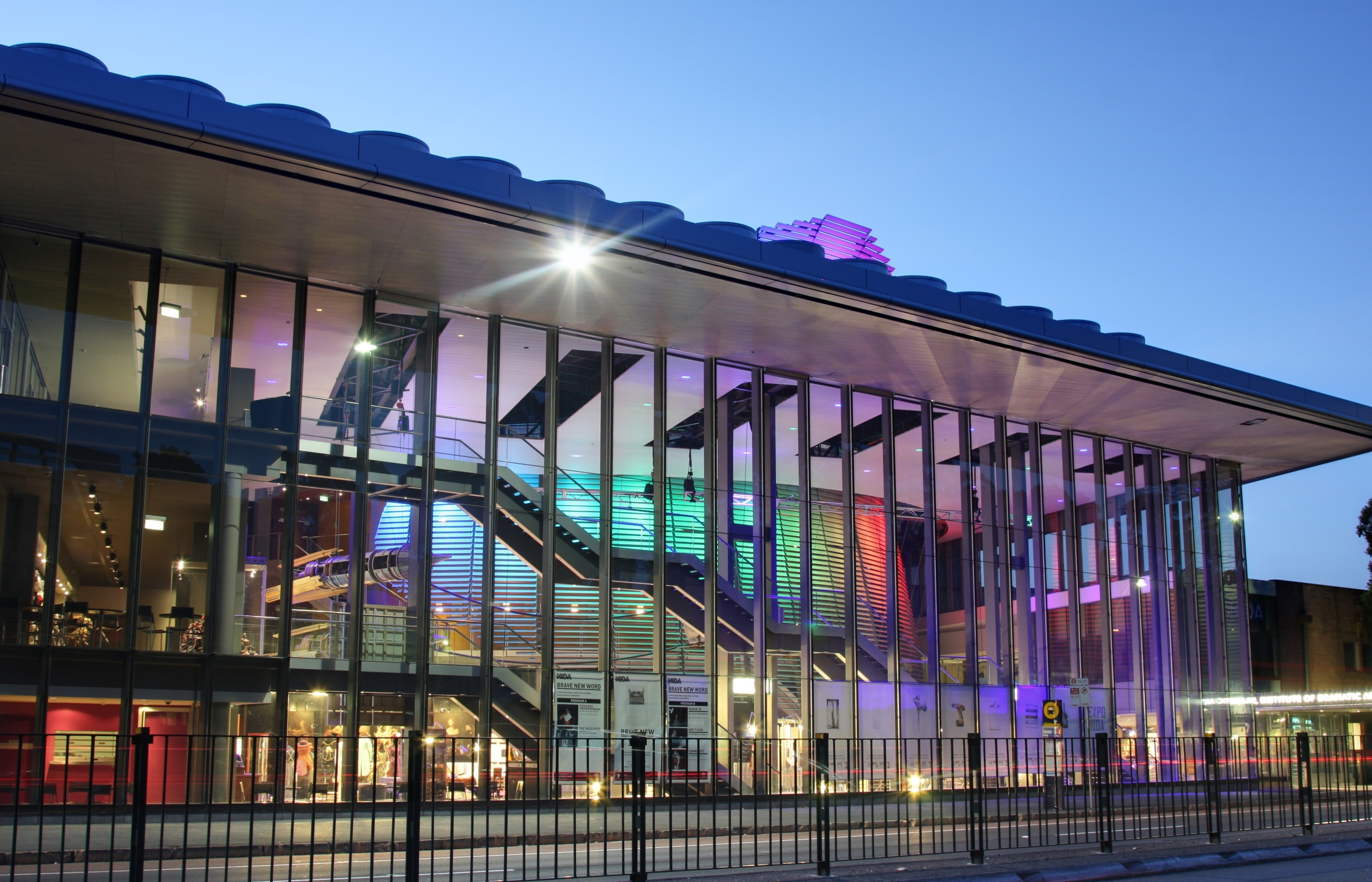
The National Institute of Dramatic Art complex at night

NIDA is located on Anzac Parade in the Sydney suburb of Kensington, across the road from the University of New South Wales.

=== Theatres ===
As of 2021 NIDA campus has six professional performance venues, in addition to studios and rehearsal rooms. The largest of these, the Parade Theatre, has three-tiered seating which accommodates up to 707 people. Other venues include the Playhouse, the Space, and the Studio Theatre.

=== Library and archives ===
The Rodney Seaborn Library, named in honour of arts philanthropist Rodney Seaborn AO OBE (1912–2008), is a specialist library for NIDA students, graduates and staff and is also open to the general public by appointment.

The NIDA Archives collects, organises and preserves archival records created by or relating to NIDA.

=== Other facilities ===
The NIDA campus includes rehearsal rooms, multi-media and computer-aided design (CAD) studios, a sound stage, a lighting studio, production workshops, audio-visual facilities, and the Reg Grundy Studio film and television training and production facility.

== Ranking ==
In 2018, NIDA was ranked as the 10th best drama school in the world by The Hollywood Reporter It is consistently ranked as the top school in Australia, or in the top five, by many sources. In 2021, it was reported as the 16th best drama school in the world by the same source, making it the only Australian drama school to make the list.

== Alumni ==
The National Institute of Dramatic Art (NIDA) is Australia's leading centre for education and training in the performing arts. A complete list of NIDA alumni can be found on the NIDA website.

Many of NIDA's prominent alumni were featured in a photo essay in the Sydney Morning Herald in celebration of the school's 60th anniversary in 2019.

Graduates from the National Institute of Dramatic Art include:

=== Acting ===
- Murray Bartlett
- Cate Blanchett AC
- Grant Bowler
- Tom Burlinson
- Nathin Butler
- Rob Collins
- Timothy Conigrave
- Ryan Corr
- Peter Dahlsen
- Essie Davis
- Judy Davis
- Andrea Demetriades
- Eamon Farren
- Lewis Fitz-Gerald
- Colin Friels
- Mel Gibson
- Harry Greenwood
- Yerin Ha
- Mia Healey
- Remy Hii
- Wendy Hughes
- Matthew Le Nevez
- Glenda Linscott
- Baz Luhrmann
- Jessica Marais
- Ingrid Mason
- Catherine McClements
- Garry McDonald AO
- Andrew McFarlane
- Jacqueline McKenzie
- Heather Mitchell
- Michelle Vergara Moore
- Toby Leonard Moore
- Robyn Nevin AM
- Matthew Newton
- Bojana Novakovic
- Zindzi Okenyo
- Miranda Otto
- Edmund Pegge
- Susie Porter
- Philip Quast
- Richard Roxburgh
- Alex Russell
- Toby Schmitz
- Shari Sebbens
- Hugh Sheridan
- Sarah Snook
- Rosalind Speirs
- Yael Stone
- Miranda Tapsell
- Anna Torv
- Hugo Weaving
- Sophie Wilde
- John Wood
- Sam Worthington
- Meyne Wyatt
- Gareth Yuen

=== Design ===
- Alice Babidge
- Kym Barrett
- Theodore Benton
- Adrian Britnell
- Fiona Crombie, 2019 Academy Award nominee for The Favourite
- Peter England
- Dale Ferguson
- Dane Laffrey
- Catherine Martin
- Ralph Myers, Former Artistic Director Belvoir St Theatre
- Jacob Nash, Head of Design for Bangarra Dance Theatre
- Deborah Riley, Emmy Award-winning production designer of Game of Thrones
- Angus Strathie
- Gypsy Taylor
- Daniel Tobin
- Gabriela Tylesova
- Michael Wilkinson, 2014 Academy Award Nominee for American Hustle

=== Directing ===
- Jessica Arthur
- Paul Curran
- Gale Edwards
- Sarah Giles
- Jennifer Kent
- Lee Lewis
- Greg McLean
- Jonathan Messer
- Tommy Murphy
- Moffatt Oxenbould
- Marion Potts
- Ryan Whitworth-Jones (First Nations Director)
- Kip Williams, artistic director of Sydney Theatre Company

=== Production ===
- Kuo Pao Kun
- Garry McQuinn, co-founder of RGM Productions
- Sally Riley, Head of Scripted Production for the Australian Broadcasting Company
- Jim Sharman, Director of The Rocky Horror Picture Show

=== Scenic construction ===
- Boaz Shemesh, Head of Set Construction for Sydney Theatre Company

=== Writing ===
- Jackie McKimmie
- Alana Valentine

=== Awards ===
NIDA alumni have won close to 1,000 awards including 8 Academy Awards, 9 Golden Globes, 10 Emmys, 48 Logies, 18 BAFTAs, 5 Oliviers, 5 Tonys and more.

Academy Awards

- Catherine Martin (Design, 1988): 2014 Winner Best Achievement in Costume Design The Great Gatsby; 2014 Winner Best Production Design, The Great Gatsby; 2002 Winner Best Art Direction-Set Decoration, Moulin Rouge!; 2002 winner Best Costume Design, Moulin Rouge!
- Cate Blanchett (Acting, 1992): 2014 Winner Best Performance by an Actress in a Leading Role, Blue Jasmine; 2005 Winner Best Performance by an Actress in a Supporting Role, The Aviator
- Mel Gibson (Acting, 1977): 1996 Winner Best Picture, Braveheart; 1996 Winner Best Director, Braveheart

BAFTA Awards

- Catherine Martin (Design, 1988): 2014 Winner Best Costume Design, The Great Gatsby; 2014 Best Production Design, The Great Gatsby; 1998 Winner Best Production Design, Romeo + Juliet; 1993 Winner Best Costume Design, Strictly Ballroom; 1993 Winner Best Production Design, Strictly Ballroom
- Cate Blanchett (Acting, 1992): 2018 Winner, Stanley Kubrick Britannia Award for Excellence in Film; 2014 Winner, Best Leading Actress, Blue Jasmine; 2005 Winner, Best Performance by an Actress in a Supporting Role, The Aviator; 1999 Winner, Best Performance by an Actress in a Leading Role, Elizabeth
- Baz Luhrmann (Acting, 1985): 1998 Winner Best Direction, Romeo + Juliet; 1998 Winner Best Adapted Screenplay, Romeo + Juliet
- Judy Davis (Acting, 1977): 1981 Winner Best Actress, My Brilliant Career; 1981 Winner Most Outstanding Newcomer to Leading Film Roles, My Brilliant Career
- Deborah Riley (Design, 1996): 2018 Winner Production Design, Game of Thrones
- Fiona Crombie (Design, 1998): 2019 Winner Best Production Design, The Favourite
- Craig Pearce (Acting, 1984): 1998 Winner Best Adapted Screenplay for Romeo + Juliet
- Angus Strathie (Design, 1988): 1993 Winner Best Costume Design, Strictly Ballroom

Golden Globe Awards

- Sarah Snook (Acting, 2008): 2024 Winner Best Actress in a Television Series – Drama, Succession; 2022 Winner Best Supporting Actress – Series, Miniseries or Television Film, Succession
- Cate Blanchett (Acting, 1992): 2023 Winner Best Performance by an Actress in a Motion Picture - Drama, TÀR; 2014 Winner Best Performance by an Actress in a Motion Picture – Drama, Blue Jasmine; 2008 Winner Best Performance by an Actress in a Supporting Role in a Motion Picture, I’m Not There; 1999 Winner Best Performance by an Actress in a Motion Picture – Drama, Elizabeth
- Judy Davis (Acting, 1977): 2002 Winner Best Performance by an Actress in a Miniseries or a Motion Picture Made for Television, Life with Judy Garland: Me and My Shadows; 1992 Winner Best Performance by an Actress in A Mini-series or Motion Picture for TV, One Against the Wind'
- Mel Gibson (Acting, 1977): 1996 Winner Best Director – Motion Picture, Braveheart

Primetime Emmy Awards

- Sarah Snook (Acting, 2008): 2023 Winner Outstanding Lead Actress in a Drama Series, Succession for episode ‘Tailgate Party’
- Murray Bartlett (Acting, 1991): 2022 Winner Outstanding Supporting Actor in a Limited or Anthology Series or Movie, The White Lotus
- Deborah Riley (Design, 1996): 2018 Winner Outstanding Production Design for a Narrative Period or Fantasy Program (One Hour or More), Game of Thrones for episode ‘Dragonstone’; 2016 Winner Outstanding Production Design for a Narrative Period or Fantasy Program (One Hour or More), Game of Thrones for episodes 'Blood of My Blood’, ‘The Broken Man’ and ‘No One’; 2015 Winner Outstanding Production Design for a Narrative Period or Fantasy Program (One Hour or More), Game of Thrones For episodes: ‘High Sparrow’, ‘Unbowed’, ‘Unbent’, ‘Unbroken’ and ‘Hardhome’; 2014 Winner Outstanding Art Direction for a Contemporary or Fantasy Series (Single-Camera), Game of Thrones for episodes ‘The Laws of God and Men’ and ‘The Mountain and the Viper’
- Judy Davis (Acting, 1977): 2007 Winner Outstanding Supporting Actress in a Miniseries or Movie, The Starter Wife; 2001 Winner Outstanding Lead Actress in a Miniseries or a Movie, Life with Judy Garland: Me and My Shadows; 2001 Winner Outstanding Makeup – Miniseries, Movie, Special, Life with Judy Garland: Me and My Shadows; 1995 Winner Outstanding Supporting Actress in a Miniseries or a Special, Serving in Silence: The Margarethe Cammermeyer Story

== Learning by doing ==
Industry engagement and collaborative student learning are core part of NIDA courses. NIDA utilises a conservatoire model, where students learn by practical application through in-house productions and working with professional companies on short-term placements. In addition to classwork, students will work on multiple practical projects during their time at NIDA, ranging from full theatrical productions to short films. Depending on the program, students may also undertake interstate and international trips as part of the learning process.

== Short courses ==
NIDA delivers hundreds of short courses every year across Australia and internationally through NIDA Open and NIDA Corporate.

=== NIDA Open ===
NIDA Open is Australia's largest non-profit, performing arts short course program. In 2018, more than 15,000 students attended NIDA Open courses in Sydney, Melbourne, Brisbane, Adelaide, Perth, Canberra, Darwin and other locations. NIDA Open offers courses for children and young people from preschool through Grade 12, as well as adult courses, in acting, comedy, costumes, props, make-up, design, directing, filmmaking, musical theatre, physical theatre and movement, presenting, technical theatre, stage management, voice and writing.

=== NIDA Corporate ===
NIDA Corporate offers training in professional communication, presentation and leadership for individuals and businesses in the public and private sectors. Tutors include voice specialists, movement and body language practitioners, film and theatre directors, actors and television presenters. In 2018, more than 9,000 participants attended NIDA Corporate training.

== Controversy ==
In 2012, former NIDA board member and Liberal senator Chris Puplick, who had served on the board for three years, wrote an essay titled "Changing Times at NIDA" which was published in the October issue of the publication Platform Papers. In the essay, Puplick criticized the teaching standards of the school and its director and chief executive, Lynne Williams, stating that she has had no significant experience in theatre to head the school, and that her style was "Thatcherite".

Soon after Puplick's statements were reported, chairman of NIDA's board, Malcolm Long, and Lynne Williams replied back to the comments, with Long stating that Williams had the complete support of the board and described Puplick as "an apparently disaffected former board member." Williams defended herself stating her management style was not "Thatcherite". Long also mentioned that amongst Williams' supporters were Cate Blanchett and Ralph Myers. Supporting Puplick were actor, director and a graduate of the school Jeremy Sims, who had launched the essay, and Kevin Jackson, who had taught acting at the school for 27 years.

In June 2020, a letter from over 100 alumni, students and former staff was signed and sent to NIDA's chief executive Liz Hughes accusing the school for failing to support Indigenous, Black and other students of colors. The letter which was sent to Hughes via email accused the school of "systemic and institutionalised racism" and where students had felt that they were there simply to fulfill diversity quotas.
