= Sweet Phoebe =

Play by Michael Gow

Sweet Phoebe is an Australian play script by Michael Gow. The 1994 world premiere production starring Cate Blanchett was by Sydney Theatre Company under the artistic direction of Wayne Harrison. Other notable performances of the play include a 1995 stage production at the Croydon Warehouse also starring Cate Blanchett in her first stage performance in London.

== Plot ==
When pet dog Phoebe goes missing, the impact on her minders is devastating. As Helen and Frazer desperately search the city streets, they encounter the unexpected, and are irrevocably changed.

== Reception ==
Critical reception for the script has been mixed to positive, with the Dallas Morning News panning it as "lifeless".

=== Awards ===
- 1995 NSW Premier's Literary Award - Play Award
