= Furious (play) =

Play by Michael Gow

Furious is an Australian play script by Michael Gow, first performed in 1991. The play centers on family secrets, betrayal, and the exploration of the age of consent for homosexual males.

Of the play, The Sydney Morning Herald praised it saying "its intensity and energy, it was as if Gow had captured an emotional state and hurled it like a thunderbolt upon the stage for us all to see". In her book The Body in the Library, Leigh Dale comments that the play "stages a gothicized and problematical version of the trope of the liberation of the insane".
