= Away (play) =

1986 play by Michael Gow

- Author: Michael Gow
- Translator: Away
- Language: English
- Genre: Play
- Publisher: Currency Press
- Publication date: 1986
- Publication place: Australia
- Media type: Print (Paperback)
- ISBN: 978-0-86819-211-6

Away is a play written by Australian playwright Michael Gow. First performed by the Griffin Theatre Company in 1986, it tells the story of three internally conflicted families holidaying on the coast for Christmas, 1968.

Away has become one of the most widely produced Australian plays of all time and is part of the Higher School Certificate syllabi or general High School Curriculum in many states, including Western Australia, New South Wales, Queensland and Victoria.

With the play's conscious nods to Shakespeare (it opens with the school's production of A Midsummer Night's Dream and ends with King Lear). Gow emphasises the performativity of individual human responses to death, racism, class and relationships. Gow sees the play as largely autobiographical.

== Synopsis ==
To conclude the year, a high school stages a production of A Midsummer Night's Dream by William Shakespeare. The play is directed by Miss Latrobe, whose work is praised by the headmaster Roy. Among the performers are Tom and Meg, who form a polite friendship and show a mutual attraction to each other.

Backstage after the production, Tom's parents, Harry and Vic, give the show an enthusiastic reception, whereas Meg's parents, Gwen and Jim, react with indifference. The two families discuss their plans on going away for the holidays, although after his parents depart Tom is hurt when he overhears Gwen slandering his family's lack of wealth. Gwen also shows disdain towards Coral, Roy's aloof wife. Following the death of their son in the Vietnamese War, Coral suffers from severe bouts of depression and dementia which is revealed to be causing a great strain on her marriage to Roy.

Although staying in different accommodation, the three families eventually converge on the same location at the Gold Coast for their holiday. Jim, Gwen and Meg are staying at a caravan park, and on Christmas Day, Jim is upset that the box of Christmas presents for the family has been left at home. Although he tries to hastily change the subject, Meg deduces that Gwen left the box of presents at home on purpose and angrily confronts Gwen. Gwen retaliates, offended and hurt as she explains her logic, immediately departing to lie down. Privately, Jim shares a memory with Meg of when he saw Gwen recite Scarlett O'Hara's famous monologue from Gone with the Wind, and places emphasis on Gwen finding solace in the film and aligning her life with the quote.

Coral and Roy stay at a luxury holiday hotel, where Coral endeavours to interact with other guests, although she ends up alienating them. Away from dinner, she engages in a surreal conversation with housewife Leonie, who confesses her husband is cheating on her. She then encounters Rick, a young man who is on his honeymoon at the hotel. They begin to form a connection with Coral after he indulges her conversations about marriage and her son. Their connection turns to attraction on New Year's Eve, as they kiss at midnight. Roy discovers them and threatens Coral with electrotherapy to cure her perceived insanity.

Harry, Tom, and Vic set up camp next to their car and progress along the coast from beach to beach. While desperate to ensure a happy holiday for Tom, Harry and Vic cautiously emphasise their holiday is humble. Eventually, they travel to the beach where Jim, Gwen and Meg are staying. After Gwen has an outburst, she goes on a walk with Vic as Harry privately confesses to Jim that Tom has leukemia. The treatment has caused their family a great deal of pain and brought a new appreciation of life, although they are prepared to accept that this is their last holiday together. The encounter ends with plans to attend the campsite talent show later that evening.

Tom and Meg spend time together, with Tom disclosing that Coral has run away from the hotel and is now masquerading as an artist at the campsite. He awkwardly propositions Meg, revealing to her that he is aware he is dying and pleading with her to let him try having sex with her, before she gently lets him down and leaves. Later at the campsite talent show, Tom and Coral perform a symbolic piece about freedom resilience and letting go.

In the closing scene, at the start of the next school year, an excited Miss Latrobe introduces the students to Shakespeare's King Lear, before looking around the class to find someone to read the first lines*.

*In the original production, the first lines were delivered by Tom. Gow revised the ending to optionally have Tom noticeably absent, and implied to have died due to his illness.

== Productions ==
=== Original Australian production ===
Away was first performed by the Griffin Theatre Company on 7 January 1986 at the Stables Theatre, Sydney. The production was directed by Peter Kingston, designed by Robert Kemp with lighting design by Liz Allen. The cast included Christian Hodge, Angela Toohey, Benjamin Franklin, Geoff Morrell, Julie Godfrey, David Lynch, Andrea Moor, and Vanessa Downing.

=== 2005 National tour ===
In 2005, a national Australian tour commemorated the play's 20th anniversary. It was a co-production with Queensland Theatre Company and Griffin Theatre Company. Then Artistic Director of the Queensland Theatre Company, Michael Gow also directed the production which later embarked on a sold out national tour. Completing the creative team included Brett Collery as composer and sound designer, Robert Kemp as production designer, and Damien Cooper as lighting designer. The cast included Leon Cain, Sue Dwyer, Barbara Lowing, Joss McWilliam, Daniel Murphy, Francesca Savige, Richard Sydenham and Georgina Symes.

=== 2017 Malthouse and Sydney Theatre Company production ===
A new adaptation of the play was staged in 2017, co-commissioned by Sydney Theatre Company and Malthouse Theatre. This production was recorded for film by Australian National Theatre Live, and was broadcast on digital streaming platforms during the 2020 COVID-19 pandemic. The cast included Liam Nunan, Naomi Rukavina, Glenn Hazeldine, Wadih Dona, Julia Davis, Marco Chiappi, Heather Mitchell, and Natasha Herbert.

The production, directed by Malthouse Artistic Director Matthew Lutton received generally positive feedback. Cameron Woodhead of The Age awarded the play four and a half stars, stated the production was "magnificent on every level", praising acting, design and direction, with sentiments being echoed by Daily Review's Ben Neutze, who commended the production as "inventive, tightly-wound, warm, passionate, and compassionate rendering.

In less favourable reviews, the production was criticised as "flat" and "disconnected from the classic" in ArtsHub, and Limelight Magazine commenting that "some of that magic is missing and the tears stay away" although praising the production on "still resonat[ing] on many levels". The Australian Book Review delivered a two star review, with reviewer Ian Dickson critical of Lutton's direction and "incoherent muddle that was presenting itself on the Drama Theatre stage with bewilderment". Nevertheless, the production enjoyed immense popularity in both Melbourne and Sydney during its engagements.

Under Lutton's direction, creatives on this production included set and costume design by Dale Ferguson, lighting design by Paul Jackson, sound design by J. David Franzke and choreography by Stephanie Lake.

== Casts ==
Character	Original Australian Cast 1986	2005 Queensland Theatre Production 2005	Australian National Theatre – Live Cast 2017
Tom/Rick	Christian Hodge	Leon Cain	Liam Nunan
Meg/Leonie	Angela Toohey	Francesca Savige	Naomi Rukavina
Roy	Benjamin Franklin	Joss McWilliam	Glenn Hazeldine
Harry	Geoff Morrell	Danny Murphy	Wadih Dona
Vic	Julie Godfrey	Sue Dwyer	Julia Davis
Jim	David Lynch	Richard Sydenham	Marco Chiappi
Gwen	Andrea Moor	Barbara Lowing	Heather Mitchell
Coral	Vanessa Downing	Georgina Symes	Natasha Herbert

Additional characters include a quartet of campers, and several other minor characters with small lines. These roles are usually played by one of the eight cast members.

== Awards ==
- Winner of the 1986 New South Wales Premier's Literary Award

== Bibliography ==
- Beckett, Wendy. Michael Gow's Away (Glebe: Pascal Press, 1993)
- Bramwell, Murray. 'Dreamtime', Adelaide Review, No.46 January 1988 : pp. 21–22
- Gay, Penny. 'Michael Gow's Away: the Shakespeare connection', Reconnoitres: Essays in Australian Literature in Honour of G.A. Wilkes 1992 pp. 204–213,
- Gow, Michael (1986). Away. Sydney: Currency Press. ISBN 978-0-86819-211-6.
- Hough, David. 'Away off the Mark', The Bulletin 1992, Vol.114 No.5838, 22 September. pp. 82–83
- Mitchell, Heather. Brodies notes on Michael Gow's Away (Sydney: Pan, 1988)
- Payne, Pamela. 'Gow goes for less sentimentality, more power', Sydney Morning Herald 12 June 1992 : p16
- Radic, Leonard. The state of play: revolution in the Australian theatre since the 1960s, (Ringwood: Penguin, 1991)
- Webby, Elizabeth. 'Away', Modern Australian Plays 1990 pp. 54–64
- Beverly Baptist College 2012 "modern Australian plays 2012"
