= 1982 Australian Film Institute Awards =

Australian film awards ceremony in 1982

24th Australian Film Institute Awards
- Date: 27 October 1982
- Site: Capitol Theatre, Sydney, New South Wales

Highlights
- Best Film: Lonely Hearts
- Most awards: Mad Max 2 (5)
- Most nominations: Mad Max 2 (7)

The 24th Australian Film Institute Awards (generally known as the AFI Awards) were held at the Capitol Theatre in Sydney on 27 October 1982. Presented by the Australian Film Institute (AFI), the awards celebrated the best in Australian feature film, documentary and short film productions of 1982.

Thirty feature films were entered, then a record number. Lonely Hearts received the award for Best Film. Although Mad Max 2 received the most nominations and awards including for Best Achievement in Direction, it was not nominated for Best Film. Animator Eric Porter received the Raymond Longford Award for lifetime achievement.

== Winners and nominees ==
Winners are listed first and highlighted in boldface.

=== Feature film ===
Best Film	Best Achievement in Direction
**Lonely Hearts – John B. Murray**; Goodbye Paradise – Jane Scott; Monkey Grip – Patricia Lovell; We of the Never Never – Greg Tepper	**George Miller – Mad Max 2**; Carl Schultz – Goodbye Paradise; Paul Cox – Lonely Hearts; Michael Pattinson – Moving Out
Best Performance by an Actor in a Leading Role	Best Performance by an Actress in a Leading Role
**Ray Barrett – Goodbye Paradise**; Bill Kerr – Dusty; Norman Kaye – Lonely Hearts; Vince Colosimo – Moving Out	**Noni Hazlehurst – Monkey Grip**; Wendy Hughes – Lonely Hearts; Carol Kane – Norman Loves Rose; Angela Punch-McGregor – We of the Never Never
Best Performance by an Actor in a Supporting Role	Best Performance by an Actress in a Supporting Role
**Warren Mitchell – Norman Loves Rose**; John Bell – Far East; David Argue – Going Down; Gary McDonald – The Pirate Movie	**Kris McQuade – Fighting Back**; Alice Garner – Monkey Grip; Myra de Groot – Norman Loves Rose; Sandy Gore – Norman Loves Rose
Best Screenplay	Best Achievement in Cinematography
**Bob Ellis, Denny Lawrence – Goodbye Paradise**; Paul Cox, John Clarke – Lonely Hearts; Jan Sardi – Moving Out; Peter Schreck – We of the Never Never	**Gary Hansen – We of the Never Never**; Dean Semler – Mad Max 2; David Gribble – Monkey Grip; Keith Wagstaff – The Man from Snowy River
Best Achievement in Editing	Best Achievement in Sound
**David Stiven, Tim Wellburn, Michael Balson, Christopher Plowright, George Miller – Mad Max 2**; John Scott – Heatwave; David Huggett – Monkey Grip; Max Lemon – Next of Kin	**Roger Savage, Bruce Lamshed, Byron Kennedy, Lloyd Carrick, Marc van Buuren, Penn Robinson, Andrew Steuart – Mad Max 2**; Lloyd Carrick, Greg Bell, Peter Fenton – Heatwave; G. White, Martin Jeffs, Julian Ellingworth, Grant Stuart – Moving Out; Terry Rodman, Gary Wilkins, Bob Litt – The Man from Snowy River
Best Music Score	Best Achievement in Production Design
**Bruce Rowland – The Man from Snowy River**; Brian May – Mad Max 2; Phil Judd, William Miller, Dennis James, Mark Moffatt – Starstruck; Peter Best – We of the Never Never	**Graham Walker – Mad Max 2**; Logan Brewer – Squizzy Taylor; Brian Thomson – Starstruck; David Kopping – The Return of Captain Invincible
Best Achievement in Costume Design
**Norma Moriceau – Mad Max 2**; Luciana Arrighi, Terry Ryan – Starstruck; Aphrodite Kondos – The Pirate Movie; Camilla Rountree – We of the Never Never

=== Jury awards ===
Best Documentary Film	Best Short Fiction Film
**Angels of War – Andrew Pike, Hank Nelson, Gavan Daws (producer)**; Journey to the End of the Night – Peter Tammer (producer); Two Laws – Carolyn Strachan, Alessandro Cavadini (producer)	**A Most Attractive Man – Gillian Coote (producer)**; Greetings From Wollongong – Nina Saunders (producer); The Revenant – Nigel Abbott (producer); To Florinda – Australian Film and Television School (production company), Louise Meek (director)
Best Animated Film	Best Experimental Film
**Flank Breeder – Bruce Currie (producer)**; Dudu And The Line – Steve French (producer); The Great Wave – Tony Gooley (producer)	**The Bridge – Mark Foster (producer)**; Rendezvous – Norman Neeson (producer); Strange Residues – AFTS (production company), Alexander Proyas (director)
Special Award Cinematography	Jury Prize
**Louis Irving – Greetings From Wollongong**; Alexander Proyas – Strange Residues; David Knaus – The Revenant	**Journey to the End of the Night – Peter Tammer**
Raymond Longford Award
**Eric Porter**
