= Andrew Pike =

Australian film historian

Andrew Pike OAM
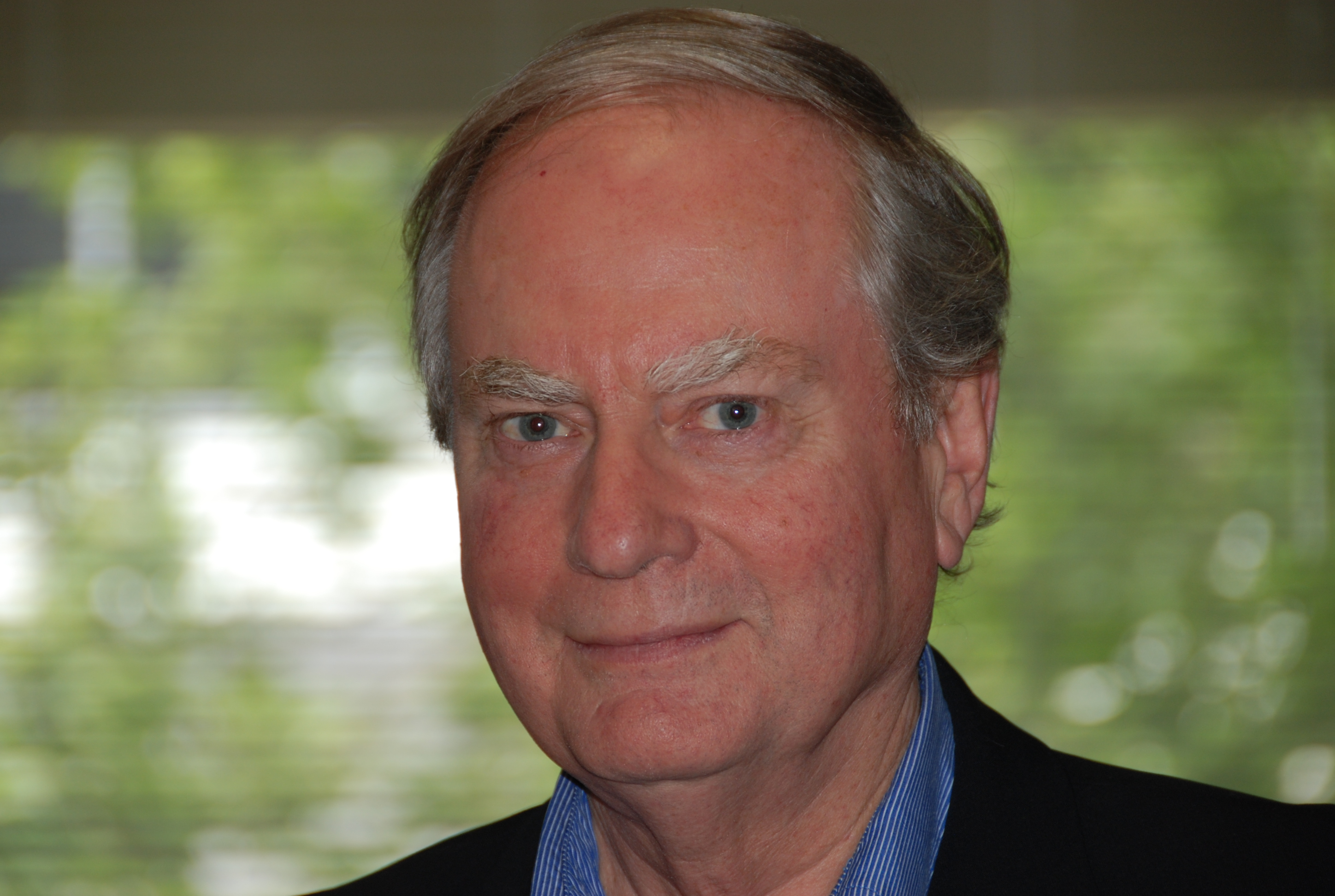
- Andrew Pike in 2009
- Born: Andrew Franklin Pike
- Occupations: Film historian, distributor, exhibitor, producer, and director
- Years active: 1970–
- Known for: Ronin Films
- Notable work: Australian Film 1900-1977

Andrew Franklin Pike is an Australian film historian, film distributor and exhibitor, and documentary producer and director. Pike formed Ronin Films, an Australian film distribution company, with his first wife, Merrilyn Fitzpatrick, in 1974, and remains managing director of the company. He has produced and directed many documentaries since 1982, and co-authored several books, notably Australian Film 1900-1977 (1998). Pike has been honoured with numerous awards, including a plaque on the ACT Honour Walk in Canberra City; Medal Order of Australia; and an honorary doctorate from the University of Canberra.

== Early life and education ==
Andrew Franklin Pike was born in Adelaide, South Australia.

He moved to Canberra to study at Australian National University (ANU). He started studying English and History, before joining the film group and graduating with B.A. (Hons) in 1969.

He then completed an M.A. (1973) on the history of Australian cinema at ANU.

== Career ==
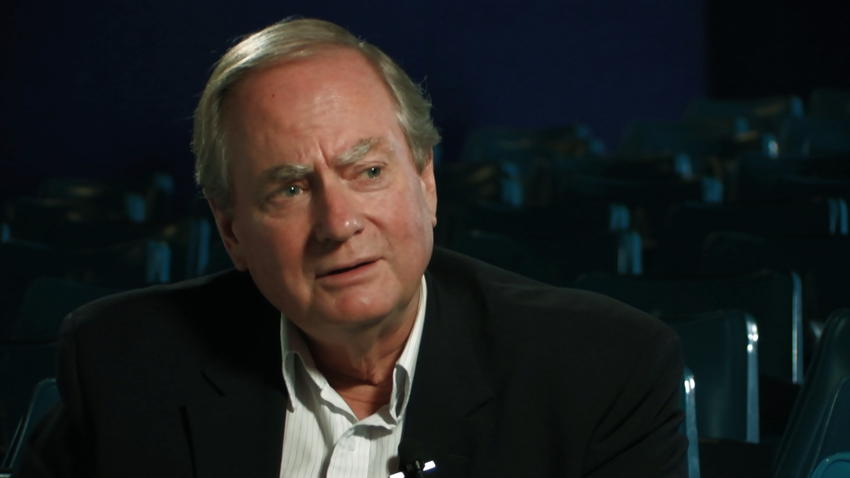
Andrew Pike at Electric Shadow Cinemas

Pike started working as a cinema manager. During this time, he wrote many articles on film, which were published in journals and newspapers, as well as conducting research for his first book.

He was then given the opportunity to work for three years as a consultant to the film collection of the National Library of Australia. This included the acquisition of films for study purposes in schools and universities.

His next position was as a research fellow in the Department of Pacific and South-East Asian History at ANU, where he worked for three years.

He was engaged as a consultant on regional cinemas by the New South Wales Film and Television Office and became active in promoting an expansion of audiences and a wider public appreciation of all aspects of cinema.

In 2017, Pike was appointed director of the Canberra International Film Festival.

=== Ronin Films and Electric Shadows ===
In 1974, Pike formed Ronin Films with Merrilyn Fitzpatrick (Pike). The Canberra-based company was involved in many innovative distribution and marketing activities. In its first two decades, the company imported to Australia 120 feature films from Europe and Asia, and distributed many Australian films, including the feature films Strictly Ballroom, Shine and Road to Nhill, which achieved national success.

The firm also developed an interest in films from China and Japan, importing many films from the Chinese "Fifth Generation" directors in the 1980s, and organising many Chinese directors to visit Australia, including Chen Kaige, Wu Tianming, Zhang Zeming, Huang Jianxin, and Tian Zhuangzhuang. The firm was actively involved in the beginnings of the French Film Festival in Sydney in the 1990s, and frequently worked with the Alliance française and the French Embassy to host festivals and other French film events at Ronin's cinemas.

As an exhibitor, the company ran several art cinemas including the Academy Cinema in Sydney for four years during the early 1990s, and Electric Shadows Cinemas in Canberra from 1979 to 2006. For many years Pike wrote programme notes for a weekly newsletter that was emailed to 4,500 cinema patrons in Canberra.

Ronin is a leading distributor of documentaries, and specialises in the educational market. Their collection includes many films from the CAAMA (Central Australian Aboriginal Media Association) collection.

== Other activities ==
=== NFSA ===
Pike has been associated with the National Film and Sound Archive (NFSA) in various ways since the 1970s. He was a member of its Advisory Council from 2000 until 2003, and later a member of its first governing board, from 2008 until 2012.

In 1999 Pike was instrumental to the founding of the Friends of the National Film and Sound Archive, an association dedicated to supporting NFSA's work and to promote the principles of best practice in the film archive profession. He was elected president of the association in 2004, was on the board from 2008 until 2012, and as of December 2024 is patron of the organisation.

=== Other roles ===
Between 1989 and 1992, Pike was a board member of the Australian Film Commission.

In 2000, he instigated forums on film culture at both the Sydney and Melbourne Film Festivals. In 2003 Pike was a founding member and secretary of the ACT Film and Television Council.

From 2008 to 2012, he was a member of the ACT Government's Cultural Council, advising the Arts Minister on arts policy and strategies. He also served as chairman of the ACT Screen Investment Fund for the ACT Government, and was a member of the ACT's Arts Advisory Council in 2013.

He chaired the MPA APSA film development fund for the Asia Pacific Screen Academy from 2010 to 2015.

Pike has a regular segment on Radio National talking about film history, and has a keen interest in policy issues affecting the film industry.

== Recognition and awards ==
- 1986: The Australian Film Institute's Byron Kennedy Award "for his unorthodox and comprehensive contribution to the film industry"
- 1993: Special award by the Film Critics Circle of Australia for contributions to the film industry
- 2003: Appointed by the French Government to the rank of Chevalier dans l'Ordre des Arts et des Lettres for his work in the distribution and exhibition of French cinema in Australia
- 2005: Plaque on the ACT Honour Walk in Canberra City in its inaugural year, for contributions to the city
- 2007: Medal of the Order of Australia (OAM), in the Australia Day honours list, "For service to the film industry, particularly through the promotion of Australian, independent and foreign films, and to the community"
- 2007: Honorary doctorate from the University of Canberra, for services to the film industry and to the community.
- 2013: Delivered the Theo Barker Memorial Lecture, hosted by the Bathurst District Historical Society and Charles Sturt University, on "Men and Women of the Bush in Early Australian Cinema"
- 2014: Co-winner, Promotion of Indigenous Recognition at the UNAA Media Peace Awards, with Ann McGrath, Ronin Films, for Message from Mungo

== Publications ==
Pike researched and co-authored (with Ross Cooper) the book Reference guide to Australian films 1906–1969, published by Oxford University Press in 1980, and Australian Film 1900-1977 in 1998.

The book [Australian Film 1900-1977] is a comprehensive guide to feature films made in the first eight decades of filmmaking in Australia. Entries include details of the production team and cast, a synopsis of the plot and descriptions of the shooting, marketing and critical reception. The book covers 488 films and includes more than 400 illustrations, many of them published for the first time. The book "remains the 'bible', the authoritative reference source on Australia's feature films...The passage of time has enhanced the value and validity of this now classic book, for its style is timeless, and factual accuracy does not date.

— Ray Edmondson, film archivist, Australian Film 1900-1977, Preface to the second edition

He also co-authored with Ray Edmondson, Australia's Lost Films: The loss and rescue of Australia's silent cinema (published 1982).

== Filmography ==
Angels of War (co-director with Hank Nelson and Gavan Daws) in 1982. The film was an award-winning documentary about the experiences of the people of Papua New Guinea in World War II. It was broadcast by ABC TV and won several awards including the Golden Sesterce for Best Documentary at the Nyon Film Festival (Switzerland) and Best Documentary in the Australian Film Institute's annual awards.

Man Without Pigs (co-producer with Chris Owen) in 1990. The film, directed by Chris Owen, offers insight into the dynamics of village life in Papua New Guinea and the antagonism aroused when conflict between traditional custom and Western values occurs in an isolated community. The film won the Best Documentary Award at the Hawaii Film Festival and was broadcast by SBS in Australia.

Oh, Beethoven! (producer) in 1999. The documentary follows Dr Susan West and the children from Ainslie Primary School, Canberra, in a special performance of a work about Beethoven's life. This is followed by discussion about West's innovative approach to music education.

Man of Strings (co-producer) in 1999. Directed by Gary Kildea, this documentary portrays the life and work of Czech-born violinist, Jan Sedivka, a leading violinist and string teacher in Australia.

Betelnut Bisnis (co-producer with Chris Owen) in 2006. This documentary, directed by Chris Owen, explores the life of a family in the Highlands of Papua New Guinea, who make a precarious living by trading in betelnut, one of the world's most widely used narcotics.

Across The Plateau (co-producer with his daughter, Harriet Pike) in 2007. This documentary, directed by Paul Liu and Zhang Zeming, is a bicycle story from China, about a group of friends in southern China who share cycling treks of epic scale.

The Chifleys of Busby Street (director) in 2008. This feature-length documentary, made with historian Robin McLachlan, is a portrait of Australian Prime Minister Ben Chifley, and his wife Elizabeth.

Electric Shadows: The Story of a Cinema (co-producer with Harriet Pike) in 2009. This documentary looks at the history of the Electric Shadows cinema, and considers its emergence as something of an icon in the Canberra cultural scene.

Emily in Japan (director) in 2009. This documentary explores the behind-the-scenes story of a major exhibition of paintings by the Indigenous artist Emily Kame Kngwarreye which toured Japan attracting record crowds. The film was broadcast by ABC TV.

Into the Shadows (consulting producer) in 2009. A feature-length documentary, directed by Andrew Scarano and Phil Hignett, about Australian cinema history, released nationally in cinemas by Ronin Films, and broadcast by ABC TV.

How To Run A School Concert (director and producer) in 2010. A short documentary telling the story behind a huge interactive concert for school children and the community, surveying international song through the ages.

Message from Mungo (co-directed with Ann McGrath) in 2014. This feature-length film explores the relationship between archeologists and Indigenous communities at Lake Mungo in the south-west of New South Wales, one of the world's richest archaeological sites. The film won a UNAA Media Award from the United Nations Association of Australia, and was invited to screen at many festivals.
