= Angels of War =

1982 documentary film

- DVD cover
- Directed by: Andrew Pike, Hank Nelson, Gavan Daws
- Written by: Andrew Pike, Hank Nelson, Gavan Daws
- Produced by: Andrew Pike, Hank Nelson, Gavan Daws
- Narrated by: John Waiko
- Cinematography: Dennis O'Rourke
- Edited by: Stewart Young
- Release date: 1982
- Running time: 54 minutes
- Country: Australia
- Languages: English, Japanese, Tok Pisin
- Budget: $80,000

Angels of War is a 1982 Australian documentary film, created by Andrew Pike, Hank Nelson and Gavan Daws, about the Fuzzy Wuzzy Angels in Papua New Guinea in World War 2.

== Production ==
Angels of War cost $80,000 with funding provided by the Australian National University and the Australian War Memorial.

== Reception ==
Neil Jillet of the Age says in his capsule review that it "is an interesting compilation of new (color) and archival (black and white) film, and a reminder of how soon we forget those who helped Australia to victory." In the Canberra Times Philip Castle finishes "This excellent film, being shown appropriately around Anzac Day, might in a significant way record the service of the Fuzz-Wuzzy Angels, lest we forget."

== Awards ==
- 1982 Australian Film Institute Awards
  - Best Documentary - Andrew Pike, Hank Nelson, Gavan Daws - won
