= List of awards and nominations received by George Miller =

George Miller awards
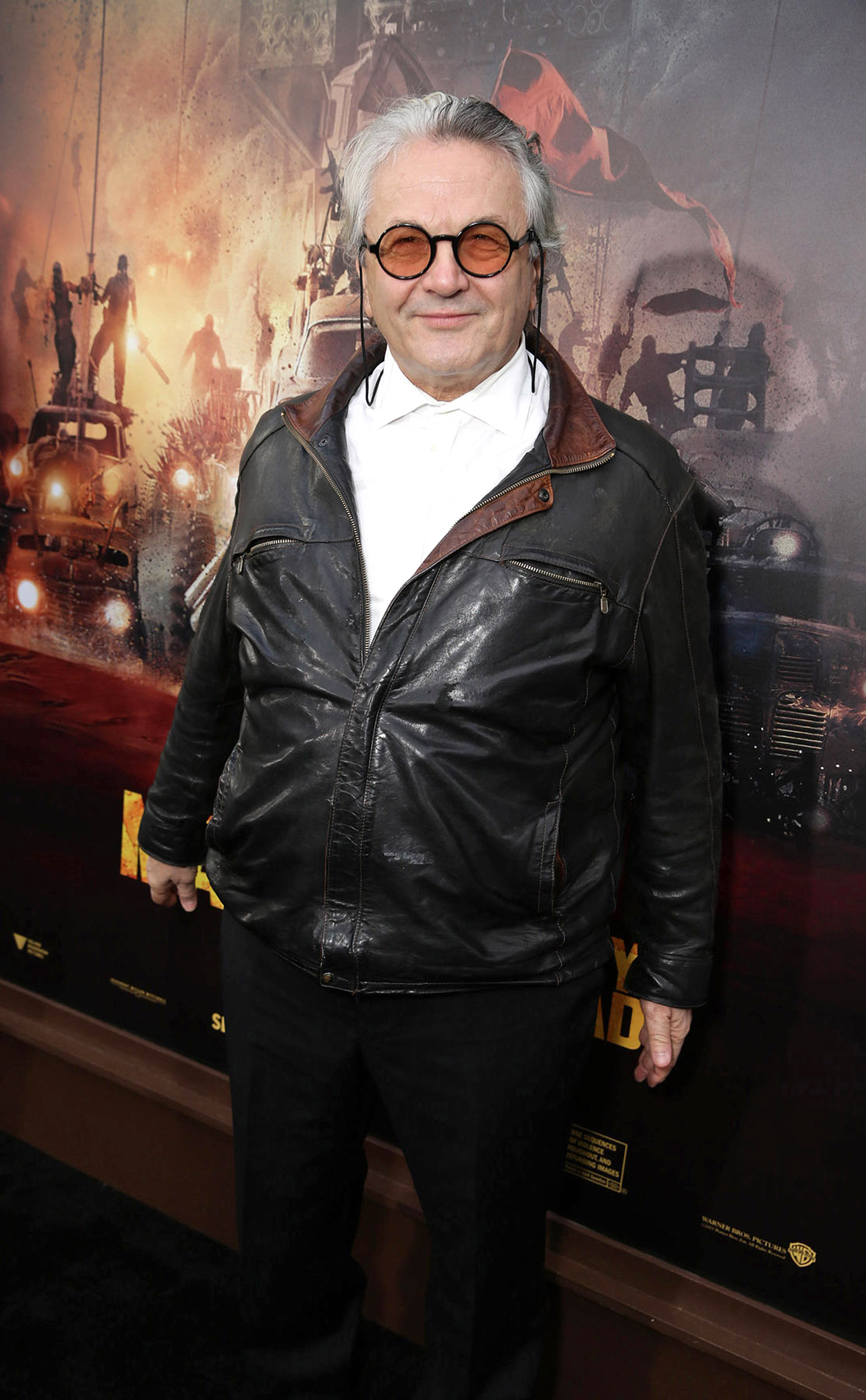
- Academy Awards
- BAFTA Awards
- Golden Globe Awards

The article is a List of awards and nominations received by George Miller, the Australian film director, screenwriter, producer, and former medical doctor. He has received numerous accolades including an Academy Award, a BAFTA Award, and a Golden Globe Award.

Miller has directed the action adventure films Mad Max (1979), Mad Max 2 (1981), Mad Max Beyond Thunderdome (1985), Mad Max: Fury Road (2015), and Furiosa: A Mad Max Saga (2024). He directed the horror comedy The Witches of Eastwick (1987), the drama Lorenzo's Oil (1992), the family films Babe (1995), and Babe: Pig in the City (1998) as well as the animated films Happy Feet (2006), and Happy Feet Two (2011).

== Major associations ==
=== Academy Awards ===
Year	Category	Nominated work	Result	Ref.
1993	Best Original Screenplay	Lorenzo's Oil	Nominated	
1996	Best Picture	Babe	Nominated	
1996	Best Adapted Screenplay	Babe	Nominated	
2007	Best Animated Feature	Happy Feet	Won	
2016	Best Picture	Mad Max: Fury Road	Nominated	
2016	Best Director	Mad Max: Fury Road	Nominated	

=== BAFTA Awards ===
British Academy Film Awards
Year	Category	Nominated work	Result	Ref.
1996	Best Film	Babe	Nominated	
1996	Best Adapted Screenplay	Babe	Nominated	
2007	Best Animated Film	Happy Feet	Won	

=== Golden Globe Awards ===
Year	Category	Nominated work	Result	Ref.
1996	Best Motion Picture – Musical or Comedy	Babe	Won	
2007	Best Animated Feature Film	Happy Feet	Nominated	
2016	Best Motion Picture – Drama	Mad Max: Fury Road	Nominated	
2016	Best Director	Mad Max: Fury Road	Nominated	

== Other awards and nominations ==
=== AACTA Awards ===
Year	Category	Nominated work	Result
1982	Best Direction	Mad Max 2	Won
1982	Best Editing	Mad Max 2	Won
1987	Best Film	The Year My Voice Broke	Won
1990	Best Film	Flirting	Won
2015	Best Film	Mad Max: Fury Road	Won
2015	Best Direction	Mad Max: Fury Road	Won
2015	Best Original Screenplay	Mad Max: Fury Road	Nominated
2025	Best Film	Furiosa: A Mad Max Saga	Nominated
2025	Best Direction in Film	Furiosa: A Mad Max Saga	Nominated
2025	Best Screenplay in Film	Furiosa: A Mad Max Saga	Nominated

=== Alliance of Women Film Journalists ===
Year	Category	Nominated work	Result
2016	Best Director	Mad Max: Fury Road	Nominated

=== Annie Award ===
Year	Category	Nominated work	Result
2007	Best Writing in an Animated Feature Production	Happy Feet	Nominated

=== Austin Film Critics Association ===
Year	Category	Nominated work	Result
2015	Best Director	Mad Max: Fury Road	Won
2025	Best Stunt Work	Furiosa: A Mad Max Saga	Nominated

=== Australian Film Institute Global Achievement Award ===
Year	Category	Nominated work	Result
2007	Global Achievement Award		Won

=== Boston Online Film Critics Association ===
Year	Category	Nominated work	Result
2015	Best Director	Mad Max: Fury Road	Won

=== Central Ohio Film Critics Association ===
Year	Category	Nominated work	Result
2016	Best Director	Mad Max: Fury Road	Nominated

=== Chicago Film Critics Association ===
Year	Category	Nominated work	Result
2015	Best Director	Mad Max: Fury Road	Won

=== Critics' Choice Movie Awards ===
Year	Category	Nominated work	Result
2016	Best Director	Mad Max: Fury Road	Won

=== Dallas–Fort Worth Film Critics Association ===
Year	Category	Nominated work	Result
2015	Best Director	Mad Max: Fury Road	Nominated

=== Denver Film Critics Society ===
Year	Category	Nominated work	Result
2016	Best Director	Mad Max: Fury Road	Won

=== Detroit Film Critics Society ===
Year	Nominated work	Category	Result
2015	Best Director	Mad Max: Fury Road	Won

=== Directors Guild of America Award ===
Year	Category	Nominated work	Result
2016	Outstanding Directorial Achievement in Feature Film	Mad Max: Fury Road	Nominated

=== Empire Award ===
Year	Category	Nominated work	Result
2016	Best Director	Mad Max: Fury Road	Nominated

=== FIAPF Award ===
Year	Category	Nominated work	Result
2007	FIAPF Award		Won

=== Florida Film Critics Circle ===
Year	Category	Nominated work	Result
2015	Best Director	Mad Max: Fury Road	Won

=== London Film Critics' Circle ===
Year	Category	Nominated work	Result
2016	Director of the Year	Mad Max: Fury Road	Won

=== National Board of Review ===
Year	Category	Nominated work	Result
2015	Top Ten Films	Mad Max: Fury Road	Won
2024	Top Ten Films	Furiosa: A Mad Max Saga	Honored
2024	Outstanding Achievement in Stunt Artistry	Furiosa: A Mad Max Saga	Honored

=== Producers Guild of America Awards ===
Year	Nominated work	Category	Result
2007	Outstanding Producer of Animated Theatrical Motion Pictures	Happy Feet	Nominated
2015	Darryl F. Zanuck Award for Outstanding Producer of Theatrical Motion Pictures	Mad Max: Fury Road	Nominated

=== Saturn Award ===
Year	Category	Nominated work	Result
1996	Best Fantasy Film	Babe	Won
1996	Best Writing	Babe	Nominated
2016	Best Director	Mad Max: Fury Road	Nominated
2016	Best Writing	Mad Max: Fury Road	Nominated
2025	Best Science Fiction Film	Furiosa: A Mad Max Saga	Nominated

=== Writers Guild of America Awards ===
Year	Category	Nominated work	Result
1993	Best Screenplay Written Directly for the Screenplay	Lorenzo's Oil	Nominated
1996	Best Screenplay Based on Material Previously Produced or Published	Babe	Nominated
