= Into the Shadows =

- Directed by: Andrew Scarano; Phil Hignett
- Release date: 2009
- Running time: 88 minutes
- Country: Australia
- Language: English

Into the Shadows is a 2009 documentary film by co-directors Andrew Scarano and Phil Hignett about the state of Australian cinema. Into the Shadows placed 2nd in the Audience Award for Documentary in the 2009 Canberra International Film Festival.

== Reception ==
Reviewing from SBS News, Simon Foster stated that the film was "a love letter to the bygone days of independent exhibition and a savaging of the big-business practices that bled the ma-and-pa cinema sector to near-death", praising the presentations of "the debate of culture-vs-profit". He concluded that the film was "lovingly- and exhaustingly-produced achievement". Luke Buckmaster from Crikey described the film as "dense, compelling and cheaply produced documentary", stating that the presentations of directors, actors, writers, and distributors was "an impressive cross-section". However, he criticised the film's "no clear-cut solutions" and its narrow audience appeal. Jonathan Dawson (ABC) described it as "a gallant tale of a cinema industry always under siege". Miguel Gonzalez (Mumbrella) reported the film was "about why independent cinemas are disappearing and most Australians films fail with mainstream audiences" and that it presented "an authentic who’s who industry interviewees who suggest that the problem is as much about exhibition and terms of trade as it is about content." In his review, Karl Quinn (The Age) explained the motivation behind the film: "Andrew Scarano had in mind a simple project: he wanted to document the final days of the Electric Shadows, the Canberra cinema where his grandfather was the projectionist for 27 years. But as he talked to people in the industry, he soon realised that the demise of one independent cinema offered a glimpse into the plight of the business as a whole." Tom Ryan (Sun-Herald) rated it 3/10. Sandra Hall (Sydney Morning Herald) described it as a documentary that "looks at the troubled workings of the industry from all angles" and rated it 3.5/5. Mark Juddery (The Australian) wrote that "Though it's worthwhile viewing for any aspiring Australian filmmaker, the revered Australian Film, Television and Radio School may think twice before screening it" because it, as well as "the leading movie chains, Hoyts and Greater Union, are also given a serve". Des Partridge (Adelaide Advertiser) described it as a documentary "which should be compulsory viewing for anyone who wants a simple history of film-making in Australia". Into the Shadows also placed 2nd in the Audience Award for Documentary in the 2009 Canberra International Film Festival.
