= City West (TV series) =

1984 Australian TV series

- Written by: Colin Free; Cliff Green
- Starring: Grigor Taylor; Rebecca Gilling; Gosia Dobrowolska
- Country of origin: Australia
- Original languages: English; Greek; Italian; Serb-Croatian; Polish; Russian

Original release
- Network: SBS
- Release: 17 October – 28 November 1984

City West is a 1984 Australian TV series about a migrant community.

== Cast ==
=== Main / regular ===
- Grigor Taylor as Jack Cheney
- Rebecca Gilling as Jean Cheney
- Gosia Dobrowolska as Nada Stankovic
- Lex Marinos as Tim Pappas
- Henri Szeps as Dr Mikus Kuskis
- Jeff Ashby as Stanley Duncan
- John Clayton
- Robert Hughes

=== Guests ===
- Arky Michael as Alec Pontes
