= Glenview High =

Australian television series

- Starring: Grigor Taylor; Rebecca Gilling; Elaine Lee; Ken James; Bill Kerr; Camilla Rountree
- Country of origin: Australia
- Original language: English
- No. of episodes: 39

Production
- Production locations: Sydney, New South Wales, Australia
- Running time: 50 minutes
- Production company: Grundy Television Productions

Original release
- Network: Seven Network
- Release: 27 September 1977 – 24 February 1979

Glenview High is an Australian television drama series produced by the Reg Grundy Organisation for the Seven Network between 1977 and 1978.

== Story ==
English teacher Greg Walker (Grigor Taylor) transfers from the country to Glenview High, a tough high school in Sydney. He clashes with rebellious students Tony Moore (Brandon Burke) and Danny Smith (Brett Hinch). Despite his toughness, Tony has a grudging respect for Mr Walker while Danny is only interested in being popular with the female students.

Other staff at the school are efficient yet sympathetic principal Margaret Gibson (Elaine Lee), and cynical science teacher Harry Carter (Bill Kerr) who regards all students as the enemy.

Greg's home life is also shown. He moves in with his brother Tom (Ken James), who boards platonically with flight attendant Robbie Dean (Rebecca Gilling) and the ditzy Jill Beamish (Camilla Rountree).

== Cast ==
=== Main ===
- Grigor Taylor as Greg Walker
- Brandon Burke as Tony Moore
- Brett Hinch as Danny Smith
- Elaine Lee as Margaret Gibson
- Bill Kerr as Harry Carter
- Ken James as Tom Walker
- Rebecca Gilling as Robbie Dean
- Camilla Rountree as Jill Beamish

== Production ==
The first season of 16 episodes cost $1 million to make. The production team spent three months of research time, working with teachers, students and the education department.
