= Dearest Enemy (TV series) =

- Genre: Comedy
- Written by: Michael Riordan
- Starring: Grigor Taylor; John Wood; Bruce Spence; Frank Wilson; Linden Wilkinson
- Country of origin: Australia
- Original language: English
- No. of episodes: 15

Production
- Producers: Geoff Portman; John O'Grady
- Running time: 30 mins

Original release
- Network: ABC
- Release: 8 May 1989 – 1992

Dearest Enemy is a 1989 Australian sitcom about two newlyweds. The pilot episode starred John Waters and Jacki Weaver, who were replaced by Grigor Taylor and Linden Wilkinson for season one in 1989. In season two (1992), John Wood replaced Taylor.

== Plot ==
Two newlyweds with different political views deal with them and move on.

== Cast ==
- Grigor Taylor as Anderson (1989)
- John Wood as Anderson (1992)
- Linden Wilkinson as Alex Taylor
- Frank Wilson as Walter Taylor
- Bruce Spence as Lenny
- Vic Hawkins as Simon
- John Waters (pilot only)
- Jacki Weaver (pilot only)
- Maggie Kirkpatrick (pilot only)
- Ernie Dingo (1 episode)

== Production ==
Writer Michael Riordan's father Joe was a housing minister in the Whitman government. He approached John O'Grady and Geoff Portmann, the producers of Mother and Son, then shot a pilot in 1987 with Jacki Weaver and John Waters. Neither reprised their roles - he for stage commitments and she because of another sitcom, House Rules.

Critical reception was mixed.

The show returned in 1992 with John Wood replacing Taylor.
