= Queensland Expatriate Awards =

The Queensland Expatriate Awards, are the most prominent awards to expatriates from the state of Queensland Australia who are living around the world.

Awarded annually by the Queensland Government since 2005, it is a chance to give the Premier of Queensland an opportunity to formally award and recognize the efforts of those individuals, whose work internationally has brought benefit to the State of Queensland, and promote and celebrate Queensland’s success on the international stage.

== The Awards ==
- The Premier of Queensland's Expatriate Achievement Award
- The Queensland - United States Personal Achievement Award
- The Steve Irwin Memorial Goodwill Ambassador Award
- The Premier of Queensland's Champion Award

== Premier of Queensland's Expatriate Achievement Award ==
This Award is presented to prominent Queensland expatriates to acknowledge their high levels of achievement in their chosen profession and who are strong ambassadors of the State of Queensland worldwide.

The past winners include:

2005 – Presented by the then Premier Hon Peter Beattie MP at Grand Central Terminal, New York City:

- Elissa Burke
- Christine Zorzi
- Cameron McCarthy

2006 – Presented by the then Deputy Premier Hon Anna Bligh MP at The Peninsula, Beverly Hills:

- Dr. Gary Roubin

2007 - presented by the then Premier Hon Peter Beattie MP at the Rainbow Room, New York City:

- Andrew N. Liveris

== Queensland - United States Personal Achievement Award ==
This Award is to recognize prominent Queenslanders who have achieved high levels of success in their chosen field in the United States without having the need to permanently relocate from Australia.

The past winners include:

2007 - presented by the then Premier Hon Peter Beattie MP at the Rainbow Room, New York City:

- George Miller (producer)

== Steve Irwin Memorial Goodwill Ambassador Award ==
This award is to honour arguably Queensland’s greatest cultural and goodwill ambassador, Steve Irwin. The award is awarded to individuals that share Mr. Irwin’s enthusiasm and legacy for making a difference in the world with pursuits that brings benefit to the State of Queensland.

The past winners include:

2007 - presented by the then Premier Hon Peter Beattie MP at the Rainbow Room, New York City:

- Clark Bunting

== Premier of Queensland's Champion Award ==
This Award is presented to non-Queensland individuals or organizations acknowledging their efforts in championing the State of Queensland.

The past winners include:

2006 – Presented by the then Deputy Premier Hon Anna Bligh MP at The Peninsula, Beverly Hills:

- Paul Zorner

2007 - presented by the then Premier Hon Peter Beattie MP at the Rainbow Room, New York City:

- Karl Kelly
