= Grigor Taylor =

Australian actor

- Born: 1 January 1943
- Occupation: Actor
- Years active: 1967–1993

Grigor Taylor is an Australian former actor, best known for his parts in several television series including Matlock Police and Glenview High and film Mad Max 2

== Career ==
Taylor was a former English teacher at Marist Brothers, Parramatta, Westmead Campus, before he began his acting career.

Grigor Taylor became a professional actor in 1967 and starred in the first 99 episodes of TV series Matlock Police as Senior Detective Alan Curtis. Between 1974 and 1975 Taylor portrayed Steve Hamilton in Silent Number

In 1977–78, he portrayed an English high school teacher, Greg Walker, in series Glenview High.

Taylor took many other parts in Australian television series such as A Country Practice, Homicide, Special Squad, City West, The Flying Doctors, Butterfly Island, Dearest Enemy and Mission: Impossible.

Taylor also acted in several feature films, including High Rolling, Mad Max 2, and Afraid to Dance.

== Filmography ==
=== Film ===
Title	Year	Role	Type
1977	High Rolling	Alby	Feature film
1981	Mad Max 2		Feature film
1987	Emma's War	Dr. Friedlander	Feature film
1988	The Clean Machine	Detetive Sgt. Warren Davis	TV movie
1988	After Marcuse	Warren	TV movie
1989	Afraid to Dance	Jim Pratt	Feature film
1991	Innocent Prey (aka Voyeur)	Rick	Feature film

=== Television ===
Title	Year	Role	Type
1971–73	Matlock Police	Senior Detective Alan Curtis	TV series
1974	Behind the Legend	Burrowes	TV series
1974	Silent Number	Steve Hamilton	TV series
1975	Homicide	Doug Lambert	TV series
1976	McCloud	Eric Taylor	TV series
1976	The Outsiders	Otto Benson	TV series
1976	Bluey	Evan Dillon	TV series
1977–78	Glenview High	Greg Walker	TV series
1978	Case for the Defence	Ari Ben-Leon	TV series
1982	A Most Attractive Man		
1984	The Explorers	Leichhardt	TV documentary series
1984	City West	Jack Chenney	TV series
1983–85	A Country Practice	2 roles	TV series
1985	Special Squad	Bob Daley	TV series
1985–87	Butterfly Island	Charlie Wilson	TV series
1988	All the Way	Mike O'Brian	TV miniseries
1988	The Last Resort	Len	TV series
1988	Vampire Princess Miyu	Clerk	TV miniseries
1988	The Flying Doctors	Johnny McDonald	TV series
1989	Dearest Enemy	Anderson Morley	TV series
1989	Mission: Impossible	Defence Minister, Ivan Savitch	TV series
1991	Rafferty's Rules	Warren East	TV series
