= Camilla Rountree =

Australian actress

- Occupation(s): Actress, Costume designer
- Notable work: We of the Never Never

Camilla Rountree (also credited as Camilla Rowntree) is an Australian actress and costume designer. She was nominated for the 1982 Australian Film Institute Award for Best Achievement in Costume Design for the film We of the Never Never

As an actress Rountree featured in the TV series Glenview High and Bellbird. On stage she featured in The Formation Dancers (Marian Street Theatre, 1976)
