= A Most Attractive Man =

1982 short film

- Directed by: Rivka Hartman
- Produced by: Gillian Coote
- Starring: Grigor Taylor
- Cinematography: Erika Addis
- Edited by: Denise Haslem
- Release date: 1982
- Running time: 48 minutes
- Country: Australia
- Language: English
- Budget: $50,000

A Most Attractive Man is a 1982 Australian film directed by Rivka Hartman. It is based on a autobiographical script given to Hartman by a friend. Hartman made multiple changes to the script resulting in the scriptwriter withdrawing support and choosing to be anonymous. It was made on a small budget with the crew working on deferred wages.

Neil Jillett of the Age said "This film, made with precision, economy and verbal and visual wit, gives a sharp, if slightly romanticised, view of life below the poverty line." The Australian Jewish News' Julian Lewis review finishes "Aside from its ‘look’, and good intentions, “A Most Attractive Man” is always effective."

The film won 1982 Australian Film Institute Award for Best Short Fiction Film.

== Cast ==
- Grigor Taylor as Dorian
- Carole Skinner as Frances
- Julie McGregor as Judy
- Anna Volska as Vija
- Dennis Miller as Mick Davies
- Cathy Downes as Merryl
- Anne Tenney
