= George Miller (filmmaker) =

Australian filmmaker (born 1945)

George Miller AO
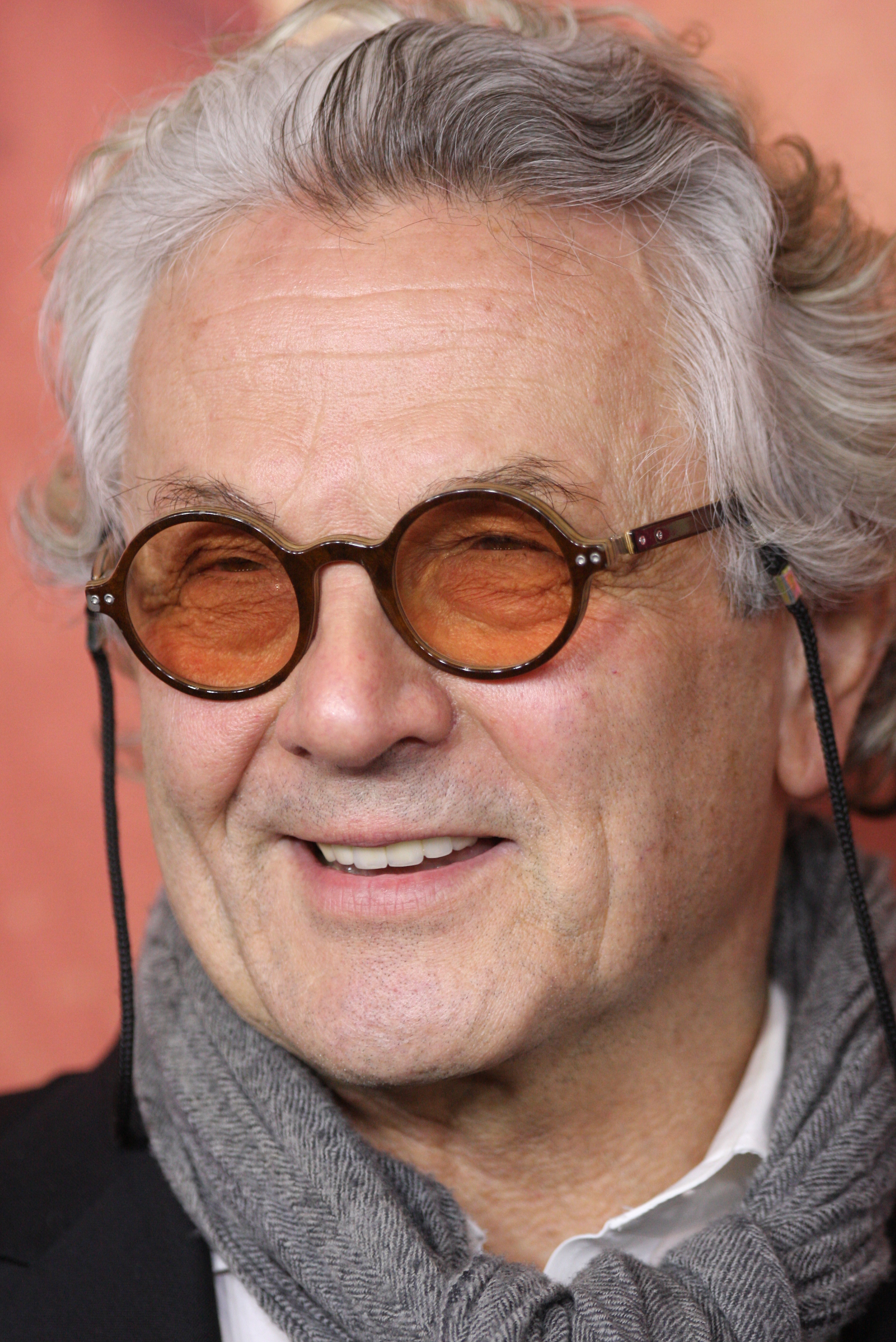
- Miller in 2017
- Born: 3 March 1945 (age 81); Chinchilla, Queensland, Australia
- Education: Sydney Boys High School, Ipswich Grammar School
- Alma mater: University of New South Wales
- Occupations: Director; producer; writer; former medical doctor
- Years active: 1971–present
- Spouses: Sandy Gore (m. 1985; div. 1992) Margaret Sixel (m. 1995)
- Children: 3
- Relatives: Bill Miller (brother)
- Awards: Full list

George Miller (born 3 March 1945) is an Australian filmmaker. In a career spanning four decades, he has received critical and popular success, and is widely known for creating and directing every film in the Mad Max franchise starting in 1979, including two entries which are considered two of the greatest action films of all time according to Metacritic. Miller has earned numerous accolades, including an Academy Award from six nominations in five different categories.

Miller's directing career started in Australia with the first three Mad Max films between 1979 and 1985 with his friend and producing partner Byron Kennedy, after which he transitioned to Hollywood with The Witches of Eastwick (1987). His family drama Lorenzo's Oil (1992) earned him his first Academy Award nomination after which he produced and co-wrote Babe (1995) and directed the sequel Babe: Pig in the City (1998). He would venture into animation with Happy Feet (2006), for which he won the Academy Award for Best Animated Feature, and the sequel Happy Feet Two (2011), before returning to Mad Max with the acclaimed Mad Max: Fury Road (2015), which went on to win six Academy Awards, and Furiosa: A Mad Max Saga (2024).

Trained in medicine at the University of New South Wales, Miller worked as a physician for several years before entering the film industry. Miller and Kennedy are the founders of the production house Kennedy Miller Mitchell. Since the death of Kennedy in 1983, his main producers have been his younger brother Bill Miller and Doug Mitchell. Other accolades include a British Academy Film Award, a Critics Choice Awards, a Golden Globe Award and six Australian Academy of Cinema and Television Arts Awards.

== Early life and education ==
Miller was born on 3 March 1945 in Chinchilla, Queensland, to Greek immigrant parents Jim and Angela Miller. Jim (aka Dimitrios) was born on the Greek island of Kythira near Mitata. Jim's father anglicised his surname from Miliotis to Miller when he emigrated to Australia in 1920. Angela's family were Greek refugees from Anatolia, displaced by the 1923 population exchange.

Miller attended Ipswich Grammar School and later Sydney Boys High School, then studied medicine at the University of New South Wales with his twin brother John. While in his final year at medical school (1971), he and his younger brother Chris made a one-minute short film St. Vincent's Revue Film that won the first prize in a student competition.

In 1971, George attended a film workshop at Melbourne University where he met fellow student Byron Kennedy, with whom he formed a lasting friendship and production partnership, until Kennedy's death. In 1972, Miller completed his residency at Sydney's St Vincent's Hospital, spending his time off crewing on short experimental films. That same year, Miller and Kennedy founded Kennedy Miller Productions. The pair subsequently collaborated on numerous works. After Kennedy died in 1983, Miller kept his name in the company. It was later renamed Kennedy Miller Mitchell in 2009 as a way to recognise producer Doug Mitchell's role in the company.

== Career ==
=== 1971–1985: Ozploitation and Mad Max trilogy ===
Miller's first work, the short film Violence in Cinema: Part 1 (1971), polarised critics, audiences and distributors so much that it was placed in the documentary category at the 1972 Sydney Film Festival due to its matter-of-fact depiction of cinematic violence. In 1979, Miller made his feature-length directorial debut with Mad Max. Based on a script written by Miller and James McCausland in 1975, the film was independently financed by Kennedy Miller Productions and went on to become an international success. As a result, the film spawned the Mad Max series with two further sequels starring Mel Gibson: Mad Max 2 also released as The Road Warrior (1981) and Mad Max Beyond Thunderdome (1985).

During the time between the second and third Mad Max films, Miller directed a remake of "Nightmare at 20,000 Feet" as a segment for the anthology film Twilight Zone: The Movie (1983). Despite not being involved or present, the infamous helicopter crash shook him, leading to a re-evaluation of the stunt-work in his future films. He also co-produced and co-directed many acclaimed miniseries for Australian television including The Dismissal (1983) and The Cowra Breakout (1984).

=== 1987–1995: Established director ===
In 1987, Miller directed The Witches of Eastwick, starring Jack Nicholson, Susan Sarandon, Cher and Michelle Pfeiffer. The film proved to be a troubling experience for Miller. "I quit the film twice and Jack [Nicholson] held me in there," said Miller. "He said, 'Just sit down, lose your emotion, and have a look at the work. If you think the work is good, stick with the film.' And he was a great man. I learnt more from him than anybody else I've worked with - he was extraordinary." Nicholson also coached Miller to exaggerate his needs during the production, asking for 300 extras when he only needed 150, knowing that his producers would give him less than he requested. The award-winning production designer Polly Platt also collaborated closely with Miller on The Witches of Eastwick. Cher later said that prior to working on the film, Miller called her at home, the day after her 40th birthday, to inform her that he and Nicholson didn't want her in the film. She was deemed "too old and not sexy".

Following The Witches of Eastwick, Miller focused primarily on producing Australian projects. His role as producer of Flirting, Dead Calm and the TV miniseries Bangkok Hilton and Vietnam, all starring Nicole Kidman, was instrumental in the development of her career. Miller returned to directing with the release of the biographical medical drama Lorenzo's Oil (1992), which he co-wrote with Nick Enright. The film starred Nick Nolte and Susan Sarandon. The film received critical acclaim with Variety describing the film as a "true-life story brought to the screen intelligently and with passionate motivation by George Miller". For his work on the film Miller was nominated for the Academy Award and Writers Guild of America Award for Best Original Screenplay.

=== 1995–2011: Babe and Happy Feet films ===
In 1995, Miller produced and co-wrote the comedy-drama Babe directed by Chris Noonan. The film was a critical and financial success. The film earned 7 Academy Award nominations including for Miller for Best Adapted Screenplay. Three years later, Miller went on to write and direct its sequel Babe: Pig in the City (1998). The film would be a commercial failure due to competition with A Bug's Life and The Rugrats Movie. Chicago Sun-Times critic Roger Ebert gave the film four stars praising Miller's work on the sequel writing, "It outdoes itself with the sets and special effects that make up "the city." And it is still literate, humane and wicked. George Miller, who produced, directed and co-wrote the film, has improved and extended the ideas in Babe: Pig in the City, instead of being content to copy them." Critic Gene Siskel of the Chicago Tribune named it the Best film of 1998.

In 1995, Miller also produced Video Fool for Love, a controversial and divisive cinema verité documentary shot on video by film editor Robert Gibson that deals with Gibson's personal life and relationship issues.

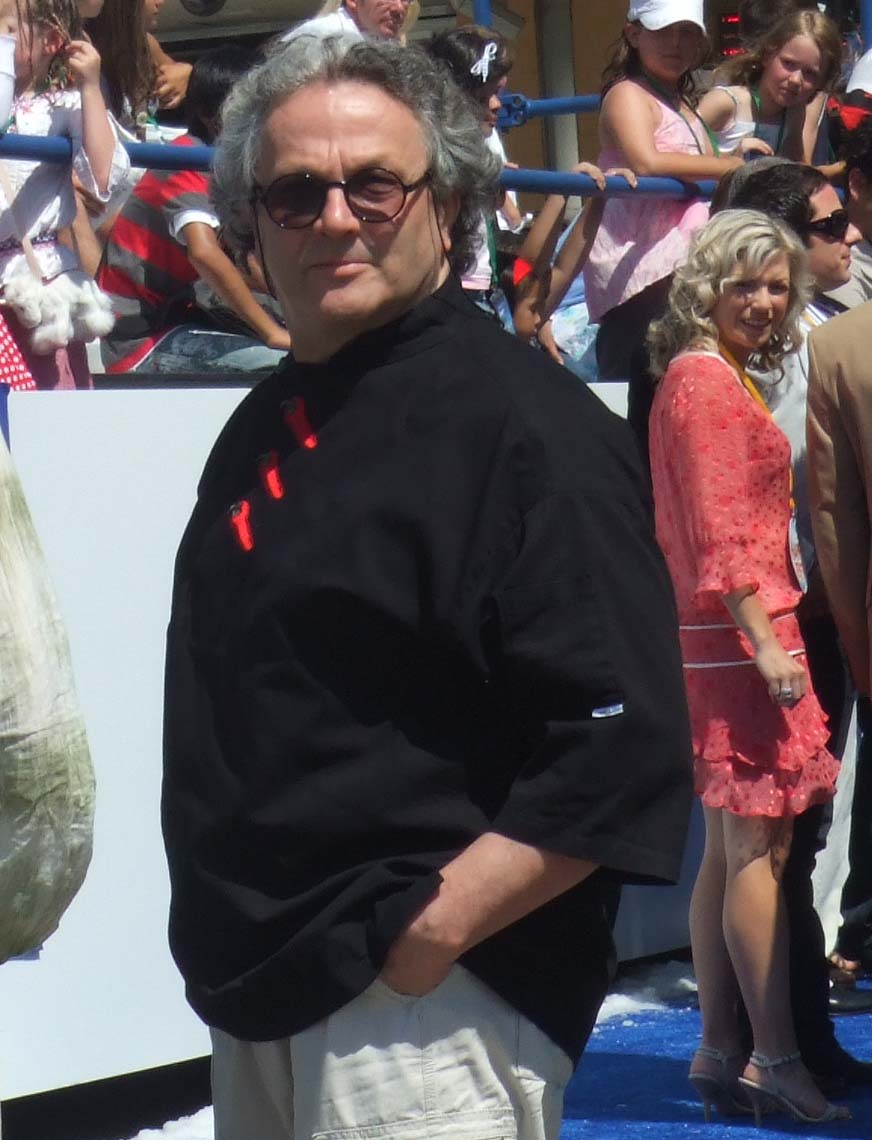
Miller at the Australian premiere of Happy Feet in 2006

Miller was also the creator of the animated jukebox musical film Happy Feet (2006) about the life of penguins in Antarctica. The Warner Bros.-produced film was released in November 2006. It was a runaway box office success earning $363 million worldwide, and also brought Miller his fourth Academy Award nomination, and his first win in the category of Best Animated Feature. Manohla Dargis of The New York Times praised the film writing, "Miller...shows a remarkable persistence of vision. Even in a story about singing-and-dancing fat and feather, Mr. Miller can't help but go dark and deep" adding, "[He] brings an unusual depth of feeling to his work as well as a distinct moral worldview".

As a partnership between his production company Kennedy Miller Mitchell and Omnilab Media, George Miller co-founded Dr. D Studios, a Sydney-based digital animation studio in mid-2007. In 2011, the Happy Feet sequel Happy Feet Two was released by Dr. D Studios. But following the financially unsuccessful release of Happy Feet Two and the long delay of Mad Max: Fury Road (2015), the studio closed down in 2013.

=== 2015–present: Career resurgence ===
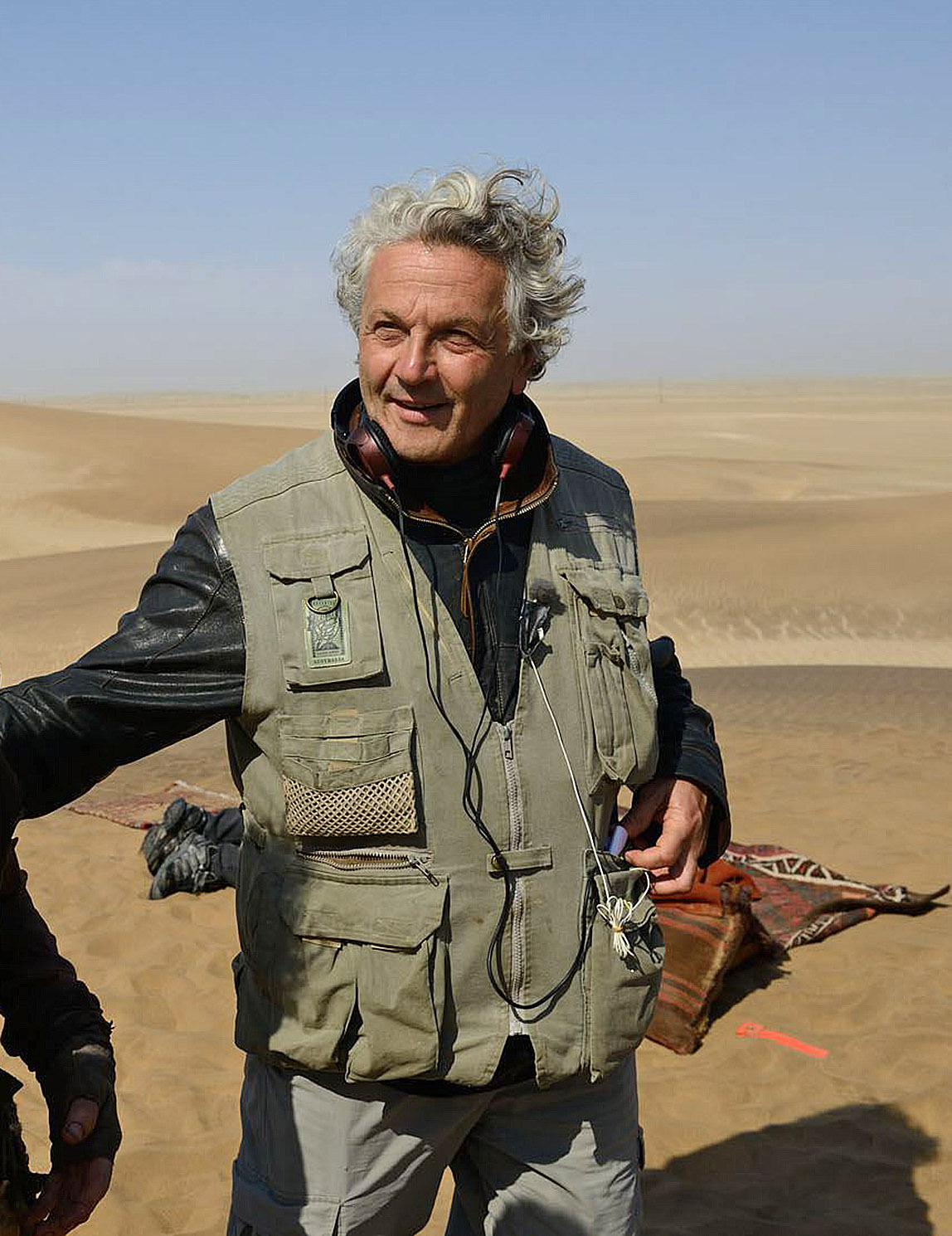
Miller on the set of Mad Max: Fury Road, 2012

In 2012, Miller began principal photography on Mad Max: Fury Road, the fourth film in the Mad Max series, after several years of production delays. Fury Road starring Tom Hardy and Charlize Theron was released on 15 May 2015. The film became a box office success and was met with widespread critical acclaim with several critics calling it one of the greatest action films ever made. A.O. Scott of The New York Times labeled it a "New York Times Critic's Pick" writing, "Miller has always stayed true to his scrappy, pragmatic roots. At 70, he has a master craftsman's intuitive sense of proportion and a visual artisan's mistrust of extraneous verbiage" adding, "It's all great fun, and quite rousing as well — a large-scale genre movie that is at once unpretentious and unafraid to bring home a message". It went on to receive 10 Academy Award nominations including Best Picture, while Miller himself was nominated for the Academy Award for Best Director.

In October 2018 it was announced that Miller would direct Three Thousand Years of Longing, which began filming in November 2020. The film starring Idris Elba and Tilda Swinton premiered at the Cannes Film Festival in May 2022. Peter Bradshaw of The Guardian described the film as "a heartfelt Aladdin-esque adventure for grownups" adding, "Miller shows he is now doing one-for-him-and-one-that's-even-more-for-him. It's an Arabian Nights-type fantasia which he has clearly been gagging to make for years". Justin Chang of NPR wrote that "Miller unveils an outlandish premise with a sly wit that's initially hard to resist" but added the film "ends on a muted, uncertain note". The film was a box office bomb grossing $20 million worldwide off a budget of $60 million.

In 2020, it was reported that Miller would next direct the Mad Max spinoff Furiosa: A Mad Max Saga starring Anya Taylor-Joy and Chris Hemsworth. The film premiered at the 2024 Cannes Film Festival to critical acclaim. Manohla Dargis of The New York Times gave the film a "NYT Critic's Pick" declaring, "Miller is such a wildly inventive filmmaker that it's been easy to forget that he keeps making movies about the end of life as we know it. It's a blast watching his characters fight over oil, water and women, yet while I've long thought of him as a great filmmaker it's only with Furiosa that I now understand he's also one kick-ass prophet of doom."

=== Unrealized and upcoming projects ===
Following Mad Max, Miller was offered plenty of Hollywood jobs, but he turned most of them down because he wanted to develop a rock and roll movie, the working title of which was Roxanne. After working together on the novelization of Mad Max, Miller and Terry Hayes teamed up in Los Angeles to write Roxanne, but the script was ultimately shelved. He would instead go on to direct Mad Max 2.

In 1985, the Los Angeles Times reported that Miller was being strongly considered to direct Dennis Feldman's original screenplay The Golden Child, as star Eddie Murphy was an "avowed fan" of Miller's Mad Max films. However, a subsequent news item claimed that Murphy, who had director approval per his Paramount Pictures contract, rejected Miller for the position. Michael Ritchie was instead selected and the film released the following year.

In 1993, Miller was hired to direct Contact based on the story by Carl Sagan and Ann Druyan. Contact commenced pre-production. Miller cast Jodie Foster in the lead role, approached Ralph Fiennes to play Palmer Joss and also considered casting Linda Hunt as the President of the United States. In addition to having aliens put on a laser lighting display around Earth, another version of the Goldenberg scripts had an alien wormhole swallow up the planet, transporting Earth to the center of the galaxy. Miller also asked Goldenberg to rewrite Contact in an attempt to portray the Pope as a key supporting character. Warner Bros. was hoping to have the film ready for release by Christmas 1996, but under Miller's direction pre-production lasted longer than expected. Warner Bros. fired Miller, blaming pushed-back start dates, budget concerns, and Miller's insistence that the script needed five more weeks of rewriting after working on the film for over a year. Robert Zemeckis was eventually brought on to direct.

In September 2007, Miller signed on to direct a Justice League film titled Justice League: Mortal. While production was initially held up due to the 2007–08 Writers Guild of America strike, further production delays and the success of The Dark Knight led to Warner Bros. deciding to put the film on hold and pursue different options.

On October 17, 2008, Miller was planning on directing an adaptation of the Odyssey, set in space with Brad Pitt producing the movie for Warner Bros. On January 14, 2013, Warner Bros. revived the project, with a new script by James DiLapo, without Miller and Pitt's involvements. Since then, there have been no further announcements.

On November 29, 2011, Doug Mitchell revealed that Miller was attached to Fur Brigade, an animated bear movie. Since then, there have been no further announcements.

In a November 2011 interview, Miller was asked if he had any plans for Happy Feet Three. He replied by saying: "if you put a gun to my head and said, You have to come up with a story for Happy Feet Three, I'd say shoot me. I would have no idea. I really would have no idea. The stories creep up on you. You just have to allow the stories to come, and then they get in like little ear worms in your head and they won't go away. If that happens and we've got the energy, we'll do a third one. If it doesn't happen, it doesn't happen. That's the only way you can do it. It has to be authentic. I really wanted to make this film better than the first one. Otherwise, at my age, what's the point? You really want to make it better. If something comes up that's really exciting and I can convey that enthusiasm to other people, then there would be a third one."

In 2011, Miller and McCarthy found during the writing process for Mad Max: Fury Road that they had enough story material for two additional scripts. One of these, entitled Mad Max: Furiosa, had already been completed, and Miller hoped to film it after the release of Fury Road. In March 2015, during an interview with Esquire, Hardy revealed that he was attached to star in three more Mad Max films following Fury Road. In May 2015, Miller told Wired: "Should Fury Road be successful, I've got two other stories to tell." Later in May, Miller revealed that plans for the sequel had changed and the fifth film in the franchise will instead be titled Mad Max: The Wasteland. In October 2015, Miller's team had two scripts for sequels which they ended up with during the writing process. Later that month, he clarified that Mad Max: The Wasteland was a working title for the sequel. Miller reaffirmed his intent to continue the franchise after reports to the contrary surfaced following an interview in January 2016. In November 2017, it was reported that a lawsuit filed by Miller's production company against Warner Bros. over a disputed $7 million bonus was likely to delay the production of any sequels. In July 2019, Miller told IndieWire: "There are two stories, both involving Mad Max, and also a Furiosa story. We're still solving, we've got to play out the Warners thing, it seems to be pretty clear that it's going to happen." Production of the sequels and spinoffs were delayed until after the lawsuit was settled.

In 2015, Miller was planning on directing Akira, the live-action remake of the film of the same name, but he left due to scheduling conflicts with Mad Max: Fury Road.

== Personal life ==
Miller was married to actress Sandy Gore from 1985 to 1992; they have a daughter. He has been married to film editor Margaret Sixel since 1995. They have two sons. Sixel has worked in some capacity on many of Miller's directorial efforts. Miller is a feminist, having told Vanity Fair in May 2015, "I've gone from being very male dominant to being surrounded by magnificent women. I can't help but be a feminist."

Miller is the patron of the Australian Film Institute and the Brisbane International Film Festival, and a co-patron of the Sydney Film Festival.

Miller has said many times that the 1940 version of Pinocchio is one of his favourite films.

== Filmography ==
=== Feature film ===
Year	Title	Director	Writer	Producer	Notes
1979	Mad Max	Yes	Yes	No	
1981	Mad Max 2	Yes	Yes	No	Also additional editor
1983	Twilight Zone: The Movie	Yes	No	No	Segment: "Nightmare at 20,000 Feet"
1985	Mad Max Beyond Thunderdome	Yes	Yes	Yes	Co-directed with George Ogilvie
1987	The Witches of Eastwick	Yes	No	No	
1992	Lorenzo's Oil	Yes	Yes	Yes	
1995	Babe	No	Yes	Yes	
1997	40,000 Years of Dreaming	Yes	Yes	No	Documentary, also presenter
1998	Babe: Pig in the City	Yes	Yes	Yes	
2006	Happy Feet	Yes	Yes	Yes	
2011	Happy Feet Two	Yes	Yes	Yes	
2015	Mad Max: Fury Road	Yes	Yes	Yes	
2022	Three Thousand Years of Longing	Yes	Yes	Yes	
2024	Furiosa: A Mad Max Saga	Yes	Yes	Yes	

Producer

Year	Title	Notes
1987	The Year My Voice Broke	
1989	Dead Calm	Also second unit director
1991	Flirting	
1996	Video Fool for Love	Documentary

Other credits

Year	Title	Role
1978	In Search of Anna	First assistant director
1980	The Chain Reaction	Second unit director (uncredited) and associate producer

=== Short film ===
Year	Title	Director	Writer	Notes
1971	"St. Vincent's Revue Film"	Yes	Yes	
1971	"Violence in the Cinema, Part 1"	Yes	Yes	
1974	"The Devil in Evening Dress"	Yes	Yes	

=== Television ===
Year	Title	Director	Writer	Producer	Notes
1983	The Dismissal	Yes	Yes	Yes	TV miniseries
1984	The Last Bastion	Yes	No	No	TV miniseries
1984	Bodyline	No	Story	Yes	TV miniseries

Producer

Year	Title	Notes
1985	The Cowra Breakout	TV miniseries
1987	Vietnam	TV miniseries
1988	The Dirtwater Dynasty	TV miniseries
1988	The Clean Machine	TV film
1988	The Riddle of the Stinson	TV film
1988	Fragments of War: The Story of Damien Parer	TV film
1988	Sportz Crazy	Documentary miniseries
1989	Bangkok Hilton	TV miniseries

=== Music videos ===
Year	Title	Artist
1985	"We Don't Need Another Hero"	Tina Turner
1985	"One of the Living"	Tina Turner

=== Video games ===
Year	Title	Role	Notes
2025	Death Stranding 2: On the Beach	Tarman	Likeness only

== Awards and recognition ==
Year	Title	Academy Awards		BAFTA Awards		Golden Globe Awards	
Year	Title	Nominations	Wins	Nominations	Wins	Nominations	Wins
1985	Mad Max Beyond Thunderdome					1	
1987	The Witches of Eastwick	2		1	1		
1992	Lorenzo's Oil	2				1	
1998	Babe: Pig in the City	1		1			
2006	Happy Feet	1	1	2	1	2	1
2015	Mad Max: Fury Road	10	6	7	4	2	
Total		16	7	11	6	6	1

- 1996: Appointed an Officer of the Order of Australia (AO)
- 1999: Received an honorary Doctor of Letters from the University of New South Wales
- 2007: Received The Queensland – United States Personal Achievement Award at the Queensland Expatriate Awards at the Rainbow Room in New York
- 2007 (April): Awarded an honorary Master of Arts degree by the Australian Film Television and Radio School.
- 2008: Awarded an honorary Doctorate from the Griffith University.
- 2009: Awarded the French Order of the Arts and Letters.
- 2010: First non-US Filmmaker to be awarded "honorary member" status among the VES.
- 2016: Served as president of the jury for the Palme d'Or at the 69th Cannes Film Festival.
- 2018: Inducted into the Queensland Business Leaders Hall of Fame.
