= Canberra International Film Festival =

Annual film festival held in Australia

- Location: National Film and Sound Archive, Acton, Australian Capital Territory, Australia
- Founded: 1996
- Festival date: October/November
- Website: ciff.com.au

The Canberra International Film Festival (CIFF) is an annual film festival held in Canberra, Australia. It is a cinema celebration across an 11-day program in October/November each year. It is a showcase of films from Australia and around the globe.

In addition to screening feature films and documentaries, there is always a suite of additional events such as Q&A sessions, workshops and panel discussions with directors, producers, actors and the broad range of artists involved in the filmmaking process.

== History ==
The University of Canberra was the initiator of the Canberra International Film Festival. For each Festival from 1996 until 2001, either through its Convocation or directly, the university provided the artistic direction, and was also the promoter, manager and underwriter of the festival.

In 2002, as part of a comprehensive plan to restructure the Canberra International Film Festival and secure its future, ownership was transferred to an Incorporated Association. The Canberra International Film Festival is a not-for-profit organisation supported by local and federal government, corporate sponsors and cultural partners.

== Artistic directors ==
- Michael Sergi (1996–2008)
- Simon Weaving (2009–2012)
- Lex Lindsay (2013–2014)
- Alice Taylor (2016)
- Andrew Pike (2017–)

== CIFF Audience Awards ==
Year	Film	Director
1996	Children of the Revolution	(Australia) Peter Duncan
1997	The King of Masks	(China) Wu Tianming
1998	Radiance	(Australia) Rachel Perkins
1999	The Celebration	(Denmark) Thomas Vinterberg
2000	Himalaya	(France) Eric Valli
2001	Amélie; Monsoon Wedding	(France) Jean-Pierre Jeunet (India) Mira Nair
2003	Good Bye Lenin!	(Germany) Wolfgang Becker
2005	Innocent Voices	(Mexico) Luis Mandoki
2006	Who Killed the Electric Car?	(United States) Chris Paine
2007	The Diving Bell and the Butterfly	(United States) Julian Schnabel
2008	Bliss	(Turkey) Abdullah Oguz
2009	Five Minutes of heaven	(United Kingdom) Oliver Hirschbiegel
2010	On Childhood	(Mexico) Carlos Carrera
2011	Life, Above All	(South Africa) Oliver Schmitz
2012	The Hunt	(Denmark) Thomas Vinterberg
2013	Once My Mother	(Australia) Sophia Turkiewicz

== Other film festivals ==
- Canberra Short Film Festival
