= Hank Nelson =

Australian historian

Hank Nelson AM, FASSA
- Born: 21 October 1937; Boort, Victoria
- Died: 17 February 2012 (aged 74); Canberra, Australian Capital Territory
- Awards: Fellow of the Academy of the Social Sciences in Australia (1994); Member of the Order of Australia (2008)

Academic background
- Education: University of Melbourne (BA, MEd); University of Papua New Guinea (PhD)

Academic work
- Institutions: University of Papua New Guinea; Australian National University
- Main interests: History of Papua New Guinea; Australian prisoner of war experience

Hyland Neil "Hank" Nelson AM, FASSA (21 October 1937 – 17 February 2012) was one of Australia's foremost historians of the Pacific, particularly Papua New Guinea. His interest in the region began in 1966 when he took a teaching position at the Administrative College of Papua New Guinea and later the University. He lived in Papua New Guinea for seven years and studied the period of Japanese occupation, which led to several publications.

He worked on several displays and archival material at the Australian War Memorial about the war in Papua New Guinea, as well as films and radio documentaries. He was Emeritus Professor and Visiting Fellow at the Australian National University's Research School of Pacific and Asian Studies (RSPAS) until his death from cancer in February 2012.

== Bibliography ==
=== Books ===
- —; Jinks, Brian; Biskup, Peter (1970). A Short History of New Guinea. Sydney: Angus and Robertson. ISBN 9780207120725.
- — (1972). Papua-New Guinea: Black Unity or Black Chaos?. Ringwood, Victoria: Penguin Books. ISBN 9780140214062.
- — (1976). Black, White and Gold: Gold Mining in Papua New Guinea, 1878–1930. Canberra: Australian National University Press. ISBN 9780708104880.
- —; Griffin, James (1979). Papua New Guinea: A Political History. Richmond, Victoria: Heinemann Educational Australia. ISBN 9780858591974.
- — (1982). Taim Bilong Masta: The Australian Involvement with Papua New Guinea. Sydney: Australian Broadcasting Commission. ISBN 9780642975669.
- — (1985). P.O.W. Prisoners of War: Australians Under Nippon. Sydney: ABC Enterprises for the Australian Broadcasting Corp. ISBN 9780642527363.
- — (1989). With Its Hat About Its Ears: Recollections of the Bush School. Crows Nest, New South Wales: ABC Enterprises for the Australian Broadcasting Corp. ISBN 9780642129840.
- — (2002). From Wagga to Waddington: Australians in Bomber Command. London: Menzies Centre for Australian Studies. ISBN 1855071207.
- — (2002). Chased by the Sun: Courageous Australians in Bomber Command in World War II. Sydney: ABC Books for the Australian Broadcasting Corporation. ISBN 0733310702.
  - — (2006). Chased by the Sun: The Australians in Bomber Command in World War II (2nd ed.). Crows Nest, New South Wales: Allen & Unwin. ISBN 9781741148473.
- — (2007). Australian Prisoners of War, 1941–1945: Australians in the Pacific War. Canberra: Department of Veterans' Affairs. ISBN 978-1920720797.

=== Edited books ===
- —; Lutton, Nancy; Robertson, S., eds. (1969). Select Topics in the History of Papua and New Guinea. Port Moresby: University of Papua and New Guinea. ISBN 9780207124853.
- —; Jinks, Brian; Biskup, Peter, eds. (1973). Readings in New Guinea History. Sydney: Angus & Robertson. ISBN 9780207124853.
- —; May, R.J., eds. (1982). Melanesia: Beyond Diversity. Canberra: Research School of Pacific Studies, Australian National University. ISBN 9780867840452.
- —; McCormack, Gavan, eds. (1993). The Burma-Thailand Railway: Memory and History. St. Leonards, New South Wales: Allen & Unwin. ISBN 9781863734233.
- —; Lal, Brij V., eds. (1995). Lines Across the Sea: Colonial Inheritance in the Post Colonial Pacific. Brisbane: Pacific History Association. ISBN 0646246402.
- Stanton, Eddie A. (1996). Nelson, Hank (ed.). The War Diaries of Eddie Allan Stanton: Papua, 1942–45, New Guinea, 1945–46. St. Leonards, New South Wales: Allen & Unwin. ISBN 9781864480641.

=== Films ===
- Andrew Pike; Hank Nelson; Gavan Daws (1982). Angels of War: World War Two and the people of Papua New Guinea. Ronin Films.
