= Gavan Daws =

American writer, historian and filmmaker (1933–2025)

- Born: 1933; Australia
- Died: February 2, 2025 (aged 91–92)
- Education: University of Hawaii at Manoa Ph.D. University of Melbourne B.A.
- Occupation: Writer
- Writing career
- Language: English
- Notable work: A Shoal of Time

Gavan Daws (1933 – February 2, 2025) was an American writer, historian and filmmaker residing in Honolulu, Hawaii. He writes about Hawaii, the Pacific, and Asia. He was a retired professor of history at University of Hawaii at Manoa.

Daws was originally from Australia and received his B.A. in English and History from the University of Melbourne. He received a Ph.D. in Pacific History from the University of Hawaii at Manoa.

His best-known works were Shoal of Time: A History of the Hawaiian Islands, in print since 1968; Holy Man: Father Damien of Molokai, the biography of a nineteenth-century missionary priest to Hawaii who served leprosy sufferers, and who has recently been canonized; and Prisoners of the Japanese: POWs of World War II in the Pacific. Daws co-produced and co-directed Angels of War: The People of Papua New Guinea and World War II, which won the Australian Film Institute Award for Best Documentary. His other work included song lyrics and a stage play with music and choreography. He was a Fellow of the Academy of Humanities in Australia, and served as the Pacific member of the UNESCO Commission on the Scientific and Cultural History of Humankind.

Daws died on February 2, 2025, at the age of 91–92.

== Major works ==
- 1968: Shoal of time: A History of the Hawaiian Islands, Macmillan, New York.
- 1970: The Hawaiians (with Robert Goodman and Ed Sheehan), Island Heritage, Norfolk Island.
- 1973: Holy Man: Father Damien of Molokai, Harper, New York.
- 1980: A Dream of Islands, Norton, New York.
- 1981: Angels of War: The People of Papua New Guinea and World War II (with Andrew Pike and Hank Nelson), Ronin Films. Canberra.
- 1982: Night of the Dolphins, Deakin University, Australia.
- 1984: Holy Man: Father Damien of Molokai
- 1985: Land and Power in Hawaii (with George Cooper), Benchmark Books, Honolulu.
- 1988: Hawaii: The Islands of Life, Nature Conservancy, Honolulu.
- 1989: Hawaii 1959-1989, Publishers Group Hawaii, Honolulu.
- 1994: Prisoners of The Japanese: POWs of World War II in the Pacific, William Morrow, New York.
- 1998: Follow The Music (with Jac Holzman), FirstMedia, Santa Monica.
- 2000: Archipelago:The Islands of Indonesia (with Marty Fujita), University of California, Berkeley.
- 2002: Bite The Hand: A Play, El Leon, Berkeley.
- 2006: Honolulu: The First Century, Mutual Publishing, Honolulu.
- 2008: Honolulu Stories: Voices of the Town Through the Years (with Bennett Hymer), Mutual Pubiishing, Honolulu.
- 2009: Wayfinding Through the Storm: Speaking Truth to Power at Kamehameha Schools 1993-1999 (with Na Leo o Kamehameha), Watermark, Honolulu.
- 2014: The Boy From Boort: Remembering Hank Nelson (with Bill Gammage and Brij Lal), Australian National University Press, Canberra.

== See also ==
- List of famous people from Hawaii
